= Tarzanesque =

Term used to describe Tarzan-like characters

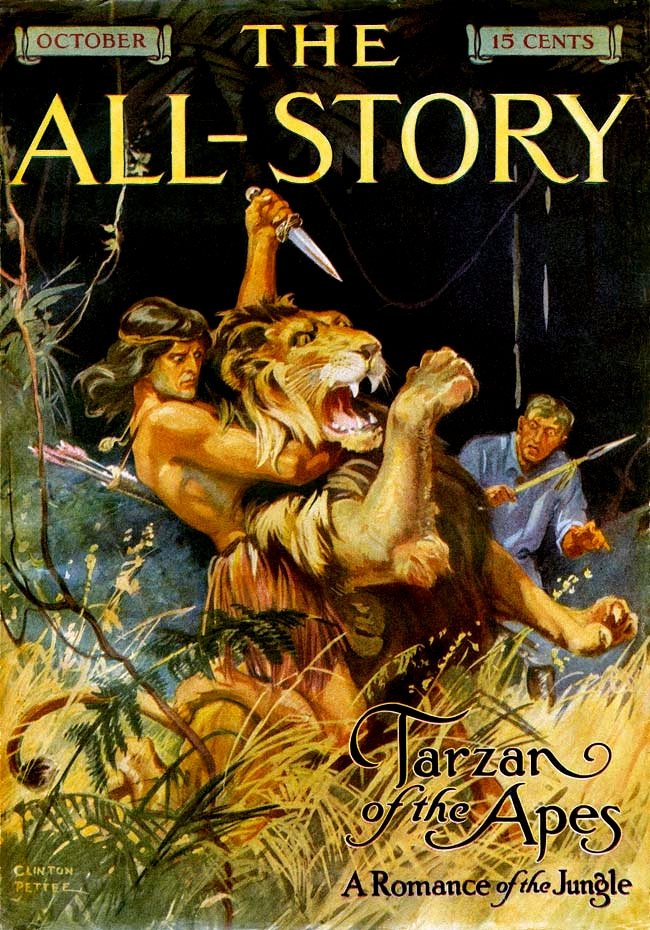
Cover of The All Story (October 1912), Tarzan's literary debut

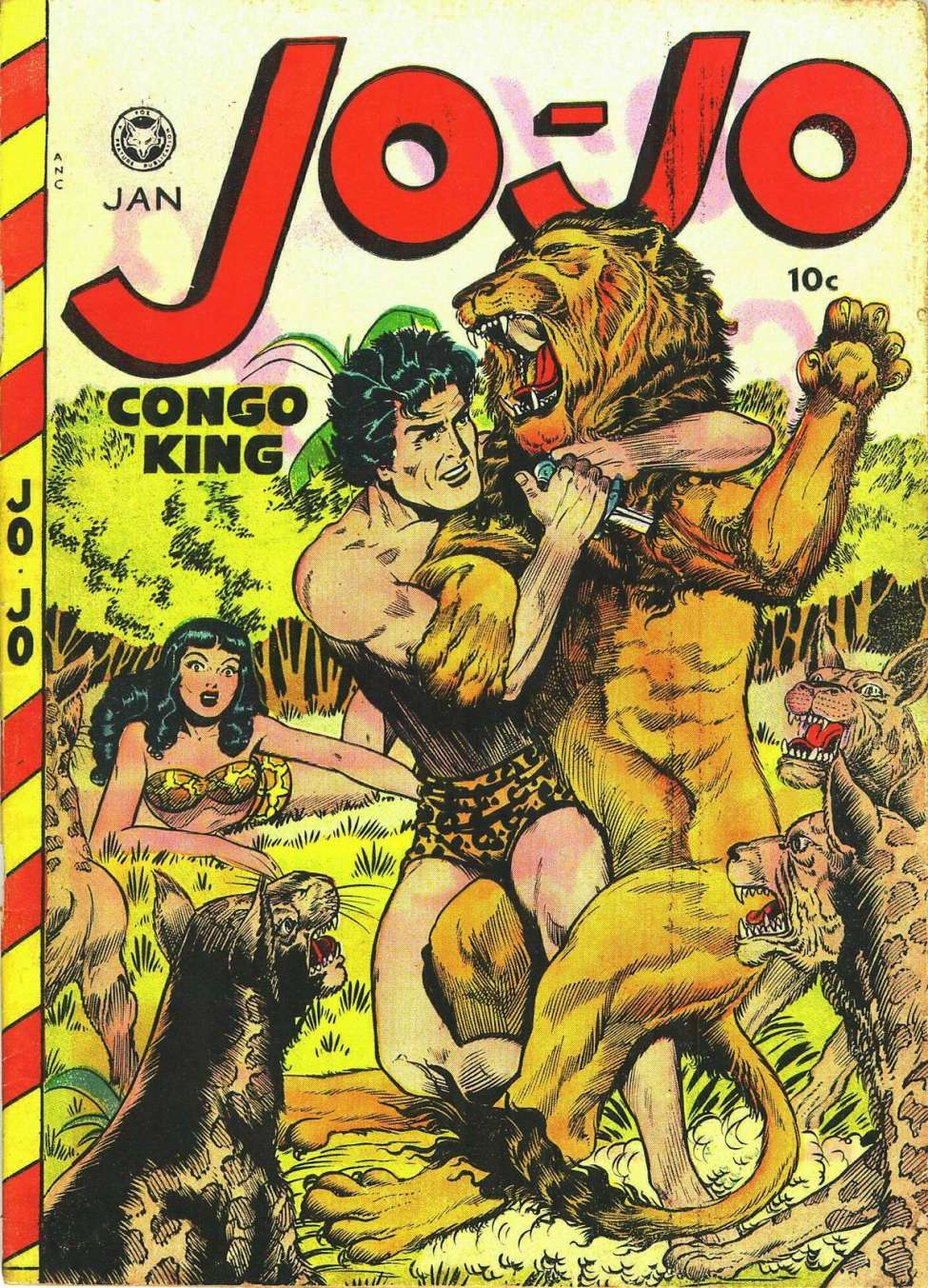
Cover of Jo-Jo, Congo King #23 (1949)

Tarzanesque (in French: Tarzanide) is a term created by Frenchman Francis Lacassin used to describe characters in comic books inspired by Tarzan. A tarzanesque character resembles Tarzan in his physical resourcefulness, within a line of action that includes an adventurous life in the jungle, the gift of understanding and being understood by animals, contact with lost civilizations and courage combined with the ability to deal with nature. The creation of such characters may have been propitiated by the success that Tarzan had achieved since his appearance in literature in 1912, culminating with the release of daily comic strips in 1929, which paved the way for a genre that combined the allure of the unknown environment, the need for the archetypal characteristics of the hero and the popularity of access.

The Tarzanesque follows the same line of action as Tarzan, but including diversified heroes, female or male, adapted to adventures set in a set of elements that make up the jungle stereotype in the popular imagination, which includes, besides the African jungles, the Amazon jungle and even strange jungles in polar regions.

== Etymology and characteristics ==
The term "Tarzanide" was created by French literary critic Francis Lacassin, author of three books on the Man-Ape: "Tarzan: mythe triomphant, mythe humilié" (1963), "Tarzan" ou "le Chevalier crispé" (1971) and "La Legendé de Tarzan" (2000). Like Tarzan, a Tarzanide is generally considered "the king of the forest" or "the king of the jungle." He can talk to animals and even lead them and is respected by most of the neighboring tribes and often finds lost civilizations. The spelling "Tarzanidi" is also applicable, as is the Portuguese variant "Tarzânico".

While the terms "Tarzanide" and "Tarzanidi" are adopted for characters originating in Franco-Belgian and Italian comic book publications, for North American publications the term Tarzanesque is widely used. According to Wiktionary, the word Tarzanesque suggests a savage jungle life.

== History ==
=== First manifestations ===
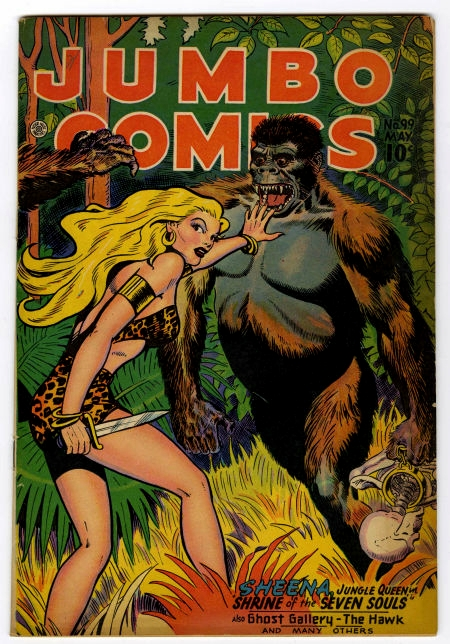
Although Sheena (pictured above) was not the first "jungle girl," she brought in her look - a leopard-skin bikini - a novel feature that would be widely replicated.

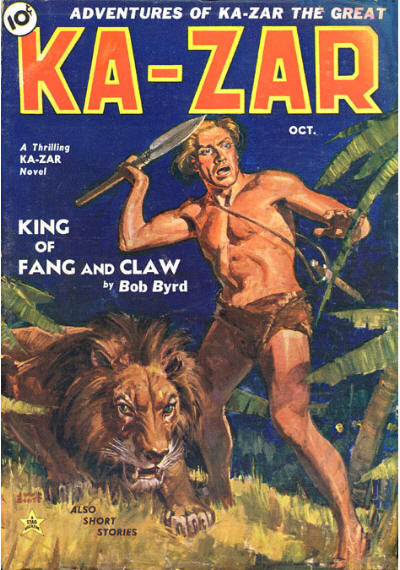
Cover of the October 1936 issue of Ka-Zar.

The success of the Tarzan comic strips that appeared in 1928 boosted the creation of multiple "kings" and "jungle girls" (also called "jungle women"). Some of these manifestations were independent - in 1931, writer Jerry Siegel, who would eventually become one of the creators of Superman but at the time was still in high school, created a Tarzan parody for Glenville High School's student newspaper The Torch - while others were crafted for professional purposes. In 1933, Filipinos Francisco Reyes (cartoonist) and Pedrito Reyes (comic book writer), created one of the first Tarzan copies, Kulafu. In 1934, Alex Raymond created the comic strips Flash Gordon and Jungle Jim to compete, respectively, with Buck Rogers and Tarzan. Jim, however, was not a "King of the Jungle", but a hunter who had adventures in Asian jungles. At the beginning of the series, there was the character Zobi, the jungle boy.

In 1936, Timely Comics (now Marvel Comics) published the first issue of the pulp magazine "Ka-Zar", starring the title character, a young man named David Rand who had been raised in the Belgian Congo alongside the lion Zar. In addition, William L. Chester released the character Kioga from the book series, who lives his adventures in the Bering Strait, and in 1938, Kioga was given the series Hawk of the Wilderness, played by Herman Brix, who had also played Tarzan in the film serial The New Adventures of Tarzan released in 1935. In the fifth issue of New Comics (June 1936), Homer Fleming's character Sandor was introduced, who had adventures in Northeast India.

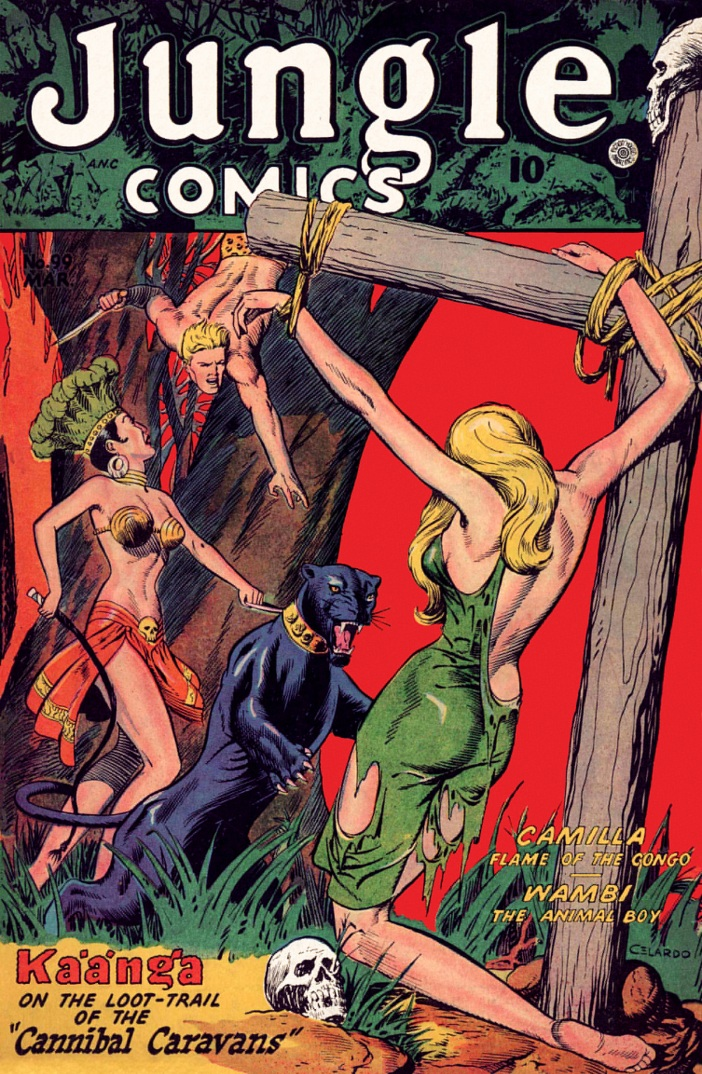
Kaanga on the cover of John Celardo's Jungle Comics #99, Fiction House, March 1948

In 1937, Will Eisner and Jerry Iger created Sheena, Queen of the Jungle, one of the best known "jungle girls". Although well known, the character was not the first to fit this archetype: in 1904 "Rima the Jungle Girl" had appeared as a character from the book Green Mansions: A Romance of the Tropical Forest, written by W. H. Hudson - eight years before Tarzan.

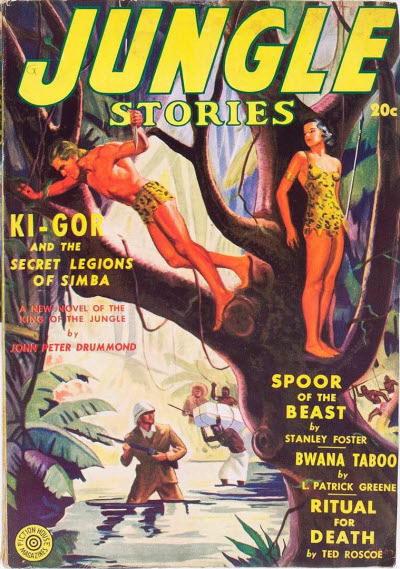
Ki-Gor in Jungle Stories from Fiction House, 1939

Sheena was the first "jungle girl" to wear a leopard-skin bikini, which would soon become a cliché, and was also the first heroine to get her own comic book, published by Fiction House between 1942 and 1953. Rima would only have her first comic book version in 1952, in issue #90 of Classics Illustrated, drawn by Alex Blum, and a regular series in 1974, by DC Comics, and even appeared in three episodes of the cartoon Super Friends.

In 1939, Ka-Zar makes his comic book debut in Marvel Comics #1, the publisher's first publication of its kind and the first written by Ben Thompson. It was adapted from Bob Byrd's short story "King of Fang and Claw", initially published in the hero's pulp magazine. Besides the Belgian Congo, Ka-Zar would live adventures in Somaliland (a region of Somalia), Ethiopia, Kenya, England and the United States and face the most varied villains: hunters, smugglers, fascists, Nazis, among others. In 1941, the hero participated in a story by the android Human Torch. Ka-Zar was published by the company until 1942.

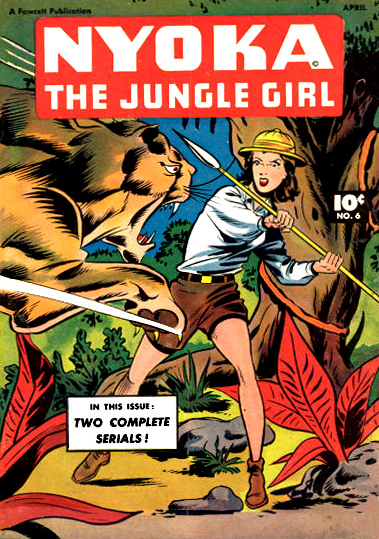
Cover of Nyoka the Jungle Girl No. 6, April 1947, Fawcett Comics, character created for a Republic Pictures serial in 1941.

In 1940, Fiction House started publishing the stories of "Kaanga, Jungle King" and Sheena, Queen of the Jungle Besides Kaanga and Sheena, Fiction House had already published, in the pulp magazine Jungle Stories, the character "Ki-Gor". Also published by Fiction House were "Camilla, Queen of the Lost Empire", created by C. A. Winter and "Tabu, the Jungle Wizard", created by Fletcher Hanks.

In 1941, Republic Pictures released the film serial Jungle Girl, about young Nyoka Meredith (Frances Gifford), raised in Africa by her father. The studio used a title from a novel by Edgar Rice Burroughs, however, the story and character were created by the studio. The following year it released a new sitcom, Perils of Nyoka, this time, Nyoka had her last name changed to Gordon and was played Kay Aldridge. In the same year, she got comic books published by Fawcett Comics and in 1944, Linda Stirling stars in another studio serial, The Tiger Woman, this time set in South America.

The Haitian Andre LeBlanc creates the Brazilian jungle girl Morena Flor, published in daily comic strips and in the comic book of Capitão Atlas, a kind of Brazilian hunter similar to Jungle Jim created for a radio show. LeBlanc was Sy Barry's assistant on another jungle hero: The Phantom, created by Lee Falk.

In 1949, actor Steve Reeves starred in the pilot episode of the TV series Kimbar of the Jungle, however, the project was not approved.

In the 1950s, two artists who drew Tarzanesque heroes from Fiction House would work on Tarzan comic strips: John Celardo (who illustrated stories starring Kaanga) and Bob Lubbers (who illustrated stories featuring Camilla).

=== Black Tarzanesques ===
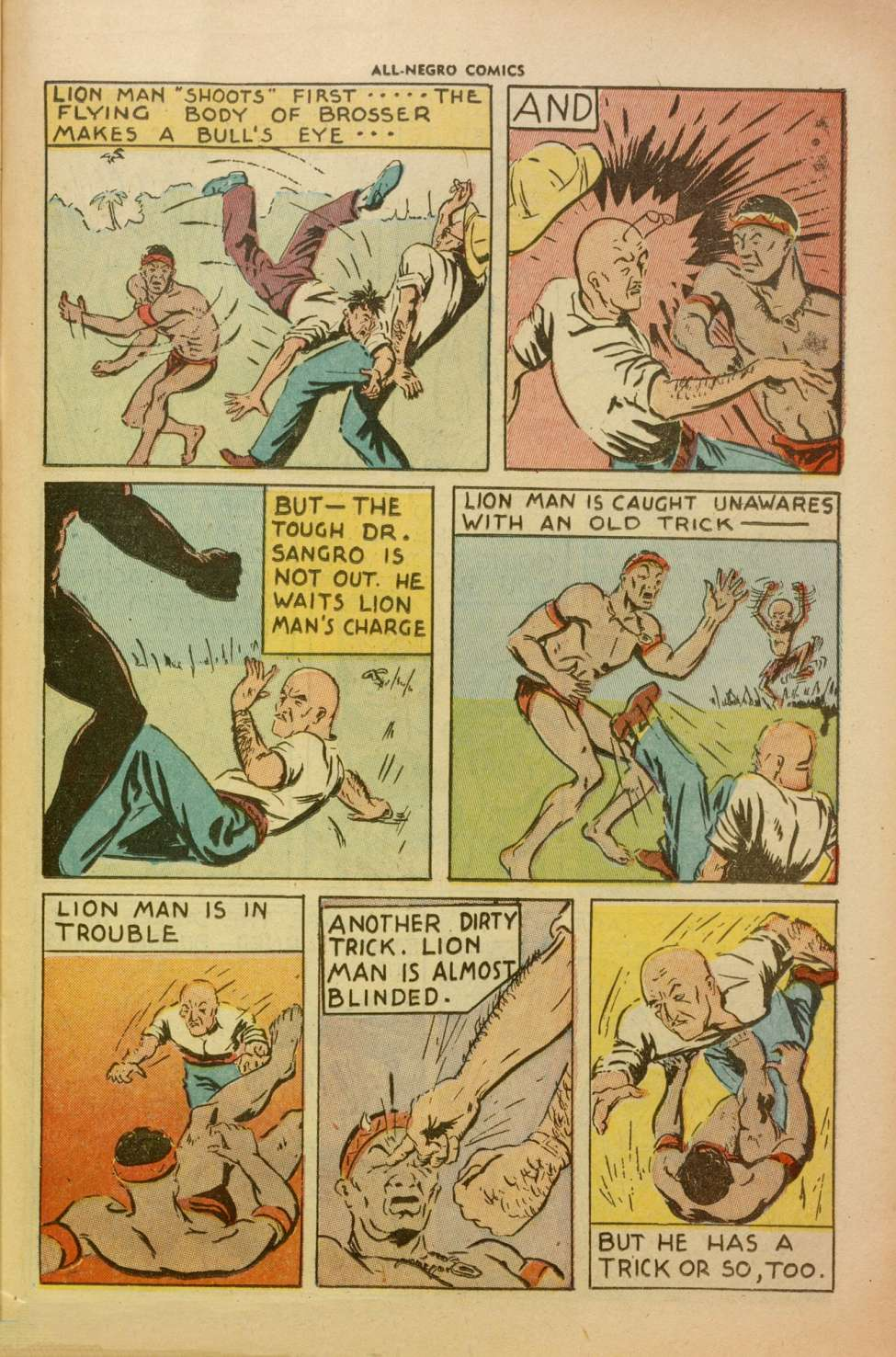
"Lion Man" page from All-Negro Comics #1 (1947).

In 1947, disturbed by the way black people were portrayed in comic books (especially in hero stories set in Africa), the African-American journalist Orrin C. Evans created the comic book All-Negro Comics, produced and directed to the black audience (something like the so-called race films (Note: The word race was used in a pejorative sense; in the 1950s, the terms race music and race records were replaced by rhythm and blues or R&B. in Black Pau: A soul music no Brasil nos anos 1970) between the 1910s and 1950s and the Blaxploitation movies in the 1970s). In this comic book Orrin's brother, George J. Evans Jr., created the hero Lion Man, an African-American scientist in the service of the UN, which when sent to the Gold Coast in Africa, comes across a uranium mine and, fearing that the mine fell into the wrong hands, he decides to protect it and becomes a kind of black Tarzanesque. Despite the efforts, the comic book lasted only one issue. This was not the first attempt at a black Tarzanesque; the also African-American Matt Baker created Voodah in 1945, for the third issue of Golfing/McCombs Publisher's Crown Comics. On the cover of the fifth issue, Voodah appears as a Caucasian (although he was still black on the inside pages), and in the next issue, Voodah became white on the inside pages as well.

=== Indian Tarzanesques ===
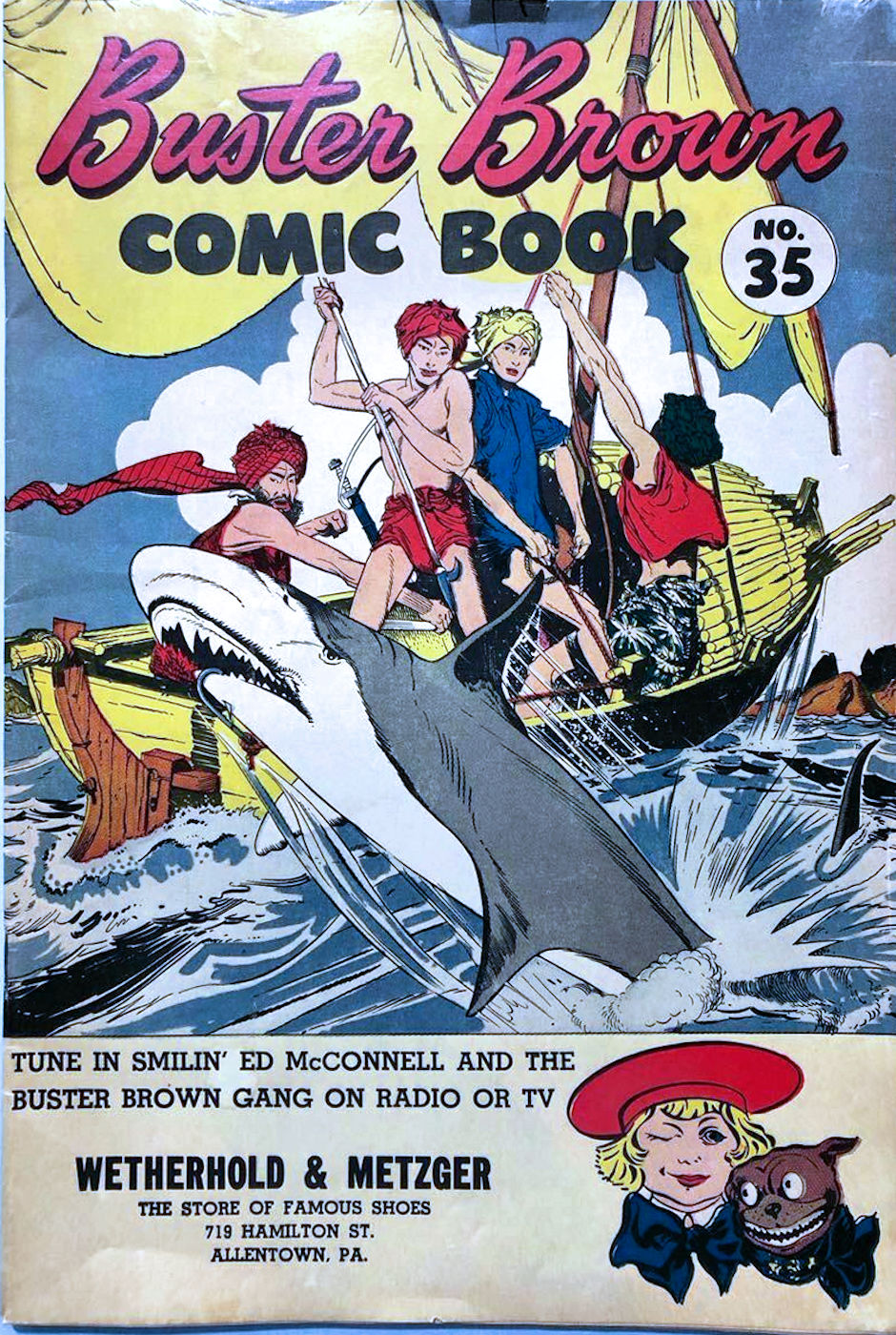
Ghanga/Gunga in Buster Brown Comic Book #5 (July, 1954)

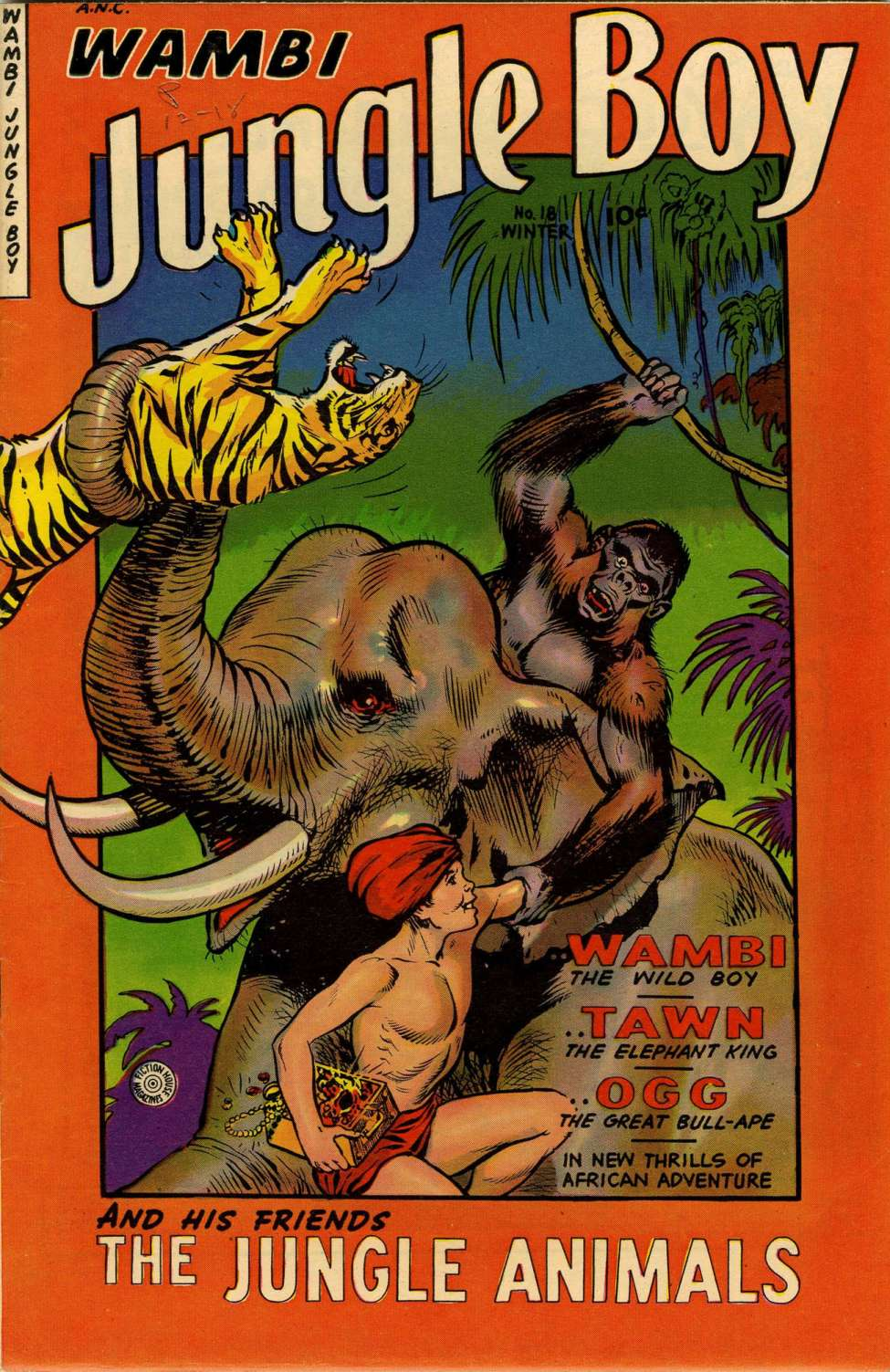
Wambi Jungle Boy #18 (1952)

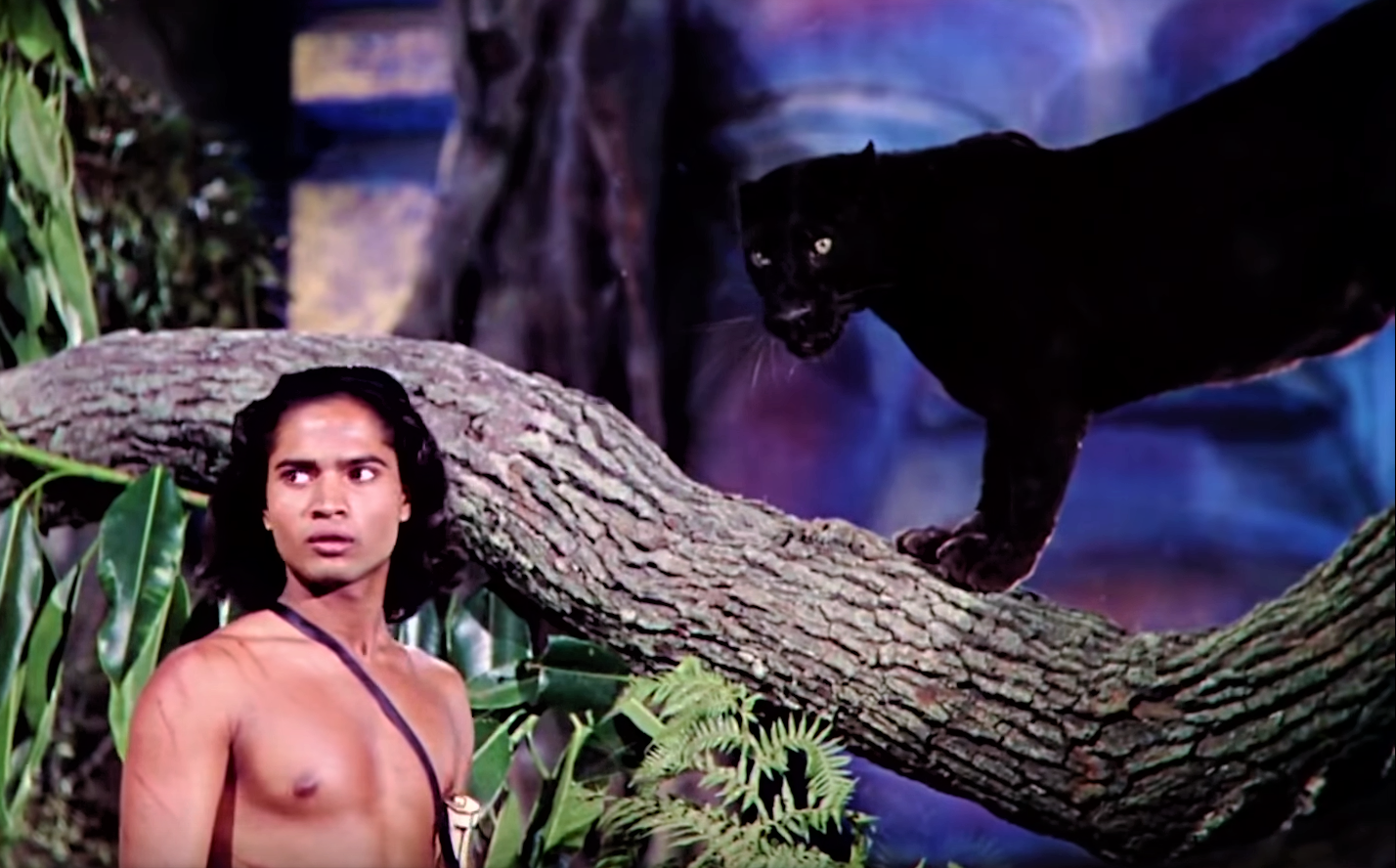
Bagheera and Mowgli in Jungle Book

Fiction House released a few characters of Indian origin like Wambi the Jungle Boy, released in Jungle Comics #1 in January 1940). Co-created by Henry Kiefer, Wambi lived in a jungle that mixed elements of African and Indian jungles, and in addition to Jungle Comics, Wambi was published in his own comic book . As female examples, there is Taj of the Elephants, an anonymously created character released in Jungle Comics #57 (1944) and Jan of the Jungle, co-created by Enrico Bagnoli and released in Rangers Comics #42 (August 1948). In Buster Brown Comics #11 (1948), the character Ghanga was released, later spelled Gunga. In addition, the Indian-American actor Sabu Dastagir played two characters created by Rudyard Kipling: Toomai in Elephant Boy (1937) and Mowgli in Jungle Book (1942), as well as becoming a comic book character inspired by these roles: Sabu, Elephant Boy, published in Red Circle Comics #4 (April 1945) and a two-issue comic book of his own with stories illustrated by Wally Wood and published by Fox Feature Syndicate. In 1946, in the pages of the French comic book Fillette, the heroine Durga Râni appeared, written by René Thévenin and illustrated by René Pellos.

=== In the 1950s ===
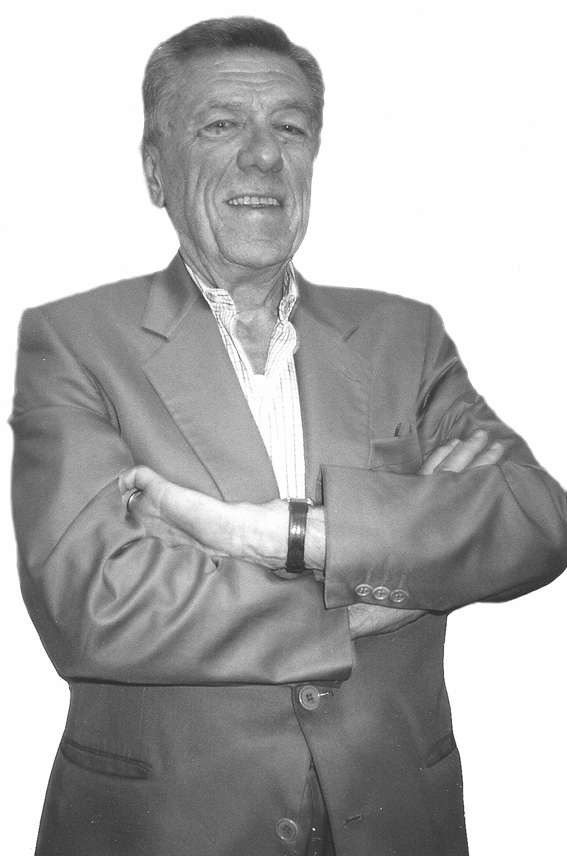
Roberto Renzi, co-creator of Akim

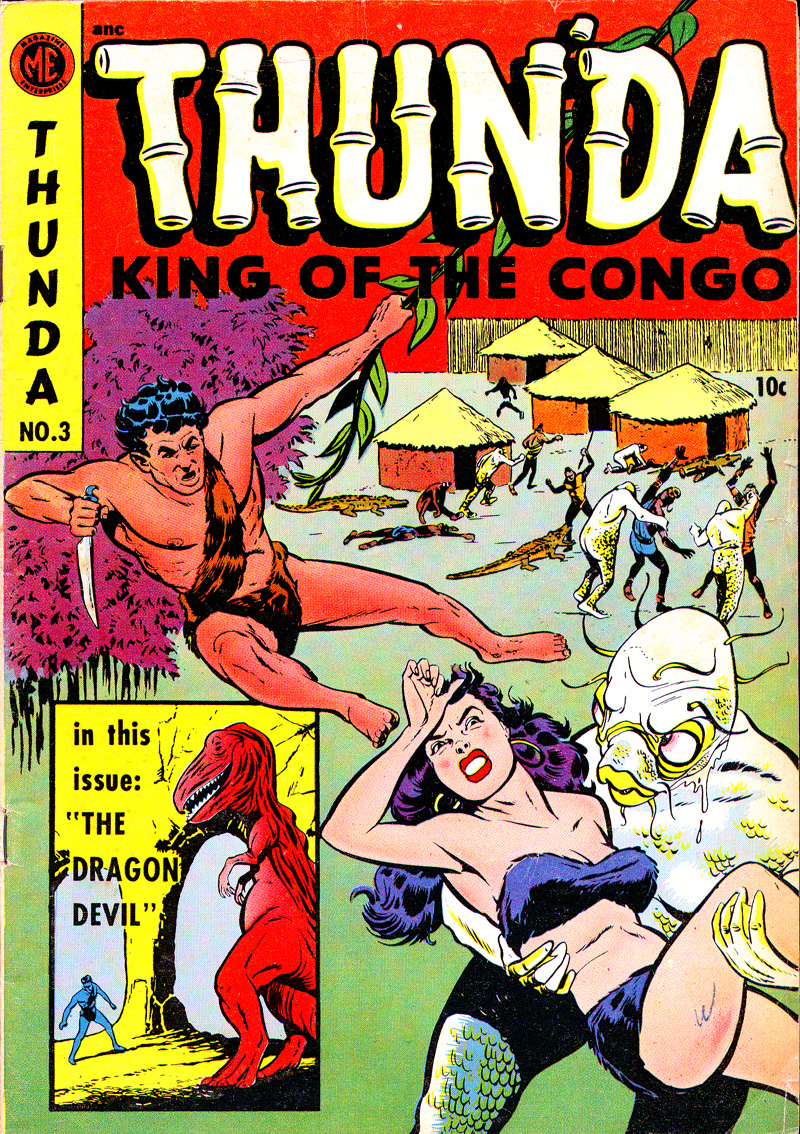
Cover of Thun'da, King of the Congo #3 (1952) - Art by Bob Powell

In 1950, Akim appeared in the Italian wallet-sized format comic book Albo Gioello created by the comic book writer Roberto Renzi and the cartoonist Augusto Pedrazza. The character, who was published until 1991, didn't live adventures only in the jungles, but also fought common criminals in the so-called "civilized world", and for this he even wore common clothes used in big metropolises.

In 1952, Frank Frazetta created Thun'da, King of Congo for Magazine Enterprises, which even had a series in the same year called King of the Congo starring Buster Crabbe (actor who had already played Tarzan in the 1933 series Tarzan the Fearless). Thun'da (whose real name is Robert Drum) is an American Air Force aviator who gets lost in the Congo and who, in the comics, faced dinosaurs and prehistoric beings, (Note: Elements that also existed in Tarzan stories, specifically in the lost world of Pal-ul-don and in Pellucidar, another book series created by Edgar Rice Burroughs, creator of Tarzan in Allen A. Debus (2009). Prehistoric monsters: the real and imagined creatures of the past that we love to fear McFarland [S.l.] p. 275. ISBN 9780786442812) but due to budget cuts, these elements were not present in the series. In the 1960s, Frazetta illustrated covers of paperback versions of Tarzan's stories published by Ace Books.

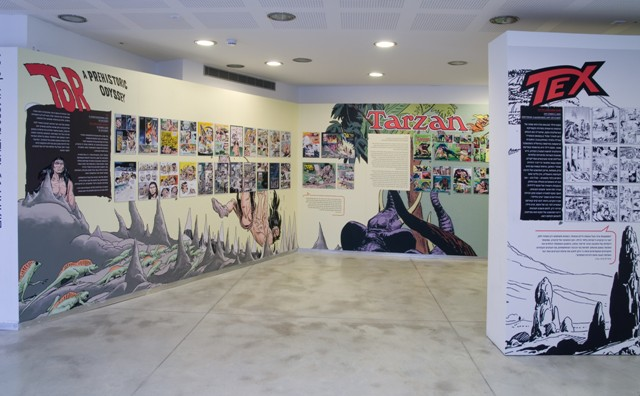
Joe Kubert's Tor on display.

In 1953, Joe Kubert released Tor, which differed from Tarzan by setting its stories in prehistoric times (more precisely in the year 1 million BC, corresponding to the Quaternary Period, which is considered by paleontologists to be the time when the first humans appeared; despite this, the author used poetic license and included dinosaurs in Tor's stories). Years later Kubert would also draw the Tarzan comics. In the same year Atlas Comics (the name used by Marvel during the 1950s) launched Lorna the Jungle Queen, a comic book starring a blonde jungle girl. Between 1954 and 1955, it published two comic book s that had the jungles as a setting: Jungle Action and Jungle Tales. Jungle Action published two characters typically inspired by Tarzan: Lo-Zar (the character had his name changed to Tharn and had his hair color changed from blond to red in republished in the 1970s so as not to be confused with Ka-Zar) and Jungle Boy. The jungle girl, Jann of the Jungle also appeared in Jungle Action #1, and from issue 8 on, the comic book was renamed Jann of the Jungle, (Note: Common practice in American comic books) in Nano Souza (19 de maio de 2009). A Complicada numeração das revistas americanas. HQManiacs) lasting for 9 more issues. In another comic book, Jungle Tales #1, was published the story Waku, Prince of the Bantu, a new attempt of a black hero set in the African jungles, created by unknown authors. The story featured an African prince whose character anticipated some of the concepts that would be present in Black Panther (another Marvel character, created by Stan Lee and Jack Kirby in Fantastic Four #52, July 1966). In 1972, already as Marvel Comics, the publishing house launched a new comic book called Jungle Action, whose first four issues featured reruns of Tharn, Jann and Lorna's stories published in the original comic book . The fifth issue, published in 1973, featured stories by the Black Panther. Also in 1955, Republic Pictures released the TV series Panther Girl of the Kongo, which resembled Jungle Girl, and even used scenes from Jungle Girl's archives. In Japan the film Brooba is released, clearly inspired by the films starring Johnny Weissmuller.

=== In the 1960s ===
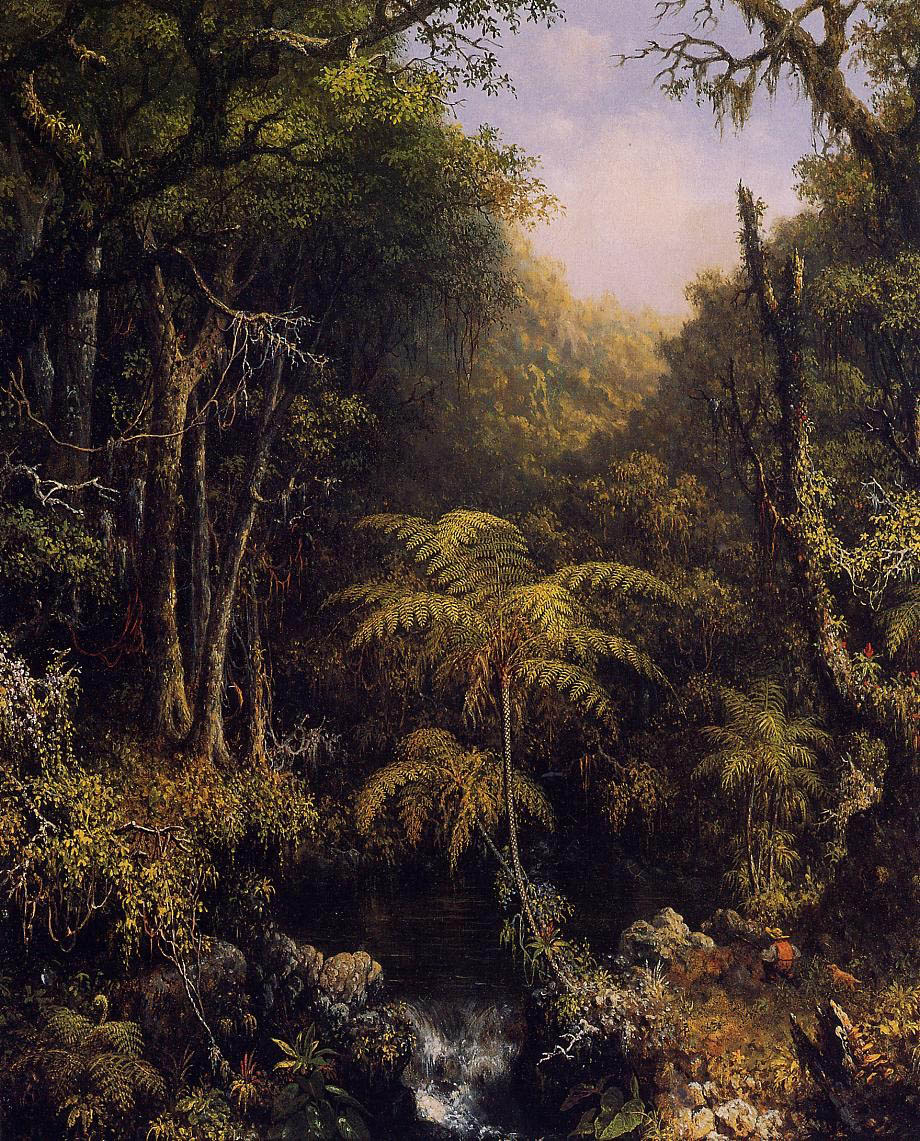
Brazilian jungles also served as settings for the adventures of the Tarzanesque.

In 1962, Brazilian actor Wilson Vianna starred in two films of the Mexican tarzanesque Barú: Barú, el hombre de la selva and El mundo salvaje de Barú. On Brazilian TV, Vianna played Capitão Atlas.

In the mid 60's, taking advantage of the success of the genre, other Brazilian publishers created their own tarzanesques. One of them was Targo (later renamed Taika) from Editora Outubro created by Heli Otávio de Moura Lacerda. Targo was an orphan who survived a plane crash in the Amazon rainforest (more precisely in the border of the state of Amazonas with Peru, although he also had stories set in the Brazilian Plateau) and was raised by indigenous peoples. The character had stories produced by artists such as Helena Fonseca, Jayme Cortez, Gedeone Malagola, Nico Rosso, Rodolfo Zalla, Moacir Rodrigues Soares, and like Tarzan and Thun'da, Targo also lived with prehistoric creatures considered extinct. The idea of an Amazon inhabited by prehistoric beings had already been portrayed in the book The Lost World by Arthur Conan Doyle, published in 1912. Like Tarzan, Targo also had his own family, consisting of his wife Arimá, her brother Aurici, and a jaguar. Under Jayme Cortez's guidance, the character was a joint creation of editors and cartoonists from Editora Outubro, and it was up to Gedeone Malagola to name the hero. According to him, the name came from a policeman friend who had the surname "Targa" and he used to joke with the name of his friend comparing it to the Tarzan. Coincidentally, Targa was also the name used in a French tarzanesque published in the 1940s. Gedeone himself had also created another Tarzan-inspired character, "Tambu" and made Tor stories by Joe Kubert for Gráfica Novo Mundo. Another example was Tarun by Paulo Fukue, released in EDREL's Magia Verde comic book . Like Thun'da, Tarun was a man trying to return to civilization, not fitting in the wild child/good savage archetypes, and like Targo, Tarun lived adventures in a lost region of the Amazon, the "Fantastic Region". For the Mexican origin publisher Editormex, the comics artist Edmundo Rodrigues drew a story of Antar (an anagram of Tarzan), which was a magazine of photo comics of Tarzan movies, Jungle Jim, among others.

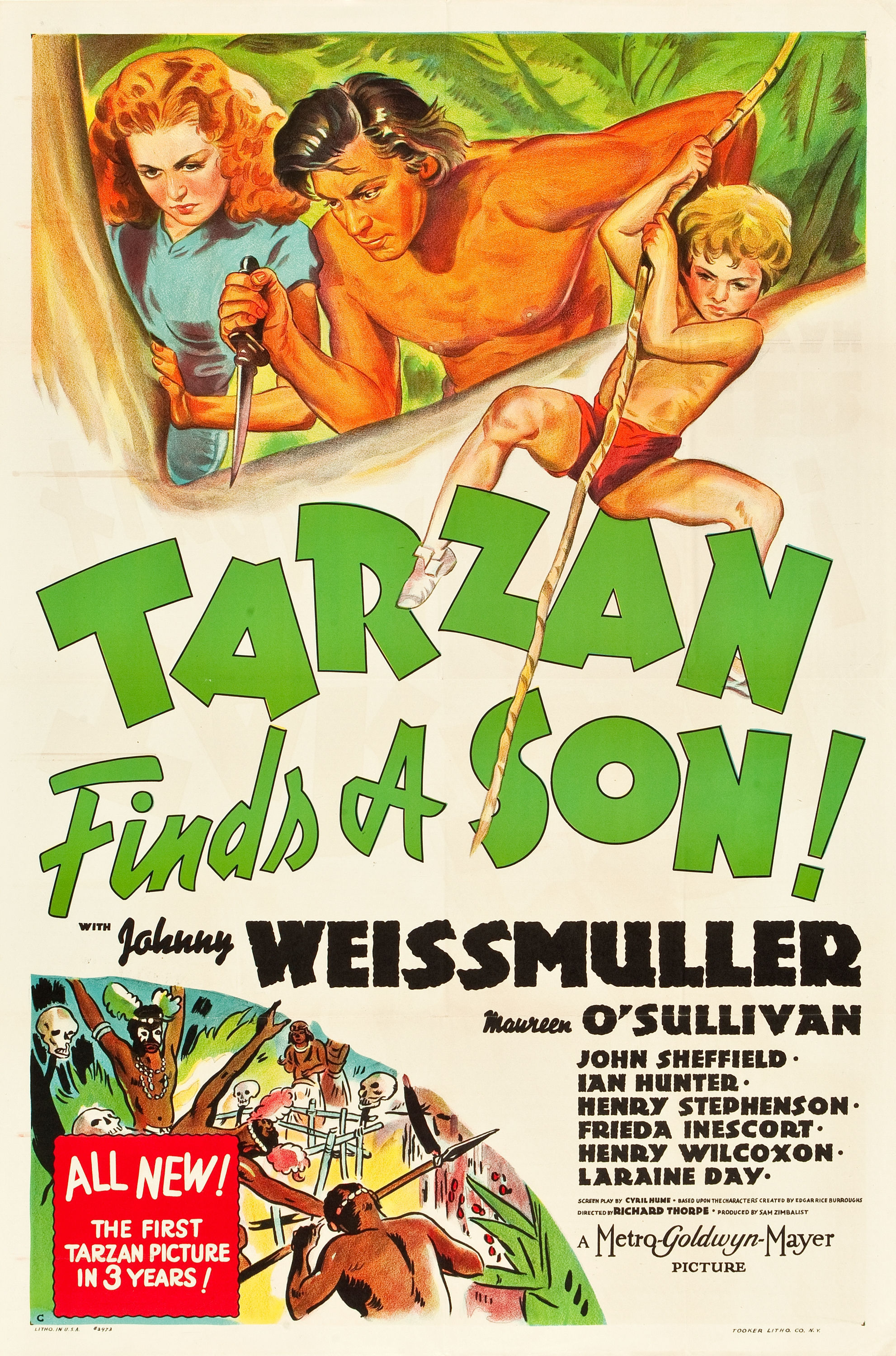
Poster for the 1939 film Tarzan Finds a Son.

In 1963, created by Marcel Navarro to compete with Akim, the French character Zembla appeared in the comic book Spécial Kiwi, which even had stories drawn by Akim's co-creator Augusto Pedraza. However, Zembla's stories were closer to parodies, since he was raised by lions and wore a leopard skin strip, and had as allies a lion, a wildcat, a kangaroo, a pygmy, and a magician (clearly inspired by Lee Falk's Mandrake). The character was published until 1994 in France, and both Akim and Zembla were published in digest size. Another French creation was Yataca, born in the Amazon Jungle, living his adventures in the Americas for twenty issues, and after that, inexplicably, his stories moved to Africa.

Between 1967 and 1968, DC Comics published Bomba, the Jungle Boy whose main character had appeared in a series of books beginning in 1926 and ending in 1938. Like Tarzan, Bomba was also adapted for the movies between 1949 and 1955, with his stories set in the jungles of South America. The character was played by Johnny Sheffield who had played Boy, Tarzan and Jane's adopted son in the 1939 film Tarzan Finds a Son!. In the series of Bomba films, Boy replaced Korak, Tarzan's legitimate son in the book series, and South America was swapped for Africa, with scenes reused from the 1930 documentary Africa Speaks! His stories would be republished by the publisher in the 1970s in comic book s starring Tarzan and produced by Joe Kubert. To avoid copyright infringement, Bomba was renamed Simba.

== Ka-Zar and Shanna ==
Location of the Savage Land from the Marvel comics.

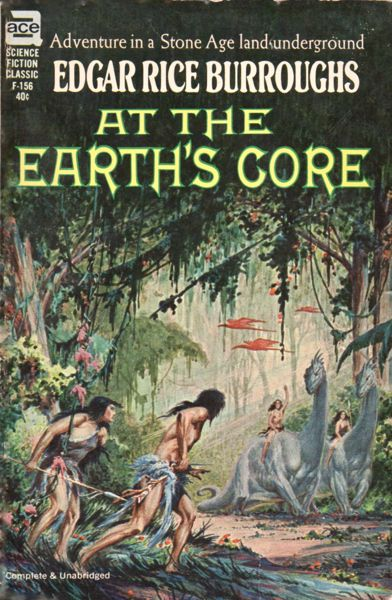
Cavemen and dinosaurs in the lost world of Pellucidar, cover of the book At The Earth's Core by Edgar Rice Burroughs, 1962, art by Roy Krenkel.

A new version of Ka-Zar was made in 1965 by Stan Lee and Jack Kirby, inspired by Tarzan and Tor by Joe Kubert. The new Ka-Zar appears as a secondary character in the Uncanny X-Men comic book, where the Belgian Congo was swapped for the fictional Savage Land (a tropical zone curiously located in the Antarctic Circle, also inhabited by apparently extinct prehistoric beings, very similar to Pellucidar, the hollow earth created by Burroughs), the lion Zar for the saber-toothed cat Zabu, and David Rand for Kevin Plunder. Ka-Zar was the most successful tarzanesque; he had several comic book s of his own, mini-series and graphic novels. In 1973, Marvel Comics released another jungle girl, Shanna, with her own comic book that only lasted five issues, but continued to have stories published in Ka-Zar's (whom she eventually married), Daredevil's and Hulk's comic books.

== Tarzanesques today ==
In 2000, TV Globo launched the telenovela Uga-Uga by Carlos Lombardi, where the actor Claudio Heinrich played a young man raised by indigenous peoples who looked like Tarzan.

Several of the Tarzanesques created for the North American market are in the public domain in this country. This is due to the fact that with the implementation of the Comics Code Authority in the mid 1950s, several publishers were closed down and did not renew the rights to their characters, as did the heirs of Edgar Rice Burroughs and companies such as The Walt Disney Company.

Tarzan also entered the public domain in 2001, but before that some authors were already using him in stories. From the mid-1990s to the early 2000s, the character participated in official crossovers published with Batman, Superman, and Predator. In 1999, comic book writer Warren Ellis and cartoonist John Cassaday created several pulp-inspired characters for the Planetary series. Kevin Sack, the Lord Blackstock (an allusion to the title Lord Greystone, which Tarzan inherited from his father) is clearly inspired by Tarzan, and in 2000, Alan Moore used a version of Tarzan in his The League of Extraordinary Gentlemen, without, however, having his name revealed in the series.

In 2005, Shanna had a miniseries produced by comic book artist Frank Cho, who also created his own jungle girl named Jana released in the Jungle Girl miniseries published by Dynamite Entertainment (known for publishing numerous projects with characters in the public domain). In 2006, Marvel Comics recognized the original Ka-Zar as an integral part of the Marvel Universe in the sixth issue of All-New Official Handbook of the Marvel Universe A to Z, the publisher's official guide. However, the character did not appear in any new stories (as did the original Human Torch, for example).

In 2007, Sheena, Queen of the Jungle had a five-issue miniseries published by Devil's Due Digital, scripted by Steven E. de Souza (a screenwriter best known for the screenplay of the Bruce Willis film Die Hard), drawings by Matt Merhoff, and covers designed by Joe Jusko, Nicola Scott, Khary Randolph, and Tim Seeley. In early 2010, Devil's Due Digital began distributing digitized Sheena material.

In 2008, comic book writer Alex Mir and illustrator Alex Genaro released the Valkíria, that shows the title character in a post-apocalyptic Brazil where prehistoric creatures have returned to live on Earth.

In 2011, Dynamite Entertainment launched Lord of the Jungle comic book, and although it is in the public domain, the name Tarzan cannot be used in the titles without permission. Later, the publisher announced that it would publish a new series of Thun'da, and in the first issue, the publisher chose to republish the origin of the character drawn by the creator Frank Frazetta along with the new stories produced by Robert Place Napton (scripts), with Cliff Richards (drawings) and cover by Jae Lee (cover). In 2015, Dynamite announced a Tarzan and Sheena crossover, released in 2016 under the title Lords of the Jungle. The company also announced a new Sheena series for 2017 by comic book writers Marguerite Bennett and Christina Trujillo and comic artist Moritat, set on Amazon instead of Africa.

In July 2023, Antarctic Press announced the publication of Valkíria in their version of Jungle Comics.

== See also ==
- Noble savage
- Feral child
- Prehistoric fiction
- George of the Jungle
- Caveman
- The Jungle Book
- Lost world
- The Phantom
- Pulp magazine

== Bibliography ==
- GOIDA, A; KLEINERT, André (2011). Enciclopédia dos Quadrinhos. L&PM Editores. ISBN 9788525424518.
