= Jungle girl =

Female stock character

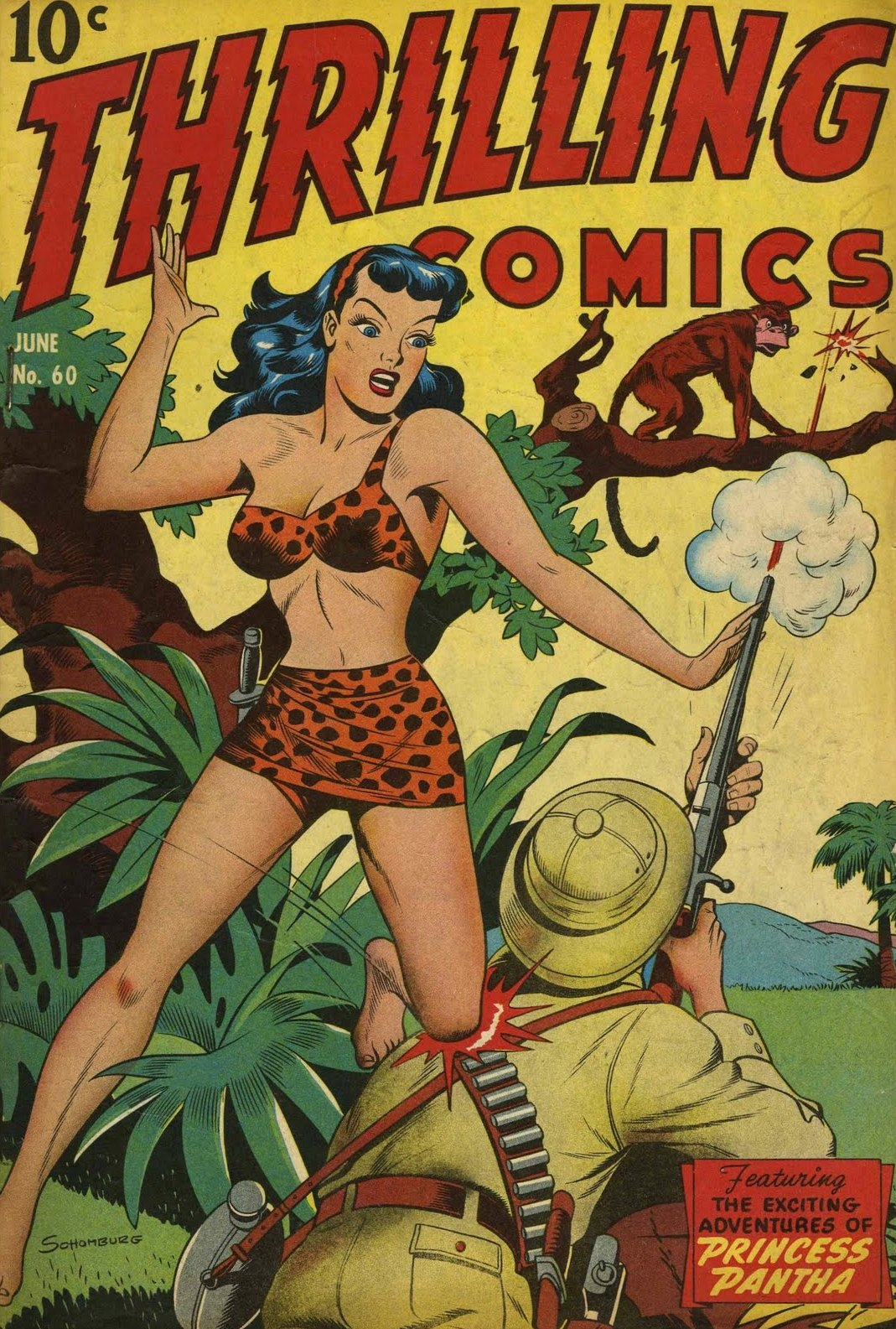
Princess Pantha is an example of a jungle girl

A jungle girl (so-called, but usually adult woman) is an archetype or stock character, often used in popular fiction, of a female adventurer, superhero or even damsel in distress living in a jungle or rainforest setting. A prehistoric depiction is a cave girl.

== Description ==
Jungle girls are generally depicted as wearing either a scanty animal print (usually leopard) bikini or some type of jungle dress made from fur, leather, or sometimes vegetation. Most are barefoot while some are shown in primitive shoes. Some are feral children; some come from a wealthy, educated family who grew up in the jungle. Others come to visit, whether by accident or design, and decide to stay and serve as protectors of the land and local tribes. They are the female counterpart of Tarzanesque characters. They are depicted either as a tough heroine, perhaps a jungle queen, or as a bound and gagged damsel in distress to be rescued by a jungle man. They are almost all white, and never native to the jungle where they have their adventures.

== History ==
A prototypical version of the jungle girl was the ancient but eternally youthful sorceress Ayesha in H. Rider Haggard's She: A History of Adventure (1886). The first forest-dwelling character in fiction was Rima from W. H. Hudson's 1904 novel Green Mansions. One popular character, adapted into various media, is Sheena, Queen of the Jungle, who, though created by American writer-artists Will Eisner and Jerry Iger, made her debut in the British magazine Wags #46 (1937). Sheena went on to star in the American comic book anthology series Jumbo Comics the following year.

== List of jungle girl characters ==
=== Literature ===
- Rima (from W. H. Hudson's 1904 novel Green Mansions)
- Meriem (from Edgar Rice Burroughs' 1917 novel The Son of Tarzan)
- Fou-tan (from Edgar Rice Burroughs' 1932 novel Jungle Girl)
- Balza (from Edgar Rice Burroughs' 1933 novel Tarzan and the Lion Man)

=== Comics ===
- Akili (Gimm's Fairy Tales' Jungle Book)
- Ann Mason (Fiction House's Jungle Comics) and later Kaänga, Jungle Lord (1949–1954) — the mate of Ka'a'nga, Jungle King; who, like Sheena, wears a leopard skin dress
- Camilla, Wild Girl of the Congo (Fiction House's Jungle Comics, 1940s)
- Cave Girl, Magazine Enterprises' Africa, Thun'da, and Cave Girl (1950s)
- Cavewoman Meriem Cooper (Basement Comics, 1993–2006)
- Dhalua Strong and, in a more satirical manner, her daughter Tesla (America's Best Comics)
- Fana The Jungle Girl (Incarna Comics, 1989)
- Fantomah, Mystery Woman of the Jungle (Fiction House's Jungle Comics, 1940s)
- Gwenna from the webcomic Kaza's Mate Gwenna, where both Kaza and her are a parody of Ka-zar and Shanna from Marvel Comics and are usually shown as nude
- Irish of the Jungle (1990s comic book based on Irish McCalla, TV's "Sheena")
- Jann of the Jungle (Marvel Comics, 1950s)
- Jano, companion to Voodah (Crown Comics, 1947), later revived by AC Comics
- Jessie (Fiction House's Jungle Comics, 1940s) — the mate of Ka'a'nga, Jungle King
- Judy of the Jungle (Better/Nedor Comics' Exciting Comics, 1940s)
- Jun-Gal (1940s comic)
- Jungle Girl, a.k.a. Jana Sky-Born (2007) (Dynamite Entertainment comic)
- Jungle Lil (1950s comic)
- Jungle Queen/Julie Winters (comic/TV series The Maxx)
- Kara, Jungle Princess (Exciting Comics #44, Feb 1946)
- Kazanda (1940s comic)
- Kyra (1985-1988 comic) by robin ator
- Kyrra - Alien Jungle Girl (2013 comic)
- Leopard Girl (Atlas Comics' Jungle Action, 1950s comic)
- Lorna, the Jungle Queen/Lorna, the Jungle Girl (comic book, Atlas Comics, 1953)
- Makyou No Shanana (2009 Japanese manga)
- Marga the Panther Woman (1940s comic)
- Mowgli (Grimm's Fairy Tales' Jungle Book)
- Nyoka (Fawcett's Jungle Girl/Nyoka the Jungle Girl and Master Comics), and the main character in the 1941 movie serial Jungle Girl and its 1942 sequel Perils of Nyoka
- Nula is another jungle girl also from the webcomic "Kaza's Mate Gwenna" who considers herself to be a predecessor to Gwenna and decides to be a nudist like the latter after an adventure that involves the both of them.
- Pamela of the Jungle (Italian comic, 2007)
- Pantera Bionda (Italian comic, 1948–1950)
- Princess Pantha (Better/Nedor Comics' Thrilling Comics, 1940s)
- Princess Taj (Fiction House's Jungle Comics, 1940s) — rides an elephant
- Princess Vishnu (Fiction House's Fight Comics, 1940s)
- Prymal: The Jungle Warrior (Maelstrom Comics, 2014–Present)
- Ranee, Princess of the Jungle (1950s comic)
- Rarotonga, (Mexican comic series by Lágrimas, Risas y Amor)
- Rima the Jungle Girl, featured in 1970s DC Comics publications
- Rulah, Jungle Goddess (Fox Comics' Zoot Comics and Rulah, Jungle Goddess)
- Saari, the Jungle Goddess (1950s comic)
- Safari Cary (1940s comic)
- Shanna the She-Devil (Marvel Comics, created 1972)
- Sheena, Queen of the Jungle (comic book, launched in 1937)
- Shirl, The Jungle Girl (1950s parody comic)
- Taanda of White Princess of the Jungle (comic by Avon Periodicals, 1951–1952)
- Tanee (formerly Gwenna) in 1940s comic Jo-Jo, Congo King
- Tangi (1940s comic)
- Tara Fremont (AC Comics' Femforce)
- Taranga (1950s comic)
- Tiger Girl (Fiction House Fight Comics, another Tiger Girl from Kaanga, Jungle Lord (1940s–50s), and Tiger Girl (Gold Key Comics, 1960s)
- Tygra of the Flame People (Better/Nedor's Startling Comics, 1940s; no relation to the ThunderCats character)
- Vanya: The Lost Warrior (2021-present)
- Vooda, Jungle Princess, originally El'nee (Ajax-Farrell comic) #20–22 (1955)
- Wana from Zago, Jungle Prince (Fox Comics, 1948–1949)
- Zara of the Jungle (1940s comic)
- Zegra, Jungle Empress (originally Tegra) (Fox Comics, 1940s)

=== Live-action film and television ===
- Algona, played by Deborah "Deek" Sills in Trader Hornee (1970), an adult sex comedy film
- Aloa from the German film Golden Goddess of Rio Beni (1964) played by Gillian Hills
- Anatta, played by Laurette Luez in The Bowery Boys comedy film Jungle Gents (1954)
- Cavegirl (UK/South African TV series, 2002–2003)
- Christa, portrayed by Shannon Day, from the 1990s Land of the Lost TV series
- Diana from Diamonds of Kilimandjaro (1983) a French film starring Katja Bienert as the half-civilized jungle girl Diana who was raised in Africa by her stepfather and the cannibal tribe that found them following an airplane crash
- Doreen Stockwell, played by Julie London in Nabonga (1944)
- Eba from the 1985 comedy Cavegirl played by Cynthia Thompson
- Eva from Kong Island, a 1968 Italian exploitation film
- Eva from King of the Gorillas, a 1977 Mexican film
- Eve, a.k.a. The Face of Eve (1968), British film starring Celeste Yarnall as Eve
- Girl, played by Vitina Marcus in The Man from U.N.C.L.E. episode "The My Friend the Gorilla Affair" (1966). She is a Tarzan parody.
- Gungala from Gungala, the Virgin of the Jungle (1967) and Gungala, the Black Panther Girl (1968), Italian sexploitation films starring Kitty Swan as the titular character.
- Inara, the Jungle Girl (2012), a film about a girl (played by Cali Danger) who was descended from a tribe of Amazons living on the island of N'iah
- Inyaah, Jungle Goddess (1934) film.
- Jane Porter from Tarzan (numerous novels and films)
- Jean Evans (Panther Girl of the Kongo, 1955), Republic serial update of Jungle Girl
- Jelita, played by Lydia Kandou in the Indonesian film Jungle Virgin Force, a.k.a. Perawan Rimba (1983)
- Jennifer of the Jungle (The Electric Company television program)
- "The Jungle Goddess", played by Rochelle Hudson in the film The Savage Girl (1932)
- Kilma/Laura von Marnix from Kilma, Queen of the Jungle (1975), Spanish film
- Kuhlaya, played by Ann Corio in the film Jungle Siren (1942)
- Lana, Queen of the Amazons (1964), German film with Catherine Schell as Lana
- Veronica Layton, played by Jennifer O'Dell, in Sir Arthur Conan Doyle's The Lost World (TV series, 1999–2002)
- Leda, played by Valerie Leon in the British film Carry On Up the Jungle (1970)
- Leela, companion of the 4th Doctor on the Doctor Who TV series, played by Louise Jameson (1977–1978)
- Liane from Liane, Jungle Goddess (1956, German film)
- Lothel, played by Ruth Roman in the film serial Jungle Queen (1945)
- Luana the Jungle Girl a.k.a. Luana, the Girl Tarzan (1968), Italian-German film with Mei Chen as Luana
- Luana/Susan Wilson from Daughter of the Jungle (1982), Italian film with Sabrina Siani as Luana/Susan Wilson
- Lureen, played by Cleo Moore from the Congo Bill serial (1948)
- Maya from Power Rangers Lost Galaxy (1999), a tribesgirl from the planet Mirinoi who is portrayed by Cerina Vincent
- Meelah, played by Gale Sherwood in the film Blonde Savage (1947)
- Rima, played by Audrey Hepburn in the 1959 film Green Mansions
- Miss Robin Crusoe (1954 movie, played by Amanda Blake)
- Samantha, played by Evelyn Kraft, from The Mighty Peking Man (1977), a Hong Kong-made version of King Kong
- Sarima (an original character on YouTube played by YouTuber Brianna Zeigler aka Bridazzel)
- Shandra the Jungle Girl (1999), straight-to-video film
- Sheela, a.k.a. Africadalli Sheela (1986), Indian variation of the Sheena film
- Sheena, Queen of the Jungle (1955–56) television series starring Irish McCalla
- Sheena (film) (1984) film adaptation starring Tanya Roberts
- Sheena (TV series), (2000–2002) TV series starring Gena Lee Nolin
- Tarzana, the Wild Girl (1969), Italian sexploitation film with Femi Benussi as Tarzana/Elizabeth
- Tarzeena, Queen of Kong Island (2008), erotic parody film by Fred Olen Ray
- Ticoora, played by Lois Hall, in Daughter of the Jungle (1949).
- The Tiger Woman (1944), Republic Pictures serial starring Linda Sterling
- Nina Trent, the White Goddess played by Edwina Booth in the film Trader Horn (1931)
- Ulah, played by Dorothy Lamour in the film The Jungle Princess (1936)
- Greta Vanderhorn, played by Wanda McKay in the film Jungle Goddess (1948)

=== Animation ===
- Ainbo from a computer-animated film Ainbo: Spirit of the Amazon, she is part of a tribe in the Amazon
- Do-A-Lot from Working with Words/Journey Through the Jungle of Words, a Golden Step-Ahead Video
- Jana of the Jungle, a Hanna-Barbera series in 1978
- June from Tarzoon: Shame of the Jungle, an animated French/Belgian film with an X rating
- Jungle Janet of the Civic Minded Five from The Tick, 1990s animated series based on the comic
- Lua, voiced by Saffron Henderson, from Kong: The Animated Series (2000–2001) she is a shaman from Kong Island
- Magnolia from George of the Jungle (2007 TV series), she is the daughter of a witch doctor
- Princess Rosella in the animated film Barbie as the Island Princess (2007)
- Shaka from the web animation Chainmail Bikini Squad by MondoMedia (2012)
- Sticks the Badger from Sonic Boom from the Sonic the Hedgehog franchise
- Ursula from George of the Jungle, 1967 cartoon series by Jay Ward
- Willa and Nyda from ThunderCats (1985–1989), they are members of the Warrior Maidens
- San from the Studio Ghibli film Princess Mononoke

=== Video games ===
- Ayla, a cavewoman from Japanese video game Chrono Trigger (released 1995)
- Jill of the Jungle, a computer game released in 1992
- Vixen, a computer game released in 1988

=== Sports ===
- Jungle Grrrl (Erica Porter), wrestler persona created in 2000 for Women of Wrestling

=== Music ===
- Katy Perry dressed up as a jungle girl in the music video of her 2014 single "Roar."
- Backup dancers in the music video of the 1987 song Walk the Dinosaur by Was (Not Was)

== See also ==
- Amazons
- Cambodian jungle girl
- Feral child
