= Jungle Girl =

Jungle girl is an archetype or stock character of a female adventurer or superhero or even a damsel in distress living in a jungle or rainforest setting.

Jungle Girl may also refer to:

- Ro Cham Phoeung labeled by the media as a Jungle Girl was found after purportedly being missing for 19 years in a Cambodian jungle
- Bindi the Jungle Girl, a 2007 Discovery Channel television show featuring Bindi Irwin
- Jungle Girl (novel), a 1932 Edgar Rice Burroughs novel
  - Jungle Girl (serial), a 1941 movie serial based on the novel
- Jungle Girl (Dynamite Entertainment), comic character from Dynamite Entertainment

== See also ==
- Cave Girl (disambiguation)
- Sabine Kuegler, writer of Jungle Child, about her experiences in West Papua (New Guinea island) and Europe
