= Cave Girl =

Cave girl or Cavegirl may refer to

- Cave Girl (comics), a 1950s comic-book character
- The Cave Girl, a 1913 novel by Edgar Rice Burroughs
- The Cave Girl (film), a 1921 film
- Cavegirl, a 2002 British TV series
- Cavegirl (film), a 1985 sex comedy film
- Cave Girl, a 2008 album by The Texreys fronted by Brendan Kibble
- Cave-Girl, a 2013 book of poetry by Mary Elizabeth Parker
- Cavegirls, nickname of the female athletic teams of Carlsbad High School (Carlsbad, New Mexico)
- Cave Girls, a 1984 American underground film

== See also ==
- Caveman, a stock character representative of Paleolithic primitive humans
- Cavewoman (comics), a comic-book character created in the 1990s
- Jungle Girl (disambiguation)
