= The Phantom of 42nd Street =

1945 film by Albert Herman

- DVD cover
- Directed by: Albert Herman
- Written by: Jack Harvey (novel); Milton Raison (novel and screenplay)
- Produced by: Albert Herman; Martin Mooney
- Starring: Dave O'Brien; Kay Aldridge; Alan Mowbray
- Cinematography: James S. Brown Jr.
- Edited by: Hugh Winn
- Music by: Karl Hajos; Walter Greene
- Production company: Producers Releasing Corporation
- Distributed by: Producers Releasing Corporation
- Release date: May 2, 1945
- Running time: 58 minutes
- Country: United States
- Language: English

The Phantom of 42nd Street is a 1945 American mystery film directed by Albert Herman and starring Dave O'Brien, Kay Aldridge and Alan Mowbray. It was produced by the low-budget Poverty Row studio Producers Releasing Corporation. The film's sets were designed by the art director Paul Palmentola.

== Plot ==
An actor is killed during the performance of a play while critic Tony Woolrich (Dave O'Brien) is attending. Initially Woolrich is reluctant to investigate, even though he's encouraged to do so by his friend Romeo (Frank Jenks), who is also the taxi driver who brought him to the show, and acts as a sort of sidekick throughout the story.

Tony is chewed out by his editor for not investigating when he happened to be at the scene of the crime, and so he takes an initially reluctant interest. Tony becomes more involved in the investigation when there is another murder, and when Claudia Moore (Kay Aldridge, in her last movie role), the girl he loves, is suspected, and is also possibly threatened by the killer.

== Cast ==
- Dave O'Brien as Tony Woolrich
- Kay Aldridge as Claudia Moore
- Alan Mowbray as Cecil Moore
- Frank Jenks as Egbert "Romeo" Egelhofer, taxi driver
- Edythe Elliott as Jane Buchanan
- Jack Mulhall as Lt. Walsh
- Vera Marshe as Ginger
- Stanley Price as Reggie Thomas/The Phantom
- John Crawford as John Carraby
- Cyril Delevanti as Roberts
- Paul Power as Timothy Wells
- Budd Buster as Mike, stage doorman
- Pat Gleason as Reporter
- Milton Kibbee as Peters, newspaper editor
- Harry Strang as Policeman
- Robert Strange as Soothsayer in Play

== Bibliography ==
- Fetrow, Alan G. Feature Films, 1940-1949: a United States Filmography. McFarland, 1994.
