= Green Mansions (film) =

- Theatrical release lobby card by Joseph Smith
- Directed by: Mel Ferrer
- Screenplay by: Dorothy Kingsley
- Based on: Green Mansions; 1904 novel by William Henry Hudson
- Produced by: Edmund Grainger
- Starring: Audrey Hepburn; Anthony Perkins
- Cinematography: Joseph Ruttenberg
- Edited by: Ferris Webster
- Music by: Heitor Villa-Lobos; Bronislau Kaper
- Color process: Metrocolor
- Production company: Metro-Goldwyn-Mayer
- Distributed by: Metro-Goldwyn-Mayer
- Release date: March 19, 1959
- Running time: 104 minutes
- Country: United States
- Language: English
- Budget: $3,288,000
- Box office: $2,390,000

Green Mansions is a 1959 American adventure-romance film directed by Mel Ferrer. It is based upon the 1904 novel Green Mansions by William Henry Hudson. The film starred Audrey Hepburn (who at the time was married to Ferrer) as Rima, a jungle girl who falls in love with a Venezuelan traveller played by Anthony Perkins. Also appearing in the film were Lee J. Cobb, Sessue Hayakawa and Henry Silva. The score was by Heitor Villa-Lobos and Bronislau Kaper.

The film was intended to be the first of several projects directed by Ferrer and starring his wife, but ultimately this was the only one released. It was one of the few critical and box office failures of Hepburn's career. Vincente Minnelli had been slated to direct the film, but delays in the project led Metro-Goldwyn-Mayer to choose Ferrer to direct.

== Plot ==
A young man named Abel narrowly escapes Caracas, Venezuela, after it is overtaken by rebels. He decides to seek revenge, as his father, the former minister of war, was killed. After getting supplies, he takes a canoe to the far shore, where he is nearly killed by a jaguar, but he is saved by the native people.

He decides to prove his bravery by not moving once he sees the chief, Runi, and telling his story. Runi’s son Kua-ko, who has lived with the missionaries of Caracas and speaks English, tells Abel that Runi has agreed that so long as he does not harm them, they will not harm him. Abel agrees and befriends Kua-ko, who tells him of the "Bird Woman", who killed his older brother, and that their tribe is not allowed in the nearby forest.

Abel ignores the warning and ventures into the forest, where he sees a young woman who quickly disappears. He returns to the natives, and Kua-ko tells him that Runi wishes Abel to use his gun and kill the girl. Abel returns to the forest but decides to warn the girl. He sees her again, but he is bitten in the leg by a coral snake. The girl takes Abel to her home and tends his wound. Upon waking, he meets the girl's grandfather, Nuflo, who tells him her name is Rima.

The next day, Abel meets Rima again, and they talk. Rima takes a liking to Abel, but Nuflo warns her that he will leave once his leg heals. Abel soon is able to walk without a cane, and Rima begins showing him the forest. Abel tells her that he has come to like her as well, and Rima is confused. She goes to speak with her dead mother's spirit and decides to return to where she came from to ask a village elder about her strange new feelings for Abel. Later, Abel and Rima travel to the edge of the forest, where he shows her Riolama, which she remembers as her village. Despite Nuflo's reluctance to take her, Rima forces him to show her the way by threatening his soul if he does not.

Abel decides to return to the natives. He tells Runi of how Rima saved him, but neither he nor Kua-ko believe him. He quickly realizes that Kua-ko killed his brother and placed the blame on Rima. After a bravery test, Kua-ko and the other natives make ready to enter the forest and kill Rima.

Abel escapes and warns Nuflo and Rima, and they escape to Riolama, where Nuflo tells Abel that he cannot return to the village because he caused a massacre. He helped Rima and her mother, and he promised to take care of Rima, but he was ashamed at his part in the massacre. Rima overhears and curses Nuflo. She then rushes to Riolama, where she faints in the heat. Abel follows and takes her to safety. When she awakens, Abel tells her how he has come to love her, and Rima does also, having recently come to decipher her strange feelings as love for him.

Rima steals away while Abel is asleep to go back to Nuflo and apologize, but when she finds him, the natives have burnt their home and he is nearly dead. She asks his forgiveness, and with his last words, Nuflo tries to warn her of the natives. She races through the forest to escape. Kua-ko burns the great tree where she has hidden. Meanwhile, Abel awakens and realizes what Rima has done. He quickly follows and finds Kua-ko, who teases that he killed her. The two fight in a stream, where Abel drowns Kua-ko.

Abel remembers a flower Rima told him of, which, if it disappears in one place, blossoms in another. He finds the flower, and not far off, he sees Rima, who extends her hand.

== Cast ==
- Audrey Hepburn as Rima
- Anthony Perkins as Abel
- Lee J. Cobb as Nuflo
- Sessue Hayakawa as Runi
- Henry Silva as Kua-Ko
- Nehemiah Persoff as Don Panta
- Michael Pate as Priest
- Estelle Hemsley as Cla Cla

== Production notes ==
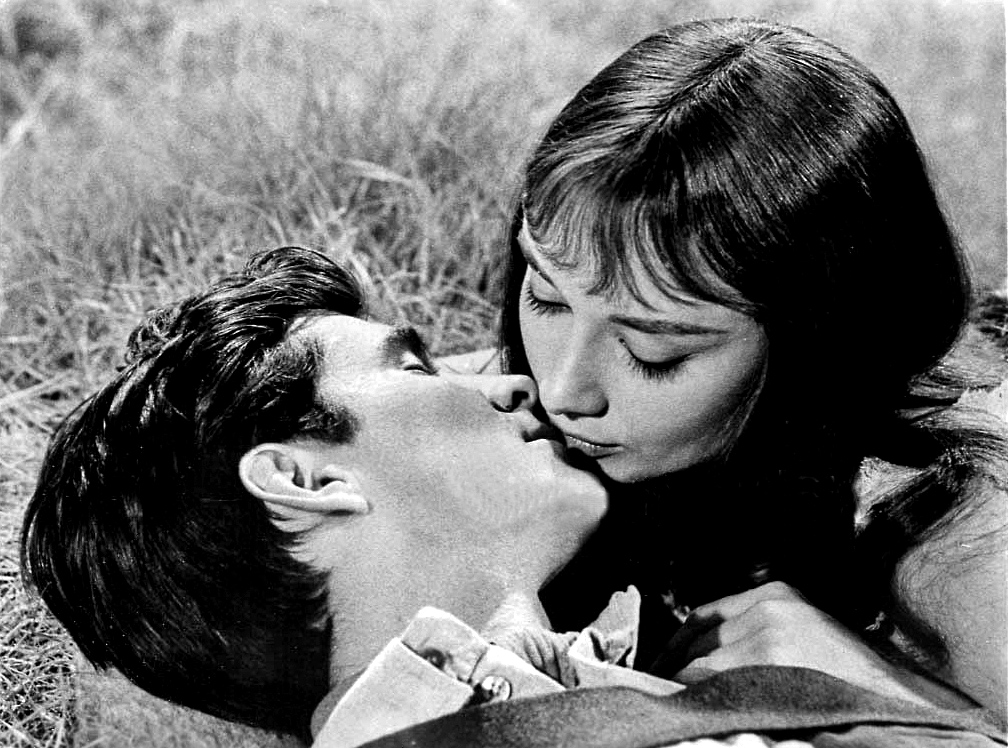
Original studio publicity photo of Anthony Perkins and Audrey Hepburn for Green Mansions

In 1933, after the success of the film Bird of Paradise (1932), RKO Pictures tried to reunite the star couple Dolores del Río and Joel McCrea in Green Mansions. However, the project was canceled. Twenty-five years later, the project was resumed by Edmund Grainger and Mel Ferrer with MGM.

Ferrer traveled to Venezuela to select possible filming locations, but concluded that the jungles there were too dense and dark to allow their use in the action sequences of the film. He did arrange for nearly an hour of jungle footage to be filmed south of Orinoco and in the Parahauri Mountains, much of which was incorporated into the film. The action sequences were filmed on indoor stages and at Lone Pine, California.

Ferrer had several snakes and birds native to the Venezuelan jungle captured and shipped to Hollywood for use in filming. He also brought a baby deer to the residence he shared with Hepburn, and they raised it for several months before filming so that it could be used in several scenes where Rima interacted with the forest creatures.

== Cinematography ==
The film was the first feature film to be photographed using Panavision lenses for 35mm anamorphic widescreen cinematography; however, the process listed on the titles was CinemaScope, the 35mm anamorphic widescreen process developed in the early 1950s by 20th Century-Fox in conjunction with the U.S. optical company Bausch and Lomb. MGM resented having to both rent the special lenses and pay a royalty to Fox for use of the CinemaScope credit on its films, so it engaged Panavision, a then small Los Angeles-area manufacturer of anamorphic projection lenses for theaters, to develop anamorphic lenses for photographing MGM's widescreen productions. Given the popularity and public awareness of the CinemaScope brand, MGM entered in to an agreement with Fox to continue paying for the use of the CinemaScope title on its productions while actually using the new Panavision lenses and listing a small credit elsewhere in the titles, "Process Lenses by Panavision". Projected in the theater, the processes are identical in terms of the size of the film used and the screen width and height. By the late 1960s, Fox adopted Panavision for use on its 35mm anamorphic widescreen productions and withdrew the CinemaScope lenses from the market as Panavision had become the motion picture industry's standard due to its reputation for superior optical performance.

== Music ==
=== Villa-Lobos ===
The Brazilian composer Heitor Villa-Lobos was commissioned to write the full score for the film. However, his music was inspired by the original novel rather than the film adaptation.

Unhappy with the way his music had been used, Villa Lobos edited his full score into the cantata Forest of the Amazon (Floresta do Amazonas). It premiered in 1959 in New York City with the Symphony of the Air and the soprano Bidu Sayão under the composer's direction. The same artists recorded it in stereophonic sound for United Artists Records, which released it on LP and reel-to-reel tape. The recording had a limited release on CD.

Alfred Heller, a friend and associate of Villa Lobos, made a modern digital recording of the complete uncut cantata (74 minutes) with soprano Renee Fleming, along with the Moscow Radio Symphony Orchestra. He wrote on the Amazon website that Villa-Lobos had completed work on the full cantata in December 1958. The United Artists recording used about 46 minutes of the cantata.

=== Kaper ===
A separate source from that quoted above indicates that the score by Villa-Lobos was composed from a translated script before completion of the editing of the film. Although Villa-Lobos did some work on the edited film, the task of scoring the completed film was done by Bronislau Kaper, with Charles Wolcott as the conductor.

For the final score, Kaper wrote original material and used or adapted material composed by Villa-Lobos. Additional music and arrangements were supplied by Sidney Cutner and Leo Arnaud. The love theme "Song of Green Mansions" was composed by Kaper, with lyrics by Paul Francis Webster. The complete Kaper score was issued on CD in 2005 on Film Score Monthly records.

== Reception ==
=== Box office ===
Despite Hepburn's popularity, the film was a box-office disaster. It earned $1,190,000 in the U.S. and Canada and $1.2 million in other markets, resulting in a loss of $2,430,000.

=== Critical ===
Although considerable effort had been made to produce a faithful and convincing rendering of the book, the film was not reviewed well by critics at the time, and it was not a commercial success.

Critics were not kind to the film, impressed neither by its lush widescreen visuals nor by the equally lush musical score that accompanied them ...

Filmink, discussing George Peppard in Breakfast at Tiffany's, reflected "matching it against Audrey Hepburn isn’t always easy – look at Anthony Perkins in Green Mansions."

== Home media ==
The VHS film had only been available in cropped pan and scan transfers. Warner UK struck a deal with former special interest label Digital Classics to release Green Mansions. The film subsequently received an anamorphic NTSC DVD release in the UK on 6 April 2009.

== See also ==
- List of American films of 1959
