= Rima =

Rima as first glimpsed by Abel (and comic book readers) in the 1951 Classics Illustrated adaptation, published in 1952.

Rima, also known as Rima the Jungle Girl, is the fictional heroine of W. H. Hudson's 1904 novel Green Mansions: A Romance of the Tropical Forest. In it, Rima, a primitive girl of the shrinking rain forest of South America, meets Abel, a political fugitive. A film adaptation of Green Mansions was made in 1959 starring Audrey Hepburn.

In 1974, the character was adapted into the comic book Rima the Jungle Girl, published by DC Comics. Though Rima the Jungle Girl ceased publication in 1975, the comic book version of Rima appeared in several episodes of Hanna-Barbera's popular Saturday morning cartoon series, The All-New Super Friends Hour, between 1977 and 1980.

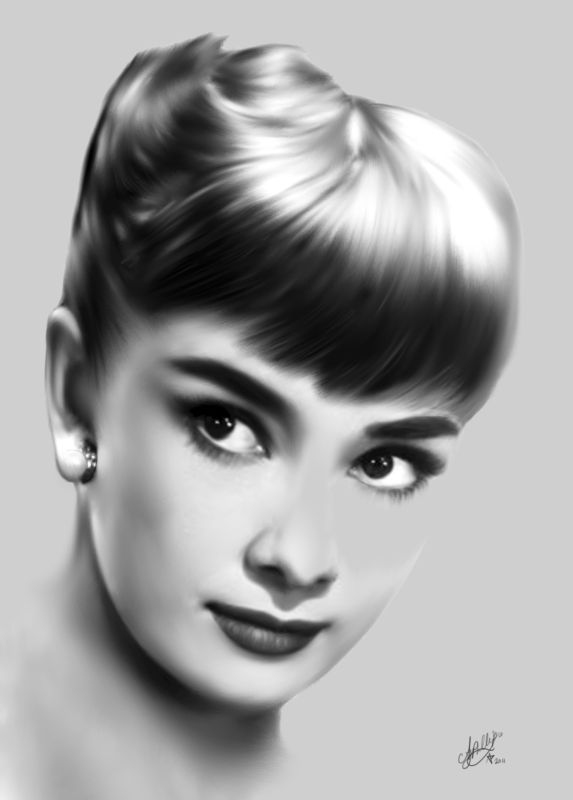
Rima the Jungle Girl was played by Audrey Hepburn in the 1959 film Green Mansions.

== Novel ==
Like her literary cousins Tarzan and Mowgli, Rima sprang from an Edwardian adventure novel; in her case, Green Mansions: A Romance of the Tropical Forest, by W. H. Hudson, published in 1904. Hudson was an Argentine-British naturalist who wrote many classic books about the ecology of South America. Hudson based Rima on a South American legend about a lost tribe of white people who lived in the mountains. The book has a religious tone and Rima's speech is poetic.

It is a romantic adventure set in the South American jungle in which a political fugitive named Abel meets Rima, a girl living in the forest. The girl speaks in a bird-like language. Its theme is the loss of wilderness and the return-to-nature dream, and how unpleasant it would be for a savage to meet modern man (the reverse case is not considered).

== Film ==
Actor and director Mel Ferrer adapted Green Mansions into a 1959 film for MGM Studios, with wife Audrey Hepburn as Rima. The adaptation deviated far from the novel.

== Comic books ==
Rima
- Rima the Jungle Girl #6 (March 1975), art by Nestor Redondo.

Publication information
- Publisher: DC Comics
- First appearance: Historical: 1904; Modern: 1974
- Created by: W. H. Hudson

Rima starred in a seven-issue comic book series, DC Comics' Rima the Jungle Girl (May 1974 – May 1975), adapted by DC writer-editor Robert Kanigher with artwork by penciler-inker Nestor Redondo and covers by Joe Kubert. A variation of the character debuted in a six-issue DC Comics limited series First Wave (May 2010-March 2011), written by Eisner Award–winning writer Brian Azzarello. Rima is here portrayed as a South American native with piercings and tattoos; she does not speak, but instead communicates in bird-like whistles. Although the DC character is a fully grown and powerful woman with ash-blonde hair, the novel's Rima was 17, small (4′ 6″), demure, and dark-haired. Natives avoided her forest, calling her "the Daughter of the Didi" (an evil spirit). Rima's only defense was a reputation for magic earned through the display of strange talents such as talking to birds, befriending animals, and plucking poison darts from the air. Although in the original book Rima was burned alive by Indian savages, in the comics she escaped the fire to have further adventures.

=== Comic book titles ===
These comic book titles feature the Rima character:

==== Classics Illustrated #90: Green Mansions ====
Classics Illustrated published a short adaptation from the novel, with direct quotes. In this adaptation Rima is blonde. It was published by Gilberton Company in December 1951, adapted by George Lipscomb, with cover and interior art by Alex Blum.

==== Rima the Jungle Girl ====
From 1974-1975, Rima starred in a self-titled series which ran for seven issues. This version of the character guest-starred in the DC Comics Saturday morning cartoon The All-New Super Friends Hour.

==== The League of Extraordinary Gentlemen ====
Rima is mentioned, but not seen, in America's Best Comics' The League of Extraordinary Gentlemen vol. 2, #3 (2003), by writer Alan Moore and artists Kevin O'Neill and Ben Dimagmaliw: "...it is near here that the world-famous 'bird girl' Riolama or Rima was discovered..."

== Cartoons ==
Rima the Jungle Girl appeared in three episodes of Hanna-Barbera's The All-New Super Friends Hour during the 1977–78 season, alongside such mainstays as Aquaman, Batman, and Wonder Woman. She first appears in "Fire" (October 1, 1977). Batman, Robin, and Rima the Jungle Girl contend with a spreading forest fire, and have to search for a pair of escaped prisoners who have stolen a forestry truck filled with dynamite. Rima's main contribution is to call upon a nearby bear to push down some trees for an emergency bridge across a wide gap. Her next appearance is in "River of Doom" (November 4, 1977): Wonder Woman and Rima the Jungle Girl search for archaeologists who have accidentally stumbled onto a burial ground of angry natives. The archaeologists are captured and sentenced to death on the River of Doom. The superheroes find the would-be victims by using indigenous animals to scout them out at Rima's command. They later rescue the scientists. Rima's main contribution is summoning crocodiles to attack their pursuers' canoes. Finally, she is featured in "Return of Atlantis", from October 25, 1980. Aquaman is captured by Queen Ocina when the lost city of Atlantis rises from the sea. Ocina plans to conquer the world with her female warriors, but Wonder Woman and Rima gather the Amazons of Paradise Island to stop her. Note: In breach of both DC Comics' and the Super Friends TV show's continuities, this "Atlantis" is not the kingdom over which Aquaman reigns.

== Other appearances ==
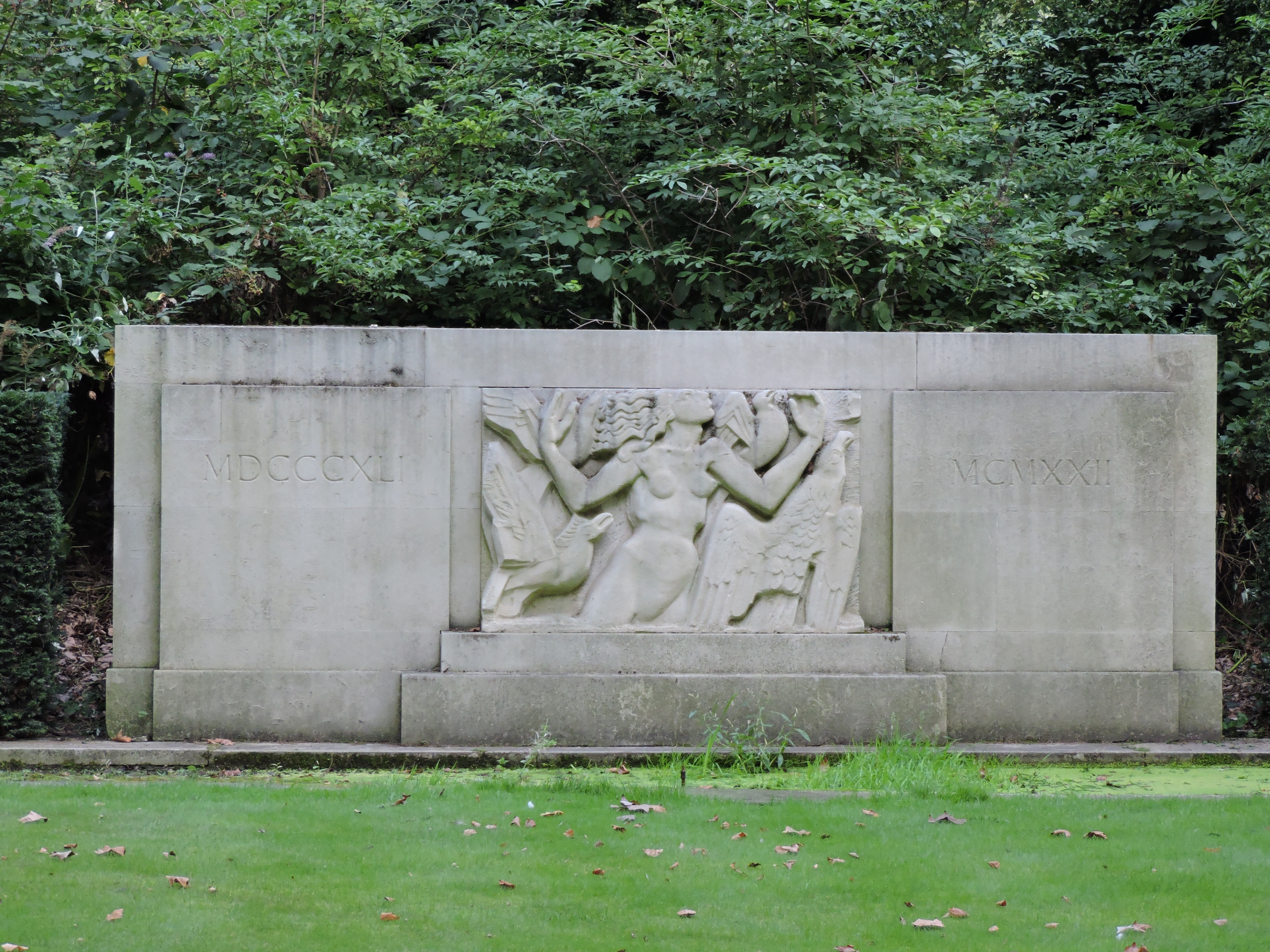
The Hudson Memorial Bird Sanctuary

Rima was mentioned in Ray Bradbury's 1950 short story "The Veldt". Rima was also mentioned in "Watcher in the Shadows" by Geoffrey Household (1960; reissued 2010) and also in "Vane Pursuit" by Charlotte MacLeod (1989).

Dornford Yates mentioned her in Chapter I of his 1931 comic-detective novel Adele and Co., in connection with the Hudson Memorial.

=== Statue ===
The Hudson Memorial in London's Hyde Park, created in 1925, has a bas-relief of Rima the Bird Girl as part of The Hudson Memorial Bird Sanctuary, sculpted by Jacob Epstein.
