= Nyoka the Jungle Girl =

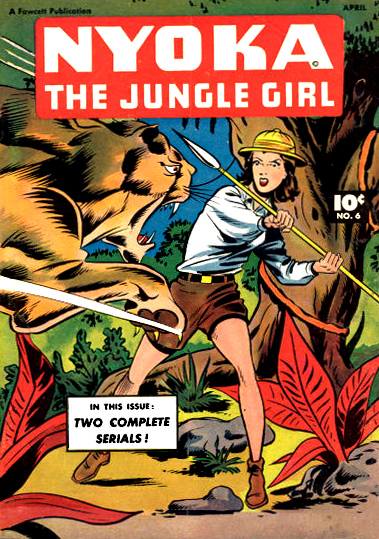
- Nyoka the Jungle Girl #6 (Fawcett Comics, April 1946).

Publication information
- Publisher: Fawcett Comics
- First appearance: 1942
- Created by: Harry Anderson

In-story information
- Alter ego: Nyoka Meredith
Nyoka the Jungle Girl
Publication information
- Publisher: Fawcett Comics
- Format: Standard
- Genre: Adventure
- Publication date: Winter 1942 – Nov. 2005
- No. of issues: (Fawcett) 76 (Charlton) 9 (AC) 7

Nyoka the Jungle Girl is a fictional character created for the screen in the 1941 serial Jungle Girl. After the initial serial and a sequel, Nyoka has appeared in comic books published by Fawcett, Charlton, and AC Comics.

== Origins ==
Beginning in the 1931 issue of Blue Book magazine, Edgar Rice Burroughs serialized a novel under the title of The Land of the Hidden Men. The story was later expanded into the lost world novel Jungle Girl, published in 1932. The novel is set in Cambodia, and the main character is an Asian princess called Fou-tan. Aside from living in a jungle region, she bears no relation to the later Nyoka character, a white woman living in Africa.

== Serials ==
In the Jungle Girl serial, Nyoka Meredith is portrayed by Frances Gifford. The serial is officially based on the Burroughs' Jungle Girl novel, as shown in the credits, although there is no character named Nyoka and no Nyoka-like character in either the novel or the original serialized story.

The serial was popular enough to inspire a sequel, the 1942 serial Perils of Nyoka, starring Kay Aldridge as Nyoka Gordon. Besides the surname, some other details about the character are also changed slightly.

== Comic books ==
Based on the popularity of the serials, Fawcett Comics published Jungle Girl comics, beginning in 1942. The character appeared irregularly until 1953, when Fawcett ceased publication.

According to Jess Nevins' Encyclopedia of Golden Age Superheroes, "Nyoka fights a variety of criminals including gorillas with human brains and Vulture, the queen of a band of Arabian outlaws, whose bodyguard is a giant gorilla named Satan".

Nyoka was one of the intellectual properties sold to Charlton Comics by Fawcett in the 1950s after the National Comics Publications v. Fawcett Publications lawsuit. Her first Charlton appearance was in Nyoka, Jungle Girl #14 (November 1955). Her final Charlton appearance was issue #22 (November 1957).

Once Charlton Comics ceased publication, Nyoka's rights were sold again. AC Comics purchased the rights from Charlton in 1987. Nyoka appeared in AC Comics' The Further Adventures of Nyoka the Jungle Girl. There were five issues printed between 1988 and 1989, consisting mostly of reprints and movie stills. Nyoka has since appeared in other AC Comics' titles.
