= Jo-Jo, Congo King =

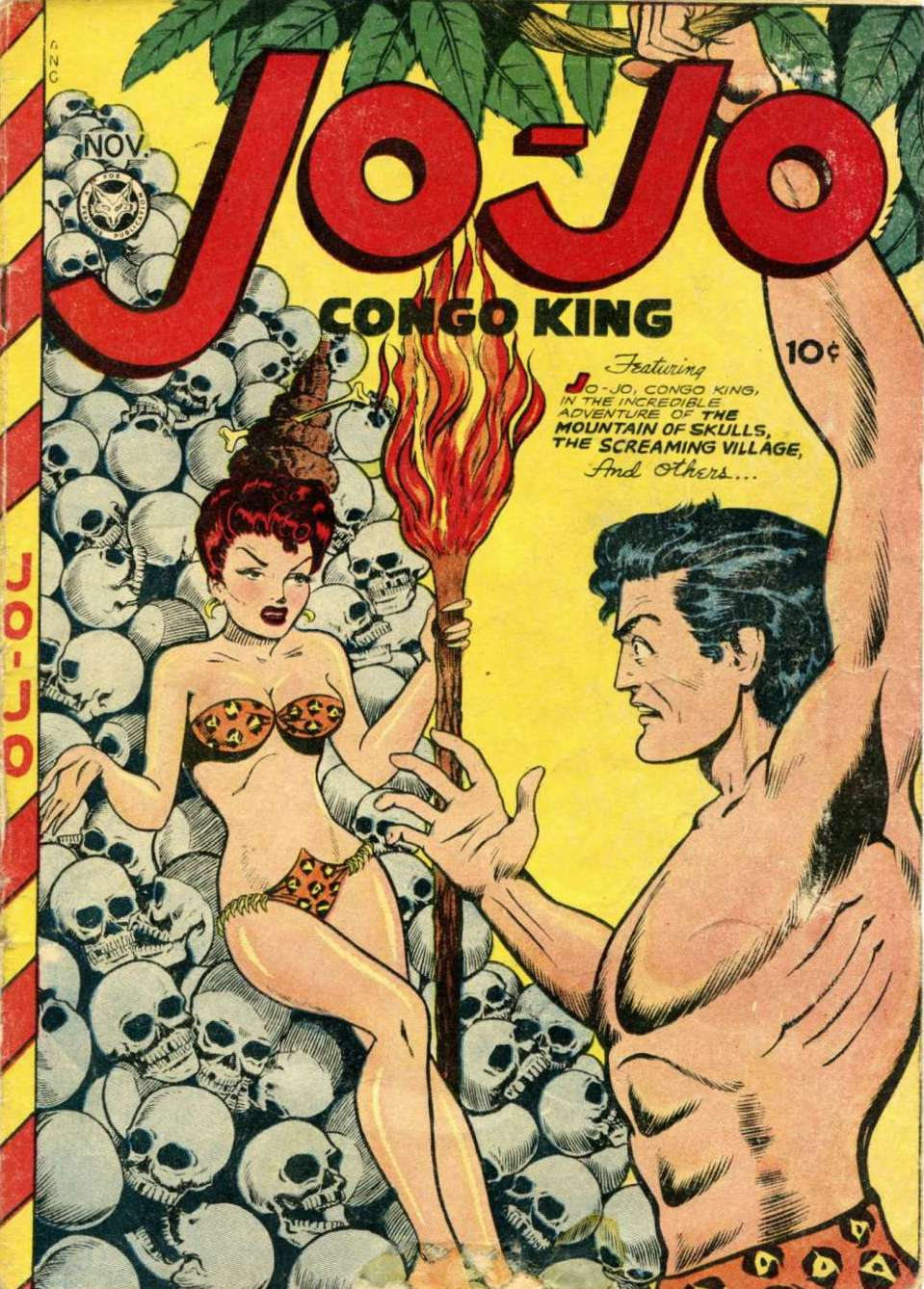
- Jo-Jo on the cover of Jo-Jo, Congo King #8.

Publication information
- Publisher: Fox Feature Syndicate
- First appearance: Jo-Jo, Congo King #7 (July 1947)

Jo-Jo, Congo King is a fictional character that appeared in comic books published by Fox Feature Syndicate. Jo-Jo first appeared in Jo-Jo, Congo King #7 (July 1947).

Jo-Jo's name came from the original title of the comic series, Jo-Jo Comics. The publishers decided to change the format of the title, but kept the name for their new adventure hero. Jo-Jo was another in Fox Feature Syndicate's long line of Tarzanesque characters. Like Tarzan, Jo-Jo wore a loin-cloth, lived in the jungle, and spoke a form of broken English (similar to Johnny Weissmuller's version of Tarzan). Some of the episodes were given credit of Stan Ford (a pseudonym).

Jo-Jo's love interest in the first issue was Gwenna; she was replaced (never to be mentioned again) by Tanee. Both Gwenna and Tanee shared two things in common: they were scantily clad, and they spent a much of their time tied up. Because of the risque images found in the issues of Jo-Jo, many of them provided by Jack Kamen and Matt Baker, Dr. Fredric Wertham mentioned issue #15 in his book Seduction of the Innocent.

According to Jess Nevins' Encyclopedia of Golden Age Superheroes, "Jo-Jo fights wild beasts, wicked white men and natives, the Flaming Fiend, the Mistress of the Apes, the Doctor of Doom, and the Tarantula Men".

The last issue of Jo-Jo, Congo King was #29 (July 1949); the title was then changed to My Desire (a romance comic). Jo-Jo reappeared in 1950, now renamed Jungle Jo. This version ran for four issues.

Fox Feature Syndicate declared bankruptcy in 1950, selling off many of its creative assets. Versions of Jo-Jo appeared in comics produced by various publishers. Star Comics reprinted several Jo-Jo stories under the name "Bombo", and Ajax Comics reprinted one story in 1954 with the character renamed "Kaza".
