= Green Mansions =

1904 novel by William Henry Hudson

Green Mansions: A Romance of the Tropical Forest
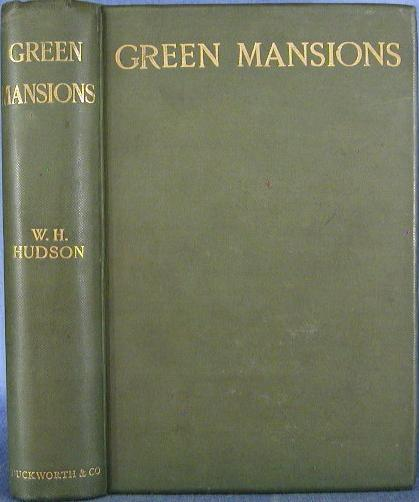
- First edition cover of Green Mansions
- Author: William Henry Hudson
- Language: English
- Genre: Romance novel
- Publisher: Duckworth & Co.
- Publication date: 1904
- Publication place: United Kingdom
- Media type: Print (hardback and paperback)
- ISBN: 0-486-25993-5 (recent edition)
- OCLC: 19779097
- Dewey Decimal: 823/.8 20
- LC Class: PR6015.U23 G7 1989

Green Mansions: A Romance of the Tropical Forest is a 1904 exotic romance by William Henry Hudson about a traveller to the Guyana jungle of southeastern Venezuela and his encounter with a forest-dwelling girl named Rima.

The principal characters are Abel, Rima, Nuflo, Cla-Cla and Kua-kó.

== Plot summary ==
Prologue: An unnamed narrator tells how he befriended an old "Hispano-American" gentleman who never spoke of his past. His interest piqued, the narrator finally elicits the story.

Venezuela, c. 1875. Abel, a young man of wealth, fails at a revolution and flees Caracas into the uncharted forests of Guayana. Surviving fever, failing at journal-keeping and gold hunting, he settles in an Indian village to waste away his life: playing guitar for old Cla-Cla, hunting badly with Kua-kó, telling stories to the children. After some exploring, Abel discovers an enchanting forest where he hears a strange bird-like singing. His Indian friends avoid the forest because of its evil spirit-protector, "the Daughter of the Didi." Persisting in the search, Abel finally finds Rima the Bird Girl. She has dark hair, a smock of spider webs, and can communicate with birds in an unknown tongue. When she shields a coral snake, Abel is bitten and falls unconscious.

Abel awakens in the hut of Nuflo, an elderly man who protects his “granddaughter”, Rima, and refuses to reveal her origins. As Abel recovers, Rima guides him through the forest, and he begins to wonder about her identity and background. Abel later returns to the Indigenous group, but relations become strained because they would kill Rima if given the opportunity. Rima often speaks of her deceased mother, whom she describes as frequently unhappy. Abel gradually falls in love with Rima, but she, aged 17 and unfamiliar with outsiders, is confused by her developing feelings. Their relationship is further complicated because Abel cannot speak her language.

Atop Ytaiao Mountain, Rima questions Abel about "the world" known and unknown, asking him if she was unique and alone. Abel sadly reveals that it is true. However, when he mentions the storied mountains of Riolama, Rima perks up. It turns out that "Riolama" is her real name. Nuflo must know where Riolama is, so a wrathful Rima demands that Nuflo guide her to Riolama under threats of eternal damnation from her sainted mother. Old, guilty and religious, Nuflo caves in to the pressure. Abel pays a last visit to the Indians, but they capture him as a prisoner, suspecting that he is a spy for an enemy tribe or consorts with demons. Abel manages to escape and return to Rima and Nuflo. The three then trek to distant Riolama. Along the way, Nuflo reveals his past, and Rima's origin.

Seventeen years ago, Nuflo led bandits who preyed on Christians and Indians. Eventually, forced to flee to the mountains, they found a cave to live in. Hiding in the cave was a strange woman speaking a bird-like language. She was to be Rima's mother (never named). Nuflo assumed the woman was a saint sent to save his soul. Nuflo left the bandits and carried Rima's mother, now crippled for life, to Voa, a Christian community, to deliver Rima. Rima and her mother talked in their magical language for seven years, until Mother wasted away in the dampness and died. As contrition, Nuflo brought Rima to the drier mountains. The local Indians found her queer, and resented how she chased off game animals, and therefore tried to kill her. A mis-shot dart killed an Indian, and they fled Rima's "magic".

In the cave, Rima is eager to enter Riolama valley. Abel reveals sad news: her mother left because nothing remained. She belonged to a gentle, vegetarian people without weapons, who were wiped out by Indians, plague and other causes. Rima is indeed unique and alone. Rima is saddened but suspected it: her mother was always depressed. Now she decides to return to the forest and prepare a life for herself and Abel. She flits away, leaving Abel to fret as he and Nuflo walk home, delayed by rain and hunger. They return to find the forest silent, Nuflo's hut burned down, and Indians hunting game. Abel, exhausted, is again taken prisoner, but isn't killed, as he quickly makes a vow to go to war against the enemy tribe. On the war trail, he drops hints about Rima and her whereabouts. Kua-Ko explains how, thanks to Abel's "bravery", the Indians dared enter the forbidden forest. They caught Rima in the open, chased her up the giant tree. They heaped brush underneath it and burned Rima.

Abel kills Kua-kó and runs to the enemy tribe, sounding the alarm. Days later he returns. All his Indian friends are dead. He finds the giant tree burned, and collects Rima's ashes in a pot. Trekking homeward, despondent and hallucinating, Abel is helped by Indians and Christians until he reaches the sea, sane and healthy again. Now an old man, his only ambition is to be buried with Rima's ashes. Reflecting back, he believes neither God nor man can forgive his sins, but that gentle Rima would, provided he has forgiven himself.

== Background ==
Hudson based Rima and her lost tribe on persistent rumours about a tribe of white people who lived in the mountains. Temple paintings often showed light-skinned people, and Spanish Conquistadors were purportedly thought to be gods. Green Mansions also features some cryptozoological concepts such as Curupita (Curupira) and Didi purportedly representing giant apes unknown by science.

Many authors of the time also recounted "lost worlds" and "lost tribes", the most successful being H. Rider Haggard, Edgar Rice Burroughs, Robert E. Howard and Arthur Conan Doyle. Hudson's book has endured as literature because of its evocative and lyrical prose, and his naturalist's keen vision of the jungle.

Rima also exemplifies the "natural man", a philosophical notion put forth by Jean-Jacques Rousseau and others, that someone raised away from corrupting civilisation would be naturally pure of heart and attuned to their environment. Tarzan, raised by apes, and Mowgli, raised by wolves, are Rima's literary cousins.

In the Classics Illustrated comic book adaptation, the editor says, "We also feel that Hudson wants to tell us in this story that, long before this present meat-eating and destructive race took over all the world, there was a race of beings on the earth – beautiful, innocent, and bird-like, who lived in peace with nature and themselves, and of whom Rima and her mother were the last".

The plot of the book resembles that in Hudson's 1887 novel A Crystal Age.

== Book publication ==
The book was originally published in 1904. A new edition of this book published in the United States in 1912 with a foreword by John Galsworthy. It was one of the first books published by Alfred A. Knopf and their first bestseller. The book went through nine printings by 1919 and had sold over 20,000 copies. This also created interest in Hudson's other titles.

== Film, TV, theatrical and comic book adaptations ==
In 1937, Louis Gruenberg (1884–1964) composed a radio opera Green Mansions, which used a musical saw in the score.

In 1951, The Gilberton Co. released a comic book adaptation of Green Mansions as issue number 90 in their Classics Illustrated series. Direct quotes from the novel were used. In this adaptation Rima is blonde. The art was by Alex Blum, who drew many other issues of the Classics Illustrated series.

In 1959, the book was adapted into a movie, also entitled Green Mansions, starring Audrey Hepburn as Rima, with Anthony Perkins as Abel. The film, which was directed by Hepburn's husband, Mel Ferrer, was a critical and box office failure.

In the early 1970s, one of the more unusual adaptations of Green Mansions occurred when DC Comics launched the comic book Rima the Jungle Girl, featuring the title character recast as a Sheena-like action hero. This version of the character later appeared on the animated TV series Super Friends.

Rima the Jungle Girl returned to the DC Universe in a new pulp-era comic debuting in 2010 entitled First Wave. Rima was portrayed as a South American native with piercings and tattoos, who didn't speak, but communicated in bird-like whistles. Plying a big knife and a panther, she helped Doc Savage's assistant Johnny Littlejohn, then disappeared back into the forest.

In her 1973 story The Girl Who Was Plugged In, James Tiptree Jr.'s character Paul Isham III finds inspiration from the novel to abduct and rescue a beautiful but ill-fated young girl named Delphi—unbeknownst to him, an advertising puppet operated by a deformed pilot—whom Isham identifies with Rima.
