= Perils of Nyoka =

1942 film by William Witney

- Theatrical release poster for Chapter 6 of the serial
- Directed by: William Witney
- Written by: Ronald Davidson; Norman S. Hall; William Liveley; Joseph O'Donnell; Joseph F. Poland; Edgar Rice Burroughs (character)
- Produced by: William J. O'Sullivan
- Starring: Kay Aldridge; Clayton Moore; Lorna Gray; Charles Middleton; William Benedict; Forbes Murray; George Pembroke
- Cinematography: Reggie Lanning
- Distributed by: Republic Pictures
- Release dates: June 27, 1942 (U.S. serial); April 2, 1952 (U.S. re-release)
- Running time: 15 chapters (261 minutes) (serial); 100 minutes (TV)
- Language: English
- Budget: $169,296 (negative cost: $175,010)

Perils of Nyoka is a 1942 Republic serial directed by William Witney. It stars Kay Aldridge as Nyoka the Jungle Girl, a character who first appeared in the Edgar Rice Burroughs-inspired serial Jungle Girl.

== Plot ==
Nyoka, with help from Larry Grayson, attempts to discover the golden tablets of Hippocrates. The tablets contain the medical knowledge of the ancients and are being buried along with gold and other treasure. The search for the tablets take Larry and Nyoka from the jungles of Africa to the Arabian desert where Queen Vultura and her band of sword-wielding Arabs are also searching for them. As the search continues, Larry saves Nyoka from all manners of peril to include being captured and imprisoned by Vultura and Satan, her pet gorilla.

Vultura succeeds in finding the tablets but Larry and Nyoka track her down and invade her lair. While Larry and the rest of the expedition battle Vultura's men outside the hide-away, Nyoka and Vultura battle each other inside, a spirited hand-to-hand fight that concludes when Satan throws a spear at Nyoka but misses her and instead, kills Vultura. Larry, having successfully won the outside battle against Vultura's men, enters the lair, shoots Satan, saves Nyoka, and recovers the tablets.

== Cast ==
=== Main cast ===
- Kay Aldridge as Nyoka Gordon
- Clayton Moore as Dr. Larry Grayson
- Lorna Gray as Vultura, Ruler of the Arabs
- Charles Middleton as Cassib
- William Benedict as Red Davis
- Forbes Murray as Prof Douglas Campbell
- George Pembroke as John Spencer
- Tristram Coffin as Benito Torrini
- Forrest Taylor as Translator

=== Supporting cast ===
- Forbes Murray as Professor Douglas Campbell
- Robert Strange as Professor Henry Gordon
- George Pembroke as John Spencer
- Georges Renavent as Maghreb, Vultura's high priest
- John Davidson as Lhoba, Tuareg high priest
- George J. Lewis as Batan, Arab henchman
- Ken Terrell as Ahmed, Arab henchman
- John Bagni as Ben Ali
- Kenne Duncan as Abou, expedition headman
- Emil Van Horn as Satan the gorilla (Van Horn also played the gorilla in Jungle Girl).

== Production ==
Perils of Nyoka was budgeted at $169,296 although the final negative cost was $175,010 (a $5,714, or 3.4%, overspend), making it the most expensive Republic serial of 1942. It was filmed between March 20 and May 2, 1942, with the outdoor action sequences shot primarily at the Iverson Movie Ranch in Chatsworth, California.

The success of the original serial Jungle Girl prompted the sequel, but the studio did not want to pay licensing fees to Burroughs again, so it avoided any repetition of the term Jungle Girl, for which he owned the rights. Nyoka, the name of the main character in the first film, was instead placed in the title of the sequel, as that name was an original creation of Republic's writers, not of Burroughs. The word "jungle" was avoided in the film, with the setting described as an African "desert", though the area shown was not nearly as arid as is the Sahara.

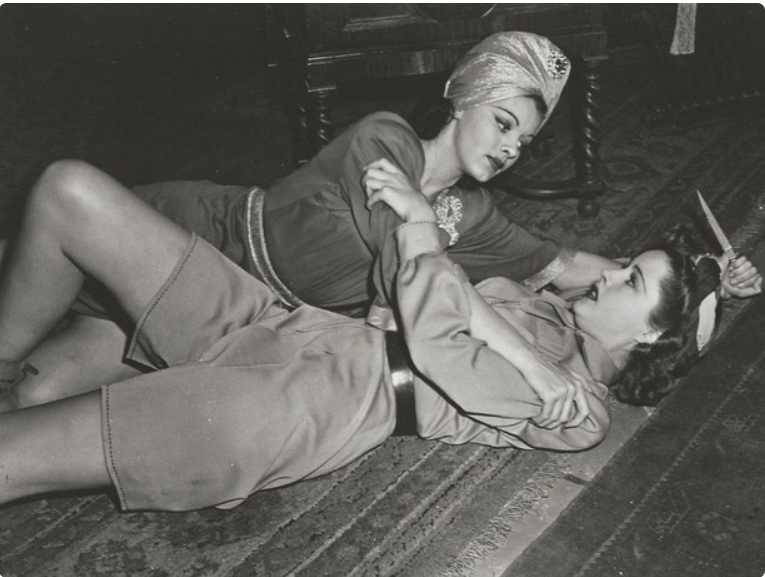
Queen Vultura battles Nyoka

Republic cast Aldridge in place of the popular Frances Gifford because Gifford was on loan from another studio for Jungle Girl and was not available for Perils as she had moved on from serials to feature films. The success and popularity that Aldridge gained from the role made her the star of several other Republic serials.

In his autobiography, director William Witney stated that the studio used a different actress to ensure that there would be no actionable copyright infringement.

Nyoka was one of the few serials where the serial heroine was opposed by a serial villainess, in this case Vultura, played by Lorna Gray. In the decades since the serial's release, reviewers have noted that it was unusual for the lead women to fight each other. The climatic fight between Aldridge, attractively attired in jungle shorts, and Gray also attractively attired in a revealing sarong, occurred in the serial's final chapter when Vultura attempts to escape with a valuable treasure, only to be confronted by Nyoka. "The wrestling match between the two girls, their naked legs entwined, had something for everyone." Watching the women fight was Vultura's pet gorilla who, seeing that Nyoka was winning the fight, launched a spear at her, but missed and instead killed Vultura.

== Release ==
=== Theatrical ===
Perils of Nyoka's official release date was June 27, 1942, but that is actually the date upon which the seventh chapter was made available to film exchanges. The serial was re-released on April 2, 1952 under the new title Nyoka and the Tigermen, between the first runs of Radar Men from the Moon and Zombies of the Stratosphere.

=== Television ===
Perils of Nyoka was one of 26 Republic serials rereleased for television in 1966 under the Century 66 label. The title of the film was changed to Nyoka and the Lost Secrets of Hippocrates. This version was trimmed to 100 minutes in length.

== Reception ==
Jim Harmon and Donald F. Glut have written that Perils of Nyoka was probably the best jungle-type serial ever made and that it "lavished in increased production values". Cline noted that Perils of Nyoka stood out in the memories of the original serial audiences, despite the strong competition of 1942.

== Chapter titles ==
1. Desert Intrigue (26:50)
2. Death's Chariot (17:09)
3. Devil's Crucible (16:52)
4. Ascending Doom (16:48)
5. Fatal Second (16:49)
6. Human Sacrifice (16:41)
7. Monster's Clutch (16:47)
8. Tuareg Vengeance (16:44)
9. Buried Alive (16:41)
10. Treacherous Trail (16:51)
11. Unknown Peril (16:40)
12. Underground Tornado (16:39)
13. Thundering Death (16:43)
14. Blazing Barrier (16:38)
15. Satan's Fury (16:33)

_{Source:}

== See also ==
- Jungle girl, character type
- Jungle Girl (1941), an earlier Nyoka serial
- Damsel in distress
- List of film serials
- List of film serials by studio

Preceded by Spy Smasher (1942)	Republic Serial; Perils of Nyoka (1942)	Succeeded by King of the Mounties (1942)
