= Jungle Girl (serial) =

1941 film by John English, William Witney

- Theatrical release poster for Chapter 1 of the serial
- Directed by: William Witney; John English
- Written by: Alfred Batson; Ronald Davidson; Norman S. Hall; William Lively; Joseph O'Donnell; Joseph F. Poland; Edgar Rice Burroughs(novel)
- Produced by: Hiram S. Brown Jr.
- Starring: Frances Gifford; Tom Neal; Trevor Bardette; Gerald Mohr; Eddie Acuff; Frank Lackteen
- Cinematography: Reggie Lanning
- Distributed by: Republic Pictures
- Release dates: June 21, 1941 (U.S. serial); April 19, 1947 (U.S. re-release)
- Running time: 15 chapters (265 min)
- Country: United States
- Language: English
- Budget: $171,415 (negative cost: $177,404) or $250,000
- Box office: $900,000

Jungle Girl is a 1941 15-chapter Republic serial starring Frances Gifford. It was directed by William Witney and John English based on the novel Jungle Girl (1932) by Edgar Rice Burroughs. It was the 22nd of the 66 serials produced by Republic.

== Plot ==
Dr. John Meredith, ashamed at the crime spree of his evil twin brother, Bradley, travels with his daughter, Nyoka, to Africa. There his skills as a doctor displace Shamba, the resident witch doctor of the Masamba. Years later, Slick Latimer and Bradley Meredith arrive looking for a local diamond mine and team up with the disgruntled Shamba. Bradley kills his brother John and takes his place. They also bring along Jack Stanton and Curly Rogers, who promptly join Nyoka in trying to stop the villains.

== Cast ==
- Frances Gifford as Nyoka Meredith. Gifford was borrowed from Paramount for the lead.
- Tom Neal as Jack Stanton
- Trevor Bardette as Dr John Meredith/Bradley Meredith
- Gerald Mohr as Slick Latimer
- Eddie Acuff as Curly Rogers
- Frank Lackteen as Shamba
- Tommy Cook as Kimbu
- Robert Barron as Bombo
- Al Kikume as Chief Lutembi
- Bunny the Elephant as Veela
- Emil Van Horn was the man inside the gorilla suit.

== Production ==
The serial was officially based on Edgar Rice Burroughs' Jungle Girl novel. Nevertheless, it bore almost no resemblance to the novel, which had no character named "Nyoka" and was about an Asian princess, not a white woman living in Africa. Like many Republic adaptations, the contract to use a character called the Jungle Girl meant that showings of the serial after a set date were banned.

Filming on Jungle Girl took place between March 25 and May 9, 1941. At 45 days, this shares the title of second longest shoot for a Republic serial with Secret Service in Darkest Africa (1943). The serial's production number was 1096.

The serial's production budget $171,415 but the negative cost rose to $177,404 (over budget by $5,989, or 3.5%). This was the most expensive Republic serial of 1941.

Jungle Girl was the first sound serial to have a female lead.

The serial was successful enough that a semi-sequel, Perils of Nyoka, was produced in 1942. To avoid paying Burroughs a second time for the rights, the sequel used only the original material created by Republic Pictures for Jungle Girl (such as the name Nyoka). It did not use any of Burroughs' material or the title of his novel.

=== Stunts ===
- Yakima Canutt – Ram Rod/Stunt Coordinator
- David Sharpe as Nyoka/Jack Stanton (doubling Tom Neal & Frances Gifford)
- Helen Thurston as Nyoka (doubling Frances Gifford)
- Tom Steele as Slick Latimer (doubling Gerald Mohr)
- Duke Taylor as Curly Rogers (doubling Eddie Acuff)
- Ken Terrell as the Meredith brothers (doubling Trevor Bardette)

Dave Sharpe only doubled for Frances Gifford in the vine-swinging scenes. According to director William Witney, when Gifford first saw Sharpe in her costume she commented that he looked prettier than she did. All of Gifford's non-vine swinging stunts were performed by Helen Thurston.

=== Special effects ===
The effects in this serial were, as with all Republic serials, produced by the Lydecker brothers.

== Release ==
=== Theatrical 1941 ===
Jungle Girl's official release date is 21 June 1941, although this is actually the date the seventh chapter was made available to film exchanges.

The serial was re-released on 19 April 1947 between the first runs of Son of Zorro and Jesse James Rides Again. It was the first Republic serial to be re-released in this way.

== Chapter titles ==
1. Death by Voodoo (27min 53s)
2. Queen of Beasts (17min 11s)
3. River of Fire (16min 45s)
4. Treachery (16min 43s)
5. Jungle Vengeance (16min 44s)
6. Tribal Fury (16min 55s)
7. The Poison Dart (16min 39s)
8. Man Trap (16min 50s)
9. Treasure Tomb (16min 43s)
10. Jungle Killer (17min 41s)
11. Dangerous Secret (16min 41s)
12. Trapped (16min 44s)
13. Ambush (16min 40s)
14. Diamond Trail (16min 53s)
15. Flight to Freedom (17min 28s)

_{Source:}

=== Theatrical 1942 ===
Perils of Nyoka is a 1942 Republic serial directed by William Witney. It stars Kay Aldridge as Nyoka the Jungle Girl, a character who first appeared in the Edgar Rice Burroughs-inspired serial Jungle Girl.

== Remade as Panther Girl of the Kongo ==
In 1955 Republic's penultimate serial was the 12-part Panther Girl of the Kongo starring Phyllis Coates as Jean Evans. This was essentially a low-budget reworking of the Jungle Girl character. Coates, who resembles Francis Gifford, wears an identical costume. This made it possible to reuse a significant amount of footage from the 1941 series, thus saving on production costs. Many of the stunts and action sequences (Panther Girl riding an elephant, swinging on vines, diving off a cliff, etc.) were taken from Jungle Girl.

== Jungle Girl tribute/documentary ==
In 1984, filmmaker Richard Myers produced a documentary/experimental film, also titled Jungle Girl, which included audio interviews with Frances Gifford in which she discusses her career and the shooting of the film. The visual part of the film is an impressionistic recreation of moments from the serial. Myers, as a child, was strongly influenced by this serial and he used this creative process to explore his own childhood and his love of movies.
