= Jungle Girl (novel) =

1932 novel by Edgar Rice Burroughs

- Dust jacket from the first edition
- Author: Edgar Rice Burroughs
- Illustrator: Studley O. Burroughs
- Cover artist: Studley O. Burroughs
- Language: English
- Genre: Fantasy novel, Lost world
- Publisher: ERB, Inc.
- Publication date: April 15, 1932
- Publication place: United States
- Media type: Print (Hardback)
- Pages: 318

Jungle Girl is a novel by American writer Edgar Rice Burroughs, set in a forgotten kingdom in the jungles of Cambodia.

Burroughs started the novel in 1929 (2 October) under the working title The Dancing Girl of the Leper King. It was first run serially in five installments from May to September 1931 by Blue Book Magazine under the title The Land of Hidden Men. The book version was first published by Edgar Rice Burroughs, Inc., on 15 April 1932. Ace Paperback has republished the book in paperback several times, again under the title The Land of Hidden Men.

This illustration by Laurence Herndon was used as the cover art for the issue of Blue Book in which the first installment of The Land of the Hidden Men appeared

== In other media ==
A 15-episode film serial was produced in 1941, but it was set in Africa and the story bore no relation to the plot of the novel.

In October 18, 2014, Edgar Rice Burroughs, Inc., began a paid webcomic on their official website, by Martin Powell (script), Will Meugniot (art) and Jo Meugniot (colors). In May 2015, Nik Poliwko replaced Will Meugniot, In July 2018, Poliwko was replaced by Arianna Farricella.

== See also ==
- Jungle Girl (1941 serial)
- Perils of Nyoka (1942 serial)
- Nyoka the Jungle Girl
