= Kay Aldridge =

American actress and model

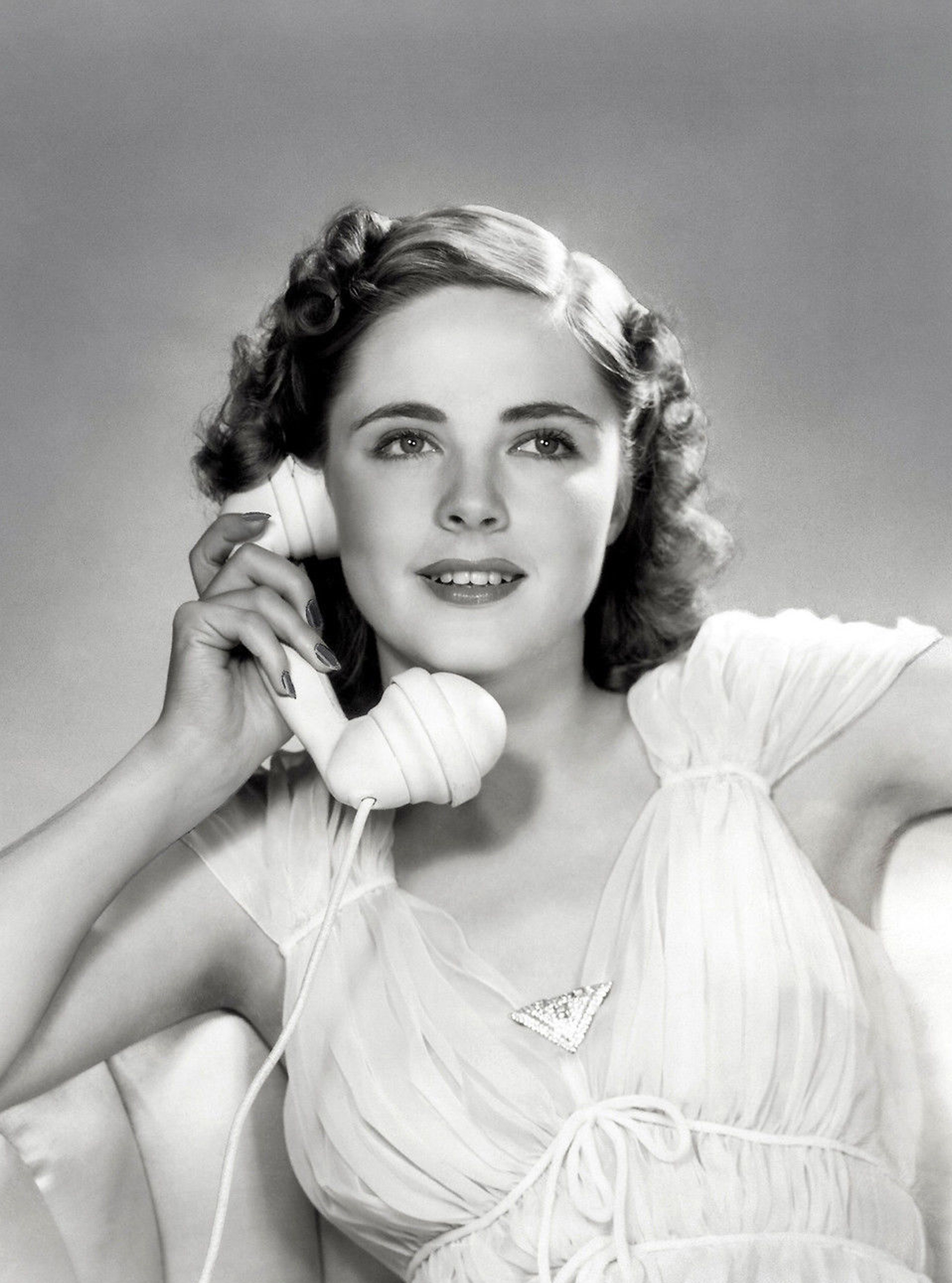
- Kay Aldridge, c. 1940s
- Born: Katharine Gratten Aldridge; July 9, 1917; Tallahassee, Florida, US
- Died: January 12, 1995 (aged 77); Rockport, Maine, US
- Occupations: Actress, model
- Years active: 1937–45
- Spouses: Arthur Cameron (m. 1945–1954) Richard Tucker (m. 1956–1979) Harry Nasland (m. 1982–1983)
- Children: 4

Katharine ("Kay") Gratten Aldridge (July 9, 1917 – January 12, 1995) was an American actress and model, best known for playing feisty and imperiled heroines in black-and-white serials during the 1940s.

== Life and work ==
Aldridge was born on July 9, 1917, in Tallahassee, Florida. Her father was a surveyor and her mother was an artist and writer. Following her father's death when she was two years old, her mother moved the family to Lyells, Virginia, where she and her four siblings were raised with the help of her great aunts, who were schoolteachers. After attending her first year of high school in Westminster, Maryland, she enrolled in St. Mary's Female Seminary (now St. Mary's College of Maryland) in St. Mary's City, Maryland. While at St. Mary's, she acted in plays, played basketball, and was a member of the Delta Phi Epsilon sorority.

Following her high-school graduation in 1934, Aldridge found work with the John Powers modeling agency in New York. She appeared on the covers of magazines such as Life, Ladies' Home Journal, Redbook, and Look. Contemporary artist Anne Taintor used advertisements featuring Aldridge as the base for a number of her pieces. In 1937, Aldridge was chosen as one of the 10 most photographed girls in the world, and was selected to go to Hollywood to appear in the United Artists film Vogues of 1938.

In 1939, she signed a contract with 20th Century Fox, and in the next few years, landed a number of minor and largely decorative roles, credited as Katherine Aldridge. The films she made during this period include Shooting High (1940) playing Evelyn Trent, Sailor's Lady (1940) playing Georgine, Down Argentine Way (1940) playing Helen Carson, and Dead Men Tell (1941) playing Laura Thursday. She was among the actresses screen tested for the part of Scarlett O'Hara in Gone With the Wind.

After her contract with 20th Century Fox expired in 1941, she was approached by Republic Pictures to star in an upcoming film serial. Although she considered serial work a "comedown" from being a featured player at Fox, she accepted the offer because it offered her a lead role and a salary of about $650 a week, good money at the time. Her first serial for Republic was Perils of Nyoka (1942), which offered dramatic cliffhanger scenes at the end of each episode. Now credited as Kay Aldridge, she played the character Nyoka Gordon, who confronts a host of villains while seeking her father, who was lost on an expedition in Africa. It was her most popular role. Further classic serial heroine roles followed with titles such as Daredevils of the West in 1943 and Haunted Harbor in 1944. She retired from acting in 1945.

Aldridge was married three times: to Arthur Cameron from 1945 to 1954, to Richard Derby Tucker from 1956 until his death in 1979, and lastly to Harry Nasland from 1982 until his death in 1983. In her later years she lived in Camden, Maine, and was a locally renowned hostess.

Aldridge died of a heart attack on January 12, 1995, in Rockport, Maine. She is interred at Sea View Cemetery in Rockport.

== Filmography ==
- Vogues of 1938 (1937) - Katherine (uncredited)
- Rosalie (1937) - Lady in Waiting (uncredited)
- Hotel for Women (1939) - Melinda Craig
- Here I Am a Stranger (1939) - Lillian Bennett
- Free, Blonde and 21 (1940) - Adelaide Sinclair
- Shooting High (1940) - Evelyn Trent
- Girl in 313 (1940) - Sarah Sorrell
- Sailor's Lady (1940) - Georgine
- Girl from Avenue A (1940) - Lucy
- Yesterday's Heroes (1940) - Janice Mason
- Down Argentine Way (1940) - Helen Carson
- Golden Hoofs (1941) - Cornelia Hunt
- Dead Men Tell (1941) - Laura Thursday
- Navy Blues (1941) - Navy Blues Sextette Member #1
- Louisiana Purchase (1941) - Louisiana Belle
- You're in the Army Now (1941) - Navy Blues Sextette Member #1
- The Playgirls (1941, Short) - Sextette Member
- Perils of Nyoka (1942) - Nyoka Gordon
- The Falcon's Brother (1942) - Victory Gown Model (uncredited)
- Something to Shout About (1943) - Show Girl (uncredited)
- Daredevils of the West (1943) - June Foster
- DuBarry Was a Lady (1943) - Mrs. McGowan (uncredited)
- Haunted Harbor (1944) - Patricia Harding
- The Man Who Walked Alone (1945) - Wilhelmina Hammond
- The Phantom of 42nd Street (1945) - Claudia Moore (final film role)
