= Len Brown (comics) =

American comic book writer (1941–2026)

Leonard Albert Brown (October 7, 1941 – August 11, 2026) was an American writer, editor, radio personality and comic book scripter, best known as the co-creator of T.H.U.N.D.E.R. Agents and Mars Attacks.

Born in Brooklyn, Brown began working in the Product Development Department of Topps Chewing Gum shortly after he graduated from high school. As a creative editor, working with department head Woody Gelman, Brown developed ideas for both sports and non-sports cards, a position which put him in contact with leading comic book artists, who illustrated Topps humor cards. During his 41 years at Topps, Brown contributed to such series as Civil War News, Garbage Pail Kids and Wacky Packages.

== Mars Attacks ==
In 1962, inspired by Wally Wood's cover for EC Comics' Weird Science #16, Brown pitched the idea of Mars Attacks to Gelman. Gelman and Brown devised the storyline of a Martian invasion. They recruited Wood to visualize situations in rough sketches and hired Bob Powell to pencil the project. Norman Saunders painted the 55-card set, later adapted into the 1996 feature film.

== T.H.U.N.D.E.R. Agents ==
To launch the bimonthly comic book, T.H.U.N.D.E.R. Agents (Tower Comics) in 1965, Wally Wood and Brown discussed a superhero concept Brown had outlined to Wood a year earlier. Brown recalled, "Wally had remembered my concept and asked me to write a 12-page origin story. I submitted a Captain Thunderbolt story in which he fought a villain named Dynamo." To write the story, Brown drew on his memories of both Captain Marvel and the Thunder Riders in the 1935 serial The Phantom Empire, as he recalled, "I had always loved the old Phantom Empire serial with Gene Autry in the 1930s. I remembered that the Thunder Riders were the agents of the evil queen in the serial. I always loved the name, the Thunder Riders, so I recommended Thunder Agents to Wally." With a few changes by Wood and a title obviously inspired by the success of the spy-fi TV series The Man from U.N.C.L.E. and the then current James Bond film Thunderball, the series got underway.

In addition to his scripts for T.H.U.N.D.E.R. Agents, Brown was a contributor to Creepy, Skywald's Nightmare and other comic books. He scripted for Mars Attacks when Topps introduced its line of comics in the 1990s. He also wrote several paperbacks about trading cards, country music and rock, including the Encyclopedia of Country and Western Music (1971).

== Radio ==
His interest in classic country music led him into DJ work with several New Jersey radio stations (WTTM, WNJN, WDVR). In 2000, Brown and his wife Abby relocated to Dripping Springs, Texas, where he launched classic country music programs on KDRP-FM and Austin's KOOP (FM).

== Death ==
Brown died in Bee Cave, Texas, on August 11, 2026, at the age of 84.

== Awards ==
In 1965, Brown won two Alley Awards (Best Giant Comic, Best New Strip or Book) as co-creator of T.H.U.N.D.E.R. Agents.

== Bibliography ==
- Encyclopedia of Rock 'n Roll (with Gary Friedrich) Tower Books, 1971.
- So You Think You Know Rock & Roll (with Gary Friedrich) Tower Books, 1971.
- Encyclopedia of Country and Western Music (with Gary Friedrich) Tower Books, 1971.
- The Great Old Bubble Gum Cards and Some Cigarette Cards (with Woody Gelman) Prime Press, 1977.
- Great Old Bubblegum Cards Outlet, 1978.
- Marvel Comics Postcard Book (with Woody Gelman) Marvel, 1978.
