= Mars Attacks =

Trading card series

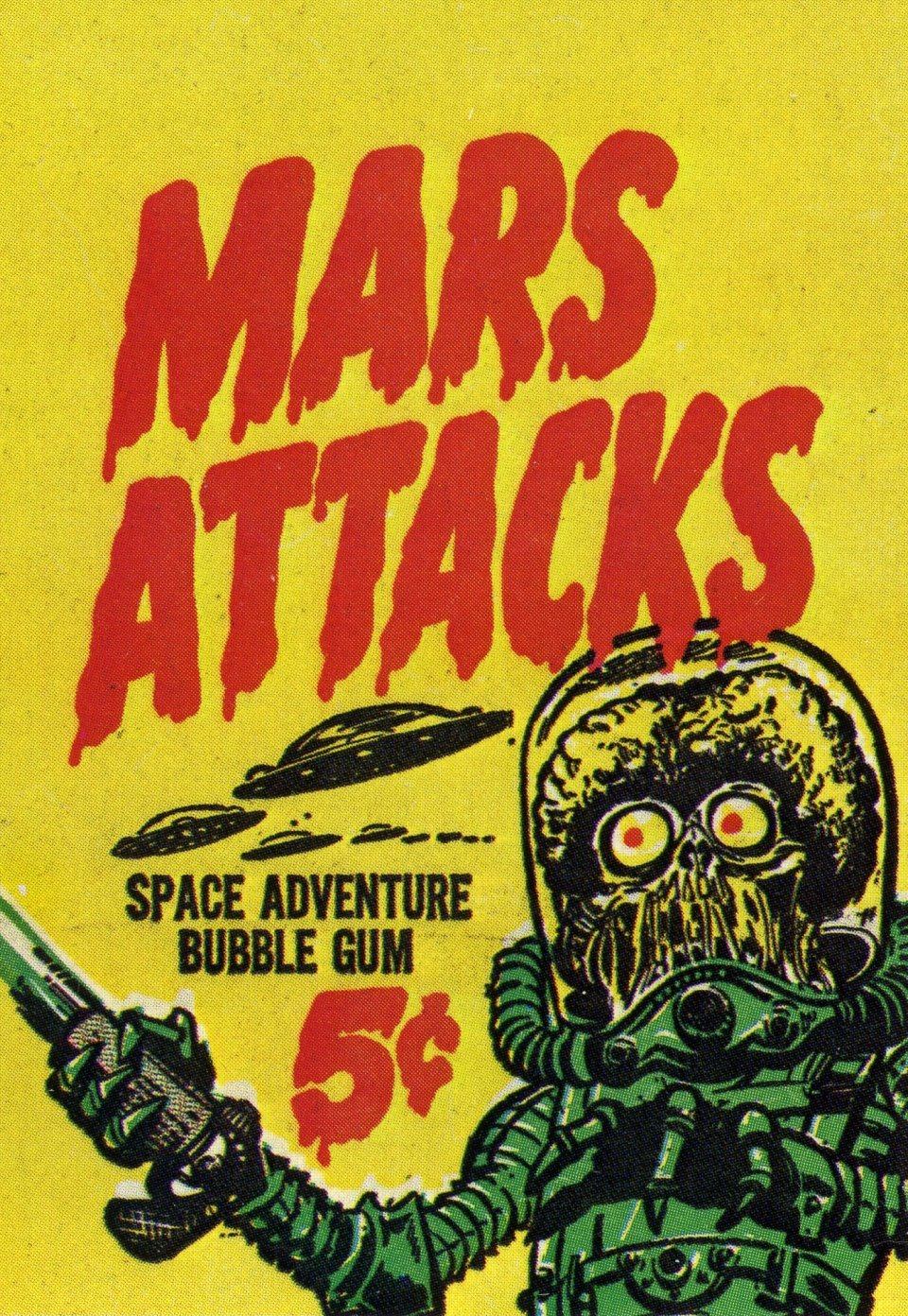
- Card wrapper for the original 1962 release of the series
- Other names: Attack from Space
- Type: Trading cards
- Invented by: Len Brown
- Company: Topps
- Country: United States
- Availability: 1962–present
- Features: Mars in fiction

Mars Attacks is a science fiction–themed trading card series released in 1962 by Topps. The cards feature artwork by science fiction artists Wally Wood and Norman Saunders.

The cards form a story arc, which tells of the invasion of Earth by cruel, hideous Martians under the command of a corrupt Martian government who conceal the fact from the Martian populace that Mars is doomed to explode and, therefore, proposes colonization of Earth to turn it into their new homeworld. The cards depict futuristic battle scenes and bizarre methods of Martian attack, torture and slaughter of humans, as well as various Earth nations being attacked. The story concludes with an expeditionary force of humans volunteering to embark on a counterattack on Mars, in which the Earth attack forces attack the Martians in their own manner (i.e., bayoneting and shooting them). The Earth attack forces, after destroying the Martian cities and killing the Martians, depart just before Mars is destroyed in the predicted cataclysm, thus ensuring the peace and safety of Earth as the Martian race is seemingly doomed to extinction. Backstories included how the invading Martians used growth rays to transform insects into monsters to attack cities, differing geographic regions dealing with the Martian invasion, Earth factions such as rival urban gangs and national differences having to be cast aside for the sake of repelling the invasion, or the sociology of Mars, in this case a small tribe of peaceful Martians who hoped to find a way to escape the destruction of Mars without attacking Earth, but their voice being overruled by the corrupt Martian government.

The cards proved popular with children, but depictions of explicit gore and implied sexual content caused an outcry, leading the company to halt production. The cards have since become collector's items, with certain cards commanding over $3,500 at auction.

In the 1980s, Topps began developing merchandise based on the Mars Attacks storyline, including mini-comic books and card reprints. An expanded set of 100 cards called Mars Attacks Archives was issued in 1994 by Topps and spawned a second round of merchandising. Director Tim Burton released a feature film called Mars Attacks! in 1996 based on the series, spawning a third round of merchandising, including two comic book intercompany crossovers with the Image Universe titled Mars Attacks The Savage Dragon, published by Topps Comics, and Mars Attacks Image, published by Image Comics. In 2012, Topps released a 50th anniversary expanded set of 75 cards called Mars Attacks Heritage, leading to a fourth round of merchandising that continued into 2017 with the release of an official sequel series, Mars Attacks: The Revenge!

== Trading cards ==
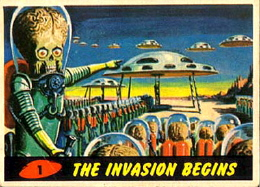
Card #1: "The Invasion Begins"

The trading card series Mars Attacks was created by Topps in 1962. Product developer Len Brown, inspired by Wally Wood's cover for EC Comics' Weird Science #16, pitched the idea to Woody Gelman. Gelman and Brown created the story—with Brown writing the copy—and created rough sketches. They enlisted Wood to flesh out the sketches and Bob Powell to finish them. Norman Saunders painted most of the 55-card set (Maurice Blumenfeld painted 10–20% of them, but Saunders provided the finishing touches to all of the images).

The cards, which sold for five cents per pack of five, were test marketed by Topps through the dummy corporation Bubbles, Inc. under the name Attack from Space. Sales were sufficient to expand the marketing and the name was changed to Mars Attacks. The cards sparked parental and community outrage over their graphic violence and implied sexuality. Topps responded initially by repainting 13 of the 55 cards to reduce the gore and sexuality. However, inquiries from a district attorney in Connecticut about the content on the cards caused Topps to halt production of the series altogether before the replacements could even be printed.

== Adaptations and merchandising ==
In 1980, the Mars Attacks Portfolio of Roughs was released by Darkstar Marketing as a limited edition of 1,200. It collected preliminary concept art by Wally Wood and Bob Powell that was used in the creation of the original Mars Attacks cards.

In 1984, one of the first official items was released since the original cards appeared: a direct copy of the original series of 55 cards, plus a 56th card that reprinted the wrapper graphics, was released by Renata Galasso Inc., through an agreement with Topps.

In 1995, one year after the first of two expanded versions of the cards, Mars Attacks Archives, was released (see Further trading card series below), Screamin' Productions and Topps released a tie-in set of eight Mars Attacks vinyl model kits with an accompanying series of eight new trading cards, each one inside one of the kits. Bonus items that could be acquired by sending in proof-of-purchase certificates from all eight of the kits were two new nearly identical bonus cards (one oversized card with the Mars Attacks logo on the top of it and one regular-sized card without it) and a limited edition ninth vinyl model kit.

In 1996, Warner Bros. released Tim Burton's feature film adaptation Mars Attacks!. In conjunction, two hardcover novels were released: Mars Attacks: Martian Deathtrap by Nathan Archer; and Mars Attacks: War Dogs of the Golden Horde by Ray W. Murrill. Each contained two new trading cards inside the middle of each book (the paperback editions, however, did not have the trading cards inside them). A paperback movie tie-in novelization by the film's screenwriter Jonathan Gems was also published. Trendmasters also produced a series of vinyl toy figures based on the film.

In 2012, to commemorate the franchise's 50th anniversary, Topps partnered with a variety of companies on comic books (via IDW Publishing), bobbleheads and vinyl figures (Funko Pop!), action figures and plush toys (Mezco Toyz), costumes (Incogneato), statues and busts (Quarantine Studio), electronics skins (Gelaskins) and a commemorative hardcover book and 2013 wall calendar, both with nearly identical sets of four new trading cards (the only difference being that the book's cards had white borders on the front of the cards and the calendar's cards had green borders) (Abrams Books).

A licensed sourcebook written by David Levine appeared for the fourth edition of the tabletop role-playing game system GURPS. This included artwork taken from both the cards and the comics.

A park management video game based on the franchise titled Mars Attracts was released on Steam in early access in 2025.

=== Further trading card series ===
In 1994, Topps re-released the cards as an expanded version titled Mars Attacks Archives, with the original 55 cards and 45 "New Visions" cards. The 45 new cards are further divided into a #0 card, three subsets ("The Unpublished 11" (with 11 cards)), "Mars Attacks: The Comics" (with 10 cards) and "Visions: New and Original" a.k.a. "New Visions" (with 22 cards)) and one card titled "Norm Saunders: A Self-Portrait". Twenty-one artists collaborated on the new cards, including Zina Saunders, the daughter of the original artist Norman Saunders.

In 2012, Topps re-released the original 55-card series again as a second expanded version titled Mars Attacks Heritage, including two subsets ("Deleted Scenes" (with 10 cards) and "Guide to the New Universe" (with 15 cards)).

In 2013, Topps issued Mars Attacks: Invasion, a reboot series of 95 trading cards featuring a new story (Mars Attacks: Invasion (cards #1–58, plus a #0 promo card from the 2013 San Diego Comic-Con)) with new artwork cards (divided into "Mars Invades IDW" (cards #59–77 and #91–92) and "Art of Mars Attacks" (cards #78–90 and #93–95)) and including four new subsets ("Mars Attacks: Early Missions" (with six cards), "Mars Attacks Masterpieces" (with five cards), "Join the Fight!" (with four cards) and "Anatomy of a Martian" (also with six cards)). This was the last Mars Attacks trading card series to be sold in retail stores as of this date; all other such series have been sold online ever since.

A second series of trading cards, Mars Attacks: Occupation, also featuring a third reboot series of 81 trading cards that picked up where Mars Attacks: Invasion left off (Mars Attacks: Occupation (cards #1–45) with new artwork cards (divided into "Art of Mars Attacks" (cards #46–63), "Factions" (cards #64–72), "Occupation Profiles" (cards #73–78) and "The Kickstarter Video" (cards #79–81)) and including six new subsets ("Mars Attacks Superstars", Mars Attacks: Then and Now!", "Mars Attacks All-Star Art" and "Dinosaurs Attack! vs. Mars Attacks" (each with nine cards (the last one of which was also available as a Heritage card set and as a foil card set))), "Attacky Packages" (a hybrid subset between Mars Attacks and Wacky Packages with 13 cards; the last three cards in this subset were titled "Attacky Packages Old School" (similar to "Dinosaurs Attack! vs. Mars Attacks", this one was only available as a foil card set)) and "Mars Attacks/Judge Dredd" (with 18 cards)) was funded by Topps on Kickstarter in 2015 and released in 2016.

In 2017, to commemorate the franchise's 55th anniversary, Topps released an official sequel series to the original 1962 55-card series called Mars Attacks: The Revenge!, which takes place five years after the events in the original series and chronicles a second invasion of Earth by the surviving Martians that were off-world and on Earth during the destruction of Mars. It contained 110 cards - the story itself (cards #1–55) and rough pencil art for the story cards (cards #P-1–P-55). No subsets were made for this series. It was sold as a complete box set that contained only the unwrapped 110 cards.

A third series of trading cards, Mars Attacks: Uprising, was released in 2020 exclusively through a second Kickstarter campaign, with cards sent to those who donated to the campaign. Multiple artists were tapped to create a base set of 81 cards and 11 subsets, which generally depict counterattacking humans beginning to turn the tide against the Martian invasion.

=== Comic books ===
In 1988, a four-issue comic book miniseries titled Mars Attacks Mini Comics was published by Pocket Comics. Fifty-four issues were planned, but the series was cancelled after said four issues were released. Issues #5 and 6 were announced, but they were never published.

Starting in 1994 Topps Comics, initially in conjunction with the Mars Attacks Archives trading card series, issued a five-issue comic book miniseries based on the original 55 cards written by Keith Giffen and drawn by Charles Adlard. Topps Comics continued the story in an ongoing series that lasted seven issues, a one-shot titled Mars Attacks Baseball Special #1 (June 1996) and another miniseries titled Mars Attacks High School #1–2 (May and September 1997). Wizard magazine and Topps Comics also published a #1/2 issue and an Ace Edition issue (#65). A graphic novel titled Mars Attacks Graphic Album (1994) collected the original five-issue miniseries (but did not collect any of the five issues' back-up stories) along with an original short story, 1962-The Untold Tales: God Save the Queen!.

To tie in with the release of the film Mars Attacks! in 1996, two comic book intercompany crossovers with Image Comics continued the Topps Comics run, with the first one titled Mars Attacks The Savage Dragon #1–4 (December 1996 – March 1997) and the second one titled Mars Attacks Image #1–4 (December 1996 – April 1997), both of which depicted the Martians battling the Image Comics superhero the Savage Dragon and other characters from the wider Image Universe, respectively. The Savage Dragon (vol. 2) #37 (April 1997) was connected to the two miniseries as well, with both of the two miniseries' events and both of their aftermaths being heavily referenced in later storylines of The Savage Dragon (vol. 2).

IDW Publishing's line of Mars Attacks comic books included a 10-issue ongoing series, a crossover miniseries titled Mars Attacks Judge Dredd #1–4 (September–December 2013), and two miniseries titled Mars Attacks: First Born #1–4 (May–August 2014), and Mars Attacks: Occupation #1–5 (March–July 2016). There was also a weekly event in January 2013 titled Mars Attacks IDW (similar to IDW's previous Infestation events), which consisted of one-shots in which the Martians invaded the worlds of Popeye, Kiss, The Real Ghostbusters, The Transformers and Zombies vs. Robots, in that order. IDW also published two one-shots, Mars Attacks the Holidays (October 2012) and Mars Attacks: Classics Obliterated #1 (June 2013), both of which were collected in the graphic novel Mars Attacks: The Human Condition (2013). In addition to releasing collected editions of its own Mars Attacks comic books, IDW also collected Topps's Mars Attacks comic books from the 1990s in its Mars Attacks Classics series of graphic novels, which lasted three volumes and reprinted the entire Topps Comics run except for Mars Attacks Image #1–4 and The Savage Dragon (vol. 2) #37.

Around 2018, Dynamite Entertainment acquired the license to publish Mars Attacks comic books. Dynamite went on to publish a five-issue Mars Attacks miniseries, a crossover miniseries featuring John Carter of Mars and titled Warlord of Mars Attacks #1–5 (June–October 2019), and a series of two more crossover miniseries featuring Red Sonja, the first one titled Mars Attacks/Red Sonja #1–5 (August–December 2020) and the second one titled Red Sonja Attacks Mars #1–4 (March and June – August 2025).

== Bibliography ==
- Stewart, Bhob, Bill Pearson, Roger Hill, Greg Sadowski and Wallace Wood (2003). Against the Grain: MAD Artist Wallace Wood. TwoMorrows Publishing. ISBN 1-893905-23-3

== See also ==
- Mars Attacks Judge Dredd
- Mars in fiction
- Dinosaurs Attack!
- The War of the Worlds
