= King of the Congo =

1952 film by Wallace Grissell, Spencer Gordon Bennet

- Theatrical release insert poster
- Directed by: Spencer Gordon Bennet; Wallace Grissell
- Written by: Royal K. Cole; Arthur Hoerl; George H. Plympton
- Produced by: Sam Katzman
- Starring: Buster Crabbe; Gloria Dea; Leonard Penn; Jack Ingram; Rick Vallin; Nick Stuart; William Fawcett; Rusty Wescoatt
- Cinematography: William Whitley
- Edited by: Earl Turner
- Music by: Mischa Bakaleinikoff
- Color process: Black and white
- Distributed by: Columbia Pictures
- Release date: May 1, 1952
- Running time: 252 minutes
- Country: United States
- Language: English

King of the Congo is a 1952 American 15 chapter movie serial, the 48th released by Columbia Pictures. It was produced by Sam Katzman, directed by Spencer Gordon Bennet and Wallace Grissell, and stars Buster Crabbe. The serial also co-stars Gloria Dea, Leonard Penn, Jack Ingram, Rick Vallin, Nick Stuart, William Fawcett, and Rusty Wescoatt. King of the Congo was based on the comic book character "Thun'da", created by Frank Frazetta, and published by Magazine Enterprises.

King of the Congo centers around a U.S. Air Force captain and his quest to find missing microfilm containing information vital to the United States government. His journey takes him across the Atlantic all the way to a jungle in Africa.

== Plot ==
Captain Roger Drum (Buster Crabbe) shoots down an enemy plane carrying microfilm while on its way to Africa to deliver it to an enemy of America. Intent on revealing this subversive group for whom the microfilm's message is intended, Drum assumes the enemy pilot's identity. He flies his twin-engine aircraft across the Atlantic, where he is forced to crash it in a remote African jungle. Drum is rescued by the all- female Rock People, led by Princess Pha. He is renamed Thunda, King of the Congo, after he repeatedly rings a temple gong using a large stone mallet, sounding the alarm to an attack by the primitive, all-male Cave Men. With the subversives believing Thunda is their missing pilot, and with the Rock People under constant attack from the Cave Men, Captain Drum plots to bring down the subversives who are searching for a new metal more radioactive and powerful than Uranium. At the serial's conclusion, Thunda (Drum) clears the jungle of America's enemy and is able to reunite, as one tribe, the all-female Rock People and all-male Cave Men.

== Cast ==
- Buster Crabbe as Thunda/Capt. Roger Drum
- Gloria Dea as Princess Pha
- Leonard Penn as Boris
- Jack Ingram as Clark
- Rick Vallin as Andreov
- Nick Stuart as Degar
- William Fawcett as High Priest
- Rusty Wescoatt as Kor
- Alex Montoya as Lipah
- Frank Ellis as Ivan
- Lee Roberts as Lt. Blake
- Neyle Morrow as Nahee

== Chapter titles ==
1. Mission of Menace
2. Red Shadows in the Jungle
3. Into the Valley of Mist
4. Thunda Meets His Match
5. Thunda Turns the Tables
6. Thunda's Desperate Charge
7. Thunda Trapped
8. Mission of Evil
9. Menace of the Magnetic Rocks
10. Lair of the Leopard
11. An Ally from the Sky
12. Riding Wild
13. Red Raiders
14. Savage Vengeance
15. Judgment of the Jungle

_{Source:}

== Production ==
King of the Congo was both the last Tarzan-style serial made and last serial to star Buster Crabbe. Crabbe starred in nine serials between 1933 and 1952:

- Tarzan the Fearless (1933) as Tarzan
- Flash Gordon (1936) as Flash Gordon
- Flash Gordon's Trip to Mars (1938) as Flash Gordon
- Red Barry (1938) as Red Barry
- Buck Rogers (1939) as Buck Rogers
- Flash Gordon Conquers the Universe (1940) as Flash Gordon
- The Sea Hound (1947) as Captain Silver
- Pirates of the High Seas (1950) as Jeff Drake
- King of the Congo (1952) as Captain Roger Drum and "Thunda"

== Filming locations ==
- Iverson Movie Ranch, Chatsworth, Los Angeles.

== See also ==
- List of film serials by year
- List of film serials by studio

Preceded by Captain Video: Master of the Stratosphere (1951)	Columbia Serial; King of the Congo (1952)	Succeeded by Blackhawk (1952)
