= Cave Girl (comics) =

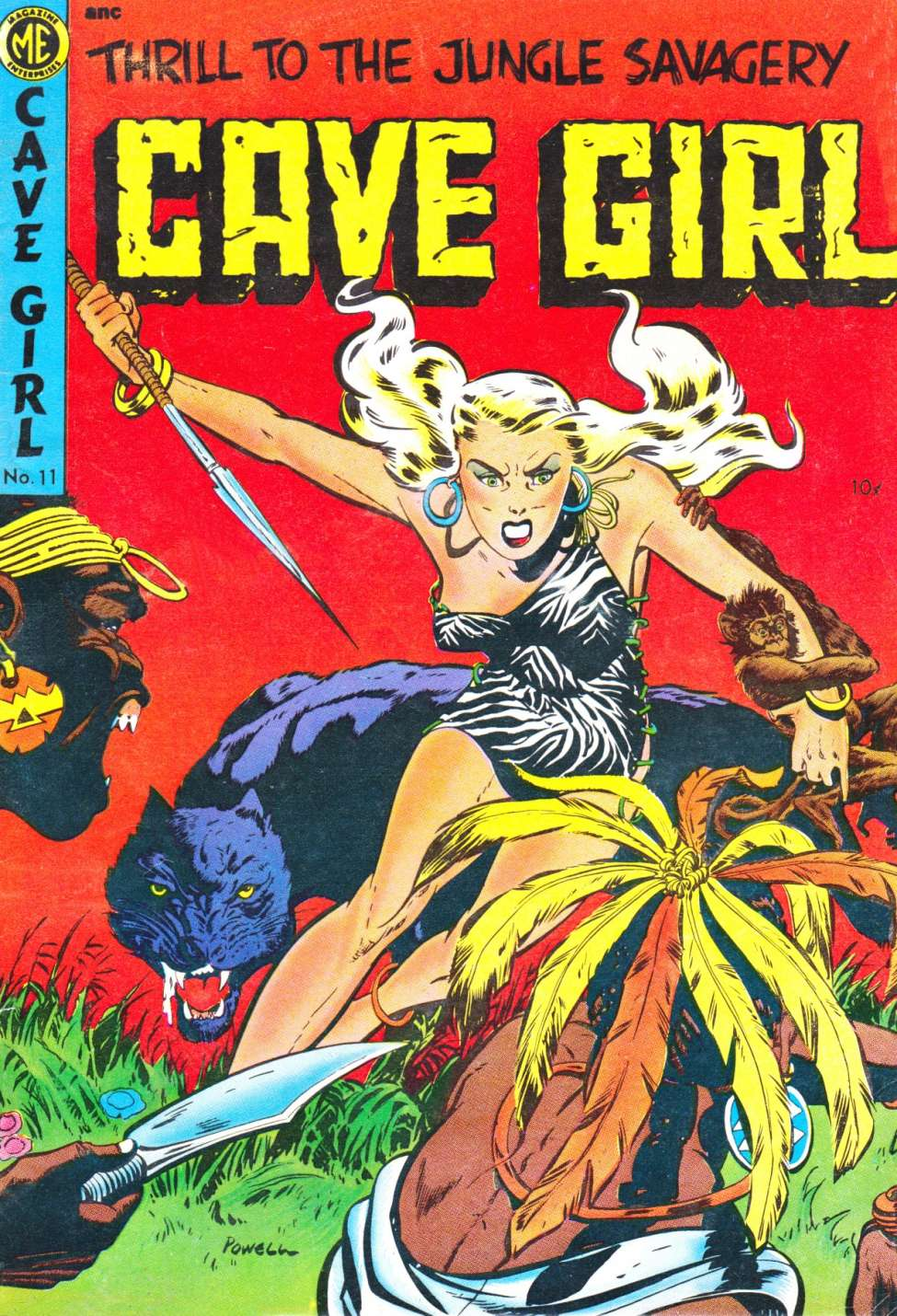
- Cave Girl #11, a.k.a. A-1 #82 (1953, no date). Cover art by Bob Powell

Publication information
- Publisher: Magazine Enterprises
- First appearance: Thun'da #2 (1952)
- Created by: Gardner Fox (writer); Bob Powell (artist)

In-story information
- Full name: Carol Mantomer

Cave Girl is a fictional jungle girl heroine who appeared in comic books published by Magazine Enterprises from 1952 to 1955, created by writer Gardner Fox and artist Bob Powell. The character's adventures are an example of artist Powell's good girl art.

== Publication history ==
Cave Girl debuted in her own feature in Thun'da #2 (1952, no cover date), in the seven-page story "The Ape God of Kor" by writer Gardner Fox and artist Bob Powell and guest-starring the jungle man Thun'da.

After again appearing in her own feature the following issue, she spun off into her own quarterly comic, Cave Girl #11-14 (1953–54), which like Thun'da was part of the publisher's rotating anthology A-1; her four issues are also known, respectively, as A-1 #82, #96, #116, and #125. Thun'da starred in a backup feature. Cave Girl continued to star in a backup feature in Thun'da through issue #6. She also headlined the single-issue Magazine Enterprises comic Africa (1955) (A-1 Comics #137). All stories were by Fox and Powell.

In 1988, AC Comics published a single issue reprinting three Cave Girl stories in black-and-white with graytones, accompanied by a 10-page historical article about the character and Powell.

An unrelated character appeared in a single-issue, black-and-white independent comic book of jungle erotica, Burcham Studio / Comax Productions' Cave Girl (1991, no date), written and drawn by Butch Burcham.

== Fictional character biography ==
Following the jungle deaths of her parents, Edward and Betty Mantomer, young Carol Mantomer is rescued by an eagle who flies her into the Dawn Lands, where prehistoric creatures dwell. There the wolf Kattu raises her. She grows into the blond beauty adept at primitive weapons, who protects her jungle home against ivory poachers, headhunters, the Mau Mau, mythological Amazon women and others. She developed a romantic relationship with white hunter Luke Hardin.

== Legacy ==
Cave Girl's adventures are considered an example of artist Powell's good girl art. As one historian wrote, "[O]ne of the great Golden Age depicters of sexy girls was Bob Powell — and one of his most memorable creations was Cave Girl...."
