= Dinosaurs Attack! =

Trading card series

- One of the three versions of the wrappers for the series
- Type: Trading card
- Company: Topps
- Country: United States
- Availability: 1988–1988
- Features: Dinosaurs

Dinosaurs Attack! is a trading card series that was produced by Topps and released in 1988, containing 55 base cards and 11 sticker cards. The cards tell the story of dinosaurs transported through time into the present day through a freak accident and wreaking havoc on Earth. The series is notable for its graphic violence and gore, which was intended to evoke memories of the successful 1962 trading card series Mars Attacks.

== Overview ==
The 1988 trading card series Dinosaurs Attack! was created as a follow-up to the successful 1962 trading card series Mars Attacks. Like Mars Attacks, Dinosaurs Attack! was intended to be an homage to, and a parody of, 1950s B movies. While Mars Attacks was a parody of alien invasion films, Dinosaurs Attack! was a parody of monster on the loose films, especially the two films that started the genre, The Beast from 20,000 Fathoms (1953) and Godzilla (1954).

Topps veteran product developers Art Spiegelman, Len Brown (who had designed and written Mars Attacks) and Gary Gerani developed the idea for the series. It was Gerani's original suggestion, and he received one "created-by" credit in later Topps-licensed comic books and an accompanying trade paperback based on the cards. Gerani sketched out the 55-card storyboards, wrote the copy for the card backs, and directed the artwork for all of the cards. Herb Trimpe adapted Gerani's storyboards into pencils, with some assistance from John Nemec and George Evans. Then, Earl Norem and XNO delivered the final paintings. Paul Mavrides and Harry S. Robins of the Church of the SubGenius did the artwork for the 11 stickers.

The storyline of the 55 base cards is minimal. They tell the story of a scientific time travel experiment gone horribly wrong, transporting several dinosaurs, pterosaurs, marine reptiles and other prehistoric animals of many kinds from their various prehistoric time periods into modern times, where they wreak havoc on mankind. Most of the cards show a different scene of the dinosaurs causing chaos and death across the world. Some of the cards show the scientists frantically working to reverse the time travel effect. In the end, the Supreme Monstrosity, the patron deity of the dinosaurs (nicknamed "Dinosaur Satan" by some fans due to its resemblance to the popular culture depiction of Satan) intervenes, trying to stop the scientists. The lead scientist, Elias Thorne, sacrifices himself to the Supreme Monstrosity so his wife, Helen, can succeed and forcefully send the dinosaurs back to their own time, tearing them apart in the process. The artwork is intended to be shocking and graphically bloody, with one card showing schoolchildren being eaten by an Allosaurus, a Stegosaurus eating a police officer while its spiked tail gouges out the eye of another police officer and a Pteranodon tearing apart the President of the United States. The cards also contain gross inaccuracies in their depiction of dinosaurs; for instance, in one card, trilobites are portrayed as "flesh-eating worms" that attack humans. In reality, trilobites consumed mud for nutrients. Also, a Dimetrodon is depicted as dwarfing Saint Basil's Cathedral, several herbivores are depicted as flesh-eaters and other various dinosaurs are depicted as being almost kaiju-like. In fact, one can see references to the films Gorgo (1961) and Reptilicus (1961), and two science fictional dinosaurs, the Rhedosaurus from the film The Beast from 20,000 Fathoms (1953) and the Paleosaurus from the film The Giant Behemoth (1959), are among the depicted creatures. Trachodon is the exception; it is correctly portrayed as a plant-eater and is never seen directly causing any deaths (it does, however, indirectly cause one death when startling one man on a duck hunting trip so badly that he accidentally shoots his friend who is with him on the trip). Additionally, it is the only one on the 11 stickers that is shown not killing a human (instead, it is trying to eat a street light).

Despite Topps' hopes, Dinosaurs Attack! did not achieve commercial success. Tim Burton was going to make a film based on the cards in 1993, but decided not to do so after Jurassic Park was released in the same year. Instead, he made the film Mars Attacks! (1996).

In 2016, Topps and Kickstarter released Mars Attacks: Occupation, an all-new trading card series that contained six different subsets. One of these was a nine-card subset titled "Dinosaurs Attack! vs. Mars Attacks". This was the first time that the two famous trading card series' storylines have been combined into one.

In 2019, the cards were discussed on four episodes of the popular podcast Hello Internet by hosts CGP Grey and Dr. Brady Haran.

In 2021, Topps and Kickstarter released Mars Attacks: Uprising, another all-new trading card series that contained 11 different subsets. One of these was another nine-card subset titled both "Mars & Dinosaurs Attack" (on the pack wrapper that contained the subset) and "Mars & Dinosaurs Attack History" (on the card backs). This subset was the sequel to the previous one from Mars Attacks: Occupation. Also released as part of this series were two one-shot cards titled "Mars & Dinosaurs in Hell" and "Mars and Dinosaurs Attack Fantastic Realms". These two cards each seem to have been the beginnings of two other subsets that have both never gone beyond that point as of this date, nor is it known if they ever will.

== Comic book adaptation ==
Eclipse Comics' Dinosaurs Attack! #1 (January 1991)

In 1991 Eclipse Comics began releasing a three-issue miniseries based on the cards. However, due to the original poor performance of the cards and problems within Eclipse Comics, they ended up only publishing the first issue. This issue also included four Dinosaurs Attack! bonus cards on the back cover that could be cut out of it. These bonus cards had never been seen before and have not been reprinted ever since. Both the appearance and the contents of the planned second and third issues of this miniseries are unknown.

In July 2013, IDW Publishing reprinted the one issue of the Eclipse Comics miniseries and finished the story as part of the cards' 25th anniversary. While the original Eclipse miniseries was only going to be three issues, IDW expanded it to five issues. In February 2014, the entire miniseries was reprinted as a trade paperback. It reunited writer Gary Gerani, penciler Herb Trimpe and painter Earl Norem from the cards.

== Characters ==
Throughout the cards, a small number of recurring characters were present, usually appearing either as a name or as a picture on a few of them.

- Elias Thorne – One of the head scientists on the TimeScanner project, he and his wife, Helen, were (presumably) the last humans left on the space station Prometheus. While attempting to reverse the TimeScanner's ability to materialize dinosaurs on Earth, they were attacked by a large demonic dinosaur. Thorne sacrificed himself to the beast, giving his wife time to start the reverse process on the TimeScanner, forcefully sending the dinosaurs back to their own time and tearing them apart in the process.
- Helen Thorne – Elias Thorne's wife, she helped him build a mechanism to reverse the TimeScanner's effects. However, a large demonic dinosaur attacked and killed Elias. Helen was able to throw the switch to the mechanism, triggering the reversal of the TimeScanner, forcefully sending the dinosaurs back to their own time and tearing them apart in the process. Helen narrates the back of the final story card, telling that how she and Elias only wanted to know what killed the dinosaurs. She concludes that the reason that the dinosaurs became extinct was because of us.
- The Anchorman – This unnamed anchorman appeared on the back of several cards, interviewing attack survivors. He first appeared interviewing a group of rock stars who were attacked by a group of dinosaurs who ate their colorful hair. He later interviewed a man who accidentally shot his friend while they were hunting ducks after being startled by a grazing Trachodon. The anchorman is later killed on another card when a dinosaur invades the newsroom and eats him, while his assistant runs away. Throughout his earliest appearances, the anchorman seemed skeptical of the events.
- Mitchell Stevens – A Lt. Colonel in the U.S. Army, he is never actually seen on any of the cards. Rather, he is mentioned on the backs of all of the cards that look like a report being addressed to the military, with Stevens being the sender.
- General Frank Manchester – General Frank Manchester was put in charge of U.S. Army operations after the death of the previous commander, who is ripped in two by a pair of dinosaurs (according to the front of the card in which Manchester first appears). While Manchester is only mentioned on the back of one card, he is later seen on another card crushed by a theropod, his entrails scattered all over the ground around him. It is confirmed that this is him by Mitchell Stevens' report on the other side of the card.
- The Saurian – An evolved, benevolent dinosauroid who appears to Elias in a dream. Despite appearing only once, the Saurian is an important character in the cards; he explains that the patron deity of the dinosaurs is the one whom Elias saw through the TimeScanner three weeks before and that he will not rest until they have flooded over into the present. The Saurian further elaborates that human beings possess souls—the ability to judge what is right and wrong—while the dinosaurs do not. This is the cause of their ferocious, mindless savagery.
- The Supreme Monstrosity – The patron deity of the dinosaurs and the main antagonist. He is a devil-like dinosaur who was brought through the TimeScanner by Elias and Helen, after which he then decided that the dinosaurs should rule the present and set them upon the human race. He was eventually killed when Elias sacrificed himself so that Helen could reverse the TimeScanner in order to kill both him and the dinosaurs.

== Cancelled film adaptation ==
Shortly after the release of the cards, creator Gary Gerani took a proposed film treatment for Dinosaurs Attack! to Joe Dante and Michael Finnell who optioned the property for development. Dante and Finnell rejected Gerani's initial treatment and began developing their own with Charles S. Haas writing the screenplay, while Will Vinton was being eyed to direct. After the release of Jurassic Park Dante and Finnell lost faith in the project, believing they would not be able to meet audience expectations. Dante and Finnell briefly considered an alternate path for the project by retooling it as a parody of the recent glut of Jurassic Park and other dinosaur films, but this film was also never made.
