= Mars Attacks Judge Dredd =

2013 comic book miniseries

- Publisher: IDW Publishing
- Publication date: September – December 2013

Creative team
- Writer: Al Ewing
- Artist: John McCrea
- Colorist: Jay Fotos

Mars Attacks Judge Dredd is a four-issue intercompany crossover between Judge Dredd and Mars Attacks!; IDW Publishing had the license to make original North American comics of both properties. Al Ewing was a regular on 2000 AD at the time and McCrea was IDW's main artist on Mars Attacks!.

While all previous Judge Dredd crossovers have been in continuity with 2000 AD's Dredd strip, Al Ewing has stated that Mars Attacks Judge Dredd takes place in IDW's Dredd continuity: "I tend to think of it as 'Ultimate Dredd,' which means that I can reach into the toybox and pull out elements that have been used in "2000 AD" and use them a little differently." This meant he could write a younger, "meaner" Dredd than he did in 2000 AD. At this point in time, the Manta Tank is still a classified prototype, East-Meg One is still intact, and Dredd and Anderson have worked together.

== Production ==
IDW had run a series of Mars Attacks! variant covers on their titles to promote a January 2013 crossover, one of which was their Judge Dredd ongoing: one of the Martians being menaced by Dredd, drawn by Greg Staples. Fans were excited by the image and both IDW and Rebellion Publishing also enjoyed it, leading to discussions about doing a real crossover; 2000 AD editor Matt Smith publicly said that a crossover would be "great fun" in January 2013. The companies quickly came to an agreement and the comic was announced in April 2013. Al Ewing was asked to write it as IDW's editors enjoyed his Zaucer of Zilk comic.

IDW's Mars Attacks! comic inserted pictures of (fake) Mars Attacks! trading cards into the strip, emphasising a particular plot twist or Martian attack. The same thing is done in this miniseries, but the cards are instead Judge Pal cards – the kid-friendly mascot used by the Judges to get children to inform on their parents – and used for exposition and world-building; for example, a "Rumble In The Pit!" card appears during a Sector 301 riot, saying the Judges' response to the riot is "putting the lie to scurrilous rumours of massive judicial corruption in Sector 301 – aka 'The Pit'! DON'T LISTEN – IT'S SEDITION! Dial P-A-L and report criminal propaganda to Judge Pal for a possible cash reward!"
