= Mars Attacks! =

1996 American film by Tim Burton

- Theatrical release poster
- Directed by: Tim Burton
- Written by: Jonathan Gems
- Based on: Mars Attacks by Topps
- Produced by: Tim Burton; Larry J. Franco
- Starring: Jack Nicholson; Glenn Close; Annette Bening; Pierce Brosnan; Danny DeVito; Martin Short; Sarah Jessica Parker; Michael J. Fox; Rod Steiger; Tom Jones; Lukas Haas; Natalie Portman; Jim Brown; Lisa Marie; Sylvia Sidney
- Cinematography: Peter Suschitzky
- Edited by: Chris Lebenzon
- Music by: Danny Elfman
- Production companies: Warner Bros.; Tim Burton Productions
- Distributed by: Warner Bros.
- Release date: December 13, 1996 (United States)
- Running time: 106 minutes
- Country: United States
- Language: English
- Budget: $80–100 million
- Box office: $101.4 million

Mars Attacks! is a 1996 American science fiction black comedy film directed by Tim Burton, who also co-produced it with Larry J. Franco. The screenplay by Jonathan Gems was based on the Topps trading card series of the same name. The film features an ensemble cast consisting of Jack Nicholson (in a dual role), Glenn Close, Annette Bening, Pierce Brosnan, Danny DeVito, Martin Short, Sarah Jessica Parker, Michael J. Fox, Rod Steiger, Tom Jones, Lukas Haas, Natalie Portman, Jim Brown, Lisa Marie, and Sylvia Sidney in her final film role.

Alex Cox had tried to make a Mars Attacks film in the 1980s before Burton and Gems began development in 1993. When Gems turned in his first draft in 1994, Warner Bros. Pictures commissioned rewrites from Gems, Burton, and Scott Alexander and Larry Karaszewski in an attempt to lower the budget to $60 million. The final production budget came to $80 million, while Warner Bros. spent another $20 million on the Mars Attacks! marketing campaign. Filming took place from February to June 1996. The film was shot in California, Nevada, Kansas, Arizona, and Argentina.

The filmmakers hired Industrial Light & Magic to create the Martians using computer animation after their previous plan to use stop motion supervised by Barry Purves fell through because of budget and time limitations. Mars Attacks! was released theatrically by Warner Bros. Pictures in the United States on December 13, 1996, to mixed reviews from critics, with praise for its comedic satire of 1950s sci-fi B movies, but criticisms for its dark humor. The film grossed approximately $101.4 million in box-office totals, which was seen as a flop. Mars Attacks! was nominated for the Hugo Award for Best Dramatic Presentation and earned multiple nominations at the Saturn Awards. It has achieved cult classic status over the years. Due to his advancing Parkinson's and except for brief cameos and appearances in documentary films, this would be the final live action film for Fox as he would focus mainly on voiceover work.

== Plot ==
On the planet Mars, a Martian spaceship gathers hundreds of other ships and travels to Earth. U.S. President James Dale, along with his aides, addresses the United States concerning this historic event. Several days later, the President's science aides set up a first-contact meeting with the Martians in Pahrump, Nevada, as Dale watches the development on television with his wife Marsha and his daughter Taffy. Using a translation machine, the Martian ambassador announces that his race has "come in peace". In response, a hippie releases a live dove as a symbol of peace, causing the ambassador to shoot it before ordering the other Martians to massacre most of the attendees at the event, including General Casey, news reporter Jason Stone, and young private Billy-Glenn Norris. Talk-show host Natalie Lake, who is Jason's co-worker and girlfriend, is captured by the Martians in the process, alongside her pet chihuahua, Poppy.

Thinking that the Martians assumed that the dove was a symbol of war, Dale tells Professor Donald Kessler to renegotiate with the Martians, whose ambassador later requests to address the United States Congress. At this meeting, the Martians annihilate most of Congress and, despite begging the ambassador to stop, Kessler is knocked unconscious and taken aboard their ship. Kessler's head is disembodied and animated as part of the experiments by the Martians, who have also switched around Nathalie and Poppy's heads onto their bodies. Back on Earth, General Decker fails to persuade Dale to retaliate with nuclear warfare.

After a failed attempt to assassinate Dale using a disguised Martian, the Martians declare war and invade Earth in droves, starting with Washington, D.C., and quickly spreading around the globe. As they attack the White House, the U.S. Secret Service evacuates Dale, but Marsha is killed while Taffy is separated during the chaos. After the president of France is assassinated by the Martians that night, the U.S. government attempts a nuclear attack on the Martian mothership, but that proves futile. Eventually, two Martians, led by their leader, breach the bunker where Dale has been taken, and kill Decker and everyone else in the bunker except for Dale, who makes an impassioned speech in an attempt to plead for peace. The Martian leader seemingly agrees to a truce with Dale, but then uses a gadget disguised as a hand to assassinate him.

As the Martians ravage Las Vegas, Byron Williams, a former world-champion boxer turned casino employee, leads a small group of survivors consisting of Barbara Land, singer Tom Jones, and Byron's waitress co-worker Cindy to escape the city in a small turboprop plane. As soon as they enter the plane, the group discover a large platoon of Martians (along with the ambassador) stationed there, as they are preparing to take off. Byron creates a diversion by challenging the Martians to a fistfight. While he succeeds in killing the ambassador, Byron is outnumbered and overwhelmed by the other Martians, but Jones, Barbara, and Cindy escape.

While going to rescue his grandmother Florence, Billy-Glenn's brother Richie discovers the Martians' weakness: Slim Whitman's "Indian Love Call". Richie and Florence then drive around town, using the song to kill Martians and broadcast the song on a local radio station. Thereafter, armed forces broadcast the song around the globe, killing the Martian leader and most, if not all, of the other Martians. Nathalie and Kessler's disembodied heads accept their fate as the Martian mothership they are on crashes into the ocean.

In the aftermath, Barbara, Cindy, and Jones emerge from a cave with some wild animals to see dozens of crashed Martian ships in Lake Tahoe. Taffy awards Richie and Florence the Medal of Honor. Byron, who survived the Martian brawl, arrives in Washington, D.C., to reunite with his former wife Louise and their two sons Cedric and Neville, as the devastation is being cleaned up.

== Cast ==
- Jack Nicholson as
  - James Dale, the President of the United States
  - Art Land, the owner of Galaxy Casino in Las Vegas
- Glenn Close as First Lady Marsha Dale, James's wife
- Annette Bening as Barbara Land, Art's wife
- Pierce Brosnan as Professor Donald Kessler
- Lukas Haas as Richie Norris
- Sarah Jessica Parker as Nathalie Lake, Donald's love interest and talk show presenter
- Martin Short as White House Press Secretary Jerry Ross
- Michael J. Fox as Jason Stone, Nathalie's boyfriend and a news reporter
- Rod Steiger as General Decker
- Tom Jones as himself
- Natalie Portman as First Daughter Taffy Dale, James and Marsha's daughter and Richie's love interest
- Jim Brown as Byron Williams, a retired boxer
- Danny DeVito as Joe Weinberg, a rude gambler who frequents Galaxy Casino
- Lisa Marie as a Martian girl
- Sylvia Sidney as Florence Norris, Richie's paternal grandmother

The cast also includes Joe Don Baker and O-Lan Jones as Richie's parents Glenn Norris and Sue-Ann Norris, and Jack Black as his older brother Billy-Glenn Norris. Christina Applegate appears as Sharona, Billy-Glenn's girlfriend and trailer-park lover. Pam Grier plays Byron's former wife, Louise Williams, while Janice Rivera plays his assistant, Cindy, and Ray J and Brandon Hammond play his children, Cedric Williams and Neville Williams. Jerzy Skolimowski plays Doctor Zeigler, the developer of a Martian-language translator. John Roselius plays Stone's supervisor at GNN, while Michael Reilly Burke and Valerie Wildman play fellow reporters. Steve Valentine plays the television director for Nathalie's talk show. Paul Winfield and Enrique Castillo, respectively, play General Casey and the Hispanic colonel who greet the aliens in Nevada. Brian Haley plays Mitch, one of the President's Secret Service agents. Frank Welker voices the Martians.

== Production ==
=== Development ===
In 1985, Alex Cox pitched the idea of a film based on the Mars Attacks trading-card series as a joint production to Orion and TriStar Pictures. He wrote three drafts over the next four years, but was replaced by Martin Amis before Orion and TriStar placed Mars Attacks! in turnaround.

In 1993, Jonathan Gems, a screenwriter who had previously written multiple unproduced screenplays for director Tim Burton, approached the director and pitched the idea of turning both Mars Attacks and Dinosaurs Attack! into films. While both Gems and Burton realized that a Dinosaurs Attack! film would be too similar to Steven Spielberg's Jurassic Park (1993), Burton believed that a Mars Attacks! adaptation could function like a 1970s disaster picture with an ensemble cast; he and Gems consequently rented a copy of the film The Towering Inferno (1974) and watched it for inspiration. In a later interview, Gems explained: "After seeing that [movie] it all came to me fairly quickly. And, in about a week, I had it roughed out: the story and the characters. And when I finished it, I realized it was inevitably going to be – it couldn't help being – a portrait of America because, following the Irwin Allen formula, I'd sketched out a range of different characters from different walks of life and placed the action in different locations – in this case: California, Nevada, Kansas, New York, Mount Rushmore, and Washington, D.C."

Burton, who was busy preparing Ed Wood (1994), believed that Mars Attacks! would be a perfect opportunity to pay homage to the films of Edward D. Wood Jr., especially Plan 9 from Outer Space (1959), and other 1950s science-fiction B movies, such as Invaders from Mars (1953), It Came from Outer Space (1953), The War of the Worlds (1953), Target Earth (1954), Invasion of the Body Snatchers (1956), and Earth vs. the Flying Saucers (1956).

Burton set Mars Attacks! up with Warner Bros. and the studio purchased the film rights to the trading-card series on his behalf. The original theatrical release date was planned for the summer of 1996. Gems completed his original script in 1994, which was budgeted by Warner Bros. at $260 million. The studio wanted to make the film for no more than $60 million. After turning in numerous drafts, the studio grew frustrated with Gems after insisting he remove the film's cold open, specifically "the cows on fire"; they demanded there be no burning cows, but Gems contends he could not devise another sequence (albeit anything Burton and he could agree improved on his initial "barbecue bovines" prologue). When Gems' latest script revision still included burning cows, the studio dismissed him; prior to leaving the project, Gems recommended the writing duo behind Ed Wood, Scott Alexander and Larry Karaszewski, as his replacement(s). Alexander and Karaszewski worked on the film through July 1995, focusing the characters and making the tone less satirical – they rewrote the third act, incorporating the military and a finale that mirrored Independence Day (1996), according to Gems.

Gems eventually returned to the project, writing a total of 12 drafts of the script (well over 90% of the finished shooting script). Although he is credited with both the screen story and screenplay of Mars Attacks!, Gems dedicates his novelization of the movie to Burton, who "co-wrote the screenplay and didn't ask for a credit". Warner Bros. was dubious of the Martian dialogue and wanted Burton to add subtitles, but he resisted. Working with Burton, Gems pared the film's 60 leading characters down to 23 and the worldwide destruction planned for the film was isolated to three major cities. Scenes featuring Martians attacking China, the Philippines, Japan, Europe, Africa, India, and Russia were deleted from the screenplay, leaving only Paris, London, and the Taj Mahal. "Bear in mind, this was way before Independence Day (1996) was written," Gems commented. "We had things like Manhattan being destroyed building by building, the White House went and so did the Empire State Building. Warner Bros. figured all this would be too expensive, so we cut most of that out to reduce the cost." Further discussing the differences between Mars Attacks! and Independence Day, Gems stated, "Independence Day is more like a movie called Fail Safe and Mars Attacks! is like Dr. Strangelove", in that both films had a similar story, but with different tones.

=== Casting ===
The decision to hire an A-list ensemble cast for Mars Attacks! parallels the strategy Irwin Allen used for his disaster films, notably The Poseidon Adventure (1972) and The Towering Inferno (1974). Jack Nicholson, approached for the role of the President, jokingly remarked that he wanted to play all the roles. Burton agreed to cast Nicholson as both Art Land and President Dale, specifically remembering his positive working relationship with the actor on Batman.

Susan Sarandon was originally set to play Barbara Land before Annette Bening was cast. Bening modeled the character after Ann-Margret's performance in Viva Las Vegas (1964). Hugh Grant was the first choice for Professor Donald Kessler, a role which eventually went to Pierce Brosnan. Meryl Streep, Diane Keaton and Stockard Channing were considered for First Lady Marsha Dale, but Glenn Close won the role. In addition to Nicholson, other actors who reunited with Burton on Mars Attacks! include Sylvia Sidney from Beetlejuice (1988), O-Lan Jones from Edward Scissorhands (1990), and Danny DeVito from Batman Returns (1992), continuing Burton's trend of recasting actors several times from his previous works.

Roger L. Jackson, best known as the voice of Ghostface in the Scream film franchise, makes an uncredited appearance as the voice of the Martian translator device. His performance in Mars Attacks! helped him get the audition for Scream.

=== Filming ===
The originally scheduled start date was mid-August 1995, but filming was delayed until that fall. Director Tim Burton hired Peter Suschitzky as the cinematographer because he was a fan of his work in David Cronenberg's films. Production designer Wynn Thomas (A Beautiful Mind, Malcolm X) intended to have the war room pay tribute to Dr. Strangelove (1964). During production, Burton insisted that the art direction, cinematography, and costume design of Mars Attacks! incorporate the look of the 1960s trading cards.

On designing the Martian (played by Burton's girlfriend Lisa Marie Smith) who seduces and kills Jerry Ross (Martin Short), costume designer Colleen Atwood took combined inspiration from the playing cards, Marilyn Monroe, the work of Alberto Vargas, and Jane Fonda in Barbarella (1968). Filming for Mars Attacks! ended on June 1, 1996. The film score was composed by Burton's regular composer Danny Elfman, to whom Burton was reconciled after a quarrel that occurred during The Nightmare Before Christmas (1993), for which they did not co-operate in producing Ed Wood (1994). Elfman enlisted the help of Oingo Boingo lead guitarist Steve Bartek to help arrange the compositions for the orchestra.

=== Visual effects ===
The Martians were created using computer-generated imagery from Industrial Light & Magic.

Tim Burton initially intended to use stop-motion animation to feature the Martians, viewing it as an homage to the work of Ray Harryhausen, primarily Jason and the Argonauts. Similar to his own Beetlejuice, Burton "wanted to make [the special effects] look cheap and purposely fake-looking as possible." He first approached Henry Selick, director of The Nightmare Before Christmas, to supervise the stop-motion work, but Selick was busy directing James and the Giant Peach, also produced by Burton. Even though Warner Bros. was skeptical of the escalating budget and had not yet greenlit the film for production, Burton hired Barry Purves to shepherd the stop-motion work. Purves created an international team of about 70 animators, who worked on Mars Attacks! for eight months and began compiling test footage in Burbank, California. The department workers studied Gloria Swanson's choreography and movement as Norma Desmond in Sunset Boulevard for inspiration on the Martians' movement.

When the budget was projected at $100 million (Warner Bros. wanted it for no more than $75 million), producer Larry J. Franco commissioned a test reel from Industrial Light & Magic, the visual effects company he worked with on Jumanji. Burton was persuaded to change his mind to employ computer animation, which brought the final production budget to $80 million. Although Purves was uncredited for his work, stop-motion supervisors Ian Mackinnon and Peter Saunders, who would later collaborate with Burton on Corpse Bride, received character design credit. Warner Digital Studios was responsible for the scenes of global destruction, airborne flying saucer sequences, the Martian landing in Nevada and the robot that pursues Richie Norris in his pickup truck. Warner Digital also used practical effects, such as building scale models of Big Ben and other landmarks. The destruction of Art Land's hotel was footage of the real-life nighttime demolition of the Landmark Hotel and Casino, a building Burton wished to immortalize.

== Soundtrack ==
Mars Attacks!

Soundtrack album by Danny Elfman
- Released: March 4, 1997
- Recorded: 1996
- Genre: Soundtrack
- Length: 46:44
- Label: Atlantic Records
- Producer: Danny Elfman

Danny Elfman chronology
Extreme Measures (1996)	Mars Attacks! (1997)	Men in Black (1997)

The film's music was composed and produced by Danny Elfman, conducted by Artie Kane and performed by the Hollywood Studio Symphony. The soundtrack was released on March 4, 1997, by Atlantic Records.

All music is composed by Danny Elfman (except "Indian Love Call", written by Otto A. Harbach, Oscar Hammerstein II and Rudolf Friml, performed by Slim Whitman and "It's Not Unusual", written by Les Reed and Gordon Mills, performed by Tom Jones).

Track listing
No.	Title	Length
1.	"Introduction"	1:40
2.	"Main Titles"	2:22
3.	"First Sighting"	1:26
4.	"The Landing"	6:01
5.	"Ungodly Experiments"	0:53
6.	"State Address"	3:06
7.	"Martian Madame"	3:02
8.	"Martian Lounge"	2:54
9.	"Return Message"	2:17
10.	"Destructo X"	1:17
11.	"Loving Heads"	1:20
12.	"Pursuit"	2:55
13.	"The War Room"	1:31
14.	"Airfield Dilemma"	2:05
15.	"New World"	1:45
16.	"Ritchie's Speech"	3:09
17.	"End Credits"	3:53
18.	"Indian Love Call"	3:08
19.	"It's Not Unusual"	2:00
Total length:		46:44

== Reception ==
=== Release and box office ===
The film was originally set for release in August of 1996. But due to production delays it was pushed back to December.

Warner Bros. spent $20 million on the movie's marketing campaign; together with $80 million spent during production, the final combined budget came to $100 million. A novelization, written by screenwriter Jonathan Gems, was published by Puffin Books in January 1997. The film was released in the United States on December 13, 1996, earning $9.38 million in its opening weekend and ranking in second place at the box office below Jerry Maguire. Mars Attacks! eventually made $37.77 million in U.S. totals and $63.6 million elsewhere, coming to a worldwide total of $101.37 million.

The film was considered to be a box-office bomb in the U.S. but generally achieved greater success both critically and commercially in Europe. Many observers found similarities with Independence Day, which also came out in 1996. "It was just a coincidence. Nobody told me about it. I was surprised how close it was," director Tim Burton continued, "but then it's a pretty basic genre I guess. Independence Day was different in tone – it was different in everything. It almost seemed like we had done kind of a Mad magazine version of Independence Day." During the film's theatrical run in January 1997, TBS purchased the broadcasting rights of the film. However, over the years since its release, the film has become a cult classic from sci-fi fans of 50s sci-fi and has placed itself in pop culture as an iconic parody film.

=== Critical reception ===
The film received mixed responses from critics. On review aggregator Rotten Tomatoes, the film holds an approval rating of 57% based on 94 reviews. The website's critical consensus reads, "Tim Burton's Mars Attacks! faithfully recreates the wooden characters and schlocky story of cheesy '50s sci-fi and Ed Wood movies – perhaps a little too faithfully for audiences." On Metacritic, the film received a score of 52 based on 19 reviews, indicating "mixed or average reviews".

Roger Ebert observed the homages to the 1950s science fiction B movies: "Ed Wood himself could have told us what's wrong with this movie: the makers felt superior to the material. To be funny, even schlock has to believe in itself. Look for Infra-Man (1975) or Invasion of the Bee Girls (1973) and you will find movies that lack stars and big budgets and fancy special effects but are funny and fun in a way that Burton's mega production never really understands."

Kenneth Turan of the Los Angeles Times wrote that "Mars Attacks! is all 1990s cynicism and disbelief, mocking the conventions that Independence Day takes seriously. This all sounds clever enough but in truth, Mars Attacks! is not as much fun as it should be. Few of its numerous actors make a lasting impression and Burton's heart and soul is not in the humor". Desson Thomson from The Washington Post said "Mars Attacks! evokes plenty of sci-fi classics, from The Day the Earth Stood Still (1951) to Dr. Strangelove (1964), but it doesn't do much beyond that superficial exercise. Except for Burton's jolting sight gags (I may never recover from the vision of Sarah Jessica Parker's head grafted onto the body of a chihuahua), the comedy is half-developed, pedestrian material. And the climactic battle between Earthlings and Martians is dull and overextended."

Richard Schickel, writing in Time magazine, gave a positive review. "You have to admire everyone's chutzpah: the breadth of Burton's (and writer Jonathan Gems') movie references, which range from Kurosawa to Kubrick; and above all their refusal to offer us a single likable character. Perhaps they don't create quite enough deeply funny earthlings to go around, but a thoroughly mean-spirited big-budget movie is always a treasurable rarity." Jonathan Rosenbaum from the Chicago Reader praised the surreal humor and black comedy, which he found to be in the vein of Dr. Strangelove and Gremlins (1984). He said it was far from clear whether the movie was a satire, although critics were describing it as one. Todd McCarthy of Variety called Mars Attacks! "a cult sci-fi comedy miscast as an elaborate, all-star studio extravaganza."

Jonathan Palmer reviewed Mars Attacks for Arcane magazine, rating it a 7 out of 10 overall, and stated that "When, eventually, the martians start getting their comeuppance, I was reminded of Winston Smith's experience in the early cinema scene in 1984, but I ignored that thought and just sat back to enjoy the carnage."

Audiences surveyed by CinemaScore gave the film a grade of "B" on a scale of A+ to F.

=== Awards ===
Mars Attacks! was on the shortlist for the Academy Award for Best Visual Effects nominations, but the Academy of Motion Picture Arts and Sciences selected Independence Day, Dragonheart, and Twister instead. The film was nominated for seven categories at the Saturn Awards. Danny Elfman won Best Music, while director Tim Burton, writer Jonathan Gems, actor Lukas Haas, costume designer Colleen Atwood and the visual effects department at Industrial Light & Magic received nominations. Mars Attacks! was nominated for both the Saturn Award for Best Science Fiction Film (which went to Independence Day) and the Hugo Award for Best Dramatic Presentation.

== See also ==
- Hocus-Pocus and Frisby. Unable to overpower his alien abductors or persuade them to release him, the protagonist decides to relax by playing his harmonica. The sound causes unbearable pain to the aliens and renders some of them unconscious.
- List of films featuring miniature people
- List of films featuring extraterrestrials
- List of films set in Las Vegas
- Mars in fiction

== Works cited ==
- Jonathan Gems (January 1997). Mars Attacks!. Novelization of the film. London: Puffin Books. ISBN 978-0-14-038587-8.
- Karen Jones (November 1996). Mars Attacks! The Art of the Movie. Del Rey Books. ISBN 978-0-345-40998-0.
- Thomas Kent Miller. Mars in the Movies: A History. Jefferson, North Carolina: McFarland & Company, 2016. ISBN 978-0-7864-9914-4.
- Ron Magid. "Attack Formation" in Cinescape, Volume 3, Number 4. Lombard, IL: MVP Entertainment, Inc., January/February 1997.
