= Thun'da =

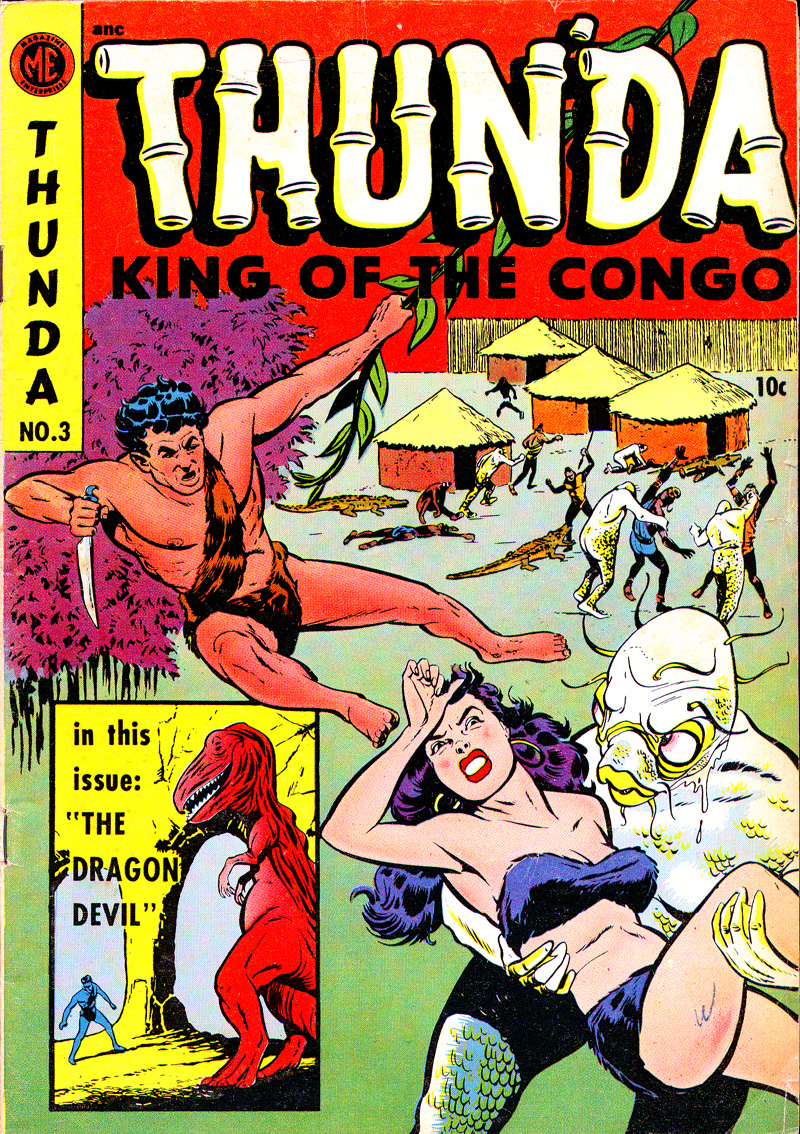
- Thun'da #3 (1952). Art by Bob Powell.

Publication information
- Publisher: Magazine Enterprises
- First appearance: Thun'da #1 (1952)
- Created by: Frank Frazetta

In-story information
- Alter ego: Roger Drum

Thun'da is a fictional character created by artist and conceptualist Frank Frazetta for comic-book publisher Magazine Enterprises. The character debuted in Thun'da #1 (1952), with writer Gardner Fox scripting. After only a few issues the title was discontinued in 1953.

The character, played by Buster Crabbe, was the main character in the 1952 Columbia Pictures serial King of the Congo.

== Publication history ==
The character first appeared in 1952 in the comic series Thun'da #1.

Editor Ray Krank asked Frank Frazetta to remove the prehistoric story elements, but he refused and left the title instead and began looking for work outside of comic book illustration.

== Fictional character biography ==
Thun'da was Roger Drum, a World War II United States Army Air Forces officer who was shot down while flying over a valley deep in the heart of Africa. After crashing, he freed himself from his aircraft only to be captured by hostile ape-men. He managed to escape, and wandered through the valley, pushing himself to exercise daily and becoming a paragon of physical perfection. It was while he was wandering that he was spotted by Pha, the queen of the people who lived in the valley. After fighting and destroying the hostile ape-men, Thun'da rushed to their temple and rang the sacred gong, thereby summoning "the mother of all serpents," whom he killed with the last three shots from his revolver. He won the respect of Pha's people, and they worshipped him as if he were a god. Later, after an earthquake ravaged the lost valley, Thun'da was able to get Pha to safety along with their pet sabretoothed tiger, but her people were killed and the lost valley was sealed from them forever.

== Collected editions ==
The comic series was reprinted in 1987 by Fantagraphics Books as Frank Frazetta's Thun'da Tales, and, in August 2010, Dark Horse Comics released a hardcover collection Thun'da, King of the Congo Archive (ISBN 1595824707).

== Other media ==
The screen rights for the character were bought by Columbia Pictures, who brought Thun'da to the screen in the serial King of the Congo (1952), featuring Buster Crabbe as Roger Drum, the officer who becomes Thunda. In the serial, Roger Drum was assigned to take a valuable microfilm to a new location, but was shot down en route, and crashed in the secluded lost valley. The spies named in the microfilm try to obtain it, and Thunda must try to get it back. King of the Congo was both the last Tarzanesque serial and the last serial to star Buster Crabbe.
