= Gloria Dea =

American actress (1922–2023)

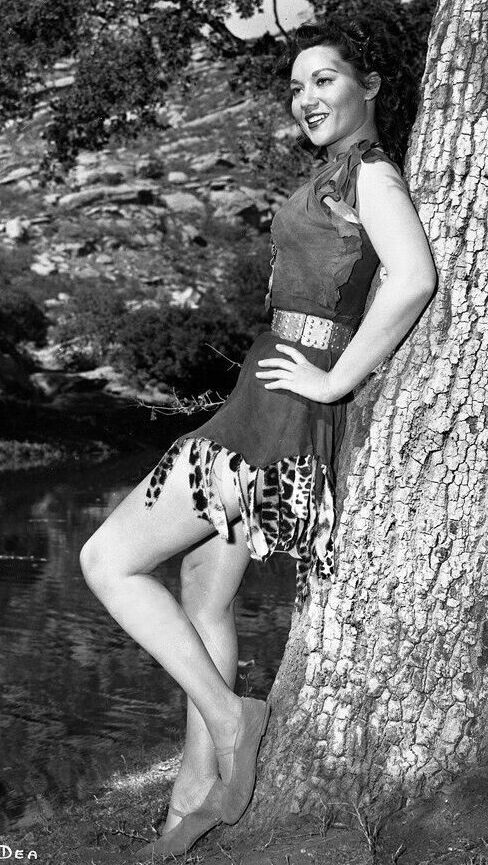
- Dea in a promotional image for King of the Congo, 1952
- Born: Gloria Metzner; August 25, 1922; Alameda, California, U.S.
- Died: March 18, 2023 (aged 100); Las Vegas, Nevada, U.S.
- Occupations: Actress; magician; dancer
- Spouses: Jack Statham (m. 1944; div. 1945); Hal Borne (m. 1946, divorced); Jack Shulem (m. 1955, divorced); Sam Anzalone (died 2022)

Gloria Metzner (August 25, 1922 – March 18, 2023), better known by the stage name of Gloria Dea /ˈdeɪ/ DAY, was an American actress, dancer, artist, and magician. Dea is noted for being the first magician to have performed on Las Vegas Strip, as well as appearing in films during the Golden Age of Hollywood.

== Life and career ==
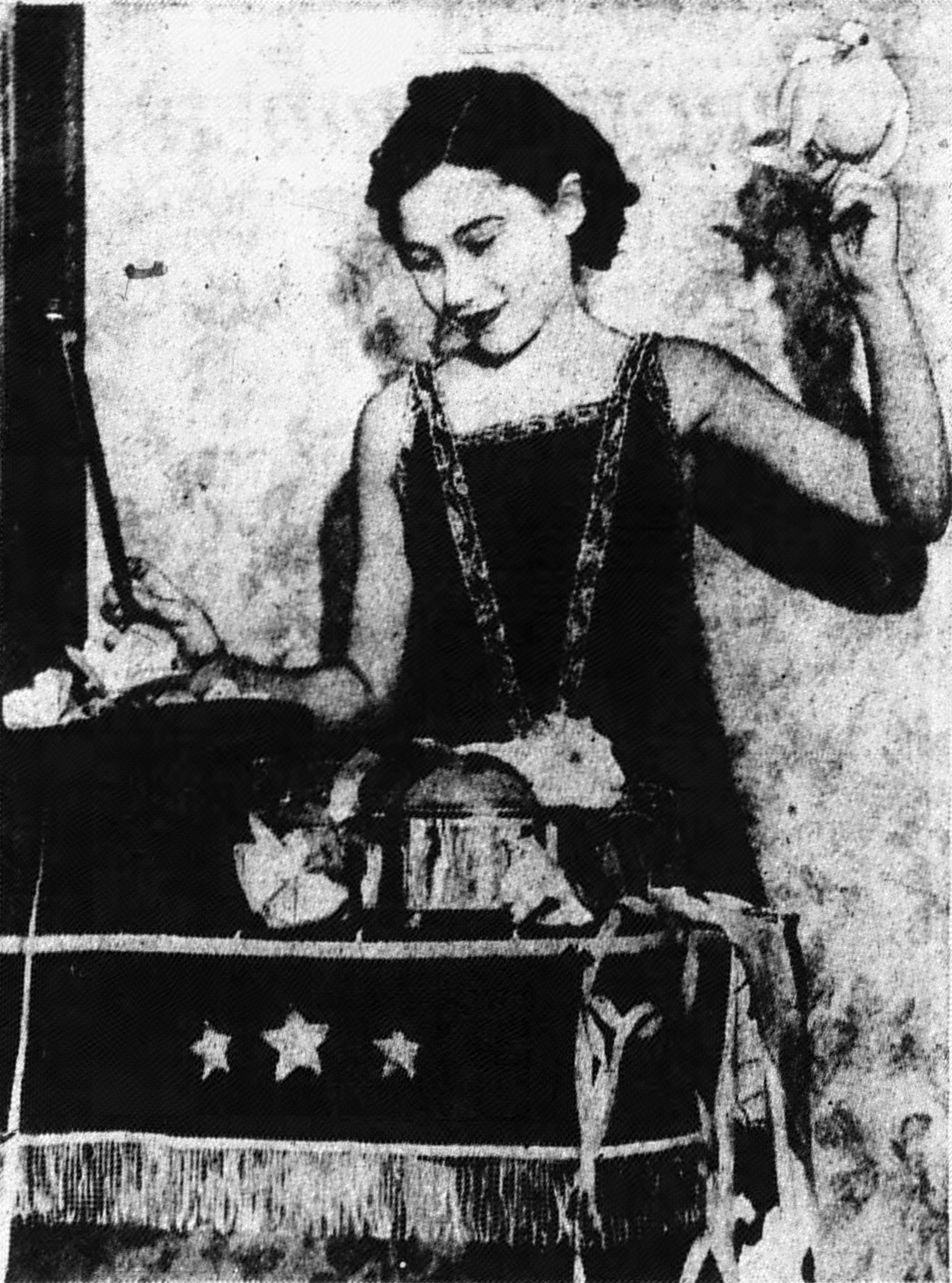
Gloria Metzner performs at age 11, in 1934

=== Early life and work as magician ===
Gloria Metzner was born in Oakland, California, United States, on August 25, 1922, to Martha (née Heyman) and Leo Metzner. In World War I, Leo Metzner served in the 363rd Infantry Regiment of the 91st Division, then returned home to become a paint salesman and owner of a chain of paint stores. He had also performed as a magician in local circles under the stage name of "The Great Leo".

Gloria Metzner started performing tricks at the age of four and, by the age of seven, was noted as being "the youngest working magician in the world". She specialized in the hat trick, from which she pulled her two pet guinea pigs and a pigeon. At the age of 11, she was one of the youngest members of the Pacific Coast Association of Magicians, and at age 12 won an award from the association for best work with livestock in competition. Metzner performed as a magician at El Rancho Vegas on May 14, 1941, making her the first magician to have performed on the Las Vegas Strip.

=== Film and art career ===
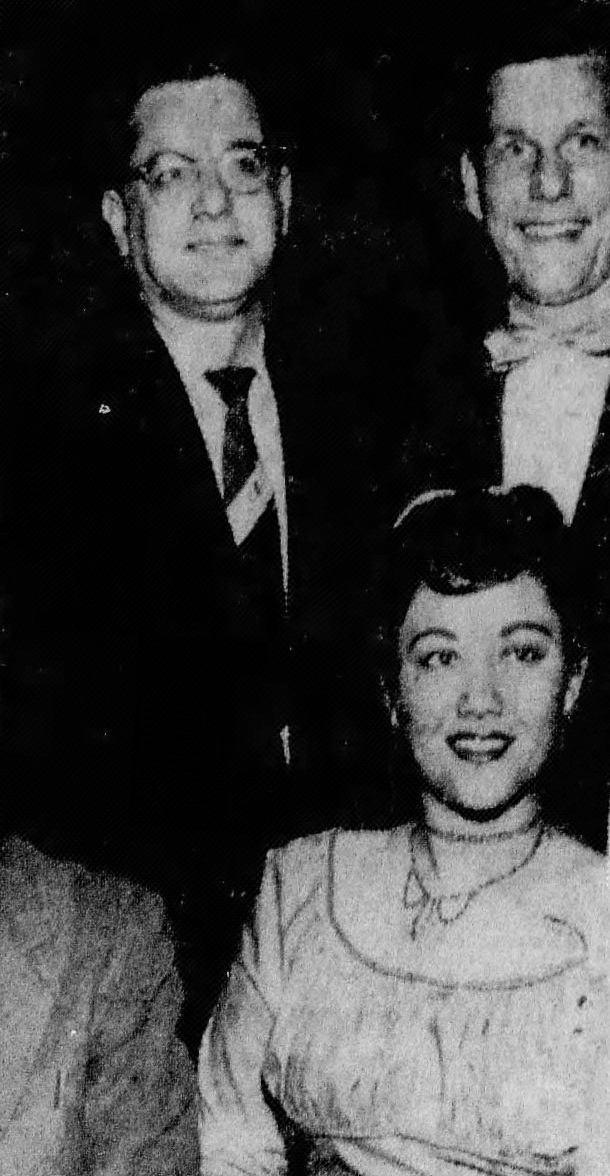
Husband Jack Shulem, left, with Gloria Dea Shulem, bottom, in 1956

As her career in show magic came to an end, she moved to Southern California and became an actress in Hollywood films from the mid-1940s to late 1950s, adopting the stage name Gloria Dea. For much of this time, Dea was contracted with Columbia Pictures. During the filming of 1944's Delightfully Dangerous, in which Dea performed as a dancer, producer Charles R. Rogers paused filming for twenty minutes so that Dea could marry her fiancé, orchestra leader Jack Statham. The couple had been unable to marry previously due to time clashes with their work schedules. By March 1945, Dea and Statham had separated. Dea's second marriage was to Hal Borne, noted for being the rehearsal pianist of Fred Astaire. They were married in Los Angeles in April 1946. In 1952, Dea took on her most prominent role, playing the lead of native girl Princess Pha in the 1952 film King of the Congo, in which she starred opposite Buster Crabbe. Her other film credits include Mexicana (1945) and Plan 9 from Outer Space (1957).

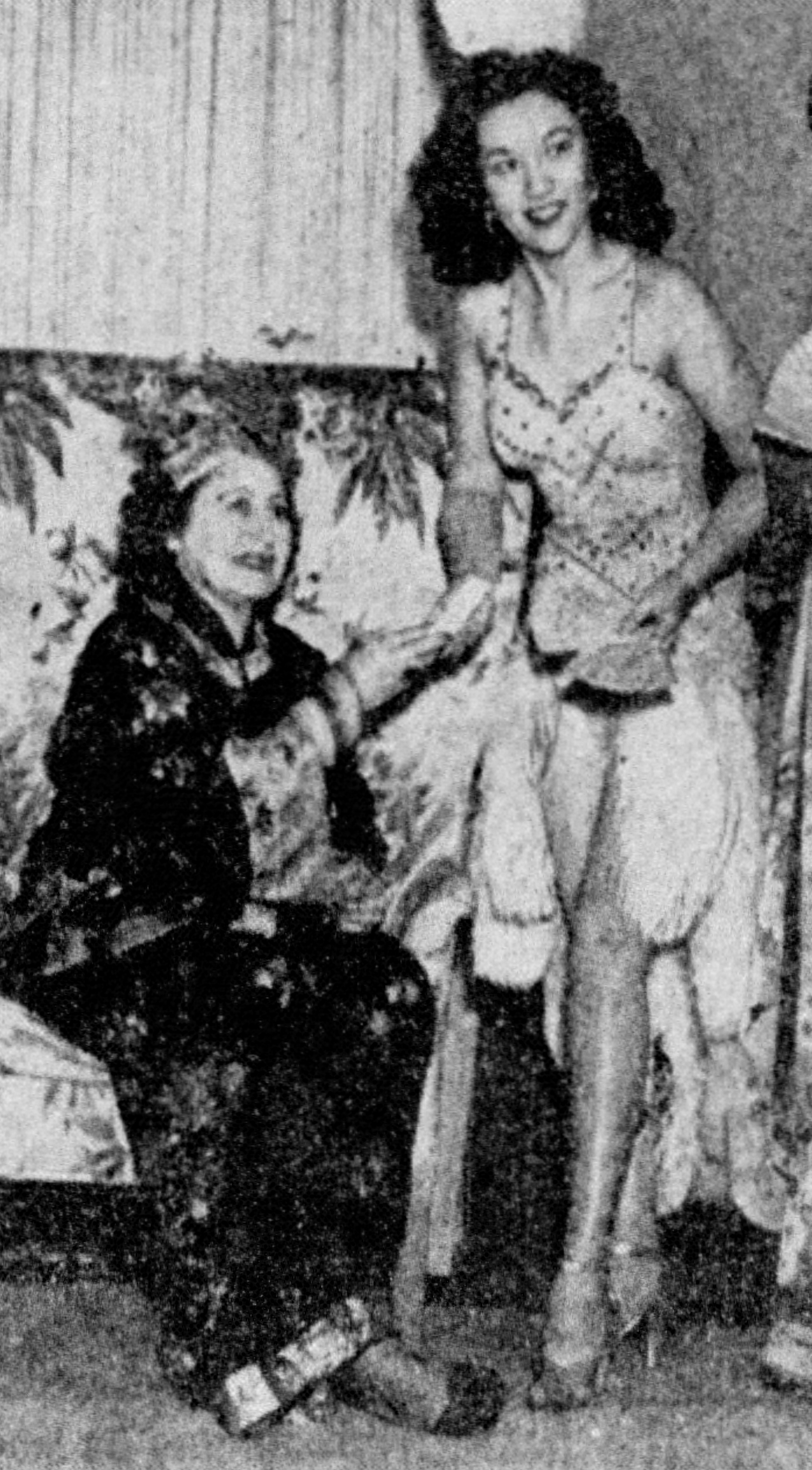
Mother Martha Day, left, and Gloria Dea, at a costume party to benefit Hadassah in 1952

In 1954, Dea represented the American Guild of Variety Artists as a founding board member of the San Fernando Labor Co-ordinating Council, a united San Fernando Valley area labor union group that predated the merger of the AFL-CIO. Credit for the Council's founding was given to Jack Shulem, from the International Typographical Union. By 1956, they had married, and she was using the name Gloria Dea Shulem while continuing on the Council board.

The couple lived in Burbank, California, in a house which Dea decorated with Greek gods which she drew using charcoal, oil paint, and gold leaf, and curtains that she had received national coverage for, decorated with drawings and glued-on beads. Besides labor and art, Dea was active in Burbank community organizations, being chair of the Hobby Show, and member of the Women's Council, B'nai Brith, Beautiful Committee, and Hadassah, often accompanying her mother. Dea was elected president of the Burbank Hadassah in 1957, and won a Women's Council service award in 1964.

=== Later life ===
After leaving the entertainment industry, Dea sold insurance, and then new and used cars for a Chevrolet dealership in the San Fernando Valley. She later moved back to Las Vegas in 1980, residing in the Paradise Palms community with her husband, Sam Anzalone, a fellow auto dealer she met at the Chevrolet dealership. Anzalone died in January 2022, and Dea turned 100 in August. She celebrated the event at the Westgate Las Vegas with other magicians, including David Copperfield. Dea occasionally performed magic tricks at the assisted-living residence in Las Vegas where she lived.

Dea died from coronary artery disease at her Las Vegas residence on March 18, 2023, at age 100.

== Filmography ==
Gloria Dea filmography
Year	Title	Role
1944	The Story of Dr. Wassell	Javanese Nurse
1945	Delightfully Dangerous	Clown dancer
1945	Mexicana	Speciality dancer
1952	King of the Congo	Princess Pha
1952	Something to Live For	Slave girl
1955	The Prodigal	Faradine
1955	The Sea Chase	Señorita
1956	Around the World in 80 Days	Extra
1957	Plan 9 from Outer Space	Girl
