= Bob Powell =

American comic book artist (1916–1967)

- Born: Stanley Robert Pawlowski; October 2, 1916
- Died: December 1967 (aged 51) Huntington, New York, U.S.
- Area: Artist

Bob Powell (né Stanley Robert Pawlowski; October 6, 1916 – October 1, 1967) was an American comic book artist known for his work during the 1930–1940s Golden Age of comic books, including on the features "Sheena, Queen of the Jungle" and "Mr. Mystic". He received a belated credit in 1999 for co-writing the debut of the popular feature "Blackhawk". Powell also did the pencil art for the bubble gum trading card series Mars Attacks. He officially changed his name to S. Robert Powell in 1943.

== Biography ==
=== Early life and career ===
Raised in Buffalo, New York, Bob Powell moved to Manhattan, New York City in the 1930's where he studied art at Pratt Institute. Like many comics artists of the time, he found work at Eisner & Iger, one of the most prominent "packagers" who supplied completed comic books to publishers testing the emerging market. Powell's first published comic-book art is tentatively identified as the uncredited three-page story "A Letter of Introduction", featuring the famed ventriloquist Edgar Bergen and his dummy, Charlie McCarthy, in Fiction House's Jumbo Comics #2 (Oct. 1938). Another of his earliest works, under the pseudonym Arthur Dean, was penciling the adventure feature "Dr. Fung" in Fox Feature Syndicate's Wonder Comics #1 (May 1939) and subsequently.

Powell also did early work for Fox's Wonderworld Comics and Mystery Men Comics; Fiction House's Planet Comics, where his strips included "Gale Allen and the Women's Space Battalion"; Harvey Comics' Speed Comics, for which he wrote and drew the feature "Ted Parrish", (pencilling at least once under the pseudonym Bob Stanley); Timely Comics' one-shot Tough Kid Squad Comics; Quality Comics' Crack Comics (where he pencilled as Terence McAully), Hit Comics (as Stanley Charlot), Military Comics (where he signed his pencils for the "Loops and Banks" aviation strip as Bud Ernest), Smash Comics (as Powell Roberts), and Feature Comics. Other pseudonyms included Rex Smith and W. Morgan Thomas, as well as Buck Stanley, S. T. Anley, and Major Ralston.

=== Sheena and superheroes ===
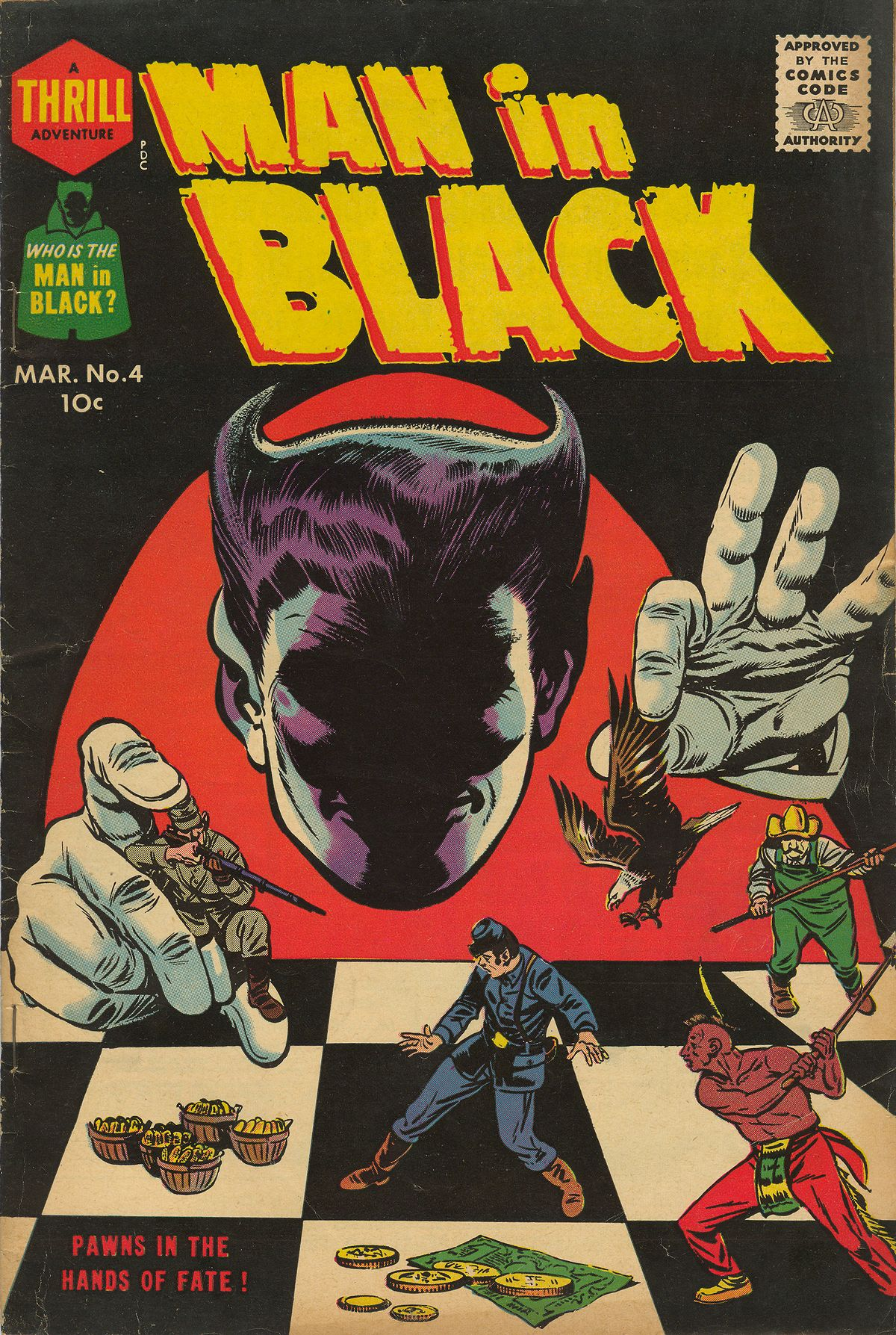
Art by Powell on the cover of Man in Black #4 (March 1958).

As part of the Eisner & Iger studio, Powell drew many of the earliest adventures of the jungle-queen Sheena in Jumbo Comics. Later, after Will Eisner split off to form his own studio in an arrangement with Quality publisher Everett M. "Busy" Arnold — bringing Powell, Nick Cardy, Chuck Cuidera, Lou Fine and others with him — Powell pitched in to co-write the premiere of "Blackhawk," created by Eisner and Cuidera, in Military Comics #1 (Aug. 1941). Powell remained uncredited until Eisner and Cuidera, in a 1999 panel, discussed his contribution.

Eisner in 2005 recalled his studio as "a friendly shop, and I guess I was the same age as the youngest guys there. We all got along. The only ones who ever got into a hassle were George Tuska and Bob Powell. Powell was kind of a wiseguy and made remarks about other people in the shop. One day, George had enough of it, got up, and punched out Bob Powell". Eisner on another occasion said his partnership with Everett M. "Busy" Arnold created tensions when Arnold wanted to hire Powell separately:

...Arnold had his own line of books, and we were sometimes competitors. He offered Bob Powell an increase on what I was paying him for working on "The Spirit Section", and Bob came to me and said, "I can make more with your partners." I called up Arnold and said, "You want a lawsuit?" Arnold apologized but Powell got very angry, and he said, "You ruined my career! You cut me off." I said, "Well, you want to quit me, and go down the street and work for someone else...well, all right. But you're not going to work for my partner while I'm around." Anyway, we settled it. When I went into the service ... I got a letter from Bob Powell that said, "Well, now that you're in the Army, you might get killed. I want to tell you that I forgive you."

Artist Nick Cardy, a colleague at the Eisner studio, said Powell "came in later when I was doing [the 'Spirit Section' feature] 'Lady Luck'. He was sitting behind me. He would help a kid around the block — tell a newcomer to take it easy and that sort of thing".

Powell became particularly known for his "good girl art" in Magazine Enterprises' Cave Girl, and in Fiction House's Jungle Comics, where he worked on early Sheena stories and later on the zebra-bikini'd jungle adventuress Camilla.

In the realm of superhero comics, Powell co-created the patriotic character personifying the Spirit of '76, in Harvey's Pocket Comics #1 (Aug. 1941). It would become a long-running feature in Harvey's Green Hornet Comics. Powell also penciled a Golden Age Captain America story, "The Sorcerer's Sinister Secret", in Timely's All Winners Comics #4 (Spring 1942), and pencilled a chapter of the historic All Winners Comics #19 (Fall 1946). He drew the backup feature "Mr. Mystic" in Eisner's "The Spirit Section", a 16-page comic-book insert for Sunday newspapers, from the feature's inception in 1940 until Powell entered the U.S. Army Air Forces for his World War II military service in 1943, the same year he officially changed his name to S. Robert Powell.

As comics historian and critic Tom Heintjes wrote,

After The Spirit, perhaps the best drawn feature in the section was Powell's 'Mr. Mystic'. Eisner created Mr. Mystic by retooling his Yarko the Great, which had been syndicated overseas. After running through Eisner's scripts, Powell wrote and drew the feature until he was drafted a couple of years later. (A very good artist, Powell was a journeyman writer who tried but never managed to sell Eisner on some Spirit scripts, a situation that rankled Powell for some time.) 'Mr. Mystic' was cut from the Sunday section's lineup in 1944, by which time Fred Guardineer was handling its production.

=== Post-war Powell ===
Cave Girl #1 (1988), AC Comics' reprint of Magazine Enterprises' Cave Girl #11 (1954). Cover art by Powell.

Following his discharge, Powell formed his own studio and drew for numerous comic-book publishers. His work in the 1950s included features and covers for Street and Smith's Shadow Comics; Magazine Enterprises' Bobby Benson's B-Bar-B Riders, based on the children's television series, and all four issues of that publisher's Strong Man; and, for Harvey Comics, many war, romance, and horror stories, as well as work for the comics Man in Black, Adventures in 3-D and True 3-D.

Howard Nostrand, who joined as one of Powell's assistants in 1948, recalled working alongside fellow assistants "George Siefringer, who [drew] backgrounds [and] Martin Epp, who inked, lettered and helped George on backgrounds. I started out inking and then got into doing backgrounds ... and then penciling." Features on which they worked during this period included "Red Hawk" in Magazine Enterprises' Straight Arrow; and, for Fawcett Comics, work in Hot Rod Comics, an adaptation of the film The Red Badge of Courage, and "a couple of Westerns" including the movie-spinoff feature "Lash LaRue".

In 1961, Powell became art director for the satirical magazine Sick, working there until his death. On a freelance basis, he worked on Topps' 1962 Mars Attacks trading cards, doing the final pencil art based on early pencils roughs by Wally Wood; Norman Saunders then did the final painted art. Powell had previously worked with Saunders and others on Topps' 1961 Civil War News series of cards.

During this 1960s period that fans and historians call the Silver Age of comic books, Powell also drew a handful of stories for Marvel Comics featuring the superheroes Daredevil, Giant-Man, the Hulk and the Human Torch.

As commentator and columnist Fred Hembeck described Powell's brief tenure at Marvel,

Powell bowed with what was then only the latest — but not last — Giant-Man revamp in Tales to Astonish #65 (March 1965), and was in charge of the exceedingly disappointing meeting between the Human Torch, the Thing, and the Beatles (Strange Tales #130, also March 1965). In all, the former Eisner associate would pencil the final five [Giant-Man] plots (working over [Jack] Kirby's layouts on the last four), also pencil the last five Torch/Thing duo deals ... did layouts for Wally Wood's last three Daredevil issues ... and would wind up his days at Marvel pencilling two Hulk stories (Tales To Astonish #73 and #74, November and December 1965, both over Kirby breakdowns — one inked by himself, and the second by Mike Esposito).

In comic strips, Powell drew writer Bessie Little's short-lived Teena-a-Go-Go (1966) and the similarly short-lived Bat Masterson strip (1959–1960).

Sources differ on the date of Powell's death. The Social Security Death Index confirms his birth date as October 2, 1916, but gives his death date only as December 1967. A standard reference source, the Lambiek Comiclopedia, gives a birth date (October 6, 1916) at odds with the U.S. government record, and a death date of October 1, 1967.

== Legacy ==
Some Powell’s work has been reprinted and collected, beginning with full comic-book reproductions by Bill Black’s AC Comics. In 2011, Yoe Books released Bob Powell’s Terror. In 2014, Kitchen Sink Books and Dark Horse released The Complete Bob Powell's Cave Girl, followed in 2015 by The Complete Bob Powell's Jet Powers.
