= Magazine Enterprises =

American comic book company

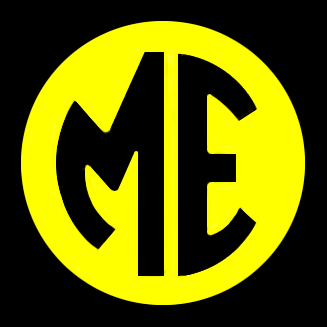
- Founded: 1943
- Founder: Vin Sullivan
- Defunct: 1958
- Country of origin: United States
- Headquarters location: New York City, New York
- Key people: Bob Powell, Dick Ayers, Jerry Siegel, Joe Shuster
- Publication types: Comic books
- Fiction genres: Western, humor, crime, adventure, children's

Magazine Enterprises was an American comic book publishing company lasting from 1943 to 1958, which published primarily Western, humor, crime, adventure, and children's comics, with virtually no superheroes. It was founded by Vin Sullivan, an editor at Columbia Comics and before that the editor at National Allied Publications, the future DC Comics.

Magazine Enterprises' characters include the jungle goddess Cave Girl, drawn by Bob Powell, and Ghost Rider, a horror fiction-themed Western avenger created by writer Ray Krank and artist Dick Ayers in 1949; after the trademark lapsed, Ayers and others adapted it as Marvel Comics' non-horror but otherwise near-identical Western character Ghost Rider in 1967.

Magazine Enterprises should not be confused with the same-name Scottish company that published science fiction magazines from at least 1946 to 1960.

== Publication history ==
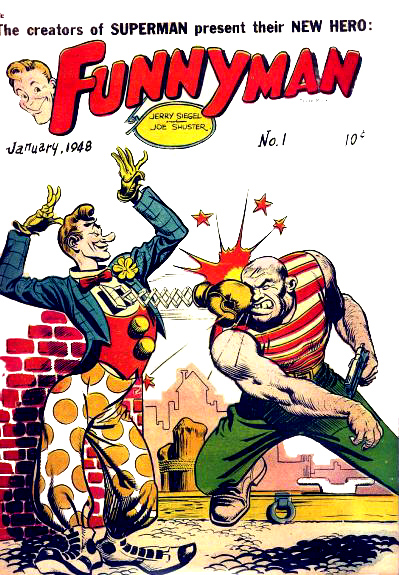
Funnyman #1 (Jan. 1948). Cover art by Joe Shuster.

In late 1947, Superman creators Jerry Siegel and Joe Shuster collaborated once again with editor Vin Sullivan, who had worked with the writer-artist team during their nascent days freelancing for National Allied Publications, the future DC Comics. The duo had decamped to Magazine Enterprises after leaving National Allied (by then called National Comics) and suing to regain the rights to Superman and their later creation, Superboy. Siegel and Shuster brought most of their studio's artists with them, except for 1950s Superman penciler Wayne Boring, and created the new character Funnyman, a slapstick-comedian hero. Both as a comic book and as a comic strip, however, the character failed to find an audience.

Magazine Enterprises' best-known character may be Ghost Rider, a horror-themed Western avenger created by writer Ray Krank and artist Dick Ayers in 1949. After the trademark lapsed, Ayers and others adapted it as Marvel Comics' non-horror but otherwise near-identical Western character Ghost Rider in 1967.

The company's two superhero characters were the Avenger, created by writer Gardner Fox and artist Dick Ayers in The Avenger #1 (March 1955), with Bob Powell drawing the character's three subsequent issues and all four covers; and the aptly named Strong Man, an unmasked, super-strong hero in a jungle-print circus strongman outfit. The Avenger was one of the very few traditional, costumed superheroes created during the period before superheroes' revival in what historians and fans call the Silver Age of Comics, beginning 1956.

Other original characters include the jungle goddess Cave Girl, drawn by Bob Powell, and the talking animal canine hero Hot Dog, created by cartoonist George Crenshaw and unrelated to the later Archie Comics character of that name.

Among the company's publications were licensed film and TV comics featuring comedian Jimmy Durante; suave actor Dick Powell; and the CBS television series The Adventures of Robin Hood, starring Richard Greene. Additionally, Little Miss Sunbeam Comics starred the blond, pig-tailed mascot of Sunbeam Bread.

Since the copyright to Magazine Enterprises' comics do not appear to have been renewed, they evidently fell into the public domain in accordance with copyright laws at the time. Beginning in the 1980s, AC Comics issued reprint titles of Magazine Enterprises material, along with those of other defunct publishers of that era. As well, AC revived the Avenger as a guest star in FemForce #19 (1989; no cover date), then creating a new series. Ghost Rider reprints appeared in 1999 with the character renamed the Haunted Horseman.

== Titles by genre ==
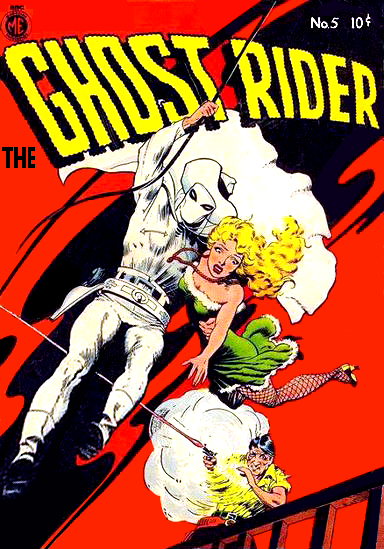
The Ghost Rider #5 a.k.a. A-1 Comics #37 (1951; no cover date), featuring the company's best-known character. Cover art by Frank Frazetta.

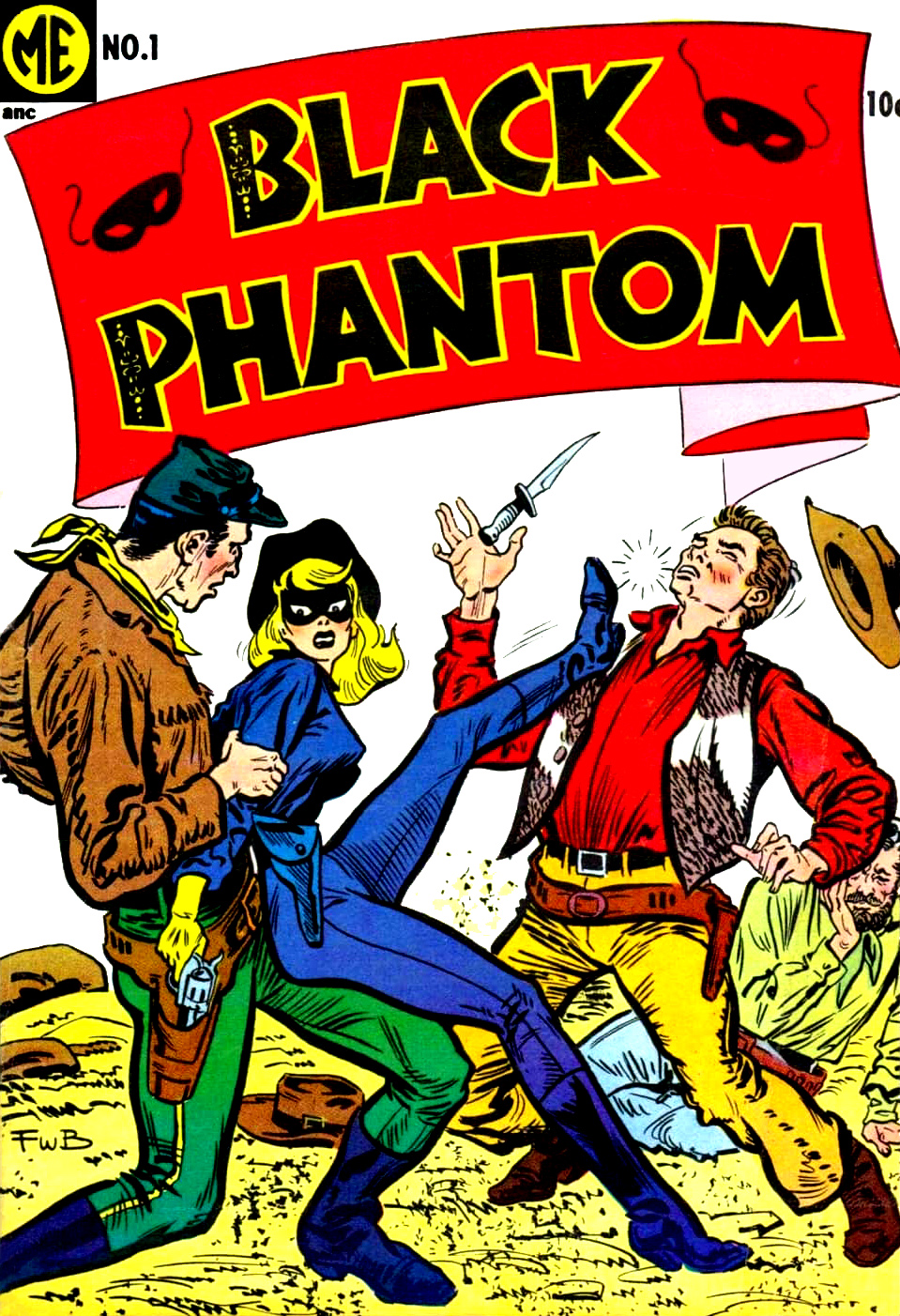
Black Phantom #1 (1954; no cover date). Cover art by Frank Bolle.

=== Children's ===
- Clubhouse Rascals
- Ding Dong
- The Pixies
- Koko and Kola
- Little Miss Sunbeam Comics
- Mighty Atom (child superhero, not the anime character)
- Mighty Atom and the Pixies
- Muggsy Mouse (1951 and 1954 series)
- Tom-Tom and Itchi the Monk
- Tom-Tom, The Jungle Boy
- Tick Tock Tales
- Vacation Comics

=== Crime ===
- Dick Powell a.k.a. Star Parade Presents Dick Powell
- I'm A Cop
- Kerry Drake Detective Cases
- The Killers
- Manhunt
- Mysteries of Scotland Yard
- Undercover Girl

=== Historical adventure ===
- Robin Hood (1955–1957; see also Movie/TV, below)
- Dan'l Boone

=== Humor ===
- The Brain
- Dogface Dooley
- Dotty Dripple
- Hot Dog
- Jimmy Durante Comics

=== Jungle ===
- Africa
- Cave Girl
- Thun'da

=== Misc. ===
- A-1 Comics

Rotating anthology sometimes used as an alternate title/issue number; for example, Hot Dog #3 was also A-1 Comics #24; Danger is Their Business #11 (the only issue of that title published) was also A-1 Comics #50; Home Run #3 (the only issue of that title published) was also A-1 Comics #89; and Ghost Rider #1-14 was also A-1 #27, 29, 31, 34, 37, 44, 51, 57, 69, 71, 75, 80, 84 & 112.

- Extra Comics

=== Movie/TV ===
- The Adventures of Robin Hood (1957; see also Historical Adventure, above)
- Keen Teens
- Movie Thrillers

See also: Dick Powell (Crime), Jimmy Durante Comics (Humor), Tim Holt (Western)

=== Romance ===
- Dream Book of Love
- Dream Book of Romance
- Romantic Picture Novellettes

=== Science fiction ===
- Jet Powers
- Major Inapak the Space Ace a.k.a. Space Ace

=== Sports ===
- Pride of the Yankees

=== Superhero ===
- The Avenger
- Funnyman
- Strong Man

=== War ===
- The American Air Forces
- United States Marines

=== Western ===
- Badmen of the West! (1953–1954)
- Best of the West (1951–1954)
- Black Phantom (1954)
- Bobby Benson's B-Bar-B Riders (1950–1953)
- Cowboys 'N' Injuns/Cowboys and Indians (1946–1952)
- Durango Kid (1949–1955)
- Ghost Rider (1950–1954)
- Great Western (1953–1954)
- Guns of Fact and Fiction (1948)
- Red Hawk (1953)
- Red Mask (1954–1957)
- Straight Arrow (1950–1956)
- Straight Arrow's Fury (1954)
- Tim Holt (1948–1954)
- Trail Colt (1949)
- White Indian (1953–1955)
