= Jonathan Gems =

British playwright and screenwriter (born 1952)

- Born: 1952 (age 73–74); United Kingdom
- Occupations: Playwright, screenwriter
- Relatives: Pam Gems (mother); Keith Gems (father); Milla Gems (former spouse m. 2000–2009)
- Writing career
- Language: English
- Genres: Theatre, film

Jonathan Gems (born 1952, in London) is a British playwright and screenwriter mostly known for his work on Mars Attacks! (1996), directed by Tim Burton. He also wrote the film's novelization. His well known work includes a screenplay for an adaptation of George Orwell's novel 1984 and Mars Attacks Memoirs, a book of interviews about working with Tim Burton behind the scenes of Mars Attacks!.

The son of the playwright Pam Gems, Gems wrote a number of plays for theatres on the London fringe before gradually turning to screenwriting. As well as Mars Attacks!, Gems did uncredited rewrite work on Batman (1989). Gems has written unproduced scripts for Burton, including a Beetlejuice (1988) sequel titled Beetlejuice Goes Hawaiian; an updating of Edgar Allan Poe's "The Fall of the House of Usher" set in Burbank, California; The Hawkline Monster, a cowboy/monster movie that was to star Clint Eastwood and Jack Nicholson; and Go Baby Go, a beach movie in the style of films by Russ Meyer.

== Plays ==
- The Tax Exile (produced 1979)
- Naked Robots (produced 1980)
- The Paranormalist (produced 1982)
- Susan's Breasts (produced 1985)
