= Norman Saunders (artist) =

American commercial artist

- Saunders and wife Ellen posing together to model a 1953 Western fiction cover painting.
- Born: Norman Blaine Saunders; January 1, 1907; Minot, North Dakota, U.S.
- Died: March 7, 1989 (aged 82); Columbus, Nebraska, U.S.
- Education: Grand Central School of Art
- Known for: Painting, illustration
- Notable work: Mars Attacks, Wacky Packages
- Website: https://www.normansaunders.com/

Norman Blaine Saunders (January 1, 1907 – March 7, 1989) was a prolific 20th-century American commercial artist. He is best known for paintings in pulp magazines, paperbacks, men's adventure magazines, comic books and trading cards. On occasion, Saunders signed his work with his middle name, Blaine.

== Biography ==
=== Early life and career ===
Saunders was born in Minot, North Dakota, but his earliest memories were from the family's homestead near Bemidji in northern Minnesota where he and his parents lived in a one-room cabin. He recalled moving north at age seven, to Roseau County on the Canada–US border, where his father was a game warden and a touring Presbyterian minister. "A tribe of the Chippewa Indians were there and by the time I was 12, was practically a blood brother."

Saunders' career was launched when his contributions to Captain Billy's Whiz Bang resulted in a job with Fawcett Publications, where he was employed from 1928 to 1934. He explained in 1983 the events that led to his arrival at Fawcett's offices in Robbinsdale, Minnesota:

I was hitchhiking, got into this Model-T Ford with a big trunk strapped up and these two guys in front. One of them had a gun, a rifle. He said, "Keep your eye peeled on the back, kid, see if there are any police or motorcycle cops or something." What the hell was this? These two guys had robbed somebody, or tried to, out in North Dakota, and they had stolen this car from some farmer and were trying to get away. As we got to the outskirts of Bemidji, I was getting awful nervous. There at the town they saw a sand pit with a big hole dug out of it, and they took this car over and got out and pushed it in. They went that way, and I went this way. That night I caught a freight train to Minneapolis. I took a streetcar ride to the end of the line, and there was a two-story bank there and a big sign: "Robbinsdale, the home of Fawcett Publications." I said, "By gosh and by gracious, we got us a real true publisher here!" There was where they were printing Captain Billy's Whiz Bang.

=== Pulp paintings ===
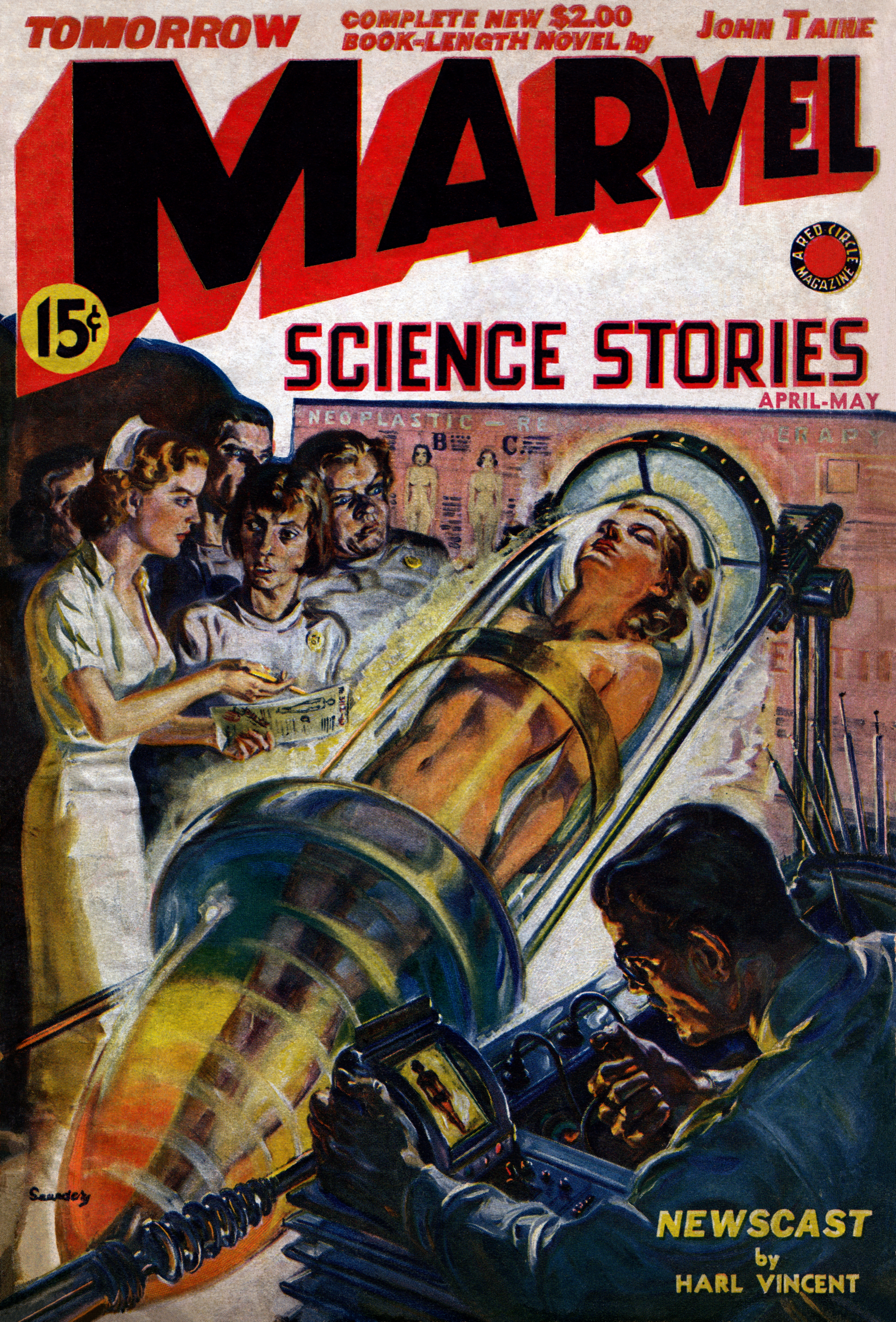
Norman Saunders' cover for Marvel Science Stories (April–May 1939)

He left Fawcett to become a freelance pulp artist, moved to New York City and studied under Harvey Dunn at the Grand Central School of Art. He painted for all the major publishers and was known for his fast-action scenes, his beautiful women and his ability to meet a deadline. He worked in almost any genre—Westerns, weird menace, detective, sports and the saucy pulps (sometimes signed as "Blaine"). He was able to paint very quickly, producing 100 paintings a year—two a week from 1935 through 1942—and thus lived well during the Depression era.

During World War II, Saunders served with the Military Police overseeing German prisoners. Transferred to the Army Corps of Engineers, he supervised the construction of a gas pipeline following the Burma Road. During his off hours, he painted watercolors of Burmese temples.

=== Trading cards ===
In 1958, Saunders obtained his first assignment from the trading cards company Topps, painting over photographs of baseball players who had been traded, so that they would appear to be wearing the jersey of their new team. Topps soon employed Saunders to create artwork for many other cards, including the 1962 Mars Attacks series and the Batman TV series in 1966.

Product developer Len Brown, inspired by Wally Wood's cover for EC Comics' Weird Science #16, pitched the idea to art director Woody Gelman. Wood fleshed out his and Gelman's initial sketches, and Bob Powell did the final designs. Saunders painted the 55-card set.

The cards were test marketed by Topps through a dummy corporation called Bubbles, Inc. under the name Attack From Space. Sales were sufficient to expand the marketing, and the name was changed to Mars Attacks. The cards sparked parental and community outrage over their graphic violence and implied sexuality. Topps responded initially by repainting 13 of the cards to reduce the gore and sexuality; then, following inquiries from a Connecticut district attorney, Topps agreed to halt production before the altered cards could be added.

Saunders also produced a number of less well-known trading card series, including Ugly Stickers, Nutty Initials, Make Your Own Name Stickers and Civil War News. Wacky Packages was Norman Saunders' last major art project, and also his biggest popular success. He began them in 1967 with the "Die-Cuts" and he continued to paint them until the 16th series in 1976. Although, Norm created no new art for "Wackies" after 1978, the manufacturers continued to repackage Norm's artworks in various formats, even releasing some previously unreleased artworks, but the last Topps product with Norm's art was the Wacky Can Labels in 1980.

== Personal life ==
Saunders married Ellene Politis in 1947. Their daughter, Zina Saunders, is also an illustrator for magazines, books and trading cards. Their son, David Saunders, is a painter-sculptor who designed the "Apple Fence" at New York's LaGuardia Airport.

== Books ==
- Graphic Design Time Line: A Century Of Design Milestones. Heller, Steven; Pettit, Elinor, Allworth Publications, New York, NY, 2000.
- Norman Saunders. Saunders, David, The Illustrated Press, Saint Louis, MO, 2008.
- Pulp Art: Original Cover Paintings For The Great American Pulp Magazines. Lesser, Robert; Reed, Roger, Gramercy Books, New York, NY, 1997.
