= Straight Arrow =

American radio drama and comic series

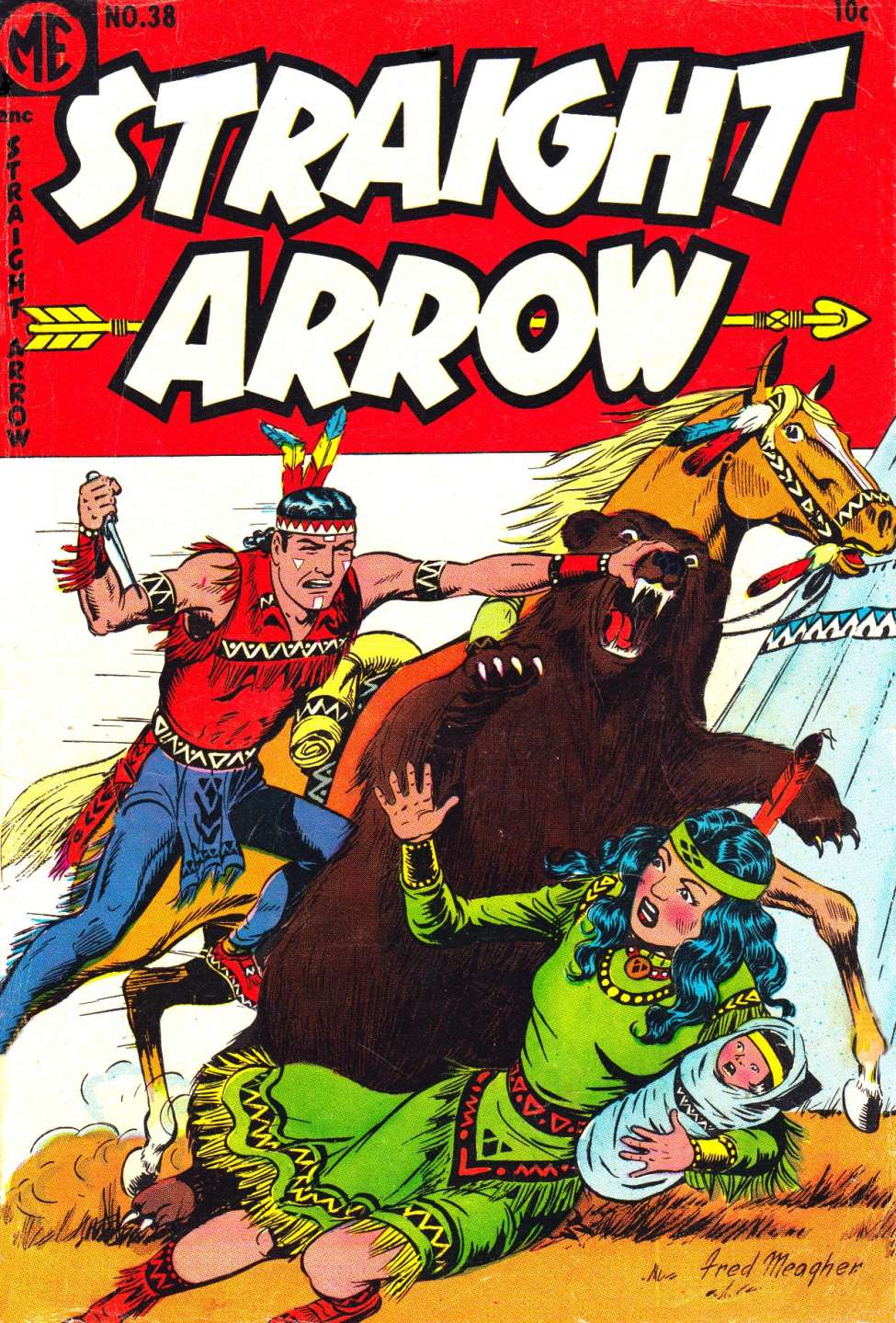
- Straight Arrow #38 (Magazine Enterprises, September / October 1954); art by Fred Meagher

Publication information
- Publisher: (radio) Mutual Broadcasting Company (comics) Magazine Enterprises
- First appearance: (radio) Straight Arrow radio program, 1948 or 1949 (comics) Straight Arrow #1 (Magazine Enterprises, Feb. 1950).
- Created by: Sheldon Stark

In-story information
- Alter ego: Steve Adams
- Team affiliations: Comanche Indians
- Partnerships: Fury (Straight Arrow's palomino)
- Abilities: Skilled hand-to-hand combatant; Unparalleled horseman; Master archer, bowman and marksman

The Straight Arrow radio program is a western adventure series for juveniles which was broadcast, mostly twice weekly in the United States from 1948 through 1951. A total of 292 episodes were aired.

Initially broadcast on the Don Lee Network, on February 2, 1949, the program debuted nationally on the Mutual Broadcasting Network. All the programs were written by Sheldon Stark.

The protagonist, rancher Steve Adams, became the Comanche Indian, the Straight Arrow, when bad people or other dangers threatened. In fact, Adams was a Comanche orphan who had been adopted by the Adams ranching family and later inherited the ranch. His dual identity was known to only one friend, Packy McCloud, Steve Adams's sidekick. Internal evidence places the ranch in the vicinity of the Colorado Rockies in the 1870s. Howard Culver played both Adams and Straight Arrow.

The program was sponsored by Nabisco Shredded Wheat cereal.

A review in the trade publication Variety noted that a distinguishing aspect of the program was its effort "to point up the positive role of the Indian in developing the West."

== Comic book and comic strip ==
Like many other children's programs, this one soon had cross-over presence. The Straight Arrow comic book, published by Magazine Enterprises, came out in February 1950, running 55 issues until 1956. Most of the stories were written by Gardner Fox.

In addition, there were two Straight Arrow comic strips. The first, a daily strip, ran from June 19, 1950, to August 4, 1951. Gardner Fox and Ray Krank wrote the strip, with art by Joe Certa (pencils) and John Belfi (inks). The second, a Sunday strip, ran from September 7 to December 7, 1953. Walter B. Gibson wrote the strip, with art by Fred Meagher.

There were also Straight Arrow collectible cards of Indian crafts inserted in the boxes of Nabisco Shredded Wheat cereal.

The brazilian publisher RGE reprinted many of the Straight Arrow comics, and when the material ended, commissioned original stories drawn by brazilian artists: José Menezes, Walmir Amaral and Evaldo Oliveira. The name of the hero was translated as Flecha Ligeira, and lasted for 120 issues.

In 2019, the rights of the Straight Arrow character including the trademarks were transferred to Education Is Our Buffalo Community Centre, a Canadian based Indigenous organization. Education Is Our Buffalo has an active Indigenous-perspective Facebook group.

== Bibliography ==
- French, Jack; Siege, David S., eds. (October 31, 2013). "Straight Arrow" author William Harper in Radio Rides the Range: A Reference Guide to Western Drama on the Air, 1929–1967. McFarland. pp. 172–176. ISBN 9780786471461.
- Harper, William (2007). Straight Arrow: The Definitive Radio Log and Resource Guide for that Legendary Indian Figure On the Trail of Justice. BearManor Press. ISBN 978-159393-065-3.
