= Civil War News =

Set of collectible trading cards

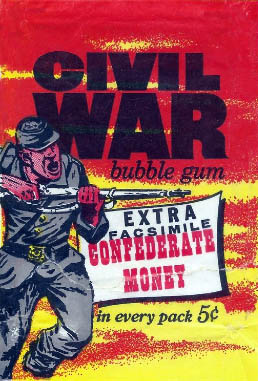
- Card wrapper for the series
- Type: Trading card
- Company: Topps
- Country: United States
- Availability: 1962–1962
- Features: American Civil War

Civil War News was a series of trading cards produced by Topps. The series featured colorful painted artwork and was characterized by vivid colors, graphic depictions of violence, death and blood (base card #21 "Painful Death" being a prime example) and exaggerations of warfare, in a similar tone to Gum Inc.'s 1938 trading card series Horrors of War, which was equally popular.

== Overview ==
The complete series contains 88 cards, including a checklist, and was first printed for the United States market in 1962 to coincide with the centennial of the American Civil War. While the fronts of the cards featuring painted artwork by several artists (mainly Norman Saunders, but also Wally Wood and Bob Powell),the backs were designed as a newspaper, telling the history of the American Civil War through a brief history of a campaign battle or a person presented in a newspaper article-like fashion, complete with a headline.

A similar series with the same artwork was later issued in Canada and A&BC produced a similar series in England, plus a French-language version for sale in France. A Spanish-language version was issued by Topps in 1968, with predominantly different artwork. The cards were issued five to a wax pack and were accompanied by facsimiles of paper money of the Confederate States of America. The original selling price was five cents per package. Topps later issued the cards in cellophane-wrapped strips ("cello packs").

== Checklist ==
=== Confederate money ===
- #01 - $1 Bill - Type One
- #02 - $1 Bill - Type Two
- #03 - $2 Bill - Type One
- #04 - $2 Bill - Type Two
- #05 - $5 Bill - Type One
- #06 - $5 Bill - Type Two
- #07 - $5 Bill - Type Three
- #08 - $10 Bill - Type One
- #09 - $10 Bill - Type Two
- #10 - $20 Bill - Type One
- #11 - $20 Bill - Type Two
- #12 - $20 Bill - Type Three
- #13 - $50 Bill - Type One
- #14 - $50 Bill - Type Two
- #15 - $100 Bill - Type One
- #16 - $500 Bill - Type One
- #17 - $1000 Bill - Type One

== In popular culture ==
A monthly newspaper with the same title as the cards has been published by Historical Publications, Inc. since 1989 in Tunbridge, Vermont.
