= Hold That Woman! =

- Directed by: Sam Newfield (as Sherman Scott)
- Written by: George Bricker (screenplay); William A. Pierce (story); Raymond L. Schrock (story)
- Produced by: Sigmund Neufeld
- Starring: James Dunn; Frances Gifford; George Douglas; Rita La Roy
- Cinematography: Jack Greenhalgh
- Edited by: Holbrook N. Todd
- Music by: David Chudnow
- Distributed by: Producers Releasing Corporation
- Release date: July 15, 1940
- Running time: 67 minutes 63 minutes (Canada, Ontario)
- Country: United States
- Language: English

Hold That Woman! is a 1940 American crime comedy film directed by Sam Newfield and starring the husband-and-wife team of James Dunn and Frances Gifford. The film follows the adventures of a skiptracer and his girlfriend as they attempt to repossess a radio that has not been paid for. Unbeknownst to them, a bag of stolen jewels has been concealed inside the radio by a gang of criminals.

== Plot ==
Bill Lannigan (John Dilson), boss of Skip Tracers Ltd., a skiptrace agency which tracks down people who have not kept up payments on their purchases, gives his agent Jimmy Parker (James Dunn) an ultimatum: he has thirty days to become as successful as his competitor, Miles Hanover (Dave O'Brien), or he will be fired.

Jimmy and his girlfriend Mary Mulvaney (Frances Gifford), the daughter of a policeman, try to repossess a radio from Lulu Driscoll (Rita La Roy), who has not kept up her payments. Jimmy is unaware that stolen jewels have been hidden inside the radio. These jewels were stolen from a famous movie star named Connie Hill (Anna Lisa). Since Jimmy is persistent and forces his way into Lulu's hotel room to take the radio, Lulu calls the police and they arrest both him and Mary and put them in jail.

Meanwhile, Hill's manager, John Lawrence (William Hall), strongly suspects that her fiancé Steve Brady (George Douglas) is involved in her jewel theft. Lawrence and Hill listen in on a conversation between Brady and a man called Duke Jurgens (Paul Bryar) as they talk about a share in the robbery. Lawrence hires Skip Tracers to get the jewels back and Lannigan tells Hanover, Jimmy's competitor, to handle the case.

Released from jail, Jimmy decides on a whim to marry Mary. He puts a down payment on a house and they buy furniture from a widow who is selling the contents of her house cheaply. Jimmy then goes to find Lulu to retrieve both the radio and the jewels but discovers that she's moved.

Meanwhile, Hanover sees Brady being abducted by Jurgens and his gang. The gang goes to Lulu's new residence to find the missing jewels. When they discover Hanover spying on them, they tie him up, while both Lulu and Brady are bound and put in the trunk of a stolen car. As Jurgens and his men rummage through the house to find the jewels, they are interrupted by Jimmy coming for the radio. Jurgens gives Jimmy the radio just to get rid of him. As Jimmy puts the radio in his trunk, the bag of jewels falls out the back. Jimmy recognizes the stolen car parked outside the house as another on his list of skiptrace items, so he takes the stolen car and sends Mary home with their car. Jurgens and his men chase after Jimmy, ending with the police stopping both vehicles. Jimmy's new father-in-law is one of the policemen, and Jimmy shows him he has found the jewels and will get the reward money from the insurance company. He and Mary return to their new home, where they find they were double-crossed by the woman who sold them their furniture: it was all repossessed by skiptracers.

== Cast ==
- James Dunn as Jimmy Parker
- Frances Gifford as Mary Mulvaney
- George Douglas as Steve Brady
- Rita La Roy as Lulu Driscoll
- Martin Spellman as Mike Mulvaney
- Eddie Fetherston as Conroy
- Guy Usher as Officer John Mulvaney
- Paul Bryar as Duke Jurgens
- Edwin Max as Taxi, Jurgens' henchman
- John Dilson as Bill Lannigan
- Dave O'Brien as Miles Hanover
- Anna Lisa as Corrine Hill
- William Hall as Jack Lawrence
- Marie Rice as Mrs. John Mulvaney
- Frank Meredith as Officer Mike
- Art Miles as Kayo

== Production ==
=== Development ===
The film's working title was Skip Tracer. It was adapted from a story by William A. Pierce and Raymond L. Schrock. According to the Hawaii Tribune-Herald, this was the first comedy-drama film to feature a skiptracer as the main character. Director Sam Newfield was listed in the film credits as "Sherman Scott".

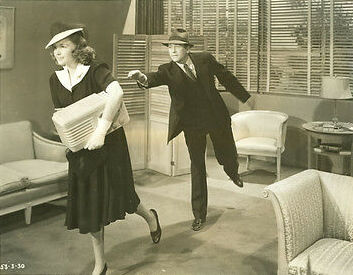
Gifford and Dunn in a promotional photo for the film

=== Casting ===
Hold That Woman! was the second of two films made by the husband-and-wife team of James Dunn and Frances Gifford, who had married in December 1937. They had earlier starred together in Mercy Plane (1939).

=== Filming ===
Production began on May 22, 1940.

== Release ==
The film was released on July 15, 1940. The runtime of the U.S. release is 67 minutes.

== Critical reception ==
The Daily News of New York wrote: "The presentation of 'Hold That Woman,' is better than the production. That the picture has been put together with as little expense as possible is evident but it is invested with humor and clever situations. And the acting is all right".

Dunn's performance earned complimentary reviews. Miller (2015) called the film a "flippant comedy" that was "[n]o great shakes, but if offered Dunn more opportunity to display his impudent charm than did his preceding effort". A brief mention in The Courier-Journal of Louisville, Kentucky, observed: "Dunn with his oldtime fire keeps the proceedings rolling merrily along and as this, too, is out and out melodrama Mr. Dunn is kept quite active". A 1940 review stated: "James Dunn plays the skip tracer in professional style, but is seldom able to transcend the material. Frances Gifford as his fiancee is attractive and makes the most of her role".

== Quotes ==
- "My job's as safe as democracy".

== Sources ==
- Mayer, Geoff (2017). Encyclopedia of American Film Serials. McFarland. ISBN 9781476627199.
- Miller, Don (2015) [1973]. 'B' Movies: An Informal Survey of the American Low-budget Film, 1933-1945. Curtis Books.
- Okuda, Ted (1989). Grand National, Producers Releasing Corporation, and Screen Guild/Lippert: Complete filmographies with studio histories. McFarland. ISBN 978-0-899-50384-4.
- Shull, Michael S. (2015). Hollywood War Films, 1937-1945. McFarland. ISBN 978-1-476-62178-4.
- The Movies and the People Who Make Them. Theatre Patrons, Incorporated. 1940.
