= Gwynne Shipman =

American film actor

- Born: Beulah McDonald; November 8, 1909
- Died: September 11, 2005 (aged 95)
- Occupation: Actress
- Years active: 1934–49
- Spouse: Barry Shipman
- Children: 3, including Nina Shipman

Gwynne Shipman (born Beulah McDonald; November 8, 1909 – September 11, 2005) was an American film actress. She was married to the screenwriter Barry Shipman. They had a daughter Nina, who became an actress, and twin sons, Michael and Noel.

Shipman was an actress and dancer at Paramount Studios until 1949. Her film debut came in Trail Dust (1936).

In 1935, Shipman broke her collarbone and two ribs when a horse threw her.

== Selected filmography ==
- Hopalong Cassidy Returns (1936)
- Trail Dust (1936)
- Battle of Greed (1937)
- Every Girl Should Be Married (1948)
- The Lawton Story (1949)

== Bibliography ==
- Pitts, Michael R. Western Movies: A Guide to 5,105 Feature Films. McFarland, 2012.
