= Hills of Old Wyoming =

1937 film by Nate Watt

- Directed by: Nate Watt
- Screenplay by: Maurice Geraghty
- Based on: The Round-Up; 1933 novel by Clarence E. Mulford
- Produced by: Harry Sherman
- Starring: William Boyd; George "Gabby" Hayes; Morris Ankrum; Russell Hayden; Gail Sheridan; John Beach; Clara Kimball Young
- Cinematography: Archie Stout
- Edited by: Robert B. Warwick Jr.
- Music by: Lee Zahler
- Production company: Paramount Pictures
- Distributed by: Paramount Pictures
- Release date: April 16, 1937
- Running time: 78 minutes
- Country: United States
- Language: English

Hills of Old Wyoming is a 1937 American Western film directed by Nate Watt and written by Maurice Geraghty, the 10th film of the 66 Hopalong Cassidy movies. The film stars William Boyd, George "Gabby" Hayes, Morris Ankrum, Russell Hayden, Gail Sheridan, John Beach and Clara Kimball Young, Russell Hayden makes his first (of 27 consecutive) appearances. The film was released on April 16, 1937, by Paramount Pictures.

== Plot ==
An evil deputy is using Indian mixed-blood individuals to rustle cattle. This causes trouble between the cattlemen and the Indians. Hoppy, Windy and Lucky see that justice is served. Songs abound.

== Cast ==
- William Boyd as Hopalong Cassidy
- George "Gabby" Hayes as Windy Halliday
- Morris Ankrum as Andrews
- Russell Hayden as Lucky Jenkins
- Gail Sheridan as Alice Hutchins
- John Beach as Rancher Saunders
- Clara Kimball Young as Ma Hutchins
- Earle Hodgins as Thompson
- Steve Clemente as Henchman Lone Eagle
- Chief John Big Tree as Chief Big Tree
- George Chesebro as Henchman Peterson
- Paul Gustine as Henchman Daniels
- Leo J. McMahon as Cowhand Steve
- John Powers as Smiley the Cook
