= Rita La Roy =

American actress (1901–1993)

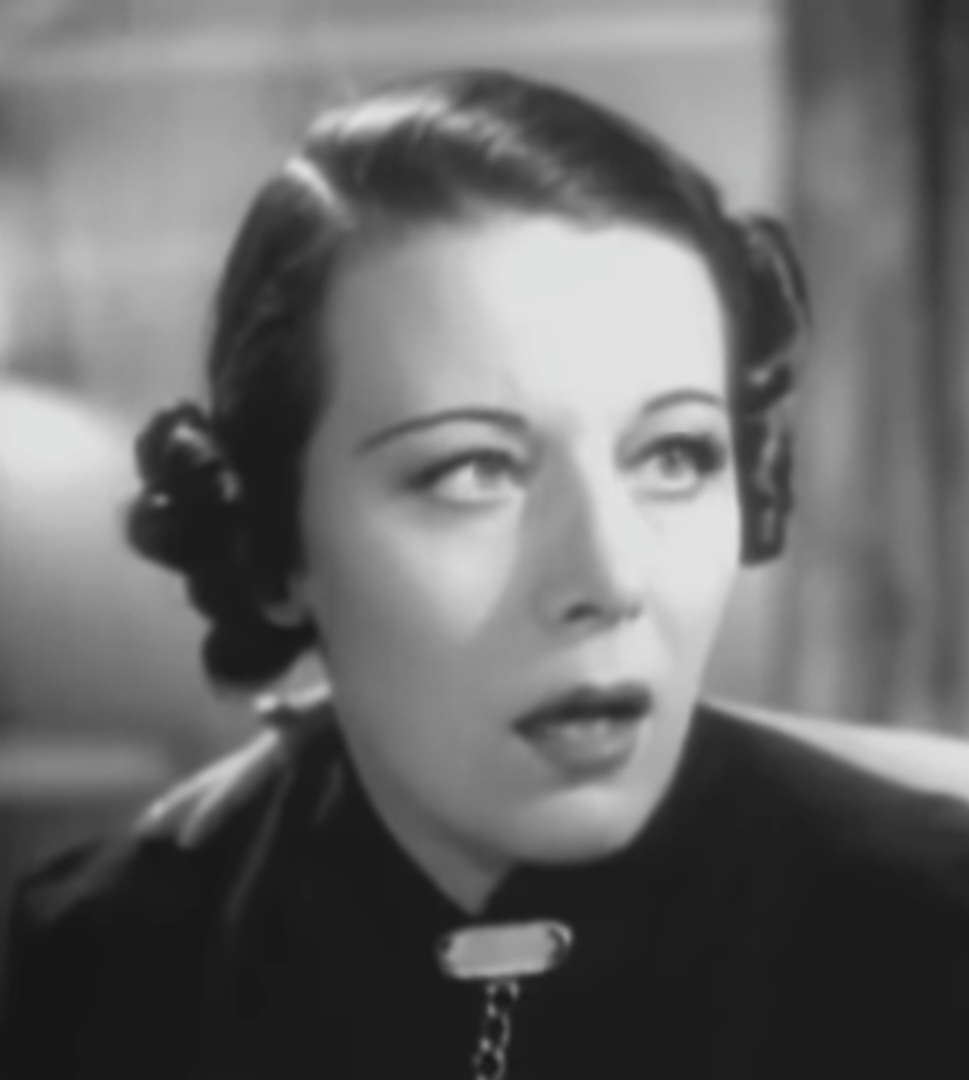
- La Roy in The Mandarin Mystery (1936)
- Born: Ina La Roi Stuart; October 2, 1901; Bonners Ferry, Idaho, U.S.
- Died: February 18, 1993 (aged 91); Chula Vista, California, U.S.
- Occupation: Actress
- Years active: 1929–1951
- Spouse(s): Ben Hershfield (m. 1931; div. 1933) A.G. Foley (m. 1942): Stratford Corbett (m. c. 1947; died 1956)
- Children: 1

Rita La Roy (born Ina La Roi Stuart; October 2, 1901 – February 18, 1993) was an American actress and dancer, beginning her career in 1929, and having her last significant role in 1940.

== Early life ==
While the studio publicity machine claimed she had been born in Paris, France, she was actually born in the small town of Bonners Ferry, Idaho in 1901. Her early years saw her work as both a dress designer and a stock company actress, before moving onto vaudeville, where she became a dancer.

Performing on the Pantages and Orpheum theater circuits, she was known for erotic acts, which included dances such as the "frog dance", the "peacock dance" and the "cobra dance" in which her feet and legs were tied together under a stylized snakeskin so that she danced by undulating her torso.

== Career ==
La Roy appeared in over 50 films, the best known of which was Blonde Venus, which starred Marlene Dietrich. After her acting career, she had a school for models in Hollywood.

== Film career ==
In 1929, she made her film debut in The Delightful Rogue, starring opposite matinee idol Rod La Rocque.

Over the next several years, working as part of the RKO Radio Pictures stable, she appeared in both starring and supporting roles. While her final significant role was in the 1940 comedy-mystery Hold That Woman!, she had several small roles during the 1940s, including in such films as Sergeant York and You're My Everything.

== Post-film life ==
After retiring from film, for the most part, in the early 1940s, she ran the Rita La Roy Modeling School and Agency. She later wrote and produced her own shows for the local television station in Los Angeles, KTLA. For one of those programs she won an Emmy in 1948. She died of pneumonia in Chula Vista, California in 1993, aged 91.

== Personal life ==
La Roy married agent Ben Hershfield on September 27, 1931. They separated in September 1933, and he sued for divorce in October 1933. In 1942 La Roy married horse trainer A. G. Foley. By 1947, she was in a relationship with the second husband of June Miller, insurance salesman Stratford Corbett. La Roy was married to Corbett at the time of his death in 1956.

== Filmography ==
Title	Year	Role	Notes
Masquerade	1929	Girl	
The Love Trap	1929	Mary Harrington	
The Delightful Rogue	1929	Nydra	
Dynamite	1929	Good Mixer	Uncredited
Lilies of the Field	1930	Florette	
Lovin' the Ladies	1930	Louise Endicott	
Midnight Mystery	1930	Madeline Austen	
Conspiracy	1930	Nita Strong	
Leathernecking	1930	Fortune Teller	
Check and Double Check	1930	Elinor Crawford	
Sin Takes a Holiday	1930	Grace Lawrence	
Playthings of Hollywood	1930	Virginia King	
A Holy Terror	1931	Kitty Carroll	
Traveling Husbands	1931	Daisy	
The Gay Diplomat	1931	Natalie	
Left Over Ladies	1931	Vera Lane	
The Yellow Ticket	1931	Fania Rubinstein	
The Secret Witness	1931	Mrs. Sylvia Folsom	Uncredited
Amateur Daddy	1932	Lottie Pelgram	
So Big	1932	Paula Storm	Uncredited
While Paris Sleeps	1932	Fifi	
Sinners in the Sun	1932	Lil	
Hollywood Speaks	1932	Millie Coreen	
Bachelor's Affairs	1932	Sonya Denton	
The Honor of the Press	1932	Daisy Tellem	
Blonde Venus	1932	Taxi Belle Hooper	
Hot Saturday	1932	Camille	
From Hell to Heaven	1933	Elsie Ruby	
I've Got Your Number	1934	Sassy Call Girl	Uncredited
Whirlpool	1934	Thelma	
One Is Guilty	1934	Lola Deveroux	
Name the Woman	1934	Marie Denton	
Fugitive Lady	1934	Sylvia Brooks	
After Office Hours	1935	Branch's Society Girlfriend	Uncredited
Hollywood Boulevard	1936	Nella	
The Mandarin Mystery	1936	Martha Kirk	
Lady from Nowhere	1936	Mabel Donner	
Find the Witness	1937	Rita Calmette	
King of Gamblers	1937	Woman at table	Uncredited
The Hit Parade	1937	Woman ex-convict	Uncredited
Mountain Music	1937	Mrs. Hamilton B. Lovelace	
Flight from Glory	1937	Molly	
Dangerous to Know	1938	Mrs. Barnett	Uncredited
Condemned Women	1938	Cora	
Border G-Man	1938	Mrs. Rita Browning	
Smashing the Rackets	1938	Reluctant Witness	Uncredited
Fixer Dugan	1939	Patricia 'Pat' O'Connell	
Hold That Woman!	1940	Lulu Driscoll	
Sergeant York	1941	Saloon Girl	Uncredited
Hangmen Also Die!	1943	Girl	Uncredited
You're My Everything	1949	Fashion Editor	Uncredited
