= Mariners of the Sky =

1936 film by Nate Watt

- Title card
- Directed by: Nate Watt
- Written by: Mildred Cram (story); Albert DeMond (screenplay); Olive Cooper (screenplay); Marcus Goodrich (screenplay); Claire Church (additional dialogue)
- Produced by: Nat Levine (producer); Burt Kelly (associate producer)
- Starring: William Gargan; Claire Dodd; Douglas Fowley
- Cinematography: Jack A. Marta; Ernest Miller
- Edited by: Richard Fantl
- Music by: Harry Grey
- Production company: Republic Pictures Corp.
- Distributed by: Republic Pictures Corp.
- Release date: June 2, 1936
- Running time: 68 minutes
- Country: United States
- Language: English

Mariners of the Sky (also known as Navy Born) is a 1936 American comedy-drama film directed and produced by Nate Watt, in his directorial debut. The film stars William Gargan, Claire Dodd and Douglas Fowley. Filmed with the cooperation of the U.S. Navy, it was a mild recruiting film in an era when the United States military was gearing up for a future war. (Note: Most reference sources list the film as Navy Born.)

== Plot ==
U.S. navy pilot Tex Jones (Addison Randall) is stationed on an aircraft carrier and learns that he is a father. He shares the news with his best pals and fellow pilots, "Red" Furness (William Gargan), Steve Bassett (Douglas Fowley) and Bill Lyons (William Newell). On reaching Naval Base San Diego, the squadron's home port, Tex learns his wife Mary had died. While overwhelmed with grief, Tex wants to look after his son as a navy child, but Mary's sister, Bernice Farrington (Claire Dodd) is intent on taking the baby away.

Tex asks Red to take care of "The Admiral", the name he and Red have tagged the boy, but, when he is driving to the hospital to say goodbye to his wife, he is in a serious car accident. With his dying breath, Tex pledges to his friend Red as the baby's guardian. While Red has cleverly hidden the baby in his bachelor quarters, Bernice, her mother (Claudia Coleman) and their attorney, Mr. Strickland (Douglas Wood), visit Red's commanding officer, Admiral Kingston (George Irving), and persuade him to take them to Red's quarters.

Alerted by Kingston, Red hides the evidence of the baby being there and Bill rushes out to find Aunt Minnie (Georgia Caine). While Steve passes the baby through the window to Aunt Minnie, Bernice senses she is out-maneuvered, but is undeterred. Even though she is a pilot, Bernice asks Red for flying lessons, and tries to use the flight as a means of getting information as to her nephew's whereabouts. She also elicits her friend, Daphne Roth (Dorothy Tree) to also see Steve, and try to pump him for the baby's location.

Red and Bernice fight over the controls on her flight, and Red has to resort to knocking her out. Meanwhile, Daphne has come through, but Bernice learns why Red is so determined to raise Tex's son as a navy man, and now regrets her machinations. When the Farringtons recover the baby, an angry Red refuses to listen to Bernice's apologies.

A week later, as Red is about to ship out, he decides to see the little boy one last time but discovers the baby is in the hospital. Gangster Joe Vezie (Paul Fix), convinced that the Admiral is his son, has taken him away, heading for the Canadian border. Red takes off in a Navy aircraft in pursuit, and even though Admiral Kingston has to consider him AWOL, he orders six fighter aircraft to follow Red.

When he catches up with Vezie, Red persuades the gangster that he has the wrong baby. Coming back to base, everyone assembles in Admiral Kingston's office, where he agrees to not punish Red. Since he was "Navy born", Bernice and Red decide to marry and raise the Admiral together, keeping with Tex's final wishes.

== Cast ==
- William Gargan as Lt. "Red" Furness
- Claire Dodd as Bernice Farrington
- Douglas Fowley as Lt. Steve Bassett
- George Irving as Adm. Kingston
- Dorothy Tree as Daphne Roth
- William Newell as Lt. Bill Lyons
- Addison Randall as Lt. Tex Jones
- Georgia Caine as Aunt Minnie
- Claudia Coleman as Mrs. Farrington
- Douglas Wood as Mr. Strickland
- Paul Fix as Joe Vezie
- Hooper Atchley as Seeley

== Production ==
The aircraft carrier that appeared at the start of Mariners of the Sky is the USS Lexington (CV-2) and "heavy cruiser" USS Indianapolis (CA-35), shown during a naval exercise. The aircraft carrier, however. is identified as the USS Saratoga (CV-3). Principal photography was completed in April 1936.

The pilots of VF-1 flying Boeing F4B fighter aircraft were featured in the film. Navy cooperation was necessary for the flying sequences although the navy ships at sea came from stock footage. A Monocoupe 90 (NC192K) is also used as a training aircraft in the film.

Paul Gustine employed by the Navy Office, was assigned to Mariners of the Sky. (Note: Gustine, both an actor and pilot, flew for Hollywood stunt pilot Paul Mantz.)

== Reception ==
Mariners of the Sky premiered at the Fairfax Theater in Los Angeles on May 27, 1936, to generally favorable reviews. The review in Variety noted that the film was "... a pleasing little comedy drama against a Navy air corps background."
