= Nate Watt =

American film director

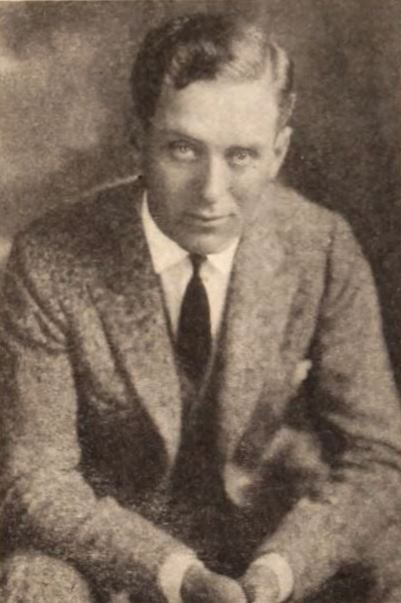
- From a 1920 magazine
- Born: Nathan Watt; April 6, 1889; Denver, Colorado, United States
- Died: May 26, 1968 (aged 79); Los Angeles, California, United States
- Occupation: Film director
- Years active: 1916–1961

Nathan Watt (April 6, 1889 – May 26, 1968) was an American film director. He directed 30 films between 1916 and 1961.

== Filmography ==
- The Torch Bearer (1916) (actor)
- Persistent Percival (1916, short)
- Cooking His Goose (1916, short)
- The Man Who Would Not Die (1916)
- The Galloping Devil (1920)
- What Women Love (as Nate C. Watt) (1920)
- Three Good Pals (1921, short)
- The Raiders (1921)
- The Hunger of the Blood (1921)
- Bad Breaks (1926, short)
- Pound Foolish (1926, short)
- All Quiet on the Western Front (1930; assistant director)
- High Spirits (1927, short)
- Dear Season (1927, short)
- Hot Cookies (1927, short)
- Air Maniacs (1933, short)
- Hopalong Cassidy Returns (1936)
- Trail Dust (1936)
- Mariners of the Sky/Navy Born (1936)
- Carnival Queen (1937)
- Rustlers' Valley (1937)
- North of the Rio Grande (1937)
- Hills of Old Wyoming (1937)
- Borderland (1937)
- Three Men in a Tub (1938, short)
- The Awful Tooth (1938, short)
- Law of the Pampas (1939)
- Oklahoma Renegades (1940)
- Frontier Vengeance (1940)
- Cheyenne Cowboy (1949, short)
- Six-Gun Music (1949, short)
- Fiend of Dope Island (1961)
