= Tarzan Triumphs =

1943 film by Wilhelm Thiele

- Directed by: Wilhelm Thiele
- Written by: Carroll Young (story and screenplay); Roy Chanslor (screenplay)
- Based on: Characters created by Edgar Rice Burroughs
- Produced by: Sol Lesser (exec. producer); Wilhelm Thiele (uncredited assoc. producer)
- Starring: Johnny Weissmuller; Johnny Sheffield; Frances Gifford; Stanley Ridges
- Cinematography: Harry J. Wild
- Edited by: Harry Horner
- Music by: Paul Sawtell
- Distributed by: RKO Pictures
- Release date: February 19, 1943
- Running time: 76 minutes
- Country: United States
- Language: English
- Box office: $1.5 million (US rentals)

Tarzan Triumphs is a 1943 adventure film in which Tarzan fights the Germans during World War II. Johnny Weissmuller had previously portrayed the Edgar Rice Burroughs character in six films with Metro-Goldwyn-Mayer, but this was his first with the producer Sol Lesser at RKO Pictures. Lesser had previously produced Tarzan the Fearless and Tarzan's Revenge.

Weissmuller was reunited with two of his three co-stars from several of the earlier films; Johnny Sheffield and Cheeta, but Maureen O'Sullivan was unable to reprise her role as Jane because the franchise switched from MGM to RKO, and O'Sullivan was an MGM contract player. Instead, Frances Gifford played the princess of the lost city of Palandrya, which is conquered by Germans.

== Plot ==
During World War II, Tarzan and his son, Boy, are living on the Great Escarpment, though Jane has returned to the United Kingdom to tend to her sick mother. Jane's letter to Tarzan and Boy describes the ongoing struggle against Nazi Germany. Searching for raw materials in Sub-Saharan Africa to help Germany's cause, a small force of German paratroopers lands and takes over the lost city of "Palandrya" as an advance base and to enslave its people. Lieutenant Schmidt is separated from the other paratroopers, but has a short wave radio enabling him to contact his superiors in Berlin. Schmidt convalesces at Tarzan's camp, telling Tarzan he is English.

Zandra escapes after the Germans kill her brother Achmet. Finding Tarzan, she discloses the Germans' presence, and he concludes Schmidt is a German. Tarzan's chimpanzee, Cheetah, with an elephant's assistance, pushes Schmidt off a cliff and he falls to his death. Zandra tries to convince Tarzan to help her people, but Tarzan ignores her, having previously said, "Jungle people fight to live, civilized people live to fight." Zandra plans to return home, but Tarzan stops her.

Several Germans search Tarzan's camp for a radio. They ultimately kidnap Boy, and they presume Tarzan is dead after shooting him out of a tree. Uninjured and hidden from the Germans by Cheetah's monkey brigade, an angry Tarzan shouts, "Now Tarzan make war!" Tarzan infiltrates the lost city, destroying a machine gun, and kills several Germans. He is temporarily captured, joining Zandra and Boy, but is freed by Cheetah and defeats the German invaders with his knife and an elephant blitzkrieg.

In the final scene, Cheetah speaks into the radio; the Germans in Berlin mistake Cheetah's sounds for the rants of Adolf Hitler.

== Cast ==
- Johnny Weissmuller as Tarzan
- Johnny Sheffield as Boy
- Frances Gifford as Zandra
- Stanley Ridges as Colonel Von Reichart
- Sig Ruman as Sergeant
- Philip Van Zandt as Captain Bausch
- Rex Williams as Lieutenant Reinhardt Schmidt
- Pedro de Cordoba as Oman, the Patriarch
- Sven Hugo Borg as Heinz
- Stanley Brown as Achmet
- George Lynn as Nazi Pilot (uncredited)
- Otto Reichow as Grüber (uncredited)
- Wilhelm von Brincken as General Hoffman in Berlin (uncredited)

== Production ==
The U.S. State Department informed Sol Lesser that a Tarzan film would be an ideal way to spread the message of democracy's battle against fascism to the American public. Lesser's first RKO Tarzan film had made the Ape Man a symbol of American isolationism. The film was the highest grossing of Lesser's Tarzan films.

Unlike previous Tarzan films, the natives are played by whites in South Sea Island costume rather than the black Africans of the MGM films. This use of non-blacks as natives continued for several other Tarzan films in the 1940s.

The film made a profit of $208,000.

== Critical reception ==
A review of the film in Variety described it as "virtually all jungle stuff" with a "good portion of stock animal shots," adding that "Weissmuller and Sheffield run around as usual without necessity of displaying much acting ability." Writing in The New York Times, critic Bosley Crowther reported that the film "is pretty much of a piece with the previous Tarzan fables" with "the usual tree-top swinging, animal cut-ups and yee-owling through the woods," noting that "it may please a lot of people to see Tarzan banging Nazis right and left. But the jest is decidedly hollow" and "Cheta the Chimp still has the best brain in the film."
