= Gail Sheridan =

American film actress

- Shirley Mingins (later known as Gail Sheridan), from a 1934 newspaper
- Born: Shirley Gail Mingins; January 11, 1916; Seattle, Washington, U.S.
- Died: September 17, 1982 (aged 66); Chevy Chase, Maryland, U.S.
- Other names: Shirley Nibley, Gail Katcher, Shirley Katcher
- Occupation: Actress
- Years active: 1936-1937
- Spouse(s): Alexander Sloan Nibley (1938-1942) (divorced) (1 child); David Abraham Katcher (1947-1982) (her death) (1 child)

Gail Sheridan (January 11, 1916, Seattle, Washington – September 17, 1982, Chevy Chase, Maryland) was an American film actress and dancer in the 1930s.

== Early life ==
Gail Sheridan was born Shirley Gail Mingins in Seattle and raised in Berkeley and San Francisco, the daughter of Royall Wood Mingins and Fay Mitchell Kear Mingins. Her father was a court reporter. She had a sister, June. She studied drama with Robert Warwick, ballet with Theodore Kosloff and Spanish dance with Elisa Cansino as a young woman.

== Career ==
Sheridan was named one of the twelve Goldwyn Girls in 1935, alongside Anya Taranda and Jinx Falkenburg. She was a contract player at Paramount Pictures, best known for her role in the 1930s westerns Hopalong Cassidy Returns (1936) and Hills of Old Wyoming (1937). She starred opposite actor William Boyd in both pictures. Her other credits include Three Married Men (1936), Strike Me Pink (1936, as one of the Goldwyn Girls), Florida Special (1936) and Poppy (1936).

== Personal life ==
Sheridan was married twice. Her first husband was screenwriter Alexander Sloan Nibley; they married in 1938 and divorced in 1942. They had a son, Philip Royall. Her second husband was scientist and Physics Today editor David Abraham Katcher; they married in 1947, and had a daughter, Katherine (later Kravik). Sheridan died from cancer in 1982, at the age of 66, in Chevy Chase, Maryland.
