= Trail Dust =

1936 film by Nate Watt

- Directed by: Nate Watt
- Screenplay by: Al Martin
- Based on: Trail Dust; 1934 novel by Clarence E. Mulford
- Produced by: Harry Sherman
- Starring: William Boyd; James Ellison; George "Gabby" Hayes; Morris Ankrum; Gwynne Shipman; Britt Wood; Dick Dickson
- Cinematography: Archie Stout
- Edited by: Robert B. Warwick Jr.
- Music by: Charles Bradshaw
- Production company: Paramount Pictures
- Distributed by: Paramount Pictures
- Release date: December 11, 1936
- Running time: 77 minutes
- Country: United States
- Language: English

Trail Dust is a 1936 American Western film directed by Nate Watt, written by Al Martin, and starring William Boyd, James Ellison, George "Gabby" Hayes, Morris Ankrum, Gwynne Shipman, Britt Wood and Dick Dickson. It was released on December 11, 1936, by Paramount Pictures.

== Cast ==
- William Boyd as Hopalong Cassidy
- James Ellison as Johnny Nelson
- George "Gabby" Hayes as Windy Halliday
- Morris Ankrum as Tex Anderson
- Gwynne Shipman as Beth Clark
- Britt Wood as Lanky
- Dick Dickson as Waggoner
- Earl Askam as Red
- Al Bridge as Babson
- John Beach as Hank
- Ted Adams as Joe Wilson
- T.J. Halligan as Skinny
- Dan Wolheim as Henchman Borden
- Harold Daniels as Lewis
- Emmett Daly as George
- Al St. John as Henchman Al
- Kenneth Harlan as Bowman
- George Chesebro as Saunders
- Leo J. McMahon as Cowhand Bob
- John Elliott as John Clark

== Production ==
The railroad scenes were filmed on the Sierra Railroad in Tuolumne County, California.
