= Hopalong Cassidy Returns =

1936 film by Nate Watt

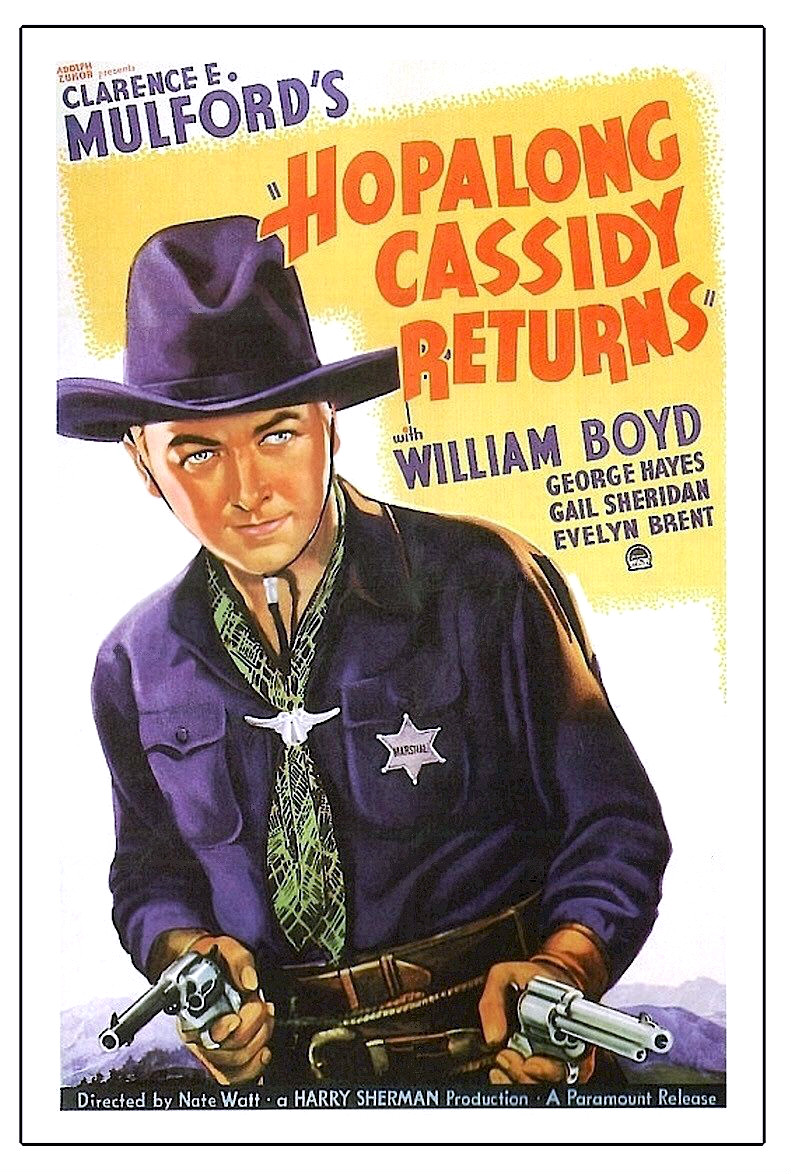
- Theatrical release poster
- Directed by: Nate Watt
- Written by: Harrison Jacobs; Clarence E. Mulford
- Produced by: Harry Sherman
- Starring: William Boyd; George 'Gabby' Hayes; Gail Sheridan
- Cinematography: Archie Stout
- Edited by: Robert B. Warwick Jr.
- Distributed by: Paramount Pictures
- Release date: October 16, 1936
- Running time: 74 minutes
- Country: United States
- Language: English

Hopalong Cassidy Returns (1936) is a Western film sequel starring William Boyd, the seventh of the "Hopalong Cassidy" westerns.

This was the first of 13 Hopalong Cassidy movies in which Morris Ankrum starred with William Boyd. He also was in two Hopalong Cassidy TV productions, Black Waters (1952) and The Black Sombrero (1954).

== Plot ==
Town marshal Hopalong Cassidy investigates the murder of a gold miner who was killed before he could file his claim.

== Cast ==
- William Boyd as Hopalong Cassidy
- George 'Gabby' Hayes as Windy Haliday
- Gail Sheridan as Mary Saunders
- Evelyn Brent as Lilli Marsh
- Morris Ankrum as Blackie Felton
- William Janney as Buddy Cassidy
- Irving Bacon as Peg Leg Holden

== Reception ==
This is the highest-rated film in the Hopalong Cassidy series starring Boyd on the IMDb website.
