= Sky Commando =

1953 film by Fred F. Sears

- Film poster
- Directed by: Fred F. Sears
- Written by: Samuel Newman (screenplay and story); William Sackheim; Arthur Orlof
- Produced by: Sam Katzman
- Starring: Dan Duryea; Frances Gifford; Mike Connors as Touch Conners
- Cinematography: Lester H. White
- Edited by: Edwin Bryant
- Music by: Ross DiMaggio (credited as Ross Di Maggio)
- Production companies: Clover Productions, Inc.
- Distributed by: Columbia Pictures
- Release date: August 21, 1953
- Running time: 69 minutes
- Country: United States
- Language: English

Sky Commando is a 1953 American war film released by Columbia Pictures, directed by Fred F. Sears and starring Dan Duryea, Frances Gifford and Mike Connors (credited as "Touch Conners"). The Cold War period provides the background, although the plot concerns a flashback to World War II aerial action.

Sky Commando was the last major film feature for Frances Gifford as her postwar career was affected by serious personal problems. The film was one of Connors' first, having made his debut in Sudden Fear (1952); he had previously appeared in Sears' The 49th Man, earlier in 1953.

== Plot ==
During the Korean War, while American Air Force pilots Lt. John Willard (William Bryant) and his brother Frank (Dick Paxton) are flying a routine reconnaissance mission, their commanding officer, Col. Ed Wyatt (Dan Duryea) orders them to bomb an enemy position. Frank's aircraft is shot down, and John returns to confront his commander over the reason for the dangerous mission. Wyatt's executive officer, Maj. Scott (Michael Fox) stops him and relates a story about Wyatt's career during World War II.

In the 8th Air Force, Wyatt commanded a bomber group whose reconnaissance missions provided valuable information for future bombing raids. War correspondent Jo McWethy (Frances Gifford) who was assigned to cover Wyatt's group, wanted to know the truth about his reputation for being a hard-driving and unsympathetic commanding officer. His pilots held Wyatt responsible for the death of his co-pilot during a dangerous mission and new co-pilot, Lt. Hobson "Hobbie" Lee (Mike Connors), becomes the replacement. During a "milk-run", Wyatt changed the mission to photograph heavily defended Bremen. German anti-aircraft batteries shot down several fighter escorts and badly damaged Wyatt's aircraft, killing three of his crew. Nursing the stricken bomber back home, Wyatt made the decision to dump everything to save the aircraft and its important film. Hobbie and waist-gunner Danny Nelson (Freeman Morse) had to ditch the bodies of the dead crew and parachute out. Wyatt then flew back with the injured navigator aboard.

During his recuperation, Hobbie met Jo who was also unsure about Wyatt's decisions and when Hobbie followed Wyatt to North Africa, he was seeking confirmation that his commander was a ruthless martinet. During a dangerous mission over Romanian oil fields, Wyatt's bomber was shot down. Although five of the crew were saved, gunner Danny Nelson was killed. With the aid of partisans, Hobbie reconciled with the badly wounded Wyatt, and managed to convey the crucial roll of film safely back to England.

When Scott concludes his story, Lt. Willard realizes that Wyatt does care for his men. A wire the next day informs him that his brother is still alive and has been rescued.

== Cast ==
As credited, with screen roles identified:

- Dan Duryea as Colonel Ed (E.D.) Wyatt
- Frances Gifford as Jo McWethy
- Mike Connors as Lieutenant Hobson "Hobbie" Lee (credited as "Touch Conners")
- Michael Fox as Major Scott
- William Bryant as Lieutenant John "Johnny" Willand (listed as Will R. Klein)
- Freeman Morse as Danny Nelson
- Dick Paxton as Captain Frank Willard
- Selmer Jackson as General Carson
- Dick Lerner as "Jorgy"
- Morris Ankrum as General W.R. Combs (Note: Notable actors in uncredited roles include Tommy Farrell as a pilot, Bert Stevens as an air force officer and Paul McGuire as Major Daly, albeit uncredited.)

A predominance of stock footage was used in Sky Commando.

== Production ==
Sky Commando was a typical Fred F. Sears actioner, combining an array of stock footage with live action. As one of the many features that Sears helmed in a very short period, the film was a "B" feature, although it did star Duryea, Gifford and future TV star Mike Connors. With principal photography done over an eight-day span, March 16–23, 1953, most of the production work that remained involved merging the stock combat footage of USAF and USAAF action. The preponderance of stock footage was not always carefully integrated; Consolidated B-24 Liberator, Boeing B-17 Flying Fortress, North American B-25 Mitchell, North American F-86 Sabre and Lockheed F-80 Shooting Star footage was, at times, jarringly spliced together, with a view of a bomber changing dramatically to a different aircraft. Most of the action in the cockpit between Conners and Duryea was filmed in a B-25 bomber cockpit.

In an interview with Tom Weaver, Mike Connors recalled they were told that the last two days shooting of their six-day filming schedule was technically unsuitable. Connors and Duryea assumed they would make money with two more days shooting, but producer Sam Katzman informed the pair that he made their re shooting the film unnecessary by using more aircraft stock footage.

== Reception ==
Like most of Fred F. Sears' work, with its poor production values and stagey plot, Sky Commando was not well received. Reviewer Hal Erickson, in a latter day critique, observed that the film was notable for presenting Duryea in a sympathetic role, and for the presence of former headliner Frances Gifford.
