= Marriage Is a Private Affair =

1944 film by Robert Zigler Leonard

Marriage is a Private Affair
- Directed by: Robert Z. Leonard
- Screenplay by: David Hertz; Lenore J. Coffee; Michael Kanin (uncredited); Ring Lardner, Jr. (uncredited)
- Based on: Marriage Is a Private Affair; 1941 novel by Judith Kelly
- Produced by: Pandro S. Berman
- Starring: Lana Turner; Frances Gifford; James Craig
- Cinematography: Ray June; Harold Rosson (uncredited)
- Edited by: George White
- Music by: Bronislau Kaper
- Distributed by: Metro-Goldwyn-Mayer
- Release date: August 23, 1944
- Running time: 116 minutes
- Country: United States
- Language: English
- Budget: $1,508,000
- Box office: $2,649,000

Marriage is a Private Affair is a 1944 war-comedy film, directed by Robert Z. Leonard, based on the novel Marriage Is a Private Affair (1941) by Judith Kelly. It stars Lana Turner, Frances Gifford and James Craig.

== Plot ==
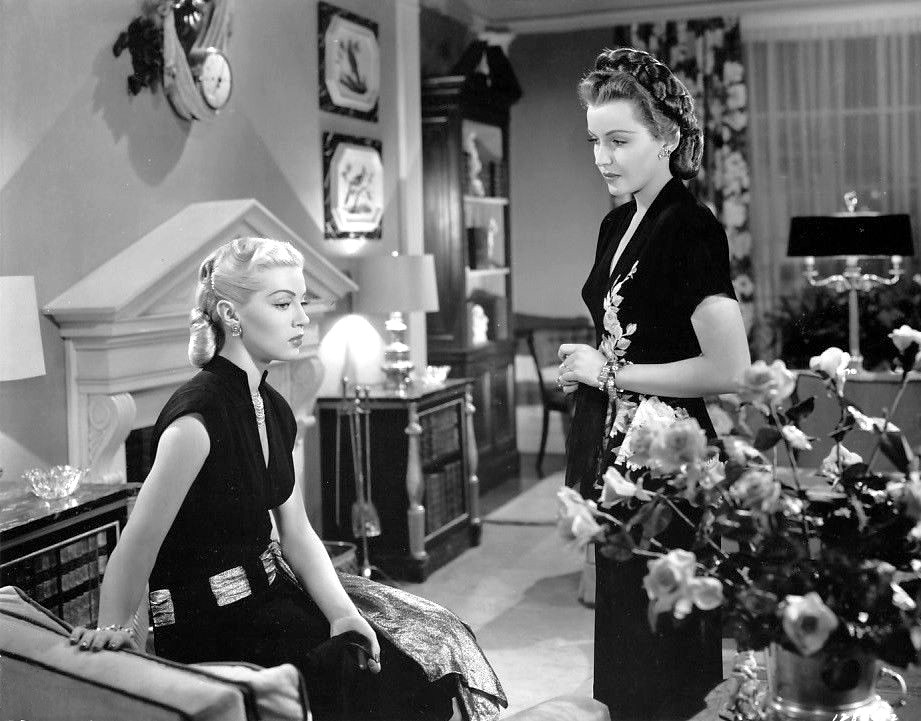
Turner and Gifford

During World War II Theo has many boyfriends from the officers' club in New York City, who want to marry her. Her mother, Mrs. Selworth, has been married many times. Without much thought, Theo accepts a proposal of marriage from Tom West, an Air Corps lieutenant, about to ship out, not knowing if he'll come back. After the honeymoon, Tom's father dies, a defense contractor making lenses for bomber sights, and the War Industries Board furloughs Tom from shipping out with the United States Army Air Corps (predecessor to the United States Air Force), and orders him to take over the lens production operation. Theo has a baby, hates the idea of being matronly, and considers a return to being one of the party girls at the O club. One of Tom's business partners, Joe Murdock, is an alcoholic, constantly disappearing, which requires Tom to work to fill in for him with defense contracts, making bomber lenses for the war effort. Theo turns to her dashing old flame, Major Lancing. To decide what she wants to do with her baby and her life, Theo must learn to grow up, and deal with the failings of those around her, and resist following their bad example.

== Cast ==
- Lana Turner: Theo Scofield West
- James Craig: Miles Lancing
- John Hodiak: Lt. Tom Cochrane West
- Frances Gifford: Sissy Mortimer
- Hugh Marlowe: Joseph I. Murdock
- Natalie Schafer: Mrs. Irene Selworth
- Keenan Wynn: Major Bob Wilton
- Herbert Rudley: Ted Mortimer
- Paul Cavanagh: Mr. Selworth
- Morris Ankrum: Mr. Ed Scofield
- Jane Green: Martha
- Tom Drake: Bill Rice
- Shirley Patterson: Mary Saunders
- Neal Dodd: Minister
- Rhea Mitchell: Nurse
- Nana Bryant: Nurse
- Cecilia Callejo: Señora Guizman
- Virginia Brissac: Mrs. Courtland West
- Byron Foulger: Ned Bolton
- Addison Richards: Colonel Ryder
- Gino Corrado: Wedding Party Guest
- Alexander D'Arcy: Mr. Garby

== Reception ==
According to Hollywood Reporter news items, Marriage Is a Private Affair was the first Hollywood film to have a world premiere specifically for U.S. combat forces overseas. Lana Turner made a personal appearance at the premiere, which modern sources note took place on September 23, 1944 at a theater in Naples, Italy. In October 1944, According to MGM records the film earned $1,934,000 in the US and Canada and $715,000 elsewhere, making a $237,000 profit.

The film is thought to be the source for the title of Chinua Achebe's short story of the same name.

== Radio adaptation ==
Marriage Is a Private Affair was presented on Screen Guild Theatre on June 17, 1946. Turner and Hodiak reprised their roles from the film.
