= The Awful Tooth =

- Directed by: Nate Watt
- Produced by: Hal Roach
- Starring: Carl Switzer; Billie Thomas; Eugene Lee; Henry Lee; Pete the Pup
- Cinematography: Norbert Brodine
- Edited by: William H. Ziegler
- Music by: Leroy Shield; Marvin Hatley
- Distributed by: MGM
- Release date: May 28, 1938
- Running time: 9' 55"
- Country: United States
- Language: English

The Awful Tooth is a 1938 Our Gang short comedy film directed by Nate Watt. It was the 167th Our Gang short to be released.

== Plot ==
Alfalfa, Buckwheat, Porky, and Spike in need of money to purchase baseball equipment, devise a scheme: they will have all their teeth pulled out, which they calculate will earn them one dime per tooth from the tooth fairy. Their dentist hears of their plan, and takes steps to dissuade the kids—beginning with a terrified Alfalfa. In the end, Alfalfa decides to keep his teeth, but the dentist does give them some baseball equipment as a reward for learning a valuable lesson about dental health.

== Cast ==
=== The Gang ===
- Eugene Lee as Porky
- Carl Switzer as Alfalfa
- Billie Thomas as Buckwheat
- Henry Lee as Spike
- George the Monkey as himself
- Pete the Pup as himself

=== Additional cast ===
- Jack Norton as Dr. Schwartz
- Marjorie Townsend as Miss Rogers

== See also ==
- Our Gang filmography
