= Trade Winds (film) =

1938 film by Tay Garnett

- Theatrical poster
- Directed by: Tay Garnett
- Screenplay by: Dorothy Parker; Alan Campbell; Frank R. Adams
- Story by: Tay Garnett
- Produced by: Tay Garrett; Walter Wanger(executive)
- Starring: Fredric March; Joan Bennett
- Cinematography: Rudolph Maté; Foreign exterior photography James B. Shackelford
- Edited by: Otho Lovering; Dorothy Spencer
- Music by: Musical director Alfred Newman
- Production companies: Walter Wanger Productions, Incorporated; A Tay Garnett Production
- Distributed by: United Artists
- Release dates: December 28, 1938 (limited); January 6, 1939
- Running time: 93 minutes
- Country: United States
- Language: English
- Budget: $738,733
- Box office: $964,404

Trade Winds is a 1938 American comedy murder mystery film directed by Tay Garnett written by Dorothy Parker, Alan Campbell, and Frank R. Adams, based on the story by Tay Garnett. The film stars Fredric March and Joan Bennett. It was distributed by United Artists, and released on December 28, 1938.

== Plot ==
Socialite Kay Kerrigan is accused of fatally shooting millionaire cad Thomas Bruhme II. Kay blames the callous Bruhme for her sister's suicide but when he is confronted, he dismissively throws Kay a gun, but she angrily shoots him in the stomach.

Police detectives Ben "Homer" Blodget and George Faulkner find the body, with a gunshot in the back of Bruhme's head that is the fatal shot. After finding her handbag at the murder scene, the police are on Kay's trail. First she fakes a car accident, driving into the San Francisco Bay, then makes arrangements to go to Hawaii. When she pawns a unique piece of jewelry, Police Commissioner Blackton knows that Kay is alive and puts former detective Sam Wye on the case.

Kay with her hair dyed brown, and travelling on a British passport as "Mary Holden" has taken a ship to the South Seas. She is followed by Sam and his secretary Jean Livingstone, an old flame who also wants to collect a $100,000 reward now being offered by Bruhme's father.

On a boat sailing to Singapore, Sam finally meets Kay, and immediately falls in love with her. Along the way, Homer and Jean do the same. Sam eventually determines that the actual killer was John Johnson, a jealous husband whose wife was having an affair with Bruhme. Kay is thus cleared and free to marry Sam.

== Cast ==
- Fredric March as Sam Wye
- Joan Bennett as Kay Kerrigan
- Ralph Bellamy as Ben Blodgett
- Ann Sothern as Jean Livingstone
- Sidney Blackmer as Thomas Bruhme II
- Thomas Mitchell as Commissioner Blackton
- Robert Elliott as Detective George Faulkner
- Joyce Compton as Mrs. Johnson
- Richard Tucker as John Johnson
- Dorothy Comingore as Ann (credited as Linda Winters)
- Wilma Francis as Judy

== Production ==
Principal photography on Trade Winds took place from August 22 to October 20, 1938. The film was a "labor of love" for Tay Garnett. Frank Nugent described the process in his review for The New York Times: "Tay Garnett earned the distinction yesterday of being probably the first man in history with the temerity to invite 80,000,000 persons to pay to see the movies he took on a world cruise. Mr. Garnett went abroad a few seasons ago and, having a rough outline of a script, he shot doorways in Japan, barrooms in Indo-China, the race track at Singapore, a pier in Bombay, a fishing village in the Laccadives, a twisting street in pre-war Shanghai. Hollywood bridged the gaps, set up the process screen, placed Fredric March and Joan Bennett before it..."

== Critical response ==
Frank Nugent in his contemporary review ofTrade Winds for The New York Times, said: "'Trade Winds', which blew gently into the Music Hall yesterday and may be remembered by posterity as the process shot that went 'round the world. It is not exactly a travelogue. As a mystery film it's a bit on the porous side. We hesitate to call it a romantic comedy, beginning as it does with a suicide, adding a murder and ending with a third body on the floor. And certainly it's not a straight drama. Maybe a new word is in order – a travestery comiromance, or a dramalogue of travesty." (Note: Trade Winds earned a profit of $71,129.)

Variety said: "All the elements that provide broad entertainment are present in this picture and it should reap healthy grosses. Story and adaptation are sound, production is handsome, direction is forceful and the acting is persuasive."

Kine Weekly wrote: "Yarn is essentially a melodrama-romance built on the time-tested formula of the beauteous fugitive-from-justice and the demon hawkshaw who's sent to bring her back alive. ... It's all frankly hoke, but surefire stuff for mass emotional appeal, since it has colorful and sympathetic characters"

Leslie Halliwell opined: "Smartly written mixture of comedy, drama, mystery and travelogue which comes off only in spots; it needed a firmer hand "

The Radio Times Guide to Films gave the film 2/5 stars, writing: "Director Tay Garnett justified a tax-deductible sailing trip around the world by taking a cinematographer to record the sights and writing a story en route. The footage provided the backdrop for this lightweight tale of detective Fredric March's pursuit of high-class murder suspect Joan Bennett. The stars never had to leave the studio, as the film used a record amount of back projection. Predictably, this contributed to an air of tedium."
