= Three Married Men =

1936 film by Edward Buzzell

- Directed by: Edward Buzzell
- Screenplay by: Alan Campbell; Dorothy Parker
- Story by: Owen Davis
- Produced by: Arthur Hornblow, Jr.
- Starring: Lynne Overman; William Frawley; Roscoe Karns; Mary Brian; George Barbier; Marjorie Gateson
- Cinematography: Edward Cronjager
- Edited by: Edward Dmytryk
- Music by: John Leipold
- Production company: Paramount Pictures
- Distributed by: Paramount Pictures
- Release date: September 24, 1936
- Running time: 66 minutes
- Country: United States
- Language: English

Three Married Men is a 1936 American comedy film directed by Edward Buzzell, written by Alan Campbell and Dorothy Parker, and starring Lynne Overman, William Frawley, Roscoe Karns, Mary Brian, George Barbier and Marjorie Gateson. It was released on September 24, 1936, by Paramount Pictures.

== Cast ==
- Lynne Overman as Jeff Mullins
- William Frawley as Bill Mullins
- Roscoe Karns as Peter Cary
- Mary Brian as Jennie Mullins
- George Barbier as Mr. Cary
- Marjorie Gateson as Clara
- Benny Bartlett as Percy Mullins
- Cora Sue Collins as Sue Cary
- Mabel Colcord as Mrs. Mullins
- Betty Ross Clarke as Annie
- Gail Sheridan as Rose Cary
- Donald Meek as Mr. Frisbee
- Charles C. Wilson as Train Conductor
