= Alan Campbell (screenwriter) =

American screenwriter

- Born: Alan K. Campbell; February 21, 1904; Richmond, Virginia, U.S.
- Died: June 14, 1963 (aged 59); West Hollywood, California, U.S.
- Occupations: Actor, screenwriter
- Spouses: Dorothy Parker (m. 1934; div. 1947) (m. 1950)
- Military career
- Allegiance: United States
- Branch: United States Army
- Rank: Captain
- Unit: Army Intelligence
- Conflicts: World War II

Alan K. Campbell (February 21, 1904 – June 14, 1963) was an American writer, stage actor, and screenwriter. He and his wife, Dorothy Parker, were a popular screenwriting team in Hollywood from 1934 to his death in 1963.

== Life and career ==
Born in Richmond, Virginia, he was the only child of Harry L. Campbell and his wife Hortense Eichel Campbell. He graduated from the Virginia Military Institute and moved to New York City in the late 1920s. An occasional contributor of prose to The New Yorker, he also acted on the Broadway stage. He met Dorothy Parker in 1932 and they married two years later in Raton, New Mexico. Like Parker, he was of Scottish and German-Jewish descent.

Campbell, Parker, and their collaborator, Robert Carson, earned an Academy Award nomination for Best Adapted Screenplay for 1937's A Star Is Born. He and Parker also wrote additional dialogue for The Little Foxes when Lillian Hellman was called away to work on another project.

In 1942, Campbell enlisted in the U.S. Army in Philadelphia. He was commissioned a captain, and served in Army Intelligence in Europe for the duration of World War II. Campbell and Parker divorced in 1947, then remarried in 1950. Although they lived separately from 1952 until 1961, they remained married until Campbell's death.

Campbell died of an apparent suicide on June 14, 1963, in West Hollywood, California. While Parker insisted that he would never have intentionally killed himself, and reported his death as "accidental", he had been drinking all day; capsules of the barbiturate Seconal were found around his bed, and a plastic bag was draped over his neck and shoulders. The coroner's report listed the cause of death as "acute barbiturate poisoning due to an ingestion of overdose". His remains were returned to Richmond for burial and he is buried at Hebrew Cemetery (Richmond, Virginia).

== Film portrayals ==
Campbell was portrayed by Hal Holbrook in the 1977 film Julia and by Peter Gallagher in the 1994 film Mrs. Parker and the Vicious Circle.

== Partial filmography ==
- The Moon's Our Home (1936)
- Lady Be Careful (1936)
- Three Married Men (1936)
- A Star Is Born (1937)
- Sweethearts (1938)
- Trade Winds (1938)
- The Little Foxes (1941)
- Week-End for Three (1941)
- Tales of Manhattan (1942)
- Woman on the Run (1950)
- A Star Is Born (1954)
