= Frances Gifford =

American actress (1920–1994)

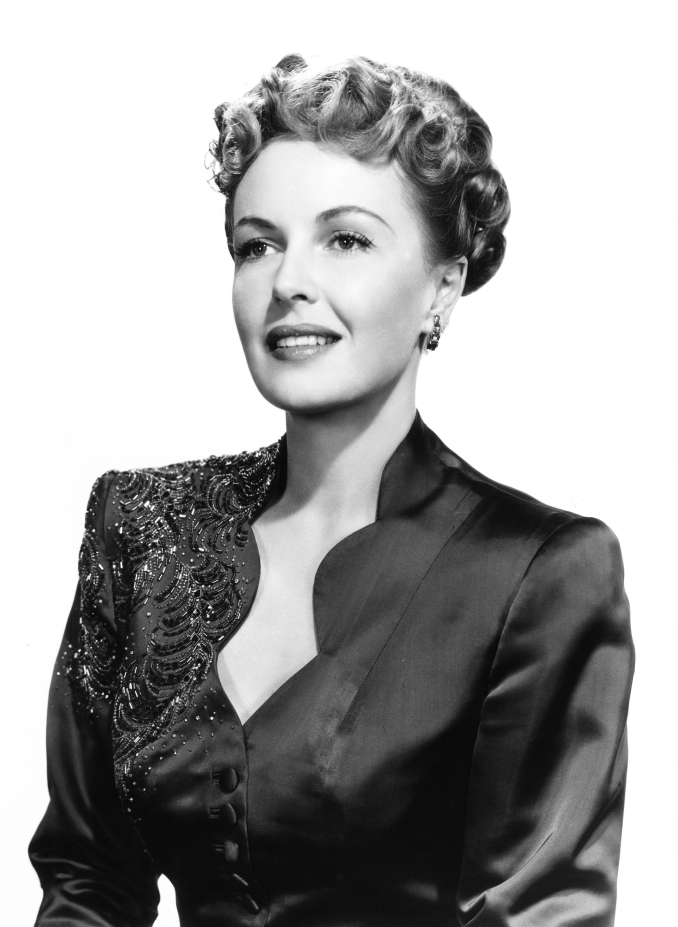
- Gifford in 1940
- Born: Mary Frances Gifford; December 7, 1920; Long Beach, California, U.S.
- Died: January 22, 1994 (aged 73); Pasadena, California, U.S.
- Resting place: Holy Cross Cemetery, Culver City, California
- Occupation: Actress
- Years active: 1937–1954
- Spouse: James Dunn (m. 1937; div. 1943)

Mary Frances Gifford (December 7, 1920 – January 22, 1994) was an American actress who played leads and supporting roles in many 1930s and 1940s movies.

== Early years ==
Gifford was born and raised in Long Beach, California on December 7, 1920, and at the age of 16 applied to UCLA School of Law with no intention of pursuing an acting career. With a friend, she visited the Samuel Goldwyn studios to watch a film being made, and was spotted by a talent scout. He brought her to the attention of Goldwyn, who signed her to an acting contract.

== Career ==
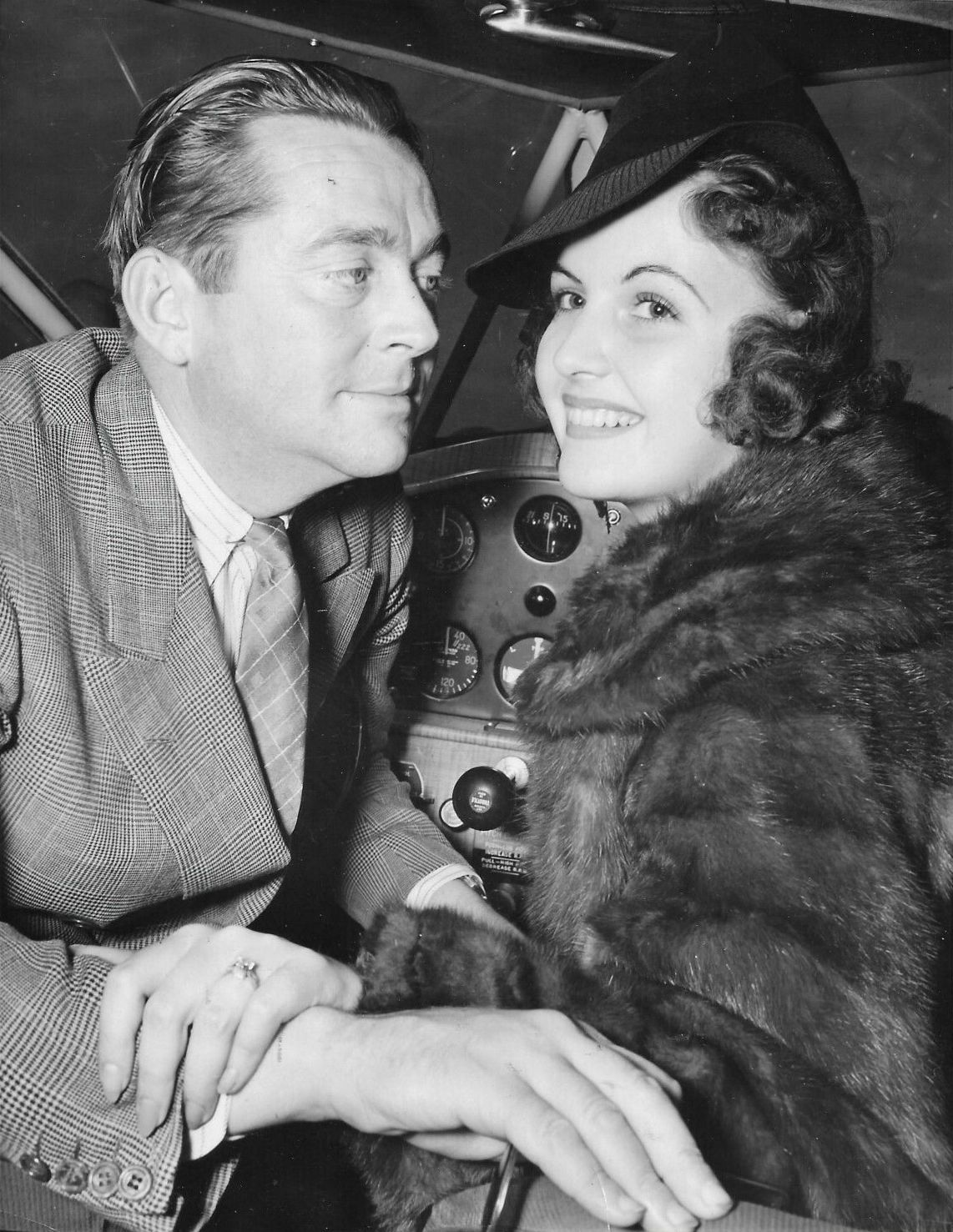
Husband James Dunn and Gifford in the cockpit of his airplane, 1937

After only receiving minor roles, Gifford moved to RKO, where she was cast in several uncredited supporting roles in films of the late 1930s, including Stage Door (1937) starring Katharine Hepburn and Ginger Rogers.

Gifford married actor James Dunn on Christmas Day 1937. In 1939, she landed her first leading role in the low-budget Mercy Plane, opposite her husband. A planned retirement was interrupted briefly when she played another uncredited role in James Stewart's break-out film Mr. Smith Goes to Washington (1939).

Gifford played several more minor roles before she being lent in 1941 to Republic Pictures and cast in the role which would arguably produce her most enduring fame: as the semiclad Nyoka in Jungle Girl, a 15-chapter movie serial, based very loosely on the novel by Edgar Rice Burroughs. The role was the first time since Pearl White in the silent era that an actress had played the lead in the movie serial genre.

The following year, Republic made a sequel Perils of Nyoka, but Gifford was no longer available and the heroine's part was played by Kay Aldridge. In the Walt Disney feature The Reluctant Dragon (1941), Gifford had a leading role as Doris, a studio artist.

With Gifford's film career gaining momentum and Dunn's on the decline, partly due to his struggles with alcoholism, the marriage had failed by 1942. She left RKO for Paramount Pictures, where she acted in several films, including The Glass Key (1942) in which she portrayed the same small role of "Nurse" that Ann Sheridan had played in the 1935 original version, albeit expanded in the remake. In 1943, she made another jungle movie, costarring with Johnny Weissmuller in Tarzan Triumphs at RKO. That year, she also left Paramount and moved to the prestigious Metro-Goldwyn-Mayer studio with the sponsorship of an MGM executive.

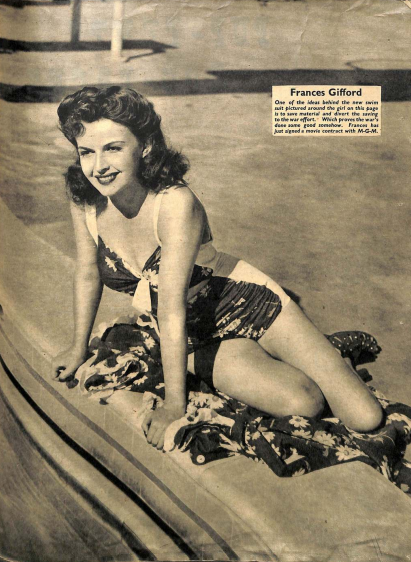
Pin-up photo of Gifford for Yank, the Army Weekly in 1943

At MGM, she had more success, playing leading roles in such films as Our Vines Have Tender Grapes (1945) opposite Edward G. Robinson and She Went to the Races (1945), followed by the more notable The Arnelo Affair (1947). Gifford also played in supporting roles, including Thrill of a Romance (1945) with Esther Williams, and Luxury Liner (1948) with Jane Powell.

=== Car accident ===
On December 31, 1947, the 27 year old Gifford was almost killed in a car accident, receiving a fractured and cut nose and other head injuries. A film executive with her received a compound fracture of a leg. The event sidelined Gifford's career and caused a sharp decline in her health. She began to lose confidence in her abilities and found it difficult to come back to films.

=== Attempted comeback ===
Losing her contract with MGM, she attempted a comeback in two early 1950s films, Frank Capra's Riding High (1950) with Bing Crosby and Sky Commando (1953) with Dan Duryea. During the 1950s, her mental and physical health declined to the point where she was placed into Camarillo State Mental Hospital in 1958. She spent almost the entire next 25 years in and out of various institutions.

== Latter years ==
In 1983 film magazine journalist Richard S. Fisher tracked Gifford down and found that she had apparently recovered and lately been volunteering at the Pasadena, California, City Library.

Gifford spent her final years in quiet obscurity and died of emphysema on January 22nd, 1994, in a convalescent center in Pasadena at the age of 73. Her cremains are interred at Holy Cross Cemetery in Culver City, California.

== Recognition ==
In 1941, Gifford was selected as "the ideal Pan-American girl" by 200 chapters of the Pan-American League on college campuses across the United States.

== Partial filmography ==
- New Faces of 1937 (1937) - Showgirl
- The Big Shot (1937) - Bertram's Secretary (uncredited)
- Stage Door (1937) - Mary McGuire (uncredited)
- Woman Chases Man (1937)
- There Goes the Groom (1937) - Minor Role (uncredited)
- Living on Love (1937) - Bus Passenger (uncredited)
- Bringing Up Baby (1938) - Minor Role (uncredited)
- Night Spot (1938) - Nightclub Patron (uncredited)
- Maid's Night Out (1938) - Ticket Seller - Octopus Concession (uncredited)
- Having a Wonderful Time (1938) - Salesgirl (uncredited)
- Sky Giant (1938) - Stewardess (uncredited)
- Mr. Smith Goes to Washington (1939) - Hopper Girl (uncredited)
- Mercy Plane (1939) - Brenda Gordon
- Forty Little Mothers (1940) - Granville Girl (uncredited)
- Hold That Woman! (1940) - Mary Mulvaney - aka Mary Parker
- The Reluctant Dragon (1941) - Doris (Studio Artist)
- Border Vigilantes (1941) - Helen Forbes
- West Point Widow (1941) - Daphne
- Jungle Girl (1941, Serial) - Nyoka Meredith
- Louisiana Purchase (1941) - Salesgirl (uncredited)
- The Remarkable Andrew (1942) - Miss Halsey
- Tombstone, the Town Too Tough to Die (1942) - Ruth Grant
- Beyond the Blue Horizon (1942) - Charlotte (uncredited)
- The Glass Key (1942) - Nurse
- My Heart Belongs to Daddy (1942) - Grace Saunders
- Star Spangled Rhythm (1942) - Herself (uncredited)
- American Empire (1942) - Abigail 'Abby' Taylor
- Tarzan Triumphs (1943) - Zandra
- Henry Aldrich Gets Glamour (1943) - Hilary Dane
- Cry 'Havoc' (1943) - Helen Domeret
- Marriage Is a Private Affair (1944) - Sissy Mortimer
- Thrill of a Romance (1945) - Maude Bancroft
- Our Vines Have Tender Grapes (1945) - Viola Johnson
- She Went to the Races (1945) - Dr. Ann Wotters
- Little Mister Jim (1946) - Jean Tukker
- The Arnelo Affair (1947) - Anne Parkson
- Luxury Liner (1948) - Laura Dene
- Riding High (1950) - Margaret Higgins
- Sky Commando (1953) - Jo McWethy
