= The Arnelo Affair =

1947 film by Arch Oboler

- Theatrical release poster
- Directed by: Arch Oboler
- Screenplay by: Arch Oboler
- Based on: the short-story "I'll Tell My Husband" by Jane Burr
- Produced by: Jerry Bresler
- Starring: John Hodiak; George Murphy; Frances Gifford; Dean Stockwell; Eve Arden
- Cinematography: Charles Salerno Jr.
- Edited by: Harry Komer
- Music by: George Bassman
- Production company: Metro-Goldwyn-Mayer
- Distributed by: Loew's, Inc.
- Release date: February 13, 1947
- Running time: 86 minutes
- Country: United States
- Language: English
- Budget: $892,000
- Box office: $838,000

The Arnelo Affair is a 1947 American film noir produced by MGM and starring John Hodiak, George Murphy, and Frances Gifford. The picture was co-written and directed by Arch Oboler. Dean Stockwell and Eve Arden appear in support.

== Plot ==
Anne is married to Chicago lawyer Ted Parkson who is busy with his career and has been neglecting her somewhat. She is introduced to one of Ted's clients, shady nightclub owner Tony Arnelo, when he comes to their home on business. The charming Arnelo is smitten with Anne and flatters her. Having been told that her hobby is interior decorating, he asks Ted if he may hire her; Ted leaves it up to her.

Arnelo persistently phones the reluctant Ann for a meeting, and she finally relents. Though she feels guilty about it, she is attracted to the very attentive Mr. Arnelo. Their meeting is ostensibly about Anne coming up with designs for his apartment, but it's clear that Arnelo has designs on Anne.

At their second meeting Arnelo gives Anne a key to his place. The next day she lets herself in and waits for him. Claire Lorrison, a jealous girlfriend of Arnelo's, enters and is upset to find Anne there. Claire introduces herself and is disparaging Arnelo when he arrives. He strikes her and Anne flees, accidentally dropping her compact.

Arnelo kills Claire and places the compact by the body. Though the police don't immediately trace it to Anne, the compact is one-of-a-kind, made for her by Ted, with her initial on it.

Arnelo tells Anne that he was never seen with Claire Lorrison, and that if she goes to the police he will implicate her—even unsubstantiated, the scandal would harm her marriage and Ted's career. He demands that she leave Ted for him.

Ted accidentally finds Arnelo's key in Anne's purse. Detective Sam Leonard, who has been investigating the case, shows him the compact, which he recognizes. Arnelo tells Ted that he loves Anne, that she murdered Claire, and that he has an incriminating letter that she wrote.

Though Ted is starting to have doubts, when he learns from Detective Leonard the time of the murder he knows that Anne could not have been there. He is on his way to confront Arnelo when the police head him off. Detective Leonard takes his old friend Arnelo for a ride—he has suspected him all along, and wants him to confess.

Knowing how Arnelo feels about Anne, Leonard asks how he could drag her into the inevitable court case, even if he thinks he could get off. Arnelo starts to break down but jumps out of the car. After a short chase, he is fatally shot by Leonard, but lives long enough to tell Ted, who was following in another police car, that he lied and that his wife is innocent.

Anne, who was distraught enough to consider suicide, is relieved when Ted returns her compact and affirms his love for her.

== Cast ==
- John Hodiak as Tony Arnelo
- George Murphy as Ted Parkson
- Frances Gifford as Anne Parkson
- Dean Stockwell as Ricky Parkson
- Eve Arden as Vivian Delwyn
- Warner Anderson as Detective Sam Leonard
- Ruth Brady as Dorothy Alison
- Lowell Gilmore as Dr. Avery Border
- Archie Twitchell as Roger Alison
- Ruby Dandridge as Maybelle, the Maid
- Joan Woodbury as Claire Lorrison

== Reception ==
=== Box office ===
The film earned $524,000 in the US and Canada and $314,000 elsewhere, against production costs of $892,000, incurring a loss.

=== Critical response ===
Contemporary reviews were mixed. New York Times film critic Bosley Crowther panned the film. He wrote, "And childish it is, beyond question, despite the promising presence in the cast of John Hodiak, Frances Gifford, George Murphy and other minor 'names.' It's a 'stream of consciousness' fable about a lawyer's neglected wife who takes up with a night-club owner and gets into a most embarrassing jam. It is unmercifully slow and sombre and utterly devoid of surprise."

Variety magazine's review at the time was more positive. The staff wrote, "Arch Oboler, radio’s master of suspense, has effectively transposed his technique into the visual medium with The Arnelo Affair. Strictly speaking this is not a whodunit, nor can it be catalogued as a psychological suspense picture ... There’s never a question as to who committed the murder, but the crime is secondary to its effect on the characters involved. Until the film’s very climax, no hint is given to the ultimate denouement. Dialogue instills the feeling of action where none exists for much of the footage, and the gab is excellent but for a couple of spots when Oboler gives vent to florid passages."
