= The Delightful Rogue =

1929 film

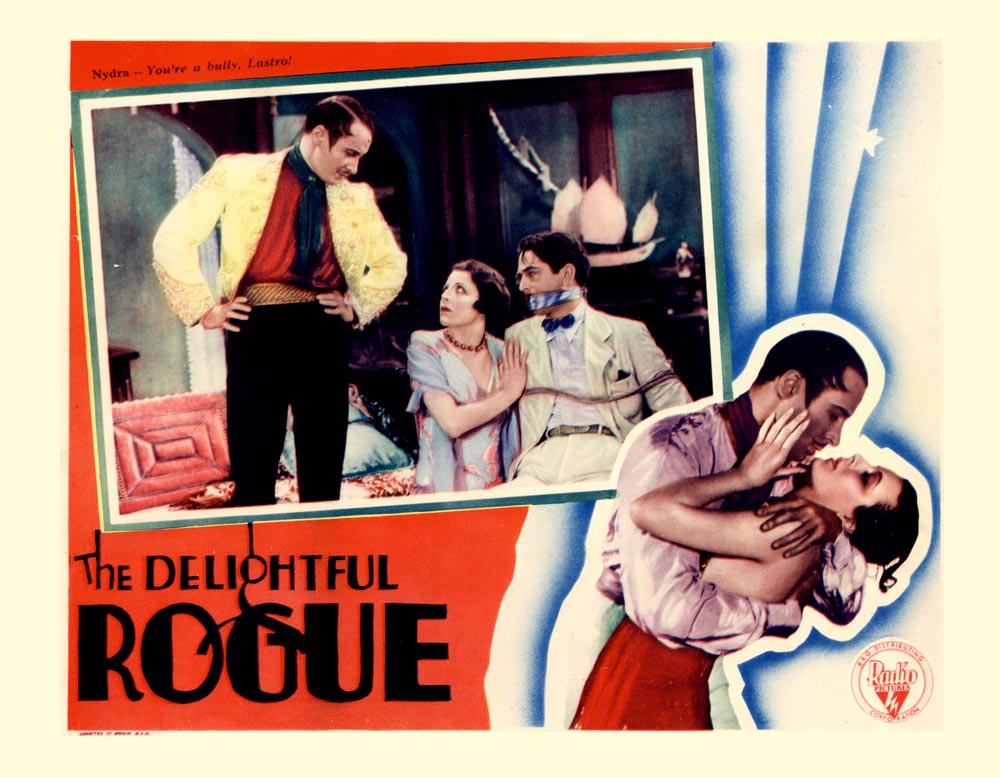
- Movie card
- Directed by: Lynn Shores; A. Leslie Pearce
- Written by: Wallace Smith
- Produced by: William LeBaron
- Starring: Rod La Rocque; Rita La Roy; Charles Byer
- Music by: Oscar Levant; Sidney Clare
- Production company: RKO Radio Pictures
- Distributed by: RKO Radio Pictures
- Release date: September 22, 1929 (US)
- Running time: 71 minutes; 7 reels
- Country: United States
- Language: English

The Delightful Rogue is a 1929 American pre-Code romantic adventure film produced and distributed by RKO Pictures. The film was directed by A. Leslie Pearce, with the screenplay by Wallace Smith, based on his short story, A Woman Decides. The film stars Rod La Rocque as a modern-day pirate in the south seas, as well as Rita La Roy and Charles Byer. La Rocque had been playing similar style adventurers in a few of his last silent films, and this film attempts to replicate the success of those silent adventure movies using RCA's early sound equipment, the Photophone system.

== Plot ==
Lastro is a modern-day pirate who hijacks a yacht and heads into the tropic port of Tapit. He is wanted for a variety of offenses, including murder and robbery. Upon his arrival, he is recognized by a local native leader, Junipero, but Junipero takes a bribe to not turn him in. While in Tapit, he sees an American dancer, Nydra, whom he is immediately attracted to. Nydra is also being pursued by Harry Beall, the heir to a wealthy American family, yet Nydra is intrigued by Lastro's self-assurance and audacity.

Lastro is betrayed by Junipero, who brings the police to arrest him. In the ensuing melee, Lastro overcomes both Junipero and the police, as well as easily brushing aside Beall. To secure his safe escape, Lastro takes Beall as a hostage back to his yacht. Nydra appears to beg Lastro to let Beall go, which Lastro agrees to, on one condition: Nydra must spend the night with him in his cabin aboard the yacht. Nydra agrees. Nothing untoward happens, with the two simply spending the time talking and getting to know each other. Nydra is impressed with Lastro's gallantry. However, Beall has spent the night imagining the worst, and his jealous reactions in the morning completely turn Nydra off. Disgusted with his behavior, Nydra sets sails with Lastro.

== Cast ==
- Rod La Rocque as Lastro, The Pirate
- Rita La Roy as Nydra
- Charles Byer as Harry Beal
- Ed Brady as MacDougal
- Harry Semels as Hymie
- Sammy Blum as Junipero
- Bert Moorhouse as Nielson

== Notes ==
There was a single song featured in the film, "Gay Love", by the writing team of Oscar Levant and Sidney Clare. Shortly after the film's release, Bing Crosby released a version of "Gay Love" on the B-side of "Can't We Be Friends" on a Columbia Records 78 record.

Wallace Smith's short story, upon which the screenplay was based, originally appeared in Cosmopolitan magazine.

== See also ==
- List of early sound feature films (1926–1929)
- South Seas genre
