= Nina Shipman =

American actress (1938–2026)

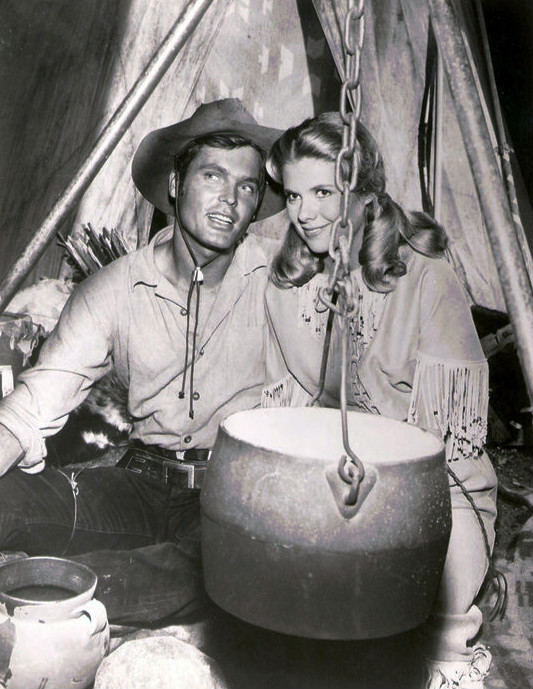
- Ty Hardin and Shipman in a 1962 episode of Bronco
- Born: August 15, 1938; Los Angeles, California, U.S.
- Died: September 6, 2026 (aged 88); Gardena, California, U.S.
- Occupation: Actress
- Years active: 1957–1987
- Spouses: Richard Harrington (m. 1956; div. 1958); C. Ransom Walrod (m. 1961; div. 1973); Donald Merrill Bremer (m. 1975; death 2015)
- Children: 2
- Parent(s): Barry Shipman; Gwynne Shipman
- Relatives: Ernest Shipman (grandfather); Nell Shipman (grandmother)

Nina Shipman (August 15, 1938 – September 6, 2026) was an American actress, best remembered for her roles during the Golden Age of Hollywood and Western classic films.

== Early years ==
Shipman was born in Los Angeles, California, on August 15, 1938, the daughter of screenwriter Barry Shipman and dancer and film actress Gwynne Shipman. Her grandfather Ernest Shipman was a member of one of the first Shakespearean touring companies in the United States, and her grandmother, Nell Shipman, was a silent film actress.

She attended Maddox Academy in Mexico City and Eagle Rock High School in Los Angeles, California. Shipman graduated from California State University, Los Angeles, with a degree in music. She enhanced her acting skills at the Pasadena Playhouse, in film industry workshops, and by studying under acting coach Sanford Meisner.

== Educational television ==
In 1981, Shipman was host of Contemporary Health Issues, a series consisting of 30 half-hour episodes that could be used by students to earn credits at participating colleges and universities. The series' topics included death, sexuality, drugs, cardiovascular disease, alcoholism, and cancer.

== Book ==
Shipman was the author of How to Become an Actor in Television Commercials (1975).

== Personal life and death ==
Shipman was married three times. She married Richard Harrington in 1956, but they divorced two years later. Her second husband, from 1961 until their divorce in 1973, was actor and stuntman C. Ransom Walrod. They had two daughters, Westerly (born 1967) and Lani (born 1970). Shipman's third husband was Donald Merrill Bremer; they were married from 1975 until his death in 2015.

She was maid of honor at Jill St. John's wedding to Lance Reventlow.

Shipman died at a hospital in Gardena, California, on September 6, 2026, at the age of 88.

== Selected filmography ==
- Official Detective (1958, TV series, in episode "Murder In A Girl's School") – Sally
- Vertigo (1958) – Woman in Museum Mistaken for Madeleine (uncredited)
- The Hunters (1958) – WAF Lieutenant (uncredited)
- In Love and War (1958) – Nurse (uncredited)
- Compulsion (1959) – Girlfriend (uncredited)
- Say One for Me (1959) – Fay Flagg
- Blue Denim (1959) – Lillian Bartley
- The Oregon Trail (1959) – Prudence Cooper
- The Man Who Understood Women (1959) – Minor Role (uncredited)
- Wake Me When It's Over (1960) – Minor Role (uncredited)
- High Time (1960) – Laura Howard
- The Adventures of Ozzie and Harriet (TV series 1952-66) – Paula in the 1962 episode "The Apartment"; Peggy in the 1963 episode "The Girl At The Ski Lodge"
- 77 Sunset Strip (TV series 1958–1964) "The Hamlet Caper" (S3EP17, January 6, 1961) – Darlene Wells; "The Lady Has The Answer" (S4EP5, October 20, 1961) Rita Yale
- Straightaway (TV series, 1961–1962) "The Bribe" (S1EP13, December 29, 1961) – Laurie
- Ichabod and Me (TV series, 1961–1962) "Bob's Award" (S1EP29, April 17, 1962) – Lois Wainwright
- Bonanza (TV series, 1962) Episode: "The Mountain Girl" – Trudy Coombs-Harker
- The Munsters (TV series, 1964–1966) – the Beautiful Woman in "Lily Munster, Girl Model" (season 1, episode 33)
- Rawhide appearing as Marion Curtis, a blind woman, in the 1962 episode, "Incident of the Portrait."
- Rawhide appearing as Valley Rose, in the 1963 episode, "Incident of the Rawhiders"
- Daniel Boone (TV series, 1964–1970) – Molly in "The Sisters O'Hanrahan"
- Perry Mason (1965) S8, E16 as Maxine Nichols murder victim, and S9, E4 as Carol Olin
- The Andy Griffith Show – appearing as county nurse Irene Fairchild, in the 1966 episode “The County Clerk” (season 6, episode 26).
- The Beverly Hillbillies (TV series 1965 Season 4 #7) – As Linda Curry.... Tales of Wells Fargo 1960 episode: Bitter Vengeance
- Adam-12 (1970, S2E26, "Shoplift") – Jane

== Bibliography ==
- Pitts, Michael R. Western Movies: A Guide to 5,105 Feature Films. McFarland, 2012.
