= Borderland (1937 film) =

1937 film by Nate Watt

- Theatrical release poster
- Directed by: Nate Watt
- Screenplay by: Harrison Jacobs
- Produced by: Harry Sherman
- Starring: William Boyd; James Ellison; George "Gabby" Hayes; Morris Ankrum; John Beach; Nora Lane; Charlene Wyatt
- Cinematography: Archie Stout
- Edited by: Robert B. Warwick Jr.
- Music by: Lee Zahler
- Production company: Paramount Pictures
- Distributed by: Paramount Pictures
- Release date: February 26, 1937
- Running time: 82 minutes
- Country: United States
- Language: English

Borderland is a 1937 American Western film directed by Nate Watt and written by Harrison Jacobs. The film stars William Boyd, James Ellison, George "Gabby" Hayes, Morris Ankrum, John Beach, Nora Lane, and Charlene Wyatt. The film was released on February 26, 1937, by Paramount Pictures.

== Plot ==
The Plot follows ranger Hoppy who goes undercover in an outlaw gang operating in the border, Hoppy has to find the head of the gang and dismantle it.

== Cast ==
- William Boyd as Hopalong Cassidy
- James Ellison as Johnny Nelson
- George "Gabby" Hayes as Windy Halliday
- Morris Ankrum as Loco
- John Beach as Texas Ranger Bailey
- Nora Lane as Grace Rand
- Charlene Wyatt as Molly Rand
- Trevor Bardette as Colonel Gonzales
- Earle Hodgins as Major Stafford
- Al Bridge as Henchman 'Dandy' Morgan
- George Chesebro as Henchman Tom Parker
- John St. Polis as Doctor
