= Border Vigilantes =

1941 film by Derwin Abrahams

- Theatrical release poster
- Directed by: Derwin Abrahams
- Screenplay by: J. Benton Cheney
- Produced by: Harry Sherman
- Starring: William Boyd; Russell Hayden; Andy Clyde; Frances Gifford; Victor Jory; Ethel Wales; Morris Ankrum
- Cinematography: Russell Harlan
- Edited by: Robert B. Warwick Jr.
- Music by: John Leipold
- Production company: Harry Sherman Productions
- Distributed by: Paramount Pictures
- Release date: April 18, 1941
- Running time: 63 minutes
- Country: United States
- Language: English

Border Vigilantes is a 1941 American Western film directed by Derwin Abrahams and written by J. Benton Cheney. The film stars William Boyd, Russell Hayden, Andy Clyde, Frances Gifford, Victor Jory, Ethel Wales and Morris Ankrum. The film was released on April 18, 1941, by Paramount Pictures.

Border Vigilantes was the 34th entry in the Hopalong Cassidy western series, with 32 more still on the way.

== Plot ==
Hopalong Cassidy (William Boyd), California Carlson (Andy Clyde) and Lucky Jenkins (Russell Hayden) ride into a town bedevilled by outlaw raids, despite the existence of a local vigilante committee. Sensing that something's wrong with this set-up, Hoppy does a bit of digging and discovers that the outlaw chieftain is the head of the vigilantes.

== Cast ==
- William Boyd as Hopalong Cassidy
- Russell Hayden as Lucky Jenkins
- Andy Clyde as California Carlson
- Frances Gifford as Helen Forbes
- Victor Jory as Henry Logan
- Ethel Wales as Aunt Jennifer Forbes
- Morris Ankrum as Dan Forbes
- Tom Tyler as Henchman Yager
- Hal Taliaferro as Henchman Big Ed Stone
- Jack Rockwell as Hank Weaver
- Britt Wood as Lafe Willis
