= Marriage Is a Private Affair (short story) =

1952 short story by Chinua Achebe

"Marriage Is a Private Affair" is a 1952 short story by Nigerian writer Chinua Achebe. According to Liam Kruger, the story "is generally understood" to have been the starting point for Achebe's later novel No Longer at Ease, the sequel to his Things Fall Apart.

== Publication history and title ==
The story has a complex publication history. It was first published as "The Old Order in Conflict with the New" in The University Herald, a student magazine at Ibadan University. It was reprinted in slightly expanded form in 1962 under the title "The Beginning of the End" in a Nigerian anthology of Achebe's writing, The Sacrificial Egg and Other Stories. It was then edited and reprinted again in 1972 as "Marriage is a Private Affair" in the Heinemann anthology Girls at War and Other Stories.

In the assessment of Liam Kruger, the title "Marriage is a Private Affair" "appears to be drawn from a 1944 war comedy that bears little resemblance to Achebe’s story until the very end". Both stories end with the protagonist seeing some kind of vision: in Achebe's story, Nnaemeka's father has visions of his grandchildren; in the film, protagonist has visions of various men she could have married. In Kruger's reading,

The movement from 1952 to 1972, in which the title progresses from a bald statement of the principal theme, to a less bald but more decisive statement (since one gathers that the beginning of the end describes the new order overcoming the old), to an oblique reference to an American film in which the nuclear family prevails over war and profit only through withdrawal from public life suggests ambivalence over whether Achebe's original ending to "marriage is a Private affair" was indeed a happier one than his retelling of it in No Longer at Ease.

== Summary ==
Nnaemeka and Nene, young teachers in Lagos, are engaged and are trying to discuss their marriage. Nnaemeka is worried that his family will disapprove of the marriage because he and Nene are from different ethnic groups.

Nnaemeka's father Okeke wants to decide who his son should marry, and sends Nnaemeka a letter on the subject. The letter says that the girl his father has chosen for him is the girl who used to beat all the boys up at school—Ugoye Nweka. Nnaemeka decides not to tell Nene about the letter his father sent him yet.

Nnaemeka visits his father in his home village. Later, on the second evening of Nnaemeka's return, he decides to find his father to confess that he cannot marry Ugoye. Nnaemeka says to his father that he cannot marry Nweke's daughter because he does not love her. Nnaemeka's father says that love is not important. Realising that he will not change his father's mind in this way, Nnaemeka admits that he is already engaged. "From that night", the story says, "the father scarcely spoke to his son".

Nnaemeka is opposed by the people in his home village, partly because he is going to marry a woman who speaks a different language than them. Then, the discussion becomes theological: Nnaemeka's opposition to his father is seen as contrary to Christian teachings. The friends of Nnaemeka's father suggest he call in a native doctor to help. However, Nnaemeka's father is not superstitious like his neighbours, and he does not want to participate in his son's affairs at all.

Nene too faces prejudice for her marriage among her friends in Lagos.

The story ends with Nnaemeka's father Okeke reading a letter that mentions Nnaemeka's sons. Okeke suddenly regrets refusing to meet his grandchildren. The story closes with the words

By a curious mental process he imagined them standing, sad and forsaken, under the harsh angry weather—shut out from his house. That night he hardly slept, from remorse—and a vague fear that he might die without making it up to them.

== Critical reception ==
According to Tom Michael Mboya,

In 'Marriage is a Private Affair' Achebe pushes for the building of a Nigerian nation. But he fears that the realization of a Nigerian nation may not come to pass. His fear arises out of an acute awareness of how entrenched exclusivist ethnic sentiment is in the country. Achebe recognizes that the exclusivist ethnic sentiment leads to the consideration of those outside one's ethnic group as being 'unlike ... people'.
