= Skiptrace =

Process of locating a person's whereabouts

Skiptracing is the process of locating a person's whereabouts. Skiptracing tactics may be employed by a skip tracer, contact tracer (in a public health context), debt collector, process server, bail bondsman or bail agency enforcer (bounty hunter), repossession agent, private investigator, lawyer, police detective, journalist, stalker or by any person attempting to locate a subject whose contact information is not immediately known. Similar techniques have also been used by investigators to locate witnesses in criminal trials.

== Terminology ==
Other terms include to skip trace, or debtor and fugitive recovery. A skip tracer is someone who performs this task, which may be the person's primary occupation. The term skip (as a noun) refers to the person being searched for, and is derived from the idiomatic expression "to skip town", meaning to depart (perhaps in a rush or perhaps hoping to elude creditors or law enforcement). As such, the skip tracers need to track down ("trace") the skip to their new location. The term skip is "attested by the mid 14th century, meaning 'to run, go, rush, flee,' and also 'to make off, hasten away'."

== Methods ==
Skiptracing is performed in stages. The first step is gather the basic information about the person, such as first, middle, and last name, variants (e.g., an individual named Robert may go by "Rob"), aliases, and nicknames. The person's date of birth, last known physical addresses, email addresses, and phone numbers are also important. The person's social media pages may yield clues about their whereabouts. The skip tracer also gathers historical information such as the names of schools the person attended, as this can generate leads about friends who might know their whereabouts. Skip tracers also gather information about the person's friends, family and business associates.

Then the skip tracer will start collecting as much information as possible about the subject using Internet searches, databases, public records, and their network of contacts. Often, the job becomes more than research since one must usually employ methods of social engineering, which involves calling or visiting former neighbors or other known contacts to ask about the person, sometimes under false or misleading pretenses.

Records or Information that skip tracers use may include phone number databases, credit reports (including information provided on a loan application, credit card application, and in other debt collector databases), job application information, criminal background checks, utility bills, Social Security, disability, and public tax information. While some of these records may be publicly available, some cannot be accessed without an appropriate search warrant, or a specific permissible purpose, which is generally only available to financial institutions, their contracted third-party vendors, law enforcement or licensed private investigators.

Even when no specific information is returned, public and private databases exist that cross-reference skiptracing information with others the skip may have lived with in the recent past. For instance, if previous records show a skip lived in the same house as a third party, the third party may also be skiptraced in an effort to locate the primary target.

The next step is to verify the information. The information is then analyzed and verified, eliminating some leads as outdated or associated with the wrong person. Sometimes the person's current whereabouts are in the data, but are obfuscated by the sheer amount of information or disinformation.

In the past, skiptracing included such things as dumpster diving and pretext calls to utility companies. Currently, skiptracing is largely conducted online using paid databases and phone calls to gather and verify information. Modern social media platforms such as Facebook have greatly simplified skiptracing work.

== See also ==
- Doxing
