= Morris Ankrum =

American actor (1896–1964)

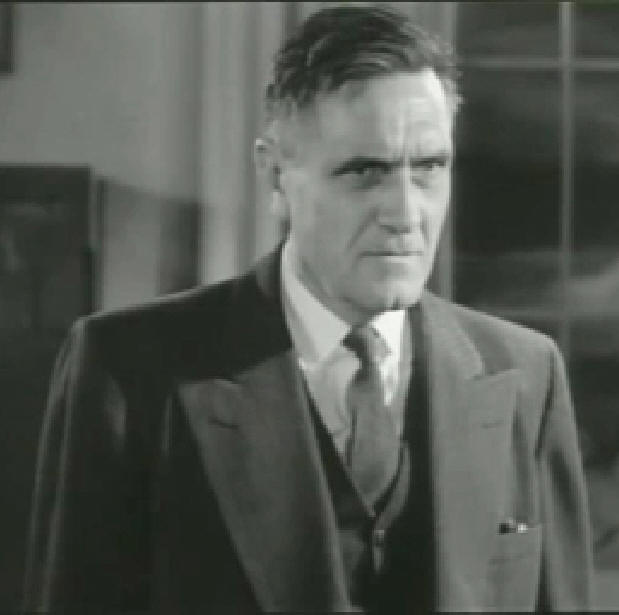
- Morris in Rocketship X-M (1950)
- Born: Morris Winslow Ankrum; August 28, 1897; Danville, Illinois, U.S.
- Died: September 2, 1964 (aged 67); Pasadena, California, U.S.
- Resting place: Spring Hill Cemetery and Mausoleum, Danville, Illinois, U.S.
- Education: University of Southern California
- Occupations: Actor; lawyer; professor
- Years active: 1923–1964
- Spouses: Gillian Gilbert, Elizabeth Lawrence (m. 1925, divorced), Joan Wheeler (m. 1935)
- Children: 4

Morris Winslow Ankrum (August 28, 1897 – September 2, 1964) was an American radio, television, and film character actor.

== Early life ==
Ankrum was born in Danville in Vermilion County, Illinois to Horace Lee Ankrum (1869–1908) and Carrie B. Ankrum (née Gregory; 1868–1944). He pursued a career in law. After graduating from The University of Southern California, he went on to an associate professorship in economics at the University of California, Berkeley. While at Berkeley, he became involved in the drama department and eventually began teaching drama and directing at the Pasadena Playhouse.

From 1923 to 1939 he acted in or produced a number of Broadway stage productions, including Gods of the Lightning, The Big Blow, and Within the Gates.

== Film career ==
Upon signing with Paramount Pictures in the 1930s, he chose to use the name "Stephen Morris" before changing it to Morris Ankrum in 1939.

Ankrum was cast in supporting roles as stalwart authority figures, including scientists, military men (particularly United States Army officers), judges, trail hands, bankers, and even psychiatrists in more than 270 films and television episodes. His parts included villainous roles in Paramount's Hopalong Cassidy film series. Ankrum was in Metro-Goldwyn-Mayer's production of Tennessee Johnson (1942), a biographical film about Andrew Johnson, the 17th U.S. president. As Sen. Jefferson Davis, Ankrum addresses the United States Senate upon his resignation to lead the Confederate States of America as that republic's first—and only—president. Ankrum's film career spanned 30 years. His credits were largely concentrated in the western and science-fiction genres.

Ankrum appeared in such westerns as Ride 'Em Cowboy in 1942, Vera Cruz opposite Gary Cooper and Burt Lancaster, Apache (1954), and Cattle Queen of Montana with Barbara Stanwyck and Ronald Reagan.

In the science fiction genre, he appeared as the rocket project leader in Rocketship X-M (1950); as a Martian leader in Flight to Mars (1951); in Red Planet Mars (1952), playing the United States Secretary of Defense; in the cult classic Invaders From Mars (1953), playing a United States Army colonel; as Army generals in Earth vs. the Flying Saucers (1956) and Beginning of the End (1957); as a psychiatrist in the cult classic Kronos (1957); an Air Force general in The Giant Claw (1957); President Ulysses S. Grant in From the Earth to the Moon (1958); and an archeologist in the independent production Giant from the Unknown (1958).

== Later years ==
By the end of 1958 Ankrum's film career had essentially ended, though he continued taking television roles. In the syndicated series Stories of the Century, Ankrum played outlaw Chris Evans, who with his young associate John Sontag, played by John Smith, turned to crime to thwart the Southern Pacific Railroad, which Evans and Sontag held in contempt.

Ankrum made 22 appearances on CBS's Perry Mason as one of several judges who regularly presided over the murder trials of Mason's clients from the show's first season in 1957 until his death in 1964. The show ended two years later. Ankrum appeared in some of the more popular western series such as The Adventures of Rin Tin Tin, Bronco, Maverick, Tales of the Texas Rangers, Cimarron City, Rawhide and The Rifleman.

Ankrum appeared in a number of ABC/Warner Brothers westerns. On October 15, 1957, he had a major part in the episode "Strange Land" of the series Sugarfoot, starring Will Hutchins. Ankrum played an embittered rancher named Cash Billings, who allowed hired gunman Burr Fulton ( Rhodes Reason) to take over his spread, but Sugarfoot arrives to bring law and justice to the situation. Ankrum appeared again, as John Savage, in 1959 in the Sugarfoot episode "The Wild Bunch". The same year, he portrayed a zealot who abused his daughter, played by Sherry Jackson, in the episode "The Naked Gallows" of the western Maverick with Jack Kelly and Mike Connors. In 1961, he again played embittered, and this time paralyzed, rancher Cyrus Dawson in the episode "Incident at Dawson Flats" of the western series Cheyenne.

In the 1958–1959 season Ankrum appeared 12 times in Richard Carlson's syndicated western series Mackenzie's Raiders. In the series set on the Rio Grande border, Carlson played Col. Ranald Mackenzie, who faces troubles from assorted border outlaws.

Ankrum was cast in an episode of the 1959 CBS sitcom Dennis the Menace. He also made occasional uncredited appearances in several Roger Corman films. While busy in films and television, Ankrum was still involved in live theatre and continued to direct plays at the Pasadena Playhouse.

== Personal life ==
Ankrum and his second wife, Joan Wheeler (married a.k.a. Joan Ankrum), had a child, David Ankrum, best known as Adam from Tabitha. David Ankrum eventually became a Hollywood agent. Joan Ankrum, of Joan Ankrum Galleries, became a prominent Los Angeles art dealer with a gallery on La Cienega Boulevard

== Death ==
On September 2, 1964, Ankrum died as the result of trichinosis. At the time of his death, he was still involved with Raymond Burr's Perry Mason TV series. His final appearance on Perry Mason, in the episode "The Case of the Sleepy Slayer", and his last feature film, Guns of Diablo, in which he was cast as Ray Macklin, were released in 1964 and 1965, respectively, following Ankrum's death.

== Selected filmography ==
- Stand Up and Cheer! (1934) as Washington Press Correspondent (uncredited)
- Trail Dust (1936) as Tex Anderson
- Borderland (1937) as Loco
- Hills of Old Wyoming (1937) as Andrews
- North of the Rio Grande (1937) as Henry Stoneham
- Rustlers' Valley (1937) as Glen Randall
- Knights of the Range (1940) as Gamecock
- The Showdown (1940) as Baron Rendor
- Buck Benny Rides Again (1940) as Second Outlaw
- Cherokee Strip (1940) as Hawk Barrett
- Three Men from Texas (1940) as Bruce Morgan
- Doomed Caravan (1941) as Stephen Westcott
- Cheers for Miss Bishop (1941) as Professor at Minna's Hearing (uncredited)
- The Roundup (1941) as 'Parenthesis'
- In Old Colorado (1941) as Joe Weiler
- Border Vigilantes (1941) as Dan Forbes
- Pirates on Horseback (1941) as Ace Gibson
- Wide Open Town (1941) as Jim Stuart
- This Woman Is Mine (1941) as Roussel
- The Bandit Trail (1941) as Red Haggerty
- I Wake Up Screaming (1941) as Assistant District Attorney
- Road Agent (1941) as Big John Morgan
- Ride 'Em Cowboy (1942) as Ace Anderson
- Roxie Hart (1942) as Martin S. Harrison
- Ten Gentlemen from West Point (1942) as Wood
- Tales of Manhattan (1942) as Judge Tom Barnes (Robinson sequence)
- The Loves of Edgar Allan Poe (1942) as Mr. Graham
- The Omaha Trail (1942) as Henchman Job
- Tennessee Johnson (1942) as Jefferson Davis
- Time to Kill (1942) as Alexander Morny
- Reunion in France (1942) as Martin
- The Human Comedy (1943) as Mr. Beaufrere (uncredited)
- Assignment in Brittany (1943) as Stenger (uncredited)
- Dixie Dugan (1943) as Editor
- Best Foot Forward (1943) as Col. Harkrider
- Let's Face It (1943) as Man in Sun Shell Cafe (uncredited)
- I Dood It (1943) as Brinker
- Swing Fever (1943) as Dan Conlon
- The Cross of Lorraine (1943) as Col. Demas (uncredited)
- Whistling in Brooklyn (1943) as Blake - Newspaper Editor (uncredited)
- See Here, Private Hargrove (1944) as Col. Forbes (uncredited)
- The Heavenly Body (1944) as Dr. Green
- Rationing (1944) as Mr. Morgan
- And Now Tomorrow (1944)
- Meet the People (1944) as Monte Rowland
- Kismet (1944) as The Caliph's Messenger (uncredited)
- Marriage Is a Private Affair (1944) as Mr. Ed Scofield
- Barbary Coast Gent (1944) as Alec Veeder
- Thirty Seconds over Tokyo (1944) as Admiral William F. Halsey (uncredited)
- Gentle Annie (1944) as Deputy Gansby
- The Hidden Eye (1945) as Ferris
- Adventure (1945) as Mr. Ludlow - Farmer (uncredited)
- The Thin Man Goes Home (1945) as Willoughby
- The Harvey Girls (1946) as Rev. Claggett
- The Postman Always Rings Twice (1946) as Judge Parkman (uncredited)
- The Green Years (1946) as Dr. Galbraith (uncredited)
- Courage of Lassie (1946) as Farmer Crews
- The Cockeyed Miracle (1946) as Dr. Wilson
- Undercurrent (1946) (uncredited)
- Lady in the Lake (1947) as Eugene Grayson
- The Mighty McGurk (1947) as Fowles
- The Sea of Grass (1947) as A.J. Crane, Attorney
- Undercover Maisie (1947) as Parker (scenes cut)
- Song of the Thin Man (1947) as The Police Inspector (uncredited)
- Cynthia (1947) as Mr. Phillips, the High-School Principal
- Merton of the Movies (1947) as Goodfellow's Club Manager (uncredited)
- Desire Me (1947) as Hector Martin
- Good News (1947) as Dean Griswold
- High Wall (1947) as Dr. Stanley Griffin
- Alias a Gentleman (1948) as O.K. (scenes cut)
- Fighting Back (1948) as Robert J. Higby
- For the Love of Mary (1948) as Adm. Walton
- Joan of Arc (1948) as Capt. Poton de Xaintrailles
- Bad Men of Tombstone (1949) as Mr. Jones
- We Were Strangers (1949) as Mr. Seymour
- Colorado Territory (1949) as United States Marshal
- The Fountainhead (1949) as Prosecutor (uncredited)
- Slattery's Hurricane (1949) as Dr. Holmes (uncredited)
- Chain Lightning (1950) as Ed Bostwick
- Borderline (1950) as Bill Whittaker
- The Damned Don't Cry! (1950) as Jim Whitehead
- In a Lonely Place (1950) as Lloyd Barnes
- Rocketship X-M (1950) as Dr. Ralph Fleming
- Southside 1-1000 (1950) as Eugene Deane
- Short Grass (1950) as Hal Fenton
- The Redhead and the Cowboy (1951) as Sheriff
- The Lion Hunters (1951) as Tom Forbes
- Fighting Coast Guard (1951) as Navy Captain
- Along the Great Divide (1951) as Ed Roden
- Tomorrow Is Another Day (1951) as Hugh Wagner
- Flight to Mars (1951) as Ikron
- My Favorite Spy (1951) as Gen. Frazer
- Fort Osage (1952) as Arthur Pickett
- Mutiny (1952) as Capt. Radford
- Red Planet Mars (1952) as Secretary of Defense Sparks
- And Now Tomorrow (1952)
- Three for Bedroom "C" (1952) as Well-Wisher at Station (uncredited)
- Son of Ali Baba (1952) as Ali Baba
- The Raiders (1952) as Alcalde Thomas Ainsworth
- Because of You (1952) as Dr. Travis
- Hiawatha (1952) as Iagoo
- The Man Behind the Gun (1953) as Bram Creegan
- Fort Vengeance (1953) as Chief Crowfoot
- Invaders From Mars (1953) as Col. Fielding
- Arena (1953) as Bucky Hillberry
- Devil's Canyon (1953) as Sheriff
- Sky Commando (1953) as Gen. W.R. Combs
- Mexican Manhunt (1953) as Tip Morgan
- The Moonlighter (1953) as Alexander Prince
- Flight Nurse (1953) as Interrogating Officer (uncredited)
- Three Young Texans (1954) as Jeff Blair
- Taza, Son of Cochise (1954) as Grey Eagle
- Southwest Passage (1954) as Dr. Elias P. Stanton
- Drums Across the River (1954) as Chief Ouray
- The Saracen Blade (1954)
- Silver Lode (1954) as Zachary Evans
- Apache (1954) as Dawson
- The Outlaw Stallion (1954) as Sheriff
- Two Guns and a Badge (1954) as Sheriff Jackson
- Cattle Queen of Montana (1954) as J.I. 'Pop' Jones
- The Steel Cage (1954) as Prison Board Member Garvey (segment "The Hostages")
- Vera Cruz (1954) as Gen. Ramírez
- Many Rivers to Cross (1955) as Mr. Emmett - Surly Innkeeper & J.P. (uncredited)
- Crashout (1955) as Head Guard
- The Silver Star (1955) as Charlie Childress
- Chief Crazy Horse (1955) as Red Cloud
- The Eternal Sea (1955) as Vice-Adm. Arthur Dewey Struble
- No Man's Woman (1955) as Capt. Hostedder
- The Last Command (1955) as Military Governor Juan Bradburn (uncredited)
- Duel on the Mississippi (1955) as Magistrate (uncredited)
- Tennessee's Partner (1955) as Judge Parker
- The Adventures of Fu Manchu (1956) as Professor Rutledge
- Fury at Gunsight Pass (1956) as Doc Phillips
- When Gangland Strikes (1956) as Leo Fantzler
- Quincannon, Frontier Scout (1956) as Col. Harry Conover
- Earth vs. the Flying Saucers (1956) as Brig. Gen. John Hanley
- Down Liberty Road (1956, Short) as Fred Schroder
- Walk the Proud Land (1956) as Gen. Wade
- Death of a Scoundrel (1956) as Capt. LaFarge - Homicide Squad
- The Desperadoes Are in Town (1956) as Mr. Rutherford
- Naked Gun (1956) as Sheriff Jim Jackson
- Drango (1957) as Henry Calder
- Zombies of Mora Tau(1957) as Dr. Jonathan Eggert
- Hell's Crossroads (1957) as Wheeler
- Kronos (1957) as Dr. Albert Stern
- The Giant Claw (1957) as Lt. Gen. Edward Considine
- Beginning of the End (1957) as Gen. John Hanson
- Omar Khayyam (1957) as Imam Nowaffak
- The Power of the Resurrection (1958) as Annas
- Giant from the Unknown (1958) as Dr. Frederick Cleveland
- Young and Wild (1958) as Police Capt. Egan
- How to Make a Monster (1958) as Police Capt. Hancock
- Curse of the Faceless Man (1958) as Narrator (voice, uncredited)
- Badman's Country (1958) as Mayor Coleman
- Twilight for the Gods (1958) as Sea Captain
- The Saga of Hemp Brown (1958) as Bo Slauter
- Tarawa Beachhead (1958) as Chief of Staff, Pearl Harbor (uncredited)
- From the Earth to the Moon (1958) as President Ulysses S. Grant (uncredited)
- Frontier Gun (1958) as Andrew Barton
- Half Human (1958) as Dr. Carl Jordan
- The Little Shepherd of Kingdom Come (1961) as Gen. Lew Wallace (uncredited)
- The Most Dangerous Man Alive (1961) as Capt. Davis
- Tower of London (1962) as The Archbishop (uncredited)
- X: The Man with the X-ray Eyes (1963) as Mr. Bowhead (uncredited)
- Guns of Diablo (1965) as Ray Macklin (final film role)

== Television credits ==
- Amos 'n' Andy (1 episode, 1951) as Judge
- Cowboy G-Men (3 episodes, 1953) as John Calhoun / Judge Jefferson Dixon / Carl Randall
- The Pepsi-Cola Playhouse (1 episode, 1953) as Tom
- The Life and Legend of Wyatt Earp (1 episode, 1955) as Old Man Cullen
- Schlitz Playhouse of Stars (3 episodes, 1953–1955) as Link Bradford / Hendrick Vandorp / Damon Norton / Mark Warren
- Four Star Playhouse (3 episodes, 1955–1956) as Mr. Raymond / Mr. Mason / Warden
- Cavalcade of America (2 episodes, 1953–1956) as Peter Slade / Maj. Gen. C. H. Gerhardt / Gen. Stonewall Jackson
- Science Fiction Theatre (4 episodes, 1955–1956) as Dr. McDermott / Campbell / Dr. Clausen / George Halsey
- You Are There (1 episode, 1956) as Daniel Webster
- Official Detective TV series episode 'Beauty In The Bag' (1957) as Cope
- The Adventures of Jim Bowie (1 episode, 1957) as John McDonogh / Gabriel Durand
- Lassie (1 episode, 1957) as Harry
- Tombstone Territory (2 episodes, 1957 and 1959) as George West / Galeno Mayor
- Sugarfoot (2 episodes, 1957 and 1959) as John Savage / Cash Billings
- Maverick (2 episodes, 1957 and 1960) as Judge Jason Painter / Joshua Haines
- Tales of Wells Fargo (1 episodes, 1957) as Colonel Cole Bryson
- The Veil (1 episode, 1958) as Judge Davis
- Have Gun - Will Travel (1 episode, 1958) as Maxim Bruckner
- U.S. Marshal (in "Good Indian", 1958) as Henry Colt
- Mackenzie's Raiders (2 episodes, 1958-1959) as Dutch Herman / Sergeant Lund
- Sea Hunt (1 episode, 1958) as Earl Tucker - Head of INS
- 26 Men (2 episodes, 1958) as Jeff Hubbard / Miles Young
- The Adventures of Rin Tin Tin (6 episodes, 1955–1958) as Yellow Wolf / Brig. General Jack Lawrence / Chief Red Eagle / Walking Hawk / Long Dog / Millard Austin
- Wagon Train (as Michael Folsom in "The Tobias Jones Story", 1958) as Michael Folsom
- Frontier Doctor (1 episode, 1959) as Colonel Martin Brandt
- Death Valley Days (in "A Bullet for the Captain", 1958) as Major Rogers and (in "The Talking Wire", 1959) as Phillips
- Lawman (in "The Young Toughs", 1959) as Ike Smith
- Bat Masterson (in "A Matter of Honor", 1959) as Judge Dorset
- Markham (in "The Last Bullet", 1959) as Harold Burgess
- Tombstone Territory (2 episodes, 1957–1959) as George West / Galeno Mayor
- Riverboat (in "A Night at Trapper's Landing, 1959) as C.C. Thompson
- Gunsmoke (as Merle in "The Bobsy Twins", 1960) as Merle Finney
- Dennis the Menace (1 episode, 1960) as Minister
- The Man from Blackhawk (1 episode, as Martin Randolph in "Portrait of Cynthia", 1960) as Martin Randolph
- Cheyene (4 episodes, 1956–1961) as Cyrus Dawson / Matt Benedict / John Clements / Ed Roden, Sr.
- Rawhide (2 episodes, 1959–1961) as Doctor Morgan in S3:E11, "Incident of the Broken Word" (1961) / Dr. Tom Jackson
- The Rifleman (2 episodes, 1959–1961) as Jacob Black / Aaron Pelser
- Bronco (5 episodes, 1958–1961) as Gilbert Groves / General Blunt / Dan Peppin / Gen. George Meade / Todd Morgan
- The Barbara Stanwyck Show (as Walter Harwood in "Along the Barbary Coast, 1961)
- Bonanza (as Mr. Mason in "The Gamble", 1962) as Mr. Mason
- Kraft Suspense Theatre (1 episode, 1964) as Chief Austin
- Perry Mason (22 episodes, 1957–1964) as Judge / Judge Bates
