= Mercy Plane =

- Film poster
- Directed by: Richard Harlan
- Written by: William Livley
- Produced by: Ben Judell
- Starring: James Dunn; Frances Gifford; William Pawley; Matty Fain
- Cinematography: Jack Greenhalgh
- Edited by: Holbrook N. Todd
- Music by: David Chudnow
- Production company: Coast Pictures Corp.
- Distributed by: Producers Pictures Corporation
- Release date: December 4, 1939
- Running time: 72 minutes
- Country: United States
- Language: English

Mercy Plane is a 1939 American aviation crime drama film directed by Richard Harlan and starring James Dunn, Frances Gifford, William Pawley, and Matty Fain. The plot involves military aircraft being stolen by "hot plane" thieves, to be re-sold to new owners, with most of the world at war, presumably to war-torn countries. With location filming done at Alhambra Airport, California, the film features numerous aircraft models, including the Lockheed Model 12 Electra Junior as the "Mercy Plane". Lead actor Dunn, a licensed pilot, did his flying in the film.

== Plot ==
Speed Leslie is known as the best pilot on the air racing circuit, but he begins to lose to aviatrix Brenda Gordon when his plane keeps malfunctioning during races. Unbeknownst to Speed and Brenda, her older brother, Big Jim Gordon, is behind the sabotage efforts. Big Jim and his partner, Rocco Wolf, an ace pilot, are in the business of stealing aircraft, and purchasing the Criterion Aircraft factory as a front. Meanwhile, Speed, looking for extra cash to support his flying hobby, applies for a job as a test pilot at the Benson aircraft factory. Benson needs Speed to test his new, top-secret hospital aircraft model called the Mercy Plane, which is said to be able to "land on a dime". Returning to his hangar, Speed runs into Brenda again, who tries to flirt with him while he remains suspicious of her. Brenda gets Speed to take her out to eat at a hamburger joint. Rocco and his protege, Skid, follow them, and after Speed drops off Brenda at her house, they run Speed's jalopy off the road and report the accident as that of a drunk driver. The next day, Brenda comes to bail Speed out of jail, but he refuses to accept her help. Big Jim gives Curly, Speed's mechanic, the money to bail Speed out.

Meanwhile, at five o'clock that morning when Speed was due to test-drive the Mercy Plane, Rocco jumps into the cockpit instead and flies the plane off to a secret location. Speed is accused of the robbery and is stripped of his pilot's license. Determined to clear his name, Speed sneaks into Big Jim's office to search his sales records and also searches the factory premises at night, discovering boxes of aircraft parts waiting for shipment. Rocco and Skid find him there but he manages to outwit them and leaves the two bound and gagged.

Speed convinces Brenda to join him for a test drive and takes the plane far off-course, crashing it in the Sierra Nevada Mountains. The two are unhurt, but Speed pretends that the radio has been damaged and continually cuts off communication with air traffic controllers attempting to pinpoint his location. Brenda wonders why Speed obviously planned the crash, having brought along plenty of food and blankets, and refuses to trust him. After five days during which all search efforts have failed and the pair is assumed dead, Speed finally tells her that his plan is to get her brother to bring the Mercy Plane out of hiding to rescue her. Brenda doesn't believe him, but indeed, Big Jim sends Rocco out to rescue his sister when Speed claims over the "broken" radio that she is badly injured. Big Jim, Rocco, and Skid all arrive at the crash site and land the Mercy Plane easily. When they find out Speed has tricked them, Rocco fatally shoots Big Jim and Big Jim fires back, wounding Rocco. Speed is the only one left who can fly the Mercy Plane back to Los Angeles, where he is removed from all suspicion and his pilot's license restored. After that, he and Brenda are off to get a new license at the marriage license bureau.

== Cast ==
- James Dunn as Speed Leslie
- Frances Gifford as Brenda Gordon
- Matty Fain as Rocco Wolf
- William Pawley as James "Big Jim" Gordon
- Harry Harvey Sr. as Curley
- Forbes Murray as Benson
- Edwin Max as Skid
- Duke York as Joe

== Production ==
The film stars James Dunn and his wife Frances Gifford, who had married in December 1937. Dunn, a licensed pilot, did his own flying in the film.

Production on Mercy Plane began in mid-November 1939, with location photography taking place at Alhambra Airport, California. Aircraft used in the production are:

- Travel Air 4000-Waco RNF c/n 3263, NC853V
- Fisk 11 (archive footage)
- Emsco B7 C c/n 1, NC969Y
- Lockheed Model 12 Electra Junior c/n 1216, NC17342
- Fairchild 24C-8C c/n 2664, NC14792
- Ryan STA c/n 129, NC16040 (in a hangar)
- Aeronca K c/n 209, NC19341

Newsreel footage from the National Air Races of 1933, 1934, and 1936 was used to portray Brenda's races in the film.

Aeromovies notes that Mercy Plane appeared just two years after the disappearance of Amelia Earhart. Gifford's character, who hopes to make a round-the-world flight, remotely resembles that of the lost aviatrix. Aeromovies adds that the Mercy Plane itself, a Lockheed Model 12 Electra Junior, "looks very conventional, but nevertheless has some surprising flight characteristics: barely taken off, it climbs vertically like an F-15 or a Rafale, and lands like a Harrier".

== Release ==
The film was released in 1939. A home video was issued in July 1995.

== Critical reception ==
The Boston Globe called Dunn's performance "a first rate portrayal of an ingratiating pilot who becomes involved, innocently of course, with a murderous gang who steal planes as other thieves steal automobiles..." Miller called Gifford "stylishly attractive". Hischak wrote that "the romantic scenes are as awkward as the plot but some of the aerial sequences are worth seeing". Parish and Pitts said the film is "hampered by shoddy special effects".

== Sources ==
- Hischak, Thomas S. (2017). 1939: Hollywood's Greatest Year. Rowman & Littlefield. ISBN 9781442278059.
- Miller, Don (1973). 'B" Movies: An informal survey of the American low-budget film, 1933-1945. Curtis Books.
- Parish, James Robert; Pitts, Michael R. (1986). The Great Spy Pictures II. Scarecrow Press. ISBN 9780810819139.
- Pendo, Stephen (1985). Aviation in the Cinema. Scarecrow Press. ISBN 9780810817463.
