= Jeff Foxworthy discography =

- Studio albums: 6
- Compilation albums: 9
- Singles: 7
- Music videos: 8

American stand-up comedian Jeff Foxworthy has released eight albums. Foxworthy has also released several singles which have consisted of his comedy sketches set to music, often with a chorus sung by another country music act or studio musician. Most of these are from his 1996 compilation Crank It Up: The Music Album, although several of his comedy albums have included one musical track as well. Several of these songs have charted on the Billboard Hot Country Singles & Tracks (now Hot Country Songs) charts, the most successful being "Redneck 12 Days of Christmas" in 1996.

== Studio albums ==
=== 1990s ===
Title	Album details	Peak chart positions				Certifications (sales threshold)
Title	Album details	US Country	US	US Heat	CAN Country	Certifications (sales threshold)
You Might Be a Redneck If…	Release date: June 15, 1993; Label: Warner Bros. Nashville	3	38	1	—	US: 3× Platinum; CAN: Platinum
Games Rednecks Play	Release date: July 18, 1995; Label: Warner Bros. Nashville	2	8	—	6	US: 3× Platinum; CAN: Platinum
Crank It Up: The Music Album	Release date: August 27, 1996; Label: Warner Bros. Nashville	3	21	—	—	US: Platinum; CAN: Gold
Totally Committed	Release date: May 19, 1998; Label: Warner Bros. Nashville	8	50	—	21	US: Gold
"—" denotes releases that did not chart

=== 2000s & 2010s ===
Title	Album details	Peak chart positions		
Title	Album details	US Country	US	US Comedy
Big Funny^{[A]}	Release date: April 25, 2000; Label: DreamWorks Nashville	15	143	—
Have Your Loved Ones Spayed or Neutered	Release date: July 6, 2004; Label: Warner Bros. Nashville	7	47	5
Them Idiots: Whirled Tour (with Bill Engvall and Larry the Cable Guy)	Release date: March 13, 2012; Label: Warner Bros. Nashville	45	—	1
We've Been Thinking (with Larry the Cable Guy)	Release date: September 29, 2017; Label: Comedy Dynamics, Netflix	—	—	—
"—" denotes releases that did not chart

== Compilation albums ==
Title	Album details	Peak chart positions			Certifications (sales threshold)
Title	Album details	US Country	US	US Comedy	Certifications (sales threshold)
Redneck Test: Vol. 11	Release date: August 26, 1994; Label: Laughing Hyena Entertainment	—	—	—	
King of the Rednecks	Release date: March 30, 1995; Label: Laughing Hyena Entertainment	—	—	—	
You Might Be a Redneck, Vol. 10	Release date: March 30, 1995; Label: Laughing Hyena Entertainment	—	—	—	
Redneck Test: Vol. 43	Release date: March 30, 1995; Label: Laughing Hyena Entertainment	19	155	—	
Jeff Foxworthy: Sold Out Volume 80	Release date: March 30, 1995; Label: Laughing Hyena Entertainment	35	—	—	
Jeff Foxworthy: The Original Volume 79	Release date: March 30, 1995; Label: Laughing Hyena Entertainment	27	184	—	
Live, Vol. 9	Release date: May 27, 1996; Label: Laughing Hyena Entertainment	53	—	—	
Greatest Bits	Release date: October 12, 1999; Label: Warner Bros. Records	17	189	—	US: Gold
Best of Jeff Foxworthy: Double Wide, Single Minded	Release date: September 2, 2003; Label: Rhino Entertainment	10	76	1	
"—" denotes releases that did not chart

== Box sets ==
Title	Album details
The Ultimate Jeff Foxworthy Gift Collection	Release date: November 5, 1996; Label: Warner Bros. Records

== Singles ==
Year	Single	Peak chart positions			Album
Year	Single	US Country	US	CAN Country	Album
1994	"Redneck Stomp"	67	75	—	Crank It Up: The Music Album
1995	"Party All Night" (with Little Texas and Scott Rouse)	53	—^{A}	—	Games Rednecks Play
1996	"Redneck Games" (with Alan Jackson)	42	66	79	Crank It Up: The Music Album
1998	"Totally Committed"	70	—	—	Totally Committed
1999	"It's OK That I'm This Way"	—	—	—	Greatest Bits
2000	"Blue Collar Dollar" (with Bill Engvall and Marty Stuart)	63	—	—	Big Funny
"—" denotes releases that did not chart

- ^{A}"Party All Night" peaked at number 1 on Bubbling Under Hot 100 Singles.

== Other singles ==
=== Christmas songs ===
Year	Single	Peak positions	Album
Year	Single	US Country	Album
1995	"Redneck 12 Days of Christmas"	18	Crank It Up: The Music Album
1996	"Redneck 12 Days of Christmas" (re-entry)	39	Crank It Up: The Music Album
1997	"Redneck 12 Days of Christmas" (re-entry)	39	Crank It Up: The Music Album
1997	"'Twas the Night After Christmas"	67	Crank It Up: The Music Album
1998	"Redneck 12 Days of Christmas" (re-entry)	37	Crank It Up: The Music Album
1999	"Redneck 12 Days of Christmas" (re-entry)	35	Crank It Up: The Music Album

== Videography ==
=== Music videos ===
Year	Video	Director
1994	"Redneck Stomp"	"Weird Al" Yankovic
1995	"Party All Night" (with Little Texas)	"Weird Al" Yankovic
1995	"I Don't Even Know Your Name" (with Alan Jackson)	Piers Plowden
1995	"Redneck 12 Days of Christmas"	Michael McNamara
1996	"Redneck Games" (with Alan Jackson)	Coke Sams
1998	"Totally Committed"	Peter Zavadil
2000	"Blue Collar Dollar" (with Bill Engvall and Marty Stuart)	Thomas Smugala
2004	"Have Your Loved Ones Spayed or Neutered"	

== Notes ==
- A Big Funny also peaked at number 30 on the Canadian RPM Country Albums chart.
