= Hollywood Zombies =

Trading card series

- Logo
- Type: Trading cards
- Company: Topps
- Country: United States
- Availability: 2007–2007

Hollywood Zombies was a trading card series produced by Topps and released in 2007, portraying American celebrities at the time as human flesh-eating zombies. The series was available only in select comic book stores and two home video stores, Suncoast Motion Picture Company and FYE.

Among the many commercial artists and illustrators contributing to this series were Layron DeJarnette, Drew Friedman, Jay Lynch, Hermann Mejia and John Zeleznik. A number of the writers and artists had previously worked on either the Wacky Packages and Garbage Pail Kids trading card series or Mad magazine.

== Cancelled comic book adaptation ==
A comic book based on the cards was planned by IDW Publishing, but it was never made. Whether it would have been an ongoing series, a limited series, or a one-shot is unknown.
