= Tom Bunk =

German cartoonist (1945–2026)

- Born: Tomas Maria Bunk; 17 December 1945 Split, PR Croatia, FPR Yugoslavia
- Died: 15 November 2026 (aged 80)
- Areas: Cartoonist, painter, graphic artist
- Notable works: Garbage Pail Kids, Wacky Packages, Mad magazine, Quantoons

Tomas Maria Bunk (17 December 1945 – 15 November 2026) was a German cartoonist known for adding multiple extraneous details to his posters, cartoons and illustrations created for both American and German publishers.

== Life and career ==
Tomas Maria Bunk was born on 17 December 1945. In 1973, he moved to Berlin, where he began rendering humorous subjects in oil paintings. After selling these paintings in three successful shows, he turned to cartooning and contributed to underground comics in 1976.

His cartoon creations appeared in the 1970s in the satirical German magazine pardon, and in other European magazines and anthologies. After collecting his comics in three books, he moved to New York in 1983 and began working for Raw, the graphic story magazine edited and published by Françoise Mouly and Art Spiegelman. He created Topps trading cards, including Wacky Packages and Garbage Pail Kids. In 1990, he became a regular Mad cartoonist, and his contributions have led some to regard his work as a continuation of Will Elder's cartoons.

He illustrated humorous and surreal oil paintings and graphics of absurd situations and subjects, explaining, "In my paintings, I am interested in telling a story. I like the story to be open ended and enigmatic. It should have an internal truth, which the viewer will recognize in his/her own way. As elements in my storytelling, I use symbols and their arrangement. I like everyday objects to have a meaning beyond the obvious, a metaphysical meaning. When I paint I try to keep a balance between my intellect, my intuition and my ever present humoristic approach. In this way I keep the painting always interesting and alive for me. This is also what I would like the painting to be for the viewer, a stimulating and entertaining puzzle."

In 2015 he was presented with a Lifetime Work Achievement Award at the Munich Comic Festival, and the Reuben Divisional Award for best cartoonist in 2018 in the United States.

Bunk lived and worked in New Rochelle, New York. He died on 15 November 2026, at the age of 80.
