= DeJarnette =

DeJarnette is a surname. Notable people with the surname include:

- Daniel Coleman DeJarnette Sr. (1822–1881), prominent Virginia politician
- David L. DeJarnette (1907–1991), archaeologist
- Edmund DeJarnette (1897–1966), Member of the Virginia House of Delegates
- Edmund DeJarnette (1938–2015), ambassador
- Evelyn Magruder DeJarnette (1842–1902), American author
- Joseph DeJarnette (1866–1957), the director of Western State Hospital (located in Staunton, Virginia) from 1905 to 1943
- Layron DeJarnette (fl. 2000s–2010s), illustrator

== See also ==
- DeJarnette's Tavern, nationally registered historic place near Nathalie, Halifax County, Virginia, USA
- DeJarnette, Virginia, unincorporated community in Caroline County, in the U.S. state of Virginia
