= Greatest Bits =

Compilation album by Jeff Foxworthy
- Released: October 12, 1999
- Recorded: 1992–1998
- Genre: Comedy
- Length: 43:07
- Label: Warner Bros.
- Producer: Jeff Foxworthy; Doug Grau; Scott Rouse; J. P. Williams

Jeff Foxworthy chronology
Totally Committed (1998)	Greatest Bits (1999)	Big Funny (2000)

Greatest Bits is a compilation album by American comedian Jeff Foxworthy. It was released by Warner Bros. Records on October 12, 1999. The album peaked at number 189 on the Billboard 200 chart and has been certified Gold by the RIAA.

As of 2014, sales in the United States have exceeded 689,000 copies, according to Nielsen SoundScan.

== Track listing ==
1. "It's OK That I'm This Way" – 3:47
2. "Rednecks and Shiny Stuff" – 0:22
3. "Commemorative Plates" – 0:33
4. "Rednecks Play the Lottery" – 0:18
5. "Bubble Wrap" – 0:23
6. "Super-Size Them Fries" – 0:21
7. "You Might Be a Redneck If…" – 4:28
8. "Redneck Stomp" – 2:58
9. "First Single's Apartment" – 1:56
10. "The Security Deposit" – 0:18
11. "The Morning After" – 0:32
12. "She Has a Boyfriend" – 0:39
13. "I Need Some Space" – 0:43
14. "Party All Night" – 3:05
  - with Little Texas and Scott Rouse
15. "Men's/Women's Magazines" – 0:30
16. "Bikini Season" – 0:26
17. "You Will Get Remarried" – 0:47
18. "Totally Committed (Edit)" – 3:10
19. "Clampetts Go to Maui" – 3:58
20. "Howdy from Maui" – 2:38
  - with The Beach Boys and Los Straitjackets
21. "I'm from Georgia" – 0:15
22. "Words in the South" – 0:38
23. "My Favorite Southern Word" – 0:19
24. "NASA & Alabama" – 1:52
25. "Southern Accent" – 2:24
26. "Redneck Games" – 3:26
  - with Alan Jackson
27. "Redneck 12 Days of Christmas" – 2:21
  - parody of "The Twelve Days of Christmas"

== Chart performance ==
Chart (1999)	Peak position
U.S. Billboard Top Country Albums	17
U.S. Billboard 200	189

== Certifications ==
Region	Certification	Certified units/sales
United States (RIAA)	Gold	500,000^{^}
^{^} Shipments figures based on certification alone.
