= Double Wide =

Double-wide or Double Wide may refer to:

- Double-wide, a style of mobile home
- Double Wide (album), debut studio album by American recording artist Uncle Kracker
- Double Wide, a fictional character on the Adult Swim television series Stroker & Hoop
- Double Wide, a contemporary western crime novel written by Leo W. Banks and published by Brash Books

== See also ==
- or
- or
- Best of Jeff Foxworthy: Double Wide, Single Minded, a 2004 comedy album by Jeff Foxworthy
- Southside Double-Wide: Acoustic Live, a 2004 album by Sevendust
- "Double Wide Dream", a single on the 2011 album Double-Wide Dream by Casey Donahew
- "Double Wide Paradise", a single on the 1997 album Dream Walkin' by Toby Keith
