= Joe Simko =

American illustrator

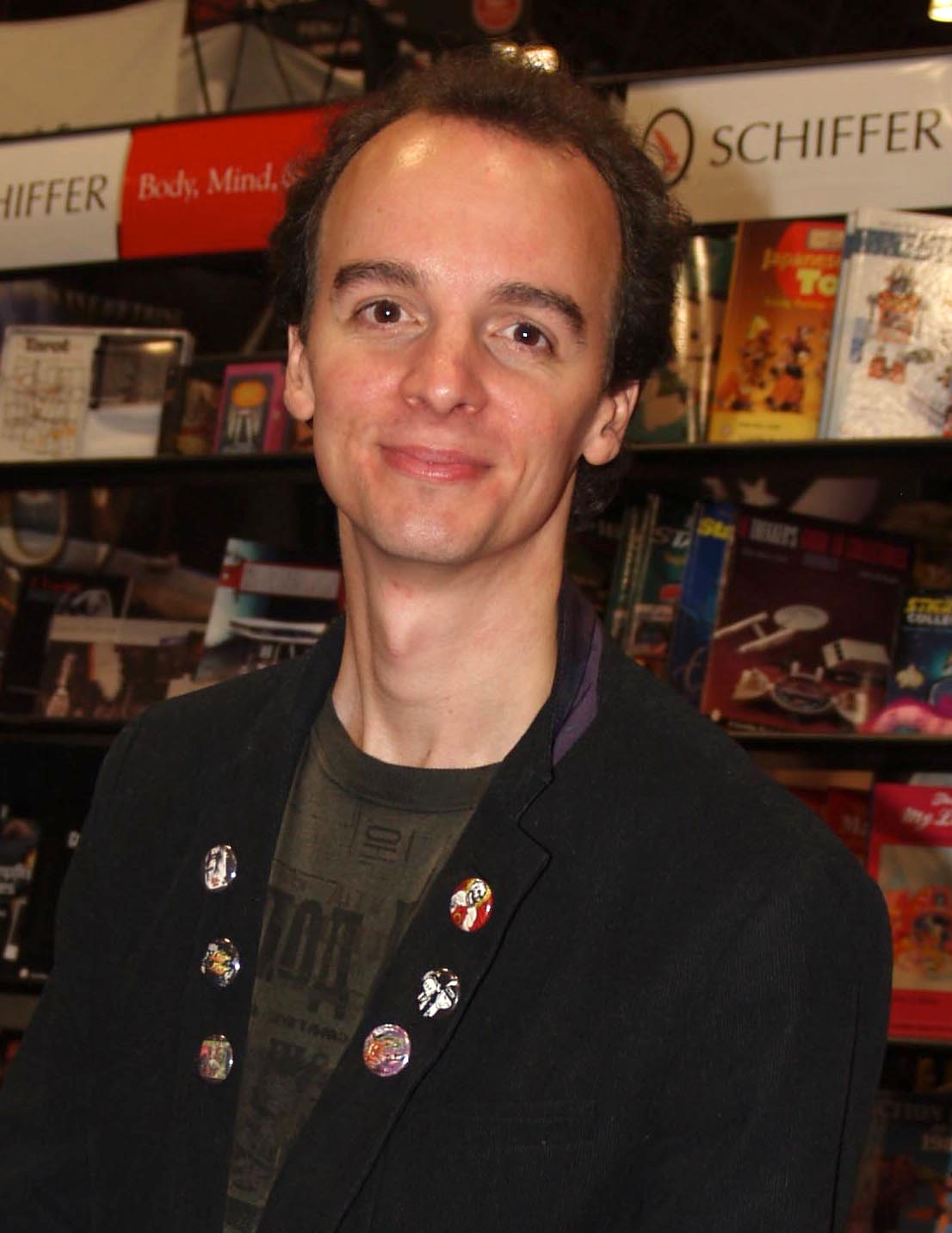
- Simko at the New York Comic Con
- Occupation: Illustrator
- Known for: Garbage Pail Kids; The Sweet Rot; Craniacs

Joe Simko is a New York City based illustrator who is contributing as a current lead artist/writer to Topps’ Garbage Pail Kids and Wacky Packages trading cards. He is the producer and co-director of the Garbage Pail Kids documentary film, 30 Years of Garbage. Illustrator/author of the book series, The Sweet Rot, and has designed artwork for bands, creating album covers, tour posters and concert shirts for such acts as Metallica, Gwar, Misfits, The Vans Warped Tour, etc. His project Cereal Killers Trading Cards, 1st Series was released May 2, 2011. The Cereal Killers cards spoof breakfast cereals with popular horror films. Joe wrote and painted all 55 cards for the first and second set and launched the series through his company, Wax Eye. 2nd Series was released through Wax Eye in June 2012.

He is the creator of Craniacs with former Topps senior VP executive Ira Friedman. Craniacs is an all-ages trading card series and is currently in development with Titmouse, Inc for an animated television series.

== Early life ==
Joe Simko was born in Meadowbrooke, PA, and raised in Southampton, Pennsylvania. He graduated from the School of Visual Arts in New York City in 1999 with a Bachelor of Fine Arts in Cartooning. He was the very first recipient of the now annual Joe Orlando memorial award from his graduating department that year. Among Simko’s instructors at the School of Visual Arts were Joe Orlando (VP of DC Comics and associate editor of Mad), Klaus Jansen, Sal Almendola, and Carmine Infantino.

== Career ==
After graduating from the School of Visual Arts, Simko held a full-time position as an artist for men’s neckwear, creating design pieces for ties. In 2000 Simko was hired as a full-time, in-house storyboard artist for national television commercials at GEM Studios in New York City, creating storyboard illustrations for top NYC ad agencies such as J Walter Thompson, BBDO, DDB, etc.

At this time he also did freelance jobs designing show posters for local New York City bands. This freelance work gained some notice, and he began working for higher profile groups. In 2006, he designed all of the artwork for the large traveling rock tour, The Vans Warped Tour. In 2007, a Japanese rock festival commissioned him to design all the artwork for their tour and oversee all the art direction as the managing artist. Two 20 feet (6.1 m) tall inflatable monsters based on Simko's character designs were also created for the Japan Rock concerts.

Simko has created artwork for clients and organizations including Topps, Abrams Books, Reed Pop, FYE (retailer), IDW Publishing, Dynamite Entertainment, iam8bit, Southern Tier Brewing Company, Ride Snowboards, Sims Snowboards, Outlook Skateboards, The Gotham Girls Roller Derby League, Fangoria Magazine, New York Hardcore Tattoos, Spooky Empire's Ultimate Horror Weekend, Monster Mania, JLO Hangtag for Andy Hilfiger, and the NYC clothing boutique Live Fast.

His list of musical clients includes Metallica, The Misfits, Gwar, Less Than Jake, Trivium, Murphy's Law, Dwarves, Sonic Youth, Good Riddance, The Undead, Peelander Z, and others.

In 2006, a Simko designed shirt was used in the film Nick and Norah’s Infinite Playlist. The shirt was originally designed for the NYC store Live Fast.

2009, Simko began his current career as writer/illustrator for the Topps Garbage Pail Kids and Wacky Packages brands, designing artworks for trading cards and licensed products.

2010, Simko launched The Sweet Rot book series as author and illustrator. An original story showcasing a group of wildly eccentric little kids also known as "little rotters" in the make-believe town of Pollilop Drop, The Sweet Rot is published by Schiffer Books.

In 2011, Simko and his wife June Gonzales launched Wax Eye, a pop cultured art based company. The company has released three trading card series to date: Cereal Killers series 1, Cereal Killers series 2, and Stupid Heroes; as well as a mobile app game Cereal Boom; and a T-shirt line based on the Cereal Killers brand.

In 2014, Simko formed the independent film production company Peel Here Productions, along with partners June Gonzales and Jeff Zapata. Under this film company, they have released the documentary film based on the Garbage Pail Kids phenomenon titled 30 Years of Garbage: The Garbage Pail Kids Story.

2022, Simko co-produced a series of GPK stop-motion animated shorts directed by animation company Jamroll Studios. He later developed the GPK animated short film Mad Mike: Fury Load written by Adam F. Goldberg, producer/creator of ABC's The Goldbergs.

In 2023, Simko designed a series of promotional character paintings and cereal box prop artwork for the Sci-Fi film Divinity, directed by Eddie Alcazar and produced by Steven Soderbergh. The same year, Simko co-created CRANIACS with former Topps senior exec Ira Friedman, under their company IFE. The Craniacs IP made their debut in the form of a series of trading cards released in hobby stores nationwide in the fall of 2023.

Simko's continued work with the Garbage Pail Kids brand has led him to work on continued licensed products, including designing artwork for GPK x Stranger Things toys. He's designed artwork for GPK cereal, a cookbook, pop-up book and has worked with major children's book author R.L. Stine designing book covers for a series of GPK chapter books written by Stine.

== Artwork for rock music festivals ==
- MAGMA – 2007, 2008
- Vans Warped Tour – 2006
- Superbowl of Hardcore – 2006, 2007, 2008
- Medusa Festival – 1 through 5 (2003 through 2006)

== Published artwork ==
- Craniacs - comic book series, Penciler and Inker, published by "Titan Comics" - 2025/2026
- "Garbage Pail Kids" - trading cards, Writer and Illustrator, published by "Topps" - Current Ongoing
- Craniacs - Trading Card series, Writer and Illustrator, published by IFE - - Current Ongoing
- Garbage Pail Kids Pop-Up book - Writer and illustrator, published by Insight Editions - 2023
- Garbage Pail Kids Cookbook - 2022
- Madballs vs. Garbage Pail Kids comic book cover art - Dynamite Comics - Issues #1-4 - 2022
- Garbage Pail Kids book series cover artist, written by R.L. Stine - 2020, 2021
- Series of Garbage Pail Kids comic books - IDW - 2014
- One-off sketch cards for the 2012 Mars Attacks! Heritage trading card series - 2012
- Alternative Movie Posters: Film Art from the Underground, Schiffer Books - Fall 2013
- The Sweet Rot, Book 3, (The Purple Meltdown) - Schiffer Books - Spring 2012
- The Sweet Rot, Book 2, (Raiders of the Lost Art) - Schiffer Books - Fall 2011
- The Sweet Rot – Schiffer Books - Spring 2010 (creator, illustrator, writer)
- In Sunlight and In Shadow, 2009 (illustrator)
- Revolver magazine, 2009
- Roller Derby Art, Schiffer Books
- Doll magazine – June 2007
- Revolver – March 2007
- The Art of Modern Rock mini A-Z. Chronicle Books
- Skinnie magazine – November 2006
- Stephen Baldwin’s Spirit Warriors, graphic novel series, B&H Books (creator, illustrator)
- Blood and Thunder magazine – Winter 2006
- Spin magazine – spring 2006
- The Art of Modern Rock, Chronicle Books
- The Art of Electric Frankenstein, Dark Horse – February 2004

== Art shows ==
=== 2014 ===
- Dave Brockie Memorial Art Show - MF Gallery (BKYLN, NY)- May 2014
- Comix Art Gallery Opening - Group show - Comix Art Gallery (Los Angeles, CA) - Feb. 2014

=== 2013 ===
- Neon Graveyard - Solo Exhibition – TT Underground Gallery @ Toy Tokyo (NYC) – June 2013
- MF Gallery's 10th Anniversary Art Show (BKYLN, NY)- June 2013

=== 2012 ===
- MF Gallery 10th Annual Halloween Art Show (BKYLN, NY)- Oct. 2011

=== 2011 ===
- WWA - Sweet Streets "American 80's in Japan" - (CA) Nov. 2011
- MF Gallery 9th Annual Halloween Art Show (BKYLN, NY) - Oct. 2011
- D****Y Group Art Show - MF Gallery (Brooklyn, NY) - January 2011

=== 2010 ===
- Fangoria Magazine's Halloween Art show - G2 Gallery/Lounge (NYC) - October 2010
- MF Gallery's 8th Annual Halloween Art show (Genova, Italy) - October 2010
- I Need Your Skull Show - MF Gallery (Genova, Italy) - September 2010
- Skateboard Group Art Show - G2 (NYC) - July 2010
- The Civil War & Founding Fathers Custom Qee Show - Spaghetti Project (Fredericksburg, VA) - July 2010
- The Sweet Rot Book Release – TT Underground Gallery @ Toy Tokyo (NYC) – June 2010
- Zombies Attack Brooklyn - MF Gallery (Brooklyn, NY) - June 2010
- I Need Your Skull Show - MF Gallery (Brooklyn, NY) - May 2010
- G2 Opening – G2 Gallery Lounge (NYC) – April 2010

=== 2009 ===
- Naughty and Nice show – Parlor Gallery (NJ) – Dec. 2009
- Return of the Living Decks – Ave. A (NYC) – Oct. 2009
- MF Gallery’s 7th Annual Halloween Art Show (NYC) – Oct. 2009
- Spooky Empire’s Ultimate Horror Weekend – (Orlando, FL) – Oct. 2009
- Closing Art Exhibition – Live Fast Underground Gallery (NYC) – Sept. 2009
- Tatto Art Show – MF Gallery (Genova, Italy) – Sept. 2009
- Kings of Pop – Ave. A (NYC) – August 2009
- The Art of Simko -Solo Exhibition – Live Fast Underground Gallery (NYC) – Aug. 2009
- The Punk Rot Art of Joe Simko - Solo Exhibition - ITM Lounge (NYC) – June 2009
- Night of the Living Decks – Ave. A (NYC) – June 2009
- MF Gallery Show at Asbury Lanes (NJ) – May 2009
- Welcome to Our Nightmare - Don Pedro’s (Brooklyn, NY) – March 2009
- Stitch Custom Vinyl Show – Showroom Gallery NYC (Hong Kong, Hawaii) – Feb. 2009

=== 2008 ===
- Vicious Intent Poster Show – Showroom Gallery (NYC) – Sept. 2008
- Halloween Art Show – ITM Lounge (NYC) – Sept. 2008
- NYC Tribute Art Show – Ave. A (NYC) - Sept. 2008
- Paint It! – MF Gallery (NYC) – June 2008
- Sci-Fi Art Show – MF Gallery (NYC) – Jan. 2008

=== 2007 ===
- Skateboard Art show – Ave. A (NYC) - August 2007
- Creepy Carnival – MF Gallery (NYC) - August 2007
- Bart Simpson Custom Vinyl Show–ShowroomGallery (NYC, Japan, China) Summer 2007
- Zombies Attack! – MF Gallery (NYC)– April - 2007

=== 2006 ===
- The Skull Show – The Back Alley Gallery (Minneapolis, MN) – May 2006
- Girls, Girls, Girls – (Live Body Painting Exhibition) MF Gallery (NYC) –April 2006
- Live Body Painting Exhibition – Live Fast (NYC) – March 2006
- Zombie Art Show – MF Gallery (NYC) – January 2006

=== 2005 ===
- The Throne Show – Lulubell Toy Bodega (Tuscan, AZ) – November 2005
- Halloween Art Show – MF Gallery (NYC) – September 2005
- Live Fast - Store opening/Mural exhibition (NYC) – Summer 2005
- Graphic Noise Poster Show – Museum of Design (Atlanta, GA) – Summer 2005
- Funny Club Show - Rotifugi(Chicago), Munky King (CA), Pixie Gallery (Taiwan) – Spring

=== 2004 ===
- Electric Frankenstein Poster Art – CBGB’s Gallery (NYC) – Summer 2004
- The Art of Musical Maintenance – The Goodfoot (Portland, OR) – July 2004

=== 2000 ===
- CBGB’s Gallery – (NYC) – May 2000

=== 1999 ===
- Solo Exhibition - Gray Parrot Café – (Brooklyn, NY) – 1999
- Society of Illustrators Group show (NYC) - 1999
