= Crank It Up: The Music Album =

Studio album by Jeff Foxworthy
- Released: August 27, 1996
- Recorded: Summer 1994 – fall 1995
- Genre: Comedy, country
- Label: Warner Bros.
- Producer: Scott Rouse; Doug Grau

Jeff Foxworthy chronology
Games Rednecks Play (1995)	Crank It Up: The Music Album (1996)	Totally Committed (1998)

Crank It Up: The Music Album is the first musical album recorded by Jeff Foxworthy. It features many of Foxworthy's skits set to music, primarily with choruses sung by other musicians. Two comedy sketches, "S. I. N. G. L. E." and "Still More You Might Be a Redneck If…", are also featured.

The concept for the album was devised after the release of Foxworthy's first album, You Might Be a Redneck If.... Doug Grau, Foxworthy's A&R representative at Warner Bros. Records, was contacted by Warner Bros' music video department about creating a music video for the album. Grau was inspired by the works of Dickie Goodman to edit Foxworthy's stand-up material over the top of a music bed. Record producer Scott Rouse was then hired to develop the musical beds. The first song, "Redneck Stomp", premiered on CMT in the summer of 1994, with a music video directed by Al Yankovic. The music video for "Redneck Stomp" is accredited with propelling You Might Be a Redneck If...'s sales from 200,000 to 2 million. A second video, "Party All Night", was quickly produced, and rose to the top of CMT's music video charts. The success of these two music videos led to a complete album of Foxworthy's "music comedy" to be released in 1996.

"Redneck Stomp", "Redneck Games", "Redneck 12 Days of Christmas", and "'Twas the Night After Christmas" all charted on the Hot Country Songs charts between 1995 and 1996. "Redneck 12 Days of Christmas" was the highest-charting, reaching No. 18 in early 1996 and re-charting several times for each subsequent Christmas until 2000.

Professional ratings
Review scores
Source	Rating
Allmusic	link

== Track listing ==
1. "Redneck Stomp" (Jeff Foxworthy, Scott Rouse) – 2:58
2. "S.I.N.G.L.E." (Foxworthy) – 4:01^{A}
3. "Party All Night" (Foxworthy, S. Rouse) – 3:05
  - feat. Little Texas and Scott Rouse
4. "Redneck Games" (Foxworthy, S. Rouse, Ronnie Scaife) – 3:27
  - feat. Alan Jackson
5. "Big O' Moon" (Foxworthy, S. Rouse, Dr. Jim Rouse) – 2:24
  - feat. Mac Wiseman and Del McCoury
6. "Redneck 12 Days of Christmas" (Foxworthy, Tim Wilson)^{B} – 2:21
  - parody of "The Twelve Days of Christmas"
7. "Pure Bred Redneck" (Foxworthy, Buddy Causey, Dana Sigmon, Glenn Ashworth) – 3:04
  - feat. Cooter Brown
8. "Let Me Drive" (Foxworthy, S. Rouse, Dave MacKenzie) – 3:10
  - feat. Dave MacKenzie
9. "Copenhagen" (Robert Earl Keen) – 2:16
10. "Howdy from Maui" (Foxworthy, S. Rouse, Scaife) – 2:37
  - feat. The Beach Boys and Los Straitjackets
11. "'Twas the Night After Christmas" (Foxworthy, S. Rouse, Doug Grau) – 3:12
  - parody of "A Visit from St. Nicholas"
12. "Still More You Might Be a Redneck If…" (Jeff Foxworthy) – 2:57^{A}
- ^{A}Comedy skit
- ^{B}Original parody composed by Foxworthy and Wilson; additional words by Foxworthy, Rouse, Grau

== Personnel ==
As listed in liner notes.

- Danny Amis – electric guitar
- Eddie Angel – electric guitar
- Eddie Bayers – drums
- Mike Brignardello – bass guitar
- Mike Bub – acoustic bass guitar
- Jason Carter – fiddle
- Dan Dugmore – pedal steel guitar
- Glen Duncan – fiddle
- Terry Eldredge – acoustic guitar
- E. Scott Esbeck – bass guitar
- Shannon Forrest – drums
- Paul Franklin – pedal steel guitar
- Mike Geiger – acoustic guitar
- Rob Hajacos – fiddle
- Owen Hale – drums
- Byron House – bass guitar
- Mitch Humphries – piano
- Kirk "Jelly Roll" Johnson – harmonica
- Jeff King – electric guitar
- L. J. Lester – drums
- Chris Leuzinger – electric guitar, acoustic guitar
- Gary Lunn – bass guitar
- Dave MacKenzie – slide guitar
- Liana Manis – vocals
- Rob McCoury – banjo
- Ronnie McCoury – mandolin
- Hargus "Pig" Robbins – piano
- Scott Rouse – drums, bass guitar, electric guitar, slide guitar, acoustic guitar, piano, harmonica, vocals, "everything else"
- John Wesley Ryles – vocals
- Mike Severs – electric guitar
- Eric Silver – fiddle, banjo
- Lisa Silver – vocals
- Joe Spivey – fiddle
- Robby Turner – pedal steel guitar
- John Willis – electric guitar, acoustic guitar
- Dennis Wilson – vocals
- Gene Wooten – Dobro
- Glenn Worf – bass guitar

Production

- Scott Rouse – all tracks except 2 and 12
- Doug Grau – tracks 2, 6, 7, 9, 11, 12
- Original Cooter Brown version of "Pure Bred Redneck" produced by Joe Scaife and Jim Cotton

== Charts ==
=== Weekly charts ===
Chart (1996)	Peak position
US Billboard 200	21
US Top Country Albums (Billboard)	3

=== Year-end charts ===
Chart (1996)	Position
US Top Country Albums (Billboard)	44
Chart (1997)	Position
US Top Country Albums (Billboard)	37

As of 2014, sales in the United States have exceeded 715,000 copies, according to Nielsen SoundScan.
