= Garbage Pail Kids =

Sticker trading cards

- Adam Bomb (Series 1 #8a) became an icon of the Garbage Pail Kids trading card franchise; the image was used on the first five series' packs.
- Type: Trading cards
- Invented by: Art Spiegelman; Mark Newgarden; John Pound
- Company: The Topps Company
- Country: United States
- Availability: 1985–2007
- Official website

Garbage Pail Kids is a series of sticker trading cards produced by Topps, originally released in 1985 and designed to parody the Cabbage Patch Kids dolls, which were popular at the time.

Each sticker card features a Garbage Pail Kid character having some comical abnormality or deformity, or suffering a terrible fate or death. The characters have humorous names involving word play (Adam Bomb) or alliteration (Blasted Billy). Two versions of each card were produced, with variations featuring the same artwork but a different character name, differentiated by an "a" or "b" letter following the card number. The sticker fronts are die-cut so that just the character with its nameplate and the GPK logo can be peeled from the backing. Many of the card backs feature puzzle pieces that form giant murals, while other flip-side subjects vary greatly among the various series, from humorous licenses and awards to comic strips and, in more recent releases, humorous Facebook profiles.

Fifteen original series (OS) of regular trading cards were released in the United States, with various sets released in other countries. Two large-format card editions were also released, as well as a set of fold-out posters. All-New Series (ANS) sets were introduced in 2003, Flashback re-releases began in 2010 and a Brand-New Series (BNS) was announced for 2012 with Brand New Series 2, Chrome S1, and BNS3 following in 2013. A new format was released in 2014 using the year to designate the edition, followed by the release name of Series 1, which had an Olympics-style format. In 2016, the format was changed again to themed sets that spoofed different pop culture topics.

== History ==
The series was the brainchild of cartoonist Art Spiegelman, then a consultant for Topps. He came up with the product idea after the success of his earlier creations, Garbage Can-dy and Wacky Packages. The concept originally began as an unreleased Wacky Packages sticker for a 1985 series, but the management at Topps thought it would be a good idea for a separate spin-off series. Spiegelman and fellow cartoonist Mark Newgarden worked together as the editors and art directors of the project, Len Brown was the manager and the first run of the cards was illustrated exclusively by artist John Pound. They were first issued in 1985. Following the initial success of the cards, several additional artists and writers were brought in to contribute to the series, including Jay Lynch, Tom Bunk and James Warhola, among others.

== International versions ==
The cards were also known as Bukimi Kun [ぶきみくん/Mr. Creepy] in Japan, The Garbage Gang in Australia and New Zealand, La Pandilla Basura [The Garbage Gang] in Spain, Havurat Ha-Zevel [חבורת הזבל/The Garbage Gang] in Israel, Basuritas [Trashlings] in Latin America, Gang do Lixo/Loucomania [Trash Gang/Crazymania] in Brazil, Sgorbions [Snotlings] in Italy, Les Crados [The Filthies] in France and Belgium and Die total kaputten Kids [The Totally Broken Kids] in Germany and other German speaking countries, e.g. Austria.

=== Variations ===
A smaller-sized card format was released in Australia and New Zealand. Each pack contained three stickers and the "peel here" arrow pointed to the top left area since there was no die-cut scoring. Initially in New Zealand, a Series 6 of the Garbage Pail Kids was released as a market test (this version was a mix of the United States Series 6 and 7). After this success, Series 1 was released in Australia and New Zealand known as The Garbage Gang and was identical to the United States version (although smaller in size). The first series was released in Australia and New Zealand in 1989 with different versions: the Australian stickers were darker, had a different banner and some of the names were changed to reflect cultural differences. From Series 2 onward, the same version was released in Australia and New Zealand. Series 4 was the last release of The Garbage Gang.

== Commercial success ==
The commercial success of the cards led to the production of a live action film, The Garbage Pail Kids Movie, in 1987. An animated TV series was also created in 1987, but its initial scheduled broadcast in the U.S. was postponed due to parental complaints. The TV series did make a brief appearance on U.S. television years after it was originally intended to air and was also briefly aired in Europe. The film was released on DVD by MGM Home Entertainment on July 12, 2005 (the original VHS had been distributed by Paramount), and the animated TV series was later also released on DVD by CBS Home Entertainment on April 4, 2006 (which was, again, distributed by Paramount). A similar set of 160 trading cards, called The Sloppy Slobs, was released in Italy in 1993.

== Controversies and lawsuit ==
=== School ban ===
During the height of the cards' popularity, Garbage Pail Kids were banned in many schools. One of the main reasons for the ban was that teachers cited them as distractions during class.

=== Mexican ban ===
Since 1988, any export and import of Garbage Pail Kids is banned in Mexico due to the approval of a reform to the Export and Import Law, banning all representations of minors "in a degrading or ridiculous manner, in attitudes of incitement to violence, self-destruction or in any other form of antisocial behavior", citing Garbage Pail Kids as an example.

They are also prohibited from being imported into Australia, despite being previously released in the country in 1989.

=== Trademark infringement lawsuit ===
In 1986, Topps was sued by the rights holders of Cabbage Patch Kids, Original Appalachian Artworks, for trademark infringement. As part of the out-of-court settlement, Topps agreed to modify the appearance of the Garbage Pail Kids to remove the resemblance between the characters and to change the logo design. Production of the cards themselves continued, but by 1988, sales had dwindled and a planned Series 16 was never produced.

=== BTS Bruisers ===
In March 2021, Topps released a sticker card depicting a Whac-A-Mole game with members of K-pop band BTS being severely beaten with a Grammy Award. After public backlash due to the card's perceived anti-Asian tone, the company apologized and withdrew the card.

== All-New Series sets ==
Card back of the Garbage Pail Kids Trading Card Game

In 2003, Topps reintroduced Garbage Pail Kids with all-new artwork, dubbed the All-New Series (ANS). ANS1 was entirely made up of artwork that was originally intended for release in the 1980s as Series 16, but 2004's ANS2 featured brand-new and original concepts. Unique numbers on the backs of silver foil and gold foil insert cards could be redeemed online at the official Garbage Pail Kids website, where visitors could build and "gross out" their own Garbage Pail Kids; as the number of unique code numbers applied to the character increased, the grosser it became. Less than six months later, ANS3 was released.

In 2005, Topps celebrated the 20th anniversary of the Garbage Pail Kids franchise with special Sketch Card original art inserts for its ANS4 set. These were limited to one randomly inserted card per hobby-exclusive box (available only from speciality retailers) and featured original artwork by series regulars John Pound, Tom Bunk and Jay Lynch, as well as guest artists Strephon Taylor, John Czop, Don Perlin and Justin Green. Although a regular to the series with over 35 paintings, Luis Diaz was not involved in the sketch cards due to a previous financial dispute with Topps from years earlier.

In 2006, ANS5 was released with 40 more new kids (each with an a/b twin), followed by ANS6 in early 2007. January 2008 saw the release of ANS7 which expanded the base set to 55 new characters and was the last set to feature new artwork until 2010's Flashback Series 1 subset of six previously unpublished "lost" kids.

The ANS cards differ from the original series (OS) in a number of ways, the most obvious being the upgraded quality of the card stock with a glossy protective surface. The ANS releases also changed the card numbering format: OS cards used a continuous numbering pattern so that each new set would pick up where the last one ended (e.g., OS1 ended at #41a/b and OS2 picked up at #42a/b, while ANS reset the numbering back to #1a/b with each subsequent release). Each ANS also featured special chase cards randomly inserted in packs; for example, foil cards show characters from the original series (with modified artwork due to the lawsuit), Scratch 'n Stink cards, collectible card game cards, temporary tattoos, 3D pop-up cards, alphabet cards, activity cards, magnets, lenticular Loco Motion cards and die-cut jigsaw puzzle cards, along with special bonus cards available only at participating retailers in either "bonus boxes" or rack packs, these bonus stickers were the first cards not to have a twin set.

== Flashback re-releases ==
Topps released a 25th-anniversary Flashback set on February 24, 2010, featuring reprints of characters from the original 1985–87 GPK series (eight each from OS1 to OS8) plus six previously unpublished "lost" characters and 10 Where Are They Now? cards, the latter showing classic Garbage Pail Kids drawn as they would have appeared if they had been released at that time. Packs contained randomly inserted chase cards, including lenticular Loco Motion cards, authentic printing plates, four levels of parallels and hand-drawn artist sketches by pop-culture artists, including Layron DeJarnette, Brent Engstrom, David Gross, Mark Pingitore, Joe Simko, Colin Walton, Neil Camera, Fred Wheaton, Jeff Zapata and veteran GPK artists Tom Bunk and Jay Lynch.

A second Flashback set was released on February 23, 2011, with 65 more OS reprints from Series 1 to 9 plus five more "lost" kids, 10 new Where Are They Now? cards, five 3D cards (resembling holograms but in full color), unique artist sketches and 10 Adam Mania cards showing variants of Adam Bomb's iconic mushroom cloud, plus parallels of both the base cards and the Adam Mania cards.

GPK Flashback Series 3 followed on November 2, 2011, with 65 OS reprints, four more "lost" kids, 10 new WATN? cards, five more 3D cards, 10 more Adam Mania cards, plus artist sketches and parallels.

== Book ==
The book containing the first five series

Topps and Abrams Books released a hardcover book that showcased the first five series. The cover depicted a wrapper from the very first series released back in 1985. Each card was displayed with the "a" name and the "b" name on the bottom corner of the page. It also included four new chase cards that were wrapped in cellophane and adhered to the inside back cover of the book, but were easily removable without running the risk of damaging the book.

== Brand-New Series sets ==
In 2012, Topps announced it would reboot the Garbage Pail Kids franchise with new character and content themes more reminiscent of the original 1980s series in a set called Brand-New Series 1 (BNS1). The set was released on October 24, 2012. BNS1 features 55 new GPK characters, a reality TV subset, motion cards, mix 'n' match stickers, parallels, artist sketch cards and code cards redeemable for a chance to be painted as a Garbage Pail Kid in the next BNS. BNS2 was released in March and features 55 new characters, 18 re-imagined characters, lenticular cards, glow-in-the-dark cards and folded cards. Unlike the All-New Series set and like the old series sets, the numbering of BNS continues where the previous series ended. They have now announced that there will be a BNS3 released in the middle of October, after the release of the Chrome edition in August.

== Chrome Series sets ==
In October 2013, Topps re-released the original Series 1 as a metallic chromium card set containing all 41 kids, plus 14 previously unpublished "lost" kids.

On July 30, 2014, Topps re-released 1985's original Series 2 set, plus 13 returning characters from Series 2 characters that have been reimagined in previous Garbage Pail Kids sets also as a set of metallic chromium cards. Chrome Series cards are thicker than the original cards and are not stickers.

== 2014 Series 1 ==
Topps released a series of all-new cards with brand-new artwork for 2014. Like the older cards, these have activities on the back of the cards, including checklists, puzzles and Facebook profiles.

== 30th Anniversary Series ==
In July 2015, Topps released the 30th Anniversary Series with 110 a/b cards (220 cards total). The numbering differed from previous series in that, instead of ranging from #1–110a/b, it had several themed subsets, each of which started at #1 a/b with the subsets being checklist cards featuring variations of Adam Bomb (#1–2a/b), including Adam Bomb: Don't Push My Button, featuring classic GPK characters pressing Adam Bomb's button (#1–10a/b), Artistic Impression, featuring historical art as GPK characters (#1–10a/b), Artistic Interpretation, featuring characters drawn by guest artists (#1–5a/b), Comic Book Covers, featuring art from the comic books (#1–7a/b), Cutting Room Floor, featuring rejected concepts (#1–5a/b), Garbage Pail Kids' Kids, featuring the children of classic Garbage Pail Kids (#1–10a/b), Garbage Pail Pets, featuring animals as Garbage Pail Kids (#1–10a/b), Garbage Pail Presidents, featuring 10 former U.S. Presidents as Garbage Pail Kids (#1–10a/b), Lost Original Art, featuring the original paintings of classic Garbage Pail Kids which were never before published (#1–6a/b), Zoom Out, featuring zoomed-out Garbage Pail Kids showing what happened in the background (#1–10a/b) and '80s Spoofs, featuring parodies of things that were popular in the 1980s (#1–25a/b).

== Yearly themed series ==
After the 30th Anniversary Series, Topps began using a new formula that structured each series with an overall theme divided into subsets focusing on particular topics. In January 2016, American as Apple Pie In Your Face! put Garbage Pail Kids in situations that parodied American culture. A second 2016 series followed in April called Prime Slime Trashy TV with humorous takes on popular television shows. The first series for 2017 was January's Adam-geddon, which put the Garbage Pail Kids (including some classic kids) in perilous end-times scenarios. Topps announced that the second series for 2017 will arrive in October and be called Battle of the Bands, caricaturing popular music acts and record album covers. The yearly themed series, along with their timing around the 2016 presidential elections, provided Topps with a perfect opportunity to parody American politics. In July 2015, they released the 30th Anniversary Series, which featured 10 additional Garbage Pail Presidents. This was followed in January 2016 by The 2016 Presidential Candidates, and in September 2016, they launched DisgRace to the White House. The series culminated with Best of the 2016 U.S. Presidential Election and the 2017 Presidential Inaug-Hurl Ceremony in January 2017.

== Movies ==
=== The Garbage Pail Kids Movie ===
On August 21, 1987, a live action film based on the cards was released. Its campy production made it both a critical and commercial flop, opening poorly in 374 theaters with initial receipts of $661,512 and total gross receipts of $1,576,615, making a 60% profit on its $1 million budget. On Rotten Tomatoes, the film holds a 0% critic rating. The film is considered one of the worst films ever made. Topps featured advertisements for the film on the original Series 9 and 10 box-topper posters and variant wrappers.

=== Cancelled remake ===
On March 12, 2012, it was announced that Michael Eisner's Tornante Company would be producing a new film based on the cards, likely with computer-generated character imagery. Michael Vukadinovich was hired to write the screenplay for the film and PES has been hired to direct.

== Television ==
In May 2021, it was announced that a new animated TV series based on the cards is in the works at HBO Max, and would be co-produced by Topps, Tornante Company and Danny McBride's production company Rough House Pictures. In October 2023, director David Gordon Green confirmed the TV series is still in development.

== See also ==
- Wacky Packages
- Hollywood Zombies
- Madballs
- The Trash Pack
