= The Aviators (film) =

- Theatrical release poster
- Directed by: Miquel Pujol
- Written by: Miquel Pujol (script); Ibán Roca (script)
- Produced by: Hilari Pujol; Beñat Beitia
- Cinematography: Donato Fierro
- Edited by: Xavier Cabrera
- Music by: Manel Gil
- Production companies: Accio Studios; RTVE
- Distributed by: Concept Producciones
- Release dates: 26 September 2008 (San Sebastián International Film Festival); 19 June 2009 (Spain)
- Running time: 85 minutes
- Country: Spain
- Language: Spanish
- Box office: $181,233

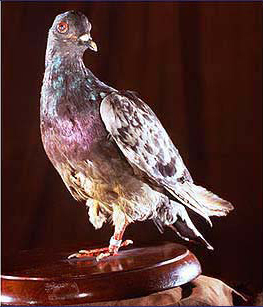
Stuffed body of the real Cher Ami, who inspired the film

The Aviators (Spanish: Cher Ami... ¡y yo!; released as Flying Heroes in some countries) is a 2008 Spanish-language Catalonian animated adventure film directed by Miquel Pujol from a script by him and Ibán Roca. Produced by Accio Studios, the plot concerns the true story of Cher Ami, a bird that lives on a French farm, who enlists in World War I to become a war pigeon so he can be regarded as a hero. The soundtrack, composed by Manel Gil and performed by the Bratislava Symphony Orchestra, features the vocals of Spanish singer Nina. The Aviators had its world premiere at the San Sebastián International Film Festival on 26 September 2008, before being theatrically released in Spain on 19 June 2009. It won Best Animated Film at the 2nd Gaudí Awards.

== Premise ==
Cher Ami, a bird living on a French farm in 1918, enlists in World War I alongside a dove and a mouse in order to become a war pigeon in the hope of being regarded as a hero by his peers.

== Cast ==
Character	Original Actor	Dub Actor
Character	Original Actor	International	US
Cher Ami	TBA	Yann Bean	Brad Garrett
Lindbergh	Luis Posada	Zak Morgan	Jeff Foxworthy
Tourbillon	Pedro Torrabadella	Lloyd F. Booth Shankley
Venise	Jordi Vila	TBA
Sir Archibald	Felix Benito	Michael Laurie
Dominque	Victoria Pages	Tessa Munro
Red Falcon	Alfons Valles	Gerold Wunstel
McBomb	Arseni Corsellas	Jonathan Luke Thomas
Sargeant Grey	Juan Carlos Gustems	Robert Berliner
Coco	Andres Arahuete	TBA
Lyon	Joan Massotkleiner	Bill Rude
Chevalier	Jordi Boixaderas	TBA
Black Claw 1	Pep Ribas	TBA
Black Claw 2	Jose Javier Serrano	TBA
April	Núria Trifol	Sasha Zaripov
Amelie	TBA	Nicole Thompkins

=== Additional Voices ===
- Paul Austin - Soldiers
- Cyrille Autin - Victor
- Bryan Forrest - Charlie, Kid Sparrows
- Hugh Lehane
- P.J. Marino - Soldiers
- Napoleon Ryan
- Tyler Shamy
- Mike Vaughn - Soldiers
- Sheila Vosough - Mom, Josephine, Bridget
- Chris Wyatt - Roman

== Production ==
The film combines traditional 2D animation with 3D computer-animation. Director Miquel Pujol compared the style to older Disney films.

== Release ==
The Aviators had its world premiere at the San Sebastián International Film Festival on 26 September 2008, before being theatrically released in Spain on 19 June 2009, for a gross of $181,233.

== See also ==
- Valiant – a film with a similar premise
