= Redneck 12 Days of Christmas =

Single by Jeff Foxworthy

from the album Crank It Up: The Music Album
- B-side: "'Twas the Night After Christmas"
- Released: December 1995
- Genre: Comedy, country
- Length: 2:21
- Label: Warner Bros. Records
- Songwriters: Jeff Foxworthy; Tim Wilson
- Producers: Doug Grau; Scott Rouse

Jeff Foxworthy singles chronology
"Party All Night" (1995)	"Redneck 12 Days of Christmas" (1995)	"Redneck Games" (1996)

"Redneck 12 Days of Christmas" is a redneck parody of "The Twelve Days of Christmas" written by Jeff Foxworthy and Tim Wilson and recorded by Foxworthy on his 1996 album Crank It Up: The Music Album. The song reached number 18 on the Billboard Hot Country Singles & Tracks chart in January 1996, becoming the highest-charting seasonal title of the SoundScan era, a record that has since been tied by Jimmy Wayne's "Paper Angels." It subsequently peaked at number 39 in January 1997, number 39 in January 1998, number 37 in January 1999 and number 35 in January 2000.

The song's B-side, "'Twas the Night After Christmas", peaked at number 67 on the Billboard Hot Country Singles & Tracks chart in January 1997.

== Plot ==
The song features Foxworthy talking to an unnamed sidekick (also voiced by Foxworthy using pitch shifting, and portrayed by Foxworthy as a miniature elf in the music video) about his Walmart haul, replacing the traditional list of gifts with stereotypical redneck gifts: Budweiser, rasslin' tickets, Copenhagen (a tin of it instead of ten cans, playing on Appalachian English vowel shift), nine years' probation (for the sidekick's mama in prison), table dancers, Red Man, Spam, flannel shirts, mud tires, shotgun shells, hunting dogs, and car parts. Only the fifth and twelfth verses (the latter three times) are sung in full, and the bridge consists of Christmas jokes from Foxworthy's "You Might Be a Redneck" stand-up comedy routine.

An attempt to calculate the redneck Christmas Price Index was undertaken in 2019; its calculation was hampered by the fact that the cost of the nine years' probation (calculated by taking nine years' salary of a probation officer and subtracting the cost to the state to incarcerate a person in prison for the same amount of time) vastly overwhelmed the cost of the rest of the items.

== Music video, ==
The music video was directed by Michael McNamara and premiered in November 1996.

== Chart performance ==
Chart (1995–1996)	Peak position
U.S. Billboard Hot Country Singles & Tracks	18
Chart (1996–1997)	Peak position
U.S. Billboard Hot Country Singles & Tracks	39
Chart (1997–1998)	Peak position
U.S. Billboard Hot Country Singles & Tracks	39
Chart (1999)	Peak position
U.S. Billboard Hot Country Singles & Tracks	37
Chart (1999–2000)	Peak position
U.S. Billboard Hot Country Singles & Tracks	35
