= Games Rednecks Play =

Album by Jeff Foxworthy

Live album by Jeff Foxworthy
- Released: July 18, 1995
- Genre: Comedy
- Length: 50:25
- Label: Warner Bros.
- Producer: Jeff Foxworthy; Doug Grau; Scott Rouse

Jeff Foxworthy chronology
You Might Be a Redneck If… (1993)	Games Rednecks Play (1995)	Crank It Up: The Music Album (1996)

Professional ratings
Review scores
Source	Rating
Allmusic	4.5/5 stars

Games Rednecks Play is an album by American comedian Jeff Foxworthy. It was released by Warner Bros. Records on July 18, 1995. The album peaked at number 8 on the Billboard 200 chart and has been certified 3× Platinum by the RIAA. It was nominated for the Grammy for Best Spoken Comedy Album and as of 2011 still stands as Jeff Foxworthy's best-selling album, with 2,084,000 copies sold in the US.

== Track listing ==
All tracks written by Jeff Foxworthy; "Party All Night" co-written by Scott Rouse

1. "Introduction" – 1:46
2. "Victoria's Secret" – 4:03
3. "Games Rednecks Play" – 3:55
4. "Southern Accent" – 2:24
5. "NASA & Alabama & Fishing Shows" – 3:20
6. "Clampetts Go to Maui" – 6:51
7. "I Love Being a Parent" – 8:46
8. "Out of the Gene Pool" – 3:30
9. "Seek and Destroy" – 4:00
10. "Don't Drink and Drive" – 5:17
11. "More You Might Be a Redneck If…" – 3:28
12. "Party All Night" – 3:06
  - musical track with Little Texas and Scott Rouse

== Charts ==
=== Weekly charts ===
Chart (1995)	Peak position
Canadian Country Albums (RPM)	6
US Billboard 200	8
US Top Country Albums (Billboard)	2

=== Year-end charts ===
Chart (1995)	Position
US Billboard 200	71
US Top Country Albums (Billboard)	9
Chart (1996)	Position
US Billboard 200	85
US Top Country Albums (Billboard)	12
