= Wacky Packages =

Trading cards featuring parodies of consumer products

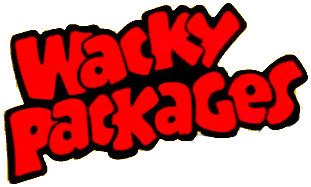
- Logo
- Type: Trading cards, stickers
- Company: Topps
- Country: United States
- Availability: 1967–1992, 2004–present

Wacky Packages are a series of humorous trading cards featuring parodies of consumer products. The cards were produced by Topps beginning in 1967, first in die-cut, then in peel-and-stick sticker format. There were 16 series produced between 1973 and 1977, with some reprints and several new series released up to the present day.

At the height of their popularity from 1973 to 1975, Wacky Packages were the best-selling Topps product, even more popular than Topps baseball cards, when they were by far the most sold trading card items in the United States.

Featuring work by artists such as Kim Deitch, George Evans, Drew Friedman, Bill Griffith, Jay Lynch, Norman Saunders, Art Spiegelman, Bhob Stewart and Tom Sutton, the cards spoof brands and packaging.

== History ==
=== First releases (1960s) ===
The very first Wacky Packages series was produced in 1967 and featured 44 die-cut cards that were made to be punched out, licked on the back and stuck to surfaces. This series featured parodies created by Art Spiegelman and primarily painted by Norm Saunders. Two of the cards – "Cracked Animals" and "Ratz Crackers" – were pulled from production after the initial run. "Moron Salt" was pulled later and replaced by "Jolly Mean Giant", which was also pulled soon after that. In all, 14 of the 44 cards were pulled from the series, all of them due to cease-and-desist letters sent to Topps by the companies that, at the time, owned the products being parodied. This series was followed by a somewhat different series called Wacky Ads in 1969, featuring parodies and roughs by Jay Lynch and Kim Deitch, with finished paintings by Tom Sutton. 30 of the 36 3-by-5-inch (76 mm × 127 mm) cards were designed to look like miniature billboards with a die-cut around the parodied product, so it could be punched out of the horizontal billboard scene, then also be licked on the back and stuck to surfaces. There were two different printings of the Ads, the first with long perforations on the stickers' die-cuts and the second with short perforations. Card no. 25, "Good and Empty", was pulled from the first printing and never replaced after Leaf Brands, which then owned the parodied product Good & Plenty, sued Topps. At least two extra Ads, "Mixwell Hearse Coffee" and "Muleburro Cigarettes", are now known to have been finished, but were never released as actual cards.

=== 1970s ===
"Gulp Oil", a parody of Gulf Oil, a sticker from the 11th series,1974

Wacky Packages returned in 1973 as peel-and-stick stickers. From 1973 to 1977, 16 different series were produced and sold, originally (with Series 1–15) in 5-cent packs containing three (later reduced to two) stickers, a stick of bubble gum and a puzzle piece with a sticker checklist on the back of it. For Series 16, the price rose to 10 cents per pack containing three stickers, a stick of bubble gum, and a puzzle piece/sticker checklist. Series 7 was also available in some areas in packs without bubble gum for a short period of time. There were, on average, between 27 and 33 cards in each series and nine puzzle/checklist cards in each series, each puzzle parodying a Topps product that was always one of the stickers in each series (thus avoiding potential complaints that would often lead to the aforementioned cease-and-desist letters; see First releases (1960s) above). Series 1 re-used 30 designs from the 1967 die-cut series and Series 2 re-used 25 designs from the 1969 Wacky Ads, plus eight new parodies. From Series 3 to Series 16, each new release had original parodies. All in all, there were 488 different cards over 16 series (one card from Series 2 was re-released in Series 14 for unknown reasons). These cards can be distinguished from all later releases by a lack of a number on the front of the cards and having mostly tan or white backs.

=== 1985, 1991 and cancelled 1992 series ===
Two newly designed series were produced later in both 1985 and 1991. A 1992 series was planned, started and even nearly completed, but was halted in mid-production and never released, according to Fred Wheaton, one of the many recent artists for the modern Wacky Packages run.

=== 2004 and beyond ===
Wacky Packages returned in 2004 with the release of the first All-New Series (ANS) set of stickers. New series have appeared almost annually, on average, between then and 2018. ANS1 and ANS2 consisted of 55 base cards with one level of chase cards, then, from ANS3 to ANS5, two levels of chase cards. ANS6 was released as a Jumbo Series and consists of 80 base cards and four levels of chase cards. ANS7 saw the return of the 55-card base set, but with more levels of chase cards, as well as border color variations and sketch cards. Card backs in this run had a mixture of puzzle pieces, checklists and parodies of coupons, websites and billboards depending on the series and, from ANS7 onward, had both multiple levels of chase cards and multiple border color variations. The ANS sets also saw the return of original 1970s Wacky Packages cartoonist Jay Lynch, plus newcomers David Gross, Strephon Taylor, Neil Camera, Fred Wheaton, Smokin' Joe McWilliams, Mark Parisi, Brent Engstrom, Mark Pingitore, Sam Gambino and Joe Simko. ANS3 and ANS4 both included the work of underground artist M. Wartella.

In 2017, a new series was released to celebrate the 50th anniversary of Wacky Packages. This new series included 90 new base cards, including modern-day remakes of classic 1967 cards, plus exclusive "Best of the 80's", "Best of the 90's" and "Best of the 00's" subsets. It also included the usual border color variations. In 2018, Topps released a new series spoofing various film genres. This set included 300 cards in separate subsets.

== Reprints ==
Many of the original 1973–1977 cards have been reissued over the years in various series.

=== 1979 and 1980 rerun series ===
1979 first rerun series wrapper

Four rerun series with 66 cards each were produced – the first two in 1979 and the last two in 1980 – for a total of 264 cards. These series consisted of images from the 1973–1977 cards, as well as one previously unpublished image – Series 4 card no. 235 "Frosted Ice Krunkles" – which was exclusive to the rerun series (and was one of three previously unpublished stickers originally intended for Series 12 (the other two, along with this one, were published in Wacky Pack Flashback; see 2008 Flashback series below)). Each card can be distinguished easily by its number (e.g., "No. 1 of 66") printed on the front. These four series were the first since the 1967 die-cut series and the 1969 Wacky Ads series to number their cards, in this case on the front instead of the back as the die-cuts did; Ads was the first series to be numbered on the front. Front-of-the-card numbering has continued from this point on all the way up to the most recent series.

=== 1982 and 1986 album series ===
Two series of album stickers were produced for 1982 and 1986 and consisted of 120 and 77 stickers, respectively. These stickers also consisted of images from the 1973–1977 cards, as well as one previously unpublished image – card no. 85 ("Schnozmopolitan") in the 1982 album series (which was intended for Series 11) and four new images that were exclusive to the same series and based on Ralston Purina breakfast cereals of the time. The stickers were of a reduced size in comparison to the standard cards (2.125 by 3 inches (54.0 mm × 76.2 mm)) and were designed to be affixed to a display album that was sold separately. Only the 1982 album series and its matching album were actually released to stores; the 1986 album series was cancelled for unknown reasons and no album is known to exist for it.

=== 2008 Flashback series ===
On March 30, 2008, Topps released a series called Wacky Pack Flashback. This series contained parodies from previously released series, including nine of the 14 pulled parodies from the die-cuts released as peel-and-stick stickers for the first time (see First releases (1960s) above), 20 from the 1973 posters also released as peel-and-stick stickers for the first time (see Wacky Package Posters below), one from one of the rerun series (the fourth and final series from 1980; see 1979 and 1980 rerun series above) and two from the 1982 album series (see 1982 and 1986 album series above), as well as eight unreleased parodies from the original 1970s run (titled Lost Wackys), to make a series of 72 base cards. This set also featured a number of chase cards and border color variations outside of the main set (this was the first Wacky Packages series to feature such variations, though definitely not the last). Its card backs republished many of the Wacky Ads (again, see First releases (1960s) above). On December 10, 2008, Topps released a second series called Wacky Pack Flashback 2. This set also contained more parodies from previously released series, including two more from the 1973 posters again released as peel-and-stick stickers for the first time, six based on a 1980 test-marketed (and given a very limited release to stores) Wacky Cans series (a series of 12 small plastic cans of fruit-flavored candy shapes with a paper label adhered to each of them) also released as peel-and-stick stickers for the first time, another one from the 1982 album series, one from a 1985 "Irish" series (this series was actually released exclusively in the United Kingdom and never released in the United States) and nine unreleased parodies from the cancelled 1992 series (also titled Lost Wackys), to make another series of 72 base cards. Wacky Pack Flashback 2 also featured a number of chase cards and border color variations outside of the main set. Its card backs republished a few of the Wacky Ads and a few previously unpublished coupon parodies (other coupon parodies of a similar nature were previously included on card backs for ANS1; both of these sets of parodies were probably originally intended as card backs for the cancelled 1992 series).

=== 2014 Chrome series ===
On July 23, 2014, Topps released a series called Wacky Packages Chrome. This series contained a metallic chromium non-sticker card set of 110 base cards consisting of the 1967 die-cuts, the 1973 Series 2 and 3 and the checklists for all three series (with each checklist having its respective series' Topps product parody on the front of the card (minus a black border)), as well as four metallic chromium non-sticker card subsets consisting of the 36 1969 Wacky Ads, 10 Lost Wackys, 20 Cutting Room Floor parodies, and five Where Are They Now? parodies (the last one taken from five of the base cards, with all five of them re-done with contemporary (as of 2014) packaging artwork), for a total of 181 cards. Like the two Flashback series, this one featured a number of chase cards outside of the main set, but it had no border variations.

== Promotional items ==
Wacky Packages promotional stickers have been placed in numerous products since the 1970s as incentives to purchase the product or to promote a new series release. Some of these promotional stickers were used as inserts in bags of Wonder Bread (easily identifiable today by their greasy surfaces) during 1974–1975, running for three series of stickers. Other promotional stickers have also appeared at different times in Hostess pastries, Shedd's Peanut Butter plastic containers, Ralston Purina breakfast cereals and, more recently, in a number of DC Comics publications (to promote the then-new ANS1) and in the Abrams Books line of products.

== Canadian releases (O-Pee-Chee) ==
O-Pee-Chee (OPC), a London, Ontario candy and trading card company, licensed Wacky Packages from Topps for the Canadian market across multiple eras from 1973 to 1992.

The initial OPC releases coincided with the original Topps run. Between 1973 and 1974, OPC produced four series of Canadian Wacky Packages stickers, corresponding to Topps' Wacky Packages 1st Series through its 4th Series. The OPC versions were printed on different cardstock, included bilingual English and French text, and carried a reduced title selection compared to their U.S. counterparts — the four OPC sets contained 25, 25, 24 and 19 titles, respectively. The copyright line "O.P.C. PTD. IN CANADA" appeared on the front of the stickers in these sets. Back variants (tan and white) existed for both the 1st Series and the 3rd Series; in the OPC 1st Series white backs were the scarcer variation, while in the OPC 3rd Series tan backs were the rare variation.

OPC did not produce Canadian equivalents of Topps' Wacky Packages 5th Series through its 16th Series. Canadian releases resumed in 1979–1980 with an OPC-packaged version of Topps' four equivalent rerun series, comprising 264 cards across four series. The stickers in this release were physically identical to the Topps versions and carried the Topps copyright; only the bilingual packaging identified them as OPC products.

In 1982, OPC released a 120-sticker album sticker series in a smaller format that was printed in Italy with bilingual packaging and an accompanying collector album which was sold separately.

OPC released a 44-card series in 1985 that was physically identical to Topps' equivalent 1985 Series; the stickers carried only the Topps copyright, and its OPC origin could only be confirmed by the bilingual wax pack wrapper.

Three Canada-only rerun compilations followed with no equivalent Topps releases: 66-card sets in 1987, 1988 and 1989, each reprinting artwork from the original 1970s Topps series in OPC packaging. These sets carried an OPC copyright on the sticker fronts.

The final OPC Wacky Packages release was a 66-card series in 1992, which included four back variants per sticker (checklist, puzzle piece, completed puzzle and coupon). The 1992 set carried the "©1992 O-PEE-CHEE CO. LTD." copyright on the sticker front and was the only OPC Wacky Packages release to carry a UPC barcode on its wax pack wrapper.

== Spin-off items ==
Topps has created a variety of additional Wacky Packages spin-off products over the years.

=== Wacky Package Posters ===
In 1973, a series of 24 oversized paper posters was produced. 22 of the 24 parodies re-used artwork from the original 1970s run (the other two were brand new parodies). These posters were created from new artwork painted at a significantly larger size than was done for the stickers. In addition to being sold in stores, the posters were also advertised on various Wacky Packages series wrappers and could be obtained by sending $2.00 to Topps. A second series of 24 posters was produced in 1974 with a differently colored wrapper, but it was nearly identical to the first series, except that three of the original posters (all three of them General Mills breakfast cereal parodies, with one of the three being one of the two brand new ones) were replaced with three new ones that were especially made for that series (again re-using artwork from the original 1970s run for all three of them). Packs in the 1973 series contained one poster and a piece of bubble gum, while packs in the 1974 series also contained one poster, but no piece of bubble gum.

On August 30, 2012, a modern-day series of 24 oversized paper posters was produced as a new set called Wacky Packages Posters Series One, with 21 of them depicting enlargements of re-used artwork from the All New Series run, as well as including three new parodies that were especially made for this series. As this series maintained the aspect ratio of the original art, the posters were significantly wider than the 1973 and 1974 posters. This new series was sold exclusively through the Topps Online Store. This run of posters has not been continued since 2012.

=== Wacky Packages Postcards, Wacky Halloween Postcards and Wacky Packages Postcards April Fools ===
On November 21, 2007, Topps released the first of its various Wacky Packages Postcards series. Originally created by artist Neil Camera, the first three-card series was released in two editions: a limited edition of 100 autographed and numbered sets and a regular unautographed edition. Since then, the Postcards series have been expanded to include additional titles and artists. As of 2024 nine regular series (which were all released between 2007 and 2013), seven special Halloween series called Wacky Halloween Postcards (which parodied mostly candy products in connection with the holiday, with the first five series released on a one-series-a-year basis between 2009 and 2013, the sixth series released seven years later in 2020 and the seventh series released three years after that in 2023) and two special April Fools' Day series called Wacky Packages Postcards April Fools 2020 and Wacky Packages Postcards April Fools Edition! 2023, as well as several promotional cards that were released at various trading card shows, have appeared. Each series (except for Wacky Halloween Postcards 2009, which was originally released as a subset of Wacky Packages Postcards Series 4, presumably to test the concept) had two editions: a limited edition of autographed and numbered sets and a regular edition of unautographed sets. Two Limited Edition Official Collector Binder three-ring binders (the first one with a mostly red cover and the second one with a mostly yellow cover) were made for the Postcards series and one Limited Edition Official Collector Binder three-ring binder (with a mostly orange cover containing a black spider web background pattern) was made for the Halloween Postcards series. These series also included various sketch cards by Wacky Packages artists such as Neil Camera, Smokin' Joe McWilliams, Sam Gambino and Brent Engstrom. Wacky Packages Postcards, Wacky Halloween Postcards, Wacky Packages Postcards April Fools 2020 and Wacky Packages Postcards April Fools Edition! 2023 were all sold exclusively through the Topps Online Store.

=== Wacky Packages Old School ===
On February 23, 2010, Topps released Series 1 of an ongoing series called Wacky Packages Old School that was (and still is) sold exclusively through the Topps Online Store. This line, created by David Gross, was initially designed to resemble the boxes, wrappers, stickers and puzzle pieces/checklists of the original 1973–1977 run. Some, but not all, of the series included 33 stickers, along with a nine-piece puzzle with checklists on the backs, with the parodies mostly based on products from the 1970s that Topps did not parody in the original 1970s run (Series 8 from 2019, Series 9 from 2020 and Series 10 from 2022, however, had parodies based on products from the 1980s that Topps did not parody in the 1985 series). Also included in some of the series were various chase cards and a sketch card in every box. The Old School Series 1 sketch cards were all done by Jay Lynch. As of 2024, 11 Old School series (with 33 stickers in Series 1–5, 30 stickers in Series 6–10 and 28 stickers in Series 11) and one subset in Topps' Wacky Packages 50th Anniversary Series (2017) (with 10 stickers that were also parodies based on products from the 1970s that Topps did not parody in the original 1970s run) have been released, for a total of 353 stickers.

=== Wacky Packages Erasers ===
Topps released two series of Wacky Packages Erasers, the first one on March 23, 2011 and the second one on October 12, 2011, each with 24 Wacky Packages All-New Series parody designs; each pack included one eraser with a paper label of the design wrapped around it and a miniature sticker of that eraser. Four of the erasers in each of the two series were rare ones. No further series have been released since 2011.

=== Wacky Packages Comics ===
As of 2024, Topps has released six issues of Wacky Packages Comics. Issue No. 5 was released on April 1, 2013 – Topps' self-proclaimed Wacky Packages Day – with an April Fools' Day theme illustrated by Brent Engstrom.

=== Wacky Packages Minis ===
In March 2020, Super Impulse USA licensed the Wacky Packages brand through Topps and created Wacky Packages Minis, miniature 3D plastic models of various parody products. The models were about 1 inch (2.5 cm) in length, and were sold in various quantities. They contained information on each side. Each package contained the models, a sticker, and a checklist showing all of the collectable items that the company offered. There were a total of 82 different models available, with some more rare than others.

== Garbage Pail Kids connection ==
One unreleased sticker, painted by John Pound for the 1985 series, spawned the various Garbage Pail Kids trading card series.

== Merchandise ==
There have been numerous other types of Wacky Packages-related merchandise made through the years such as T-shirts, art books, wall calendars, wall graphics, canvas art, three-ring binders and collector albums.

== Bibliography ==
- Fleer Corp. v. Topps Chewing Gum, Inc. and Major League Baseball Players' Association, 501 F. Supp. 485 (E.D. Pennsylvania, 30 June 1980).
- "Digging in the Vault for the Secrets of Wacky Packages: Topps Goes Back to Class in Wacky Packages Old School Series 2", Non-Sport Update Vol. 21, No. 6, December 2010 – January 2011. (Roxanne Toser Non-Sport Enterprises, Inc.)
