= Have Your Loved Ones Spayed or Neutered =

Live album by Jeff Foxworthy
- Released: July 6, 2004
- Recorded: Minneapolis Orpheum Theatre March 27, 2004 and The Louisville Palace March 6, 2004
- Genre: Comedy
- Label: Warner Bros.
- Producer: Jeff Foxworthy; J. P. Williams

Jeff Foxworthy chronology
Best of Jeff Foxworthy: Double Wide, Single Minded (2004)	Have Your Loved Ones Spayed or Neutered (2004)

Professional ratings
Review scores
Source	Rating
Allmusic	4/5 stars

Have Your Loved Ones Spayed or Neutered is an album by American comedian Jeff Foxworthy. It was released by Warner Bros. Records on July 6, 2004. The album peaked at number 47 on the Billboard 200 chart.

== Track listing ==
All tracks written by Jay Foxworthy, Jeff Foxworthy, Mike Shydner and Mike Venneman; additional writing on "I Believe (Encore)" by Larry the Cable Guy.

1. "Have Your Loved Ones Spayed or Neutered" – 8:37
2. "Airport Security and Rental Cars" – 3:14
3. "TV and Its Side Effects" – 9:49
4. "Oreo Generation" – 3:42
5. "I'm Next in Line" – 8:26
6. "Grocery Stores" – 2:36
7. "Courtesy Sniffs" – 4:14
8. "I Believe (Encore)" – 13:35
  - includes a parody of "Can't You See" by the Marshall Tucker Band, written by Toy Caldwell

== Charts ==
=== Weekly charts ===
Chart (2004)	Peak position
US Billboard 200	47
US Top Comedy Albums (Billboard)	5
US Top Country Albums (Billboard)	7

=== Year-end charts ===
Chart (2004)	Position
US Top Country Albums (Billboard)	73
