= DeJarnette, Virginia =

Unincorporated community in Virginia, United States

Coordinates: 37°59′57″N 77°19′15″W

DeJarnette is an unincorporated community in Caroline County, in the U.S. state of Virginia.
