= Shedd's Peanut Butter =

Former American brand of peanut butter

Shedd's Peanut Butter container

Shedd's was an American brand of peanut butter, from the manufacturer of Shedd's Spread.

The brand is remembered for its availability in buckets, originally tin, and later, plastic, which could be reused as sand buckets for sandboxes and beach play. The product was discontinued in the 1980s, with the Shedd's brand now part of Unilever.
