= Best of Jeff Foxworthy: Double Wide, Single Minded =

Greatest hits album by Jeff Foxworthy
- Released: March 5, 2004
- Recorded: 1991–1992, 1994, 1999–2000, 2003
- Genre: Comedy
- Label: Rhino Entertainment

Jeff Foxworthy chronology
Big Funny (2000)	Best of Jeff Foxworthy: Double Wide, Single Minded (2004)	Have Your Loved Ones Spayed or Neutered (2004)

Best of Jeff Foxworthy: Double Wide, Single Minded is a compilation album by American comedian Jeff Foxworthy, featuring highlights from his previous works. It was released by Rhino Entertainment on March 5, 2004. The album peaked at number 76 on the Billboard 200 chart.

== Track listing ==
All tracks written by Jeff Foxworthy except where noted.

1. "You Might Be a Redneck If…" – 2:41
2. "Seek and Destroy" – 3:59
3. "Sophisticated People vs. Rednecks" (Foxworthy, Ritch Shydner) – 6:17
4. "You Can't Give Rednecks Money" (Foxworthy, Shydner) – 1:51
5. "Still More You Might Be a Redneck If…" – 2:57
6. "Southern Accent" – 2:28
7. "Big O' Moon" (Foxworthy, Dr. Jim Rouse, Scott Rouse) – 2:25
8. "Victoria's Secret" – 4:12
9. "S.I.N.G.L.E." – 4:02
10. "Life as a Father" – 9:43
11. "I Still Don't Know…" – 10:24
12. "The Rules of Marriage" (Foxworthy, Shydner) – 10:40
13. "Every Single Hair on Her Body" (Foxworthy, Shydner) – 5:56
14. "Made a Friend in the Bathroom" – 0:48
15. "You Might Be a Redneck If…, Pt. 6" – 6:02
16. "Pure Bred Redneck" (Glenn Ashworth, Buddy Causey, Foxworthy, Dana Sigmon) – 3:04
  - with Cooter Brown

== Charts ==
=== Weekly charts ===
Chart (2003)	Peak position
US Billboard 200	76
US Top Comedy Albums (Billboard)	1
US Top Country Albums (Billboard)	10

=== Year-end charts ===
Chart (2004)	Position
US Top Country Albums (Billboard)	70
