= Big Funny =

Live album by Jeff Foxworthy
- Released: April 25, 2000
- Recorded: November 20, 1999
- Venue: Indiana University
- Genre: Comedy
- Length: 43:03
- Label: DreamWorks
- Producer: Doug Grau; J. P. Williams

Jeff Foxworthy chronology
| Greatest Bits (1999) | Big Funny (2000) | Best of Jeff Foxworthy: Double Wide, Single Minded (2003) |

Professional ratings
Review scores
| Source | Rating |
|---|---|
| Allmusic | 3/5 stars |

Big Funny is an album by American comedian Jeff Foxworthy. It was released by DreamWorks Records on April 25, 2000. The album peaked at number 143 on the Billboard 200 chart.

== Track listing ==
All tracks written by Jeff Foxworthy and Ritch Shydner except where noted

1. "Introduction" – 0:46
2. "Seeing Things on the Road" – 3:39
3. "I'd Thought I'd Heard Every Redneck Thing" – 1:57
4. "Telephones in the Bathroom" – 1:11
5. "Jeff Gordon Enunciates" – 2:13
6. "Speaking of Words" – 1:12
7. "The Way I Grew Up" – 1:58
8. "My Wife's Family" – 5:52
9. "House Full of Girls" – 4:50
10. "It's a Different World" – 5:03
11. "I Don't Need to Know That" – 1:27
12. "You Are Being Trained" – 1:13
13. "Women Want to Talk" – 6:17
14. "Thanks Y'all (Encore)" – 2:18
15. "Blue Collar Dollar" (Bill Engvall, Foxworthy, Doug Grau, Porter Howell) – 3:07
  - with Bill Engvall and Marty Stuart

== Personnel ==
- Adapted from AllMusic:
- J. T. Corenflos - electric guitar
- Chad Cromwell - drums
- Diana DeWitt - backing vocals
- Porter Howell - acoustic guitar, electric guitar
- Tim Lauer - keyboards
- Gary Oleyar - fiddle
- Kim Parent - backing vocals
- Alison Prestwood - bass
- Marty Stuart - vocals, electric guitar
- Russell Terrell - backing vocals

== Chart performance ==
| Chart (2000) | Peak position |
|---|---|
| U.S. Billboard Top Country Albums | 15 |
| U.S. Billboard 200 | 143 |
| Canadian RPM Country Albums | 30 |
