= Layron DeJarnette =

American cartoonist

- Born: Detroit, Michigan
- Education: College for Creative Studies
- Occupations: Director, art director, illustrator, animator, character designer, character design supervisor, storyboard artist, caricaturist
- Years active: 1992-present
- Known for: Garbage Pail Kids, Monster High, The Ricky Gervais Show, Hollywood Zombies

Layron DeJarnette is an American illustrator, director, art director, character designer, storyboard artist, animator and caricaturist. He is best known as a character designer on Disney's The Proud Family: Louder and Prouder, art director on the Monster High web series for Mattel. and character design supervisor on The Ricky Gervais Show for HBO. He is a Garbage Pail Kids artist for Topps and trading card illustrator for the Upper Deck Company and Cryptozoic Entertainment.

== Early life ==
DeJarnette was born in Detroit Michigan. He received a Bachelor of Fine Arts in illustration from the College for Creative Studies.

== Career ==
DeJarnette began his career working as a graphic designer and illustrator at the WKBD-TV television station in Southfield, Michigan, after which he trained at Walt Disney Feature Animation Studios in Orlando, Florida. He later became an instructor at the College for Creative Studies, teaching Figure Drawing, Anatomy, Illustration and Animation Drawing.

In 2000, DeJarnette relocated to Los Angeles, California to provide work for various studios in the entertainment industry, including Disney, Warner Bros. Animation, Marvel, DC Comics, Mattel, Hasbro, WildBrain, 6 Point Harness, ABC, Fox Atomic, Lionsgate, LeapFrog, Sega, Duck Studios, Hyperion Pictures, and Klasky Csupo.

DeJarnette has also been is a Garbage Pail Kids artist for Topps, as well as a trading card illustrator for the Upper Deck Company and Cryptozoic Entertainment.

== Filmography ==
=== Television ===
- The Proud Family (2001) Season 2 "Ain't Nothing Like The Real Thingy Baby" (character designer)
- Loonatics Unleashed (2005-2007) (storyboard artist)
- The Ricky Gervais Show (2010- 2012) (character designer, animator, season three character design supervisor)
- Classical Baby (2001-2019) (character designer, storyboard artist)
- Monster High: New Ghoul at School (2010) (character designer, animator)
- Monster High: Fright On! (2011) (character designer, animator)
- Super Best Friends Forever (2012) (character designer, character clean up artist)
- Storage Wars - Season 5 "All's Well That Urns Well" (2013) (himself - Garbage Pail Kids artist, appraiser)
- Fresh Beat Band of Spies (Series pitch) (2013) (storyboard artist, animatic artist)
- Angry Little Asian Girl (2014) (animator)
- Avengers Assemble (2016-2019) (character artist, clean up artist)
- Central Park (2019) (character designer)
- Spider-Man (2017) Marvel Venom Files: Captain Marvel (2019 animated short) (Co-director, storyboard artist and character designer)
- Spider-Man (2017) Marvel Venom Files: Ghost-Spider (2019 animated short) (Co-director, storyboard artist and character designer)
- Spider-Man (2017) Marvel Venom Files: Miles Morales (2019 animated short) (Co-director, storyboard artist and character designer)
- Spider-Man (2017) Marvel's The Secret History Of Venom (2020 animated short) (Co-director, art director, storyboard artist, character designer and layout artist)
- The Proud Family: Louder and Prouder (2022 -) (character designer)
- Hailey's On It! (2022 -) (character designer)

=== Monster High webisodes ===
- Monster High webisode Volume 1 (2010 - 2011) (character designer, animator)
- Monster High webisode Volume 2 (2011) (character designer, animator)
- Monster High webisode Volume 3 (2012 - 2013) (character designer, animator)
- Monster High webisode Volume 4 (2013 - 2014) (character designer, animator)
- Monster High webisode Volume 5 (2014 - 2015) (art director, character designer, animator)
- Monster High webisode Volume 6 (2016) (art director, character designer, animator)
- Monster High promotional and special webisodes (2011) (character designer, animator)

=== Films ===
- The Punisher (2004) (opening title sequence animator)
- I'm Rick James Documentary (2009) (animator)
- 30 Years of Garbage: The Garbage Pail Kids Story (2016) (Himself)

=== Animated DVDs ===
- LeapFrog Enterprises: Sing-Along Read-Along (2008) (animator, storyboard artist)
- LeapFrog Enterprises: Sing and Learn With Us! (2011) (animator, storyboard artist)
- LeapFrog Enterprises: The Amazing Alphabet Amusement Park (2011) (storyboard artist)

=== Motion Comics ===
- Red Steel 2 Motion Comic (2010) (character designer, illustrator)
- Barbie Motion Comics: Be Super (9 episodes) (2015) (co-director, character designer, storyboard revisionist, illustrator)
- Barbie Motion Comics: Raise Your Voice (9 episodes) (2015) (co-director, character designer, storyboard revisionist, illustrator)
- Barbie Motion Comics: Puppy Adventures (4 episodes) (2015) (co-director, character designer, storyboard revisionist, illustrator)

== Illustration Works ==
=== The Topps Company ===
- Garbage Pail Kids: All New Series 5 Trading Cards (2006) (base card illustrator)
- Garbage Pail Kids: All New Series 6 Trading Cards (2007) (base card illustrator)
- Garbage Pail Kids: All New Series 7 Trading Cards (2007) (base card illustrator)
- Hollywood Zombies Trading Cards (2007) (base card illustrator)
- Garbage Pail Kids: Flashback Series 1 Trading Cards (2010) (base card illustrator, sketch card artist)
- Garbage Pail Kids: Flashback Series 2 Trading Cards (2010) (sketch card artist)
- Garbage Pail Kids: Flashback Series 3 Trading Cards (2011) (sketch card artist)
- Garbage Pail Kids: Brand New Series 1 Trading Cards (2012) (base card illustrator, sketch card artist)
- Mars Attacks: Heritage Trading Cards (2012) (sketch card artist)
- Garbage Pail Kids: Brand New Series 2 Trading Cards (2013) (base card illustrator, sketch card artist)
- Garbage Pail Kids: Brand New Series 3 Trading Cards (2013) (base card illustrator, sketch card artist)
- Garbage Pail Kids: Mini Cards (2013) (sketch card artist)
- 2014 Garbage Pail Kids: Series 1 Trading Cards (2014) (base card illustrator, sketch card artist)
- 2014 Garbage Pail Kids: Series 2 Trading Cards (2014) (base card illustrator, sketch card artist)
- 2015 Garbage Pail Kids: Series 1 Trading Cards (2015) (base card illustrator, sketch card artist)
- Garbage Pail Kids: 30th Anniversary Trading Cards (2015)
- Garbage Pail Kids: American As Apple Pie In Your Face Trading Cards (2016) (base card illustrator, sketch card artist)
- Mars Attacks: Occupation (2016) (sketch card artist)
- Dinosaurs Attack! (2016) (sketch card artist)

=== Upper Deck Entertainment ===
- Marvel The Avengers Trading Cards (2012)
- Marvel Beginnings 2 Trading Cards (2012)
- Marvel Premier Trading Cards (2012)
- Iron Man 3 Trading Cards (2013)
- Marvel NOW! Trading Cards (2013)
- Thor: The Dark World Trading Cards (2014)
- 2014 Upper Deck Goodwin Champions "Monster" Trading Cards (2014)
- 2015 Upper Deck Goodwin Champions "Monster" Trading Cards (2015)
- 2015 Upper Deck Goodwin Champions "Game Of Chance" Trading Cards (2015)
- Avengers: Age of Ultron Trading Cards (2015)
- Ant-Man Trading Cards (2015)
- 2016 Upper Deck Goodwin Champions "Supernaturals" Trading Cards (2016)

=== Cryptozoic Entertainment ===
- DC Comics New 52 Trading Cards (2012) (sketch card artist)
- Batman: The Legend Trading Cards (2013) (sketch card artist)
- Superman: The Legend Trading Cards (2013) (sketch card artist)
- DC Comics Battle Trading Cards (2014) (sketch card artist)
- Adventure Time Trading Cards (2014) (sketch card artist)

== Books ==
- It's My Life: The Guide To Friendship (2006) (Illustrator)
- Jeff Foxworthy's Redneck Dictionary (2006) (Illustrator)
- Jeff Foxworthy's Redneck Dictionary II (2006) (Illustrator)
- Jeff Foxworthy's Redneck Dictionary III (2007) (Illustrator)
- Jeff Foxworthy's Complete Redneck Dictionary (2008) (Illustrator)
- Jeff Foxworthy's How To Really Stink At Golf (2008) (Illustrator)
- Jeff Foxworthy's How To Really Stink At Work (2008) (Illustrator)
- The Wayans Brothers: 101 Ways to Know It's Time to Get Out of Your Mama's House (2008) (Illustrator)
- The Wayans Brothers: 101 Ways to Know You're a Golddigger (2009) (Illustrator)
- Sing Along with Leedo and Booey (2014) (Illustrator)

== Art exhibitions ==
=== Gallery 1988, (Los Angeles, CA) ===
- Under The Influence: He-Man and the Masters of the Universe Art Show (2010)
- Another Dimension, Twilight Zone Art Show (2010)

=== Lulubell Toy Bodega (Tucson, AZ) ===
- Toy (Re)collections Robot Art Show (2010)

=== Meltdown (Los Angeles, CA) ===
- Meat! Art Show (2011)

=== Q-Pop (Los Angeles, CA) ===
- BEAM ME UP: Star Trek Art Show (2013)
- James Bond: 50 Years of 007 Art Celebration (2013)

=== Chuck Jones Gallery (San Diego, CA) ===
- What's Up Doc? The Animation Art of Chuck Jones, Smithsonian Art Preview ft. Girls Drawin' Girls & 6 Point Harness (2014)

== Awards ==
- Promax BDA International Bronze Award, Illustrator, WKBD-TV50, Detroit Tiger Billboards (1996)
- Telly Award, Ohio Lottery Animated Commercial, Duck Studios (2004)
