= Totally Committed =

Live album by Jeff Foxworthy
- Released: May 19, 1998
- Recorded: Taft Theatre February 1998
- Genre: Comedy
- Length: 57:49
- Label: Warner Bros.
- Producer: Jeff Foxworthy; James Hollihan, Jr. J. P. Williams

Jeff Foxworthy chronology
| Crank It Up: The Music Album (1996) | Totally Committed (1998) | Greatest Bits (1999) |

Professional ratings
Review scores
| Source | Rating |
|---|---|
| Allmusic | 3/5 stars |

Totally Committed is an album by American comedian Jeff Foxworthy. It was released by Warner Bros. Records on May 19, 1998. The album peaked at number 50 on the Billboard 200 chart and has been certified Gold by the RIAA.

== Track listing ==
All tracks written by Jeff Foxworthy and Ritch Shydner except where noted.

1. "Introduction" – 0:31
2. "You Can't Give Rednecks Money" – 1:48
3. "Sophisticated People vs. Rednecks" – 6:18
4. "Faded Genes" – 1:26
5. "I Still Don't Know…" – 10:25
6. "The Rules of Marriage" – 10:38
7. "Protect Our Stuff" – 5:24
8. "Every Single Hair on Her Body" – 5:53
9. "I Don't Want to Be Single Again" – 8:30
10. "Encore" – 3:36
11. "Totally Committed" (Foxworthy, James Hollihan, Jr.) – 3:20
  - featuring Tim Rushlow

== Charts ==
=== Weekly charts ===
| Chart (1998) | Peak position |
|---|---|
| Canadian Country Albums (RPM) | 21 |
| US Billboard 200 | 50 |
| US Top Country Albums (Billboard) | 8 |

=== Year-end charts ===
| Chart (1998) | Position |
|---|---|
| US Top Country Albums (Billboard) | 37 |
