= You Might Be a Redneck If... =

You Might Be a Redneck If…

Live album by Jeff Foxworthy
- Released: June 15, 1993
- Recorded: 1992
- Genre: Comedy
- Length: 49:31
- Label: Warner Bros.
- Producer: Jeff Foxworthy (exec.)

Jeff Foxworthy chronology
You Might Be a Redneck If… (1993)	Games Rednecks Play (1995)

You Might Be a Redneck If… is an album by American comedian Jeff Foxworthy. It was released by Warner Bros. Records on June 15, 1993. The album peaked at number 38 on the Billboard 200 chart and has been certified 3× Platinum by the RIAA. The album was recorded at the Majestic Theatre in Dallas, Texas.

As of 2014, sales in the United States have exceeded 2,055,000 copies, according to Nielsen SoundScan.

== Track listing ==
All tracks are written by Jeff Foxworthy.

No.	Title	Length
1.	"Intro"	0:33
2.	"Words in the South"	2:15
3.	"You Might Be a Redneck If..."	2:43
4.	"Life as a Father"	9:41
5.	"Single Life Is Just Too Hard"	12:12
6.	"I Love Being Married"	16:46
7.	"You Might Be a Redneck If... Pt. 2"	2:21
Total length:		46:31

Note: On the cassette version, "Single Life Is Just Too Hard" is split between Sides A and B.

== Personnel ==
Compiled from liner notes.

- David Boyd – cover art
- Jeff Foxworthy – executive production
- Doug Grau – editing
- Ronnie Thomas – editing
- Hank Williams – mastering

== Charts ==
=== Weekly charts ===
Chart (1993–95)	Peak position
US Billboard 200	38
US Top Country Albums (Billboard)	3
US Heatseekers Albums (Billboard)	1

=== Year-end charts ===
Chart (1994)	Position
US Top Country Albums (Billboard)	50
Chart (1995)	Position
US Billboard 200	52
US Top Country Albums (Billboard)	5
Chart (1996)	Position
US Top Country Albums (Billboard)	40
