= Jeff Foxworthy =

American comedian, actor, and writer (born 1958)

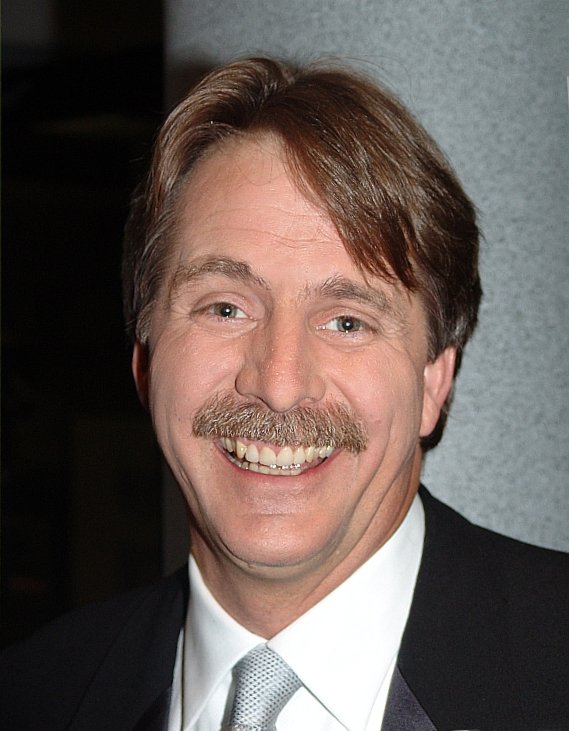
- Foxworthy in 2001
- Born: Jeffrey Marshall Foxworthy; September 6, 1958 (age 68); Atlanta, Georgia, U.S.
- Occupations: Stand-up comedian; actor; writer; radio host; television host
- Spouse: Pamela Gregg (m. 1985)
- Children: 2

Comedy career
- Years active: 1982–present
- Medium: Stand-up; film; radio; television
- Genres: Observational; word play; sitcom
- Subjects: Marriage; Southern culture; everyday life; family; rednecks
- Website: jefffoxworthy.com

Jeffrey Marshall Foxworthy (born September 6, 1958) is an American stand-up comedian, actor, writer and radio and television host. He is a member of the Blue Collar Comedy Tour, with Larry the Cable Guy, Bill Engvall, and formerly Ron White. Known for his "You might be a redneck" one-liners, Foxworthy has released six major-label comedy albums. His first two albums were each certified triple Platinum by the Recording Industry Association of America. He has written several books based on his redneck jokes, as well as an autobiography titled No Shirt, No Shoes... No Problem!

Foxworthy has also made several ventures into television, starting in the mid-1990s with his own sitcom called The Jeff Foxworthy Show. He has also appeared alongside Engvall and Larry the Cable Guy in several Blue Collar television specials, including Blue Collar TV for The WB. In addition, he hosted the game shows Are You Smarter than a 5th Grader? and The American Bible Challenge, and the radio program The Foxworthy Countdown.

== Early life ==
Jeffrey Marshall Foxworthy was born in Atlanta, Georgia, on September 6, 1958, the first of three children of Carole Linda (née Camp) and IBM executive Jimmy Abstance Foxworthy. His grandfather, James Marvin Camp, was a Hapeville firefighter for over three decades. He has two younger siblings, Jay Foxworthy and Jennifer Foxworthy.

Foxworthy graduated from Hapeville High School. He attended Georgia Institute of Technology in Atlanta, but left just before graduating. He worked for five years in mainframe computer maintenance at IBM, where his father also worked. At the urging of IBM co-workers, Foxworthy entered and won the Great Southeastern Laugh-off at Atlanta's Punchline comedy club in 1984.

== Career ==
=== Comedy albums ===
In 1993, he released You Might Be a Redneck If…, which topped the comedy albums chart and started the "You Might Be a Redneck" fad. The album went gold in 1994, platinum by 1995, and 3× platinum by 1996, which is more than three million copies.

Foxworthy's July 1995 release Games Rednecks Play received a 1996 Grammy nomination for Best Spoken Comedy Album.

Totally Committed was released in May 1998. In conjunction with the album was a one-hour HBO stand-up special by the same name. The album reached "gold" status and received a 1999 Grammy Award nomination. The video for the Totally Committed song featured frequent references to then-Atlanta Braves pitcher, Greg Maddux as well as an appearance at the very end by Maddux himself (along with teammate John Smoltz).

In 2001, Foxworthy received a nomination for Best Spoken Comedy Album for the 43rd Annual Grammys.

=== Television ===
In 1995, Foxworthy starred in The Jeff Foxworthy Show, a sitcom created out of his stand-up comedy persona. It aired on ABC, but was canceled after one season. NBC subsequently picked up the show, but it was again canceled after one season. Later, he remarked that the network did not understand how to properly market his humor; thinking his routine was "too Southern" for a national network, they based the first season of his sitcom in Bloomington, Indiana. Later, the series aired on Nick at Nite and CMT in 2005 and 2006. He also appeared in Alan Jackson's video for "I Don't Even Know Your Name" in 1995.

Foxworthy hosted Country Weekly's "TNN Music City News Country Awards" show for 1998, 1999, and 2000. In 1998, Foxworthy appeared on the mock talk show Space Ghost Coast to Coast, where he attempts to explain his famous "You might be a Redneck" joke to Space Ghost, yet fails entirely. Throughout the episode, Space Ghost, Zorak, and Moltar are taking the Ghost Planet to the US, with plans to make it the 51st state. By the end of the episode Foxworthy is sent to "The Box".

Foxworthy was the subject of a Comedy Central Roast in 2005. From 2007 to 2015, he hosted Are You Smarter than A 5th Grader? on Fox in prime time. He also hosted the syndicated version of the series from September 21, 2009, until its cancellation on March 24, 2011. In 2015 it was announced that Foxworthy would return as host of Are You Smarter than a 5th Grader? In addition, he is a host on The Bucks of Tecomate which airs on the NBC Sports Network with Alabama native David Morris.

In 2011, Foxworthy appeared as a guest "Shark" for two episodes of ABC's second season of Shark Tank. From August 23, 2012, to July 17, 2014, Foxworthy was the host and a producer of the GSN biblical-themed game show The American Bible Challenge, which aired three seasons. He is also the host of the food reality competition series The American Baking Competition, which aired its first season in summer 2013.

Foxworthy has appeared as host and featured guest on several programs on the Outdoor Channel and Versus.

In February 2019, Foxworthy was announced as a judge for NBC's comedy competition series Bring the Funny. In 2020, a new episode of Ellen's Game of Games featured Jeff Foxworthy on a game of Stink Tank.

=== Blue Collar Comedy ===
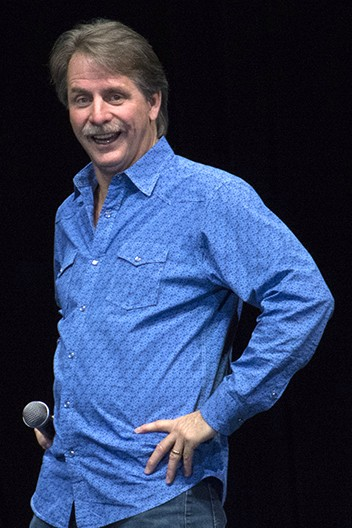
Foxworthy in performance at the Resch Center in Green Bay in 2015

In the early 2000s, Foxworthy had a career resurgence as a result of the Blue Collar Comedy Tour, in which he and three other comedians (Larry the Cable Guy, Ron White, and Bill Engvall), specializing in common-man comedy, toured the country and performed for record crowds. The tour lasted six full years, constantly being extended after an initial run of 20 shows. It also spawned three films and a satellite radio show.

In 2004, he launched a new television series called Blue Collar TV on The WB. He served as executive producer and starred alongside Blue Collar Comedy Tour-mates Larry the Cable Guy and Bill Engvall. (Ron White made occasional guest appearances.) On Larry the Cable Guy's website, he posted that the show was canceled on October 17, 2005, by The WB. Reruns of Blue Collar TV continued until the network merged with UPN to form The CW. In 2006, Foxworthy resurrected the Blue Collar TV format on Country Music Television (CMT) with Foxworthy's Big Night Out. The show began airing in the fall and was canceled after one season of 12 episodes.

=== Voice work ===
Foxworthy has voiced characters in several films including Racing Stripes (2005), The Fox and the Hound 2 (2006), The Aviators (2008), The Smurfs (2011), The Smurfs 2 (2013), and The Garfield Movie (2024).

=== Books and written works ===
Foxworthy has authored several books, including You Might Be a Redneck If... (1989), Hick is Chic (1990), Red Ain't Dead (1991), Check Your Neck (1992), You're Not a Kid Anymore (1993), Games Rednecks Play (1994), as well as his autobiography, No Shirt, No Shoes, No Problem! (1996). Artist Layron DeJarnette provided illustrations for several of the books. R. David Boyd has been the exclusive illustrator for most of Foxworthy's books and album covers.

Foxworthy followed up with You Might Be A Redneck If ... This Is The Biggest Book You’ve Ever Read (2004), and released a Christmas book (with a CD included) called There's No Place Like (A Mobile) Home For The Holidays (2004). He also has released a cookbook entitled The Redneck Grill (2005), co-authored with Newnan, Georgia, artist R. David Boyd, and "Redneck Extreme Mobile Home Makeover" (2005), a book with some of his redneck jokes.

He also released three books about southern dialect:

- Jeff Foxworthy's Redneck Dictionary: Words You Thought You Knew the Meaning Of (2005)
- Jeff Foxworthy's Redneck Dictionary II: More Words You Thought You Knew the Meaning Of (2006)
- Jeff Foxworthy's Redneck Dictionary III: Learning to Talk More Gooder Fastly (2007)

In February 2008, Foxworthy released his first children's book Dirt On My Shirt. This was followed by Silly Street in 2009 and Hide!!! in 2010, both of which were illustrated by Steve Bjorkman.

In May 2008, Foxworthy released How to Really Stink at Golf, with co-author Brian Hartt and illustrations by Layron DeJarnette. In May 2009, he released How to Really Stink at Work, A Guide to Making Yourself Fire-Proof While Having the Most Fun Possible. This book was also co-authored with Hartt and illustrations by DeJarnette.

=== Radio work ===
In April 1999, Foxworthy began The Foxworthy Countdown, a nationally syndicated, weekly radio show, which featured the top 30 country hits of the week, as reported by Mediabase. In 2001, he received a Country Music Association nomination for "Broadcast Personality of the Year". The program's last broadcast, the 2009 year-end countdown, aired the weekend of December 27, 2009. In 2006, Sirius Satellite Radio launched the Blue Collar Comedy channel, which featured stand-up comedy centered around the Blue Collar group. In 2015, now under the SiriusXM banner, the station rebranded as Jeff & Larry's Comedy Roundup, which featured similar programming to the previous channel with an enhanced focus on Foxworthy and Larry the Cable Guy.

=== Foxworthy Outdoors ===
In August 2011, Foxworthy launched Foxworthy Outdoors, a website carrying an assortment of Foxworthy-brand hunting and outdoors products. On the site, he also hosts a web series called Jeff Foxworthy: Inside & Out, featuring some of his friends as they document hunting trips, fishing outings, and land conservation on his Georgia farm.

=== Comedy specials ===
In March 2022, Foxworthy's special, Jeff Foxworthy: The Good Old Days, was released on Netflix. Foxworthy's special, Jeff Foxworthy: The Joke's On Me, was released to stream on Fox Nation on June 1, 2026.

=== Other ===
In 2017, Foxworthy created the card game Relative Insanity, a game similar to Cards Against Humanity with a family theme. Family Game Shelf praised the game, saying "it will have you laughing until your sides hurt". He followed up with the games Relative Insanity 2nd Generation and Relative Insanity See What I Mean.

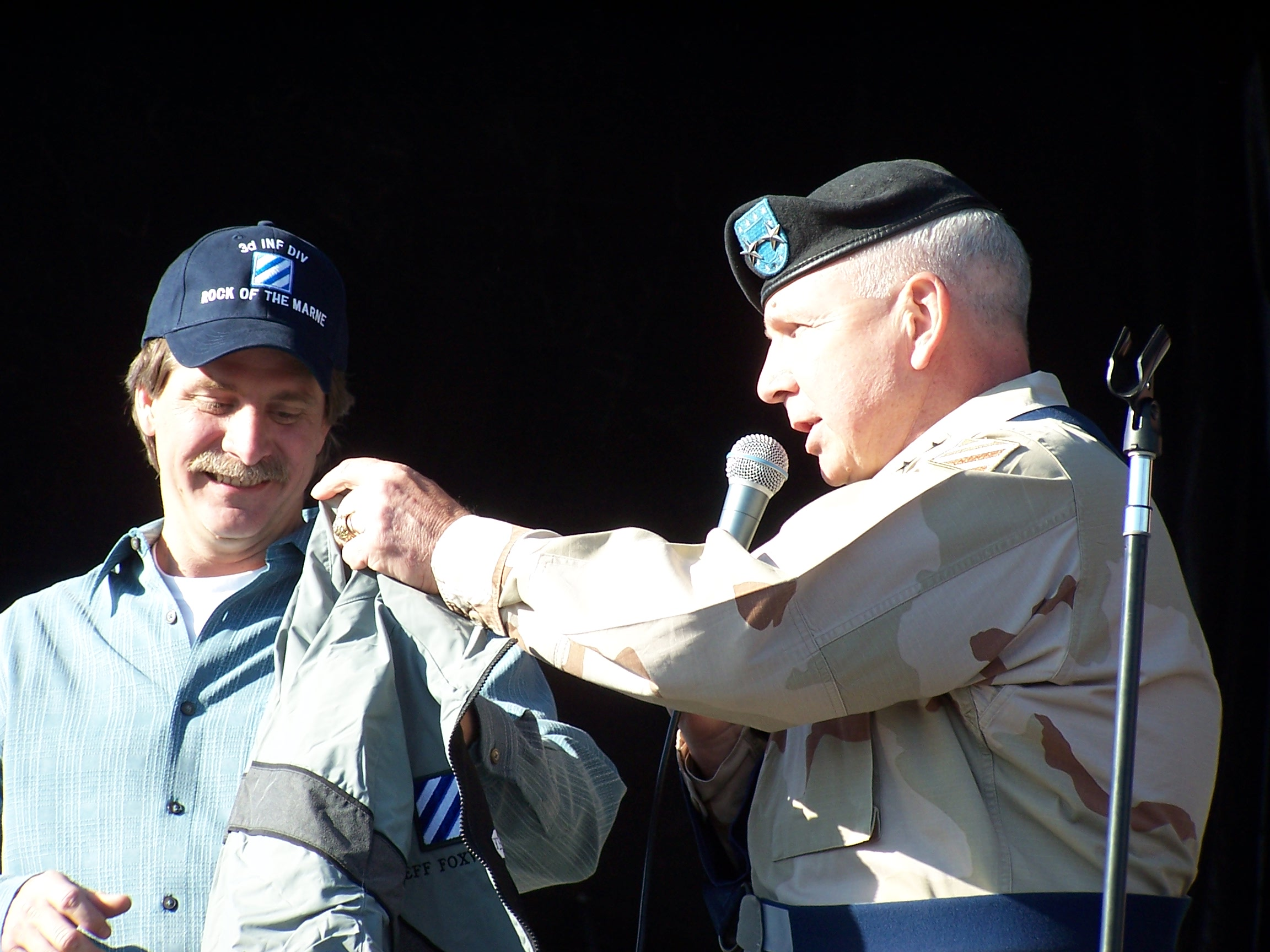
Foxworthy accepting a new jacket from 3rd Infantry Division Commander Army Maj. Gen. William G. Webster for his support

== Personal life ==
Foxworthy met his wife Pamela Gregg at the Punchline in Atlanta, Georgia, and they married on September 18, 1985. They have two daughters, Jordan and Julianne. He is a noted hunting enthusiast, beginning when he was a teen hunting on his father's farm property in Central Georgia.

=== Politics ===
Foxworthy claims to keep his jokes apolitical and has criticized the memes circulating on social media that appear to show him making jokes at the expense of liberals in his stand-up. Despite this, he donated to the presidential campaign of George W. Bush, as well as the Republican National Committee in the 2000s. In 2012, Foxworthy endorsed Republican presidential candidate Mitt Romney. In 2015, he stated Donald Trump "was tapping into the American spirit".

== Discography ==
Albums

- You Might Be a Redneck If... (1993)
- Games Rednecks Play (1995)
- Crank It Up: The Music Album (1996)
- Totally Committed (1998)
- Big Funny (2000)
- Have Your Loved Ones Spayed or Neutered (2004)

== Filmography ==
=== Film ===
Year	Title	Role	Notes
2003	Blue Collar Comedy Tour: The Movie	Himself	
2005	Racing Stripes	Reggie	Voice role
2005	Ron White, Jeff Foxworthy & Bill Engvall: Live from Las Vegas!	Himself	Direct-to-video
2006	The Fox and the Hound 2	Lyle Snodgrass	Voice role
2008	The Aviators	Lindbergh	Voice role
2010	I Am Comic	Himself	Documentary
2011	The Smurfs	Handy	Voice role
2013	The Smurfs 2	Handy	Voice role
2013	Crackerjack	Narrator	
2013	Hatched	Charlie Horse	Voice role
2016	The Gate	Narrator	Short film
2016	Ozzy	Grunt	Voice role
2017	Bunyan and Babe	Babe the Blue Ox	Voice role
2024	The Garfield Movie	Shocked bird	Voice role

=== Television ===
Year	Title	Role	Notes
1993	Jeff Foxworthy: Check Your Neck	Himself	TV special
1993	Banner Time	Jeff	TV movie
1995	A.J.'s Time Travelers	Thomas Jefferson	"Thomas Jefferson"
1995–1997	The Jeff Foxworthy Show	Himself	series regular (41 episodes)
1996	Cybill	Lyle Clocum	"Pal Zoey"
1996	Funniest Comedy Duos	Himself	TV movie
1996	23rd Annual AMA Awards	Himself (host)	TV special
1997	The Larry Sanders Show	Himself	"Larry's New Love"
1997	ESPY Awards	Himself (host)	TV special
1998	Jeff Foxworthy: Totally Committed	Himself	TV special
2000–2003	Scruff	Peter	
2004	Blue Collar Comedy Tour Rides Again	Himself	TV special
2004–2006	Blue Collar TV	Various characters	series regular (45 episodes)
2005	Reno 911!	Fast Eddie McClintock (voice)	"Fastest Criminal in Reno"
2005	Extreme Makeover: Home Edition	Himself	"The Harper Family"
2005	Comedy Central Roast of Jeff Foxworthy	Himself	TV special
2005	2005 CMT Music Awards	Himself (host)	TV special
2006	Blue Collar Comedy Tour: One for the Road	Himself	TV special
2007	American Idol	Himself	(Season 6) "Finale"
2007–2015	Are You Smarter than a 5th Grader?	Himself (host)	series regular (111 episodes)
2008	Larry the Cable Guy's Star-Studded Christmas Extravaganze	Himself	TV special
2009	Comedy Central Roast of Larry the Cable Guy	Himself	TV special
2009	Biography	Himself	"Larry the Cable Guy"
2010	Blue Collar Comedy: Ten Years of Funny	Himself	TV movie
2011	Shark Tank	Himself (shark)	2 episodes: "#2.4", "#2.7"
2012	Phineas and Ferb	Southern Meap (voice)	"Meapless in Seattle"
2012-2014	The American Bible Challenge	Himself (host)	series regular (27 episodes)
2013	Bounty Hunters	Jeff	series regular (13 episodes)
2013	The American Baking Competition	Himself (host)	5 episodes
2016	Jeff Foxworthy & Larry the Cable Guy: We've Been Thinking	Himself	TV special
2018	Jay Leno's Garage	Himself	"Down and Dirty"
2019	Biography	Himself	"Jeff Foxworthy"
2019	Bring the Funny	Himself (judge)	2 episodes
2020	Scooby-Doo and Guess Who?	Himself (voice)	"The Wedding Witch of Wainsly Hall!"
2020	What's It Worth?	Himself	10 episodes
2022	The Good Old Days	Himself	Netflix Special
2026	Jeff Foxworthy: The Joke's On Me	Himself	Fox Nation

=== Writing credits ===
Year	Title	Notes
1993	Jeff Foxworthy: Check Your Neck	TV special
1996	Games Rednecks Play	Short Film
1996–1997	The Jeff Foxworthy Show	3 episodes — "Before You Say 'No' Just Hear Me Out" (1996) — "One Wedding and a Baby" (1996) — "The Briarton Syndrom" (1997)
1998	Jeff Foxworthy: Totally Committed	TV special
2000	Bill Engvall's New All Stars of Country Comedy Vol. 1	Direct-to-Video
2003	Blue Collar Comedy Tour: The Movie	
2004	Blue Collar Comedy Tour Rides Again	TV special
2004–2006	Blue Collar TV	Creator (44 episodes); Writer (43 episodes)
2005	Ron White, Jeff Foxworthy & Bill Engvall: Live from Las Vegas!	Direct-to-Video
2006	Blue Collar Comedy Tour: One for the Road	TV special
2006	Foxworthy's Big Night Out	"Kenny Rogers"
2012	Them Idiots Whirled Tour	TV special

=== Producing credits ===
Year	Title	Notes
1993	Jeff Foxworthy: Check Your Neck	TV special (Executive Producer)
2004–2006	Blue Collar TV	Executive Producer (45 episodes)
2007–2015	Are You Smarter than a 5th Grader?	Executive Producer (12 episodes); Producer (12 episodes)
2013	Crackerjack	Executive Producer
2013	Bounty Hunters	Executive Producer (13 episodes)
2016	Jeff Foxworthy & Larry the Cable Guy: We've Been Thinking	TV special (Executive Producer)

== Accolades ==
Year	Title	Association / Category	Results	Ref
1990	—N/a	American Comedy Award for Funniest Male Stand-Up Comic	Won	
1994	Jeff Foxworthy: Check Your Neck	CableACE Award for Stand-Up Comedy Special	Nominated	
1996	Games Rednecks Play	Grammy Award for Best Spoken Comedy Album	Nominated	
1996	The Jeff Foxworthy Show	People's Choice Award for Favorite Male Performer in a New TV Series (tied with Drew Carey)	Won	
1997	Redneck Games	Grammy Award for Best Country Collaboration with Vocals (shared with Alan Jackson)	Nominated	
1999	Totally Committed	Grammy Award for Best Spoken Comedy Album	Nominated	
2001	Big Funny	Grammy Award for Best Spoken Comedy Album	Nominated	
2007	Blue Collar Comedy Tour: One for the Road	Grammy Award for Best Comedy Album (shared with Bill Engvall, Ron White & Larry the Cable Guy)	Nominated	
2010	Are You Smarter Than a 5th Grader?	Daytime Emmy Award for Outstanding Game/Audience Participation Show	Nominated	
2014	The American Bible Challenge	Daytime Emmy Award for Outstanding Game Show	Nominated	
2014	The American Bible Challenge	Daytime Emmy Award for Outstanding Game Show Host	Nominated	

== See also ==
- List of stand-up comedians
- List of game show hosts

== Notes ==
Preceded by None	Host of Are You Smarter Than A 5th Grader; 2007-2011, 2015	Succeeded by John Cena
