= Tomalin =

Tomalin is a surname (which originated as a diminutive of Thomas or Tom). Notable people with the surname include:

- Claire Tomalin (born 1933), English author and journalist
- Doug Tomalin, (1914–1998), English diver
- Elisabeth Tomalin (1912–2012), British artist
- Nicholas Tomalin (1931–1973), British journalist and writer
- Paul Tomalin, British television screenwriter
- Philip Tomalin (1856–1940), French cricketer
- Ruth Tomalin (1919–2012), British journalist, novelist, and children's author
- James Tomalin (born 1972), British composer and music producer
- Susan Sarandon (born 1946), born Susan Tomalin, American actress

== See also ==
- Tomlin, a similar surname
