= Tomlin =

Tomlin is an English surname. Notable people with the surname include:

- Alison Tomlin, British physical chemist and applied mathematician
- Andrew J. Tomlin (1845–1906), American Marine; recipient of the Medal of Honor for action in the American Civil War
- Bradley Walker Tomlin (1899–1955), American abstract expressionist painter
- Chris Tomlin (born 1972), American Christian singer and songwriter
- Claire J. Tomlin (born 1969), American systems researcher
- Dave Tomlin (born 1949), American professional baseball player
- E. W. F. Tomlin (1913–1988), British essayist
- Gary Tomlin (contemporary), American television soap opera writer and producer
- Gavin Tomlin (born 1983), English professional football player
- George Napier Tomlin (1875–1947), British naval officer
- Graham Tomlin (born 1958), British Anglican priest and author; Dean of St. Mellitus College
- Jacob Tomlin (fl. 19th century), British author and missionary to China in the 19th century
- John Read le Brockton Tomlin (1864–1954), British malacologist
- Lee Tomlin (born 1989), English professional football player
- Lily Tomlin (born 1939), American actress and comedian
- Mattson Tomlin (born 1990), Romanian screenwriter and producer
- Mike Tomlin (born 1972), American professional football coach
- Mollie Tomlin (1923–2009), Australian watercolor artist
- Pinky Tomlin (1907–1987), American jazz musician and actor
- Randy Tomlin (born 1956), American professional baseball player
- Ray S. Tomlin (fl. 1889–1929), American educator; president of Paine College in Augusta, Georgia
- Robyn Tomlin (born 1971), American journalist and newspaper editor
- Thomas Tomlin, Baron Tomlin (1867–1935), British jurist
- William Tomlin, (1866–1910) English cricketer

== Fictional characters ==
- Vernon Tomlin, character on the British soap opera Coronation Street

== See also ==
- Tomalin, a similar surname
