= George Napier Tomlin =

Vice-Admiral George Napier Tomlin CMG MVO (25 July 1875 – 7 May 1947) was a British naval officer.

== Private life ==
In 1911, when Commander George Napier Tomlin was with Medina, his engagement was announced in The Sketch to Miss Violet Seymour Osborne.

== Career ==
George Napier Tomlin went straight to sea from HMS Britannia, and was in two actions ashore on the west coast of Africa as a 17-year-old midshipman. He was promoted to lieutenant on 31 December 1896, and in March 1900 was appointed to HMS Rainbow, in charge of navigation.

In 1911–1912 he navigated HMS Medina, with King George V and Queen Mary on board, to India and back for the 1911 Delhi Durbar, for which he received the MVO. After the Armistice he was given command of an Allied squadron in the Black Sea, which was responsible for seeing that the terms of the Armistice were carried out. For his services in this connection, he was awarded the CMG. Subsequently he commanded the battleship HMS Canada, built for the Chilean Navy, and later handed over to them. His experience during that transaction led to his being "lent" to the Chilean Navy for two years to found a Naval War College after a period on the staff of the corresponding organization at Greenwich. He commanded Malaya in the Mediterranean, was promoted to rear-admiral in 1927 and lent to the Egyptian Government for seven years with the titles of Admiral and Pasha. He retired in 1934.

His service record is as follows:

Ship	Dates	Post	
Anson	1st class battleship – Admiral class	June 1890 – August 1891	Midshipman
Raleigh	2nd class cruiser	1891–1894	Midshipman
Philomel	3rd class cruiser – Pearl class	August 1894 – November 1894	Sub-Lieutenant
Liberty	Sailing brig	March 1896 – November 1896	Sub-Lieutenant
Imogene	Yacht	November 1896 –January 1900	Lieutenant
Sirius	2nd class cruiser – Apollo class	March 1900 – September 1900	Lieutenant
Phaeton	2nd class cruiser – Leander class	October 1900 – September 1903	Lieutenant
Hood	1st class battleship	September 1903– July 1904	Lieutenant
Magnificent	1st class battleship – Majestic class	July 1904 – November 1906	Lieutenant
Excellent	Gunnery shore establishment	1907	Lieutenant
Albemarle	1st class battleship – Duncan class	February 1909 – November 1909	Commander
Formidable	1st class battleship – Formidable class	November 1909 – January 1910	Commander
Albemarle	1st class battleship – Duncan class	January 1910 – November 1911	Commander
Medina		November 1911 – 1912	
Navigation school Portsmouth		1913	
Victoria and Albert (?)	Royal Yacht	January 1914 – August 1914	Commander
Agincourt	Dreadnought battleship	August 1914 – 1915	Commander
Agincourt	Dreadnought battleship	1915–1916	Captain
?
Liverpool	Light cruiser – Town class	November 1918 – March 1919	Captain
Canada	Super-dreadnought battleship	April 1919 – 1920	Captain(?)
Senior Officer’s War Course at Greenwich		1921–1923	Training staff
Chilean Naval War College		1924(?) – 1925(?)	Training staff
Malaya	Super-dreadnought battleship – Queen Elizabeth class	1926(?)	Captain(?)
Egyptian Navy		1927–34	Admiral and Pasha

== Medals ==
Tomlin's medals were put up for sale in 2007, and described as follows:

"A highly important group of Medals and Orders to Rear Admiral George Napier Tomlin (1875-1947), comprising CMG, MVO East and West Africa Medal Benin River 1894, Gambia 1894 (G.N. TOMLIN. MID RN HMS RALEIGH), 1914-15 Trio MID CAPTAIN RN, Delhi Burbar Medal 1911, Chilean Order "AL MERITO" 2nd Class; Order of Leopold II (Grand Officer), Order of the Gown of Italy (Grand Officer (neck badge and breast star), Order of the Nile 2nd Class (neck badge and breast star), together with companion group of miniatures mounted as worn, his naval sword and naval dirk and a copy photograph. Captain George Napier Tomlin HMS Liverpool Commanding Allied Squadron in support of the White Army during the Russian Civil War. Known to have been in Touapse and Novorossisk during November 1918".
