= Far Away and Long Ago =

- Directed by: Manuel Antín
- Written by: Mario Reynoso
- Based on: Far Away and Long Ago by William Henry Hudson
- Starring: Gianni Lunadei, Juan José Camero, Leonor Manso, Dora Baret, Walter Santa Anna, Osvaldo Terranova, Ariel Keller, Augusto Kretschmar, Augusto Larreta, Jorge Sassi, Susu Pecoraro, Rodolfo Brindisi, Horacio Denner, Mercedes Obligado, Inés Murray, Enrique Vargas, Aldo Calzetta, Alejandro Lunadei, Rita Terranova, Enrique Alonso
- Edited by: Darío Tedesco
- Music by: Gerardo Gandini
- Release date: 1978
- Running time: 110 minutes
- Country: Argentina
- Language: Spanish

Far Away and Long Ago (Spanish: Allá lejos y hace tiempo) is a 1978 Argentine film based on the memoir of the same title by Anglo-Argentine author William Henry Hudson.
