= Storm Jameson =

English journalist and author

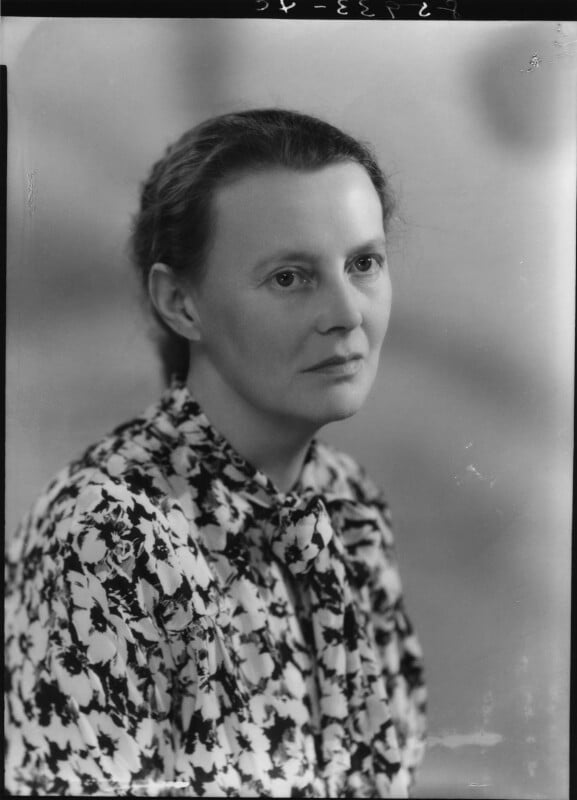
- Jameson in 1939
- Born: Margaret Ethel Jameson; 8 January 1891; Whitby, Yorkshire, England
- Died: 30 September 1986 (aged 95)
- Occupations: Journalist and author
- Spouse: Guy Chapman (m. 1926)

Margaret Ethel ('Storm') Jameson (8 January 1891 – 30 September 1986) was an English journalist and author, known for her novels and reviews and for her work as President of English PEN between 1938 and 1944.

== Life and career ==
Jameson was born in Whitby, Yorkshire, in 1891, the eldest child of sea captain and former shipbuilder William Storm Jameson and his wife Hannah Margaret Galilee, from a family of wealthy Whitby shipbuilders; she briefly attended school at the Scarborough Municipal, before studying at the University of Leeds. Graduating first in her year, she won a scholarship to King's College London in 1914. It was during this time that she began seriously to write, producing her first novel The Pot Boils in 1919. Her dissertation on 'Modern Drama in Europe' was also published in 1920 to significant critical acclaim. It expressed, for the first time, her interest in European literature and her sense of its impact on Britain. She went on to write 48 novels, three autobiographies, several screenplays and a wealth of journalistic articles for national and international publications.

Jameson was President of the English branch of PEN International from 1938 until ill-health forced her to retire in 1944. She remained an active member and PEN International Vice President until her death in 1986. During her time as president she founded the PEN Refugee Writers Fund, which helped hundreds of refugee writers and their families to flee occupied Europe during World War Two. She also worked to try to bridge gaps within PEN during the Cold War, working to keep Communist states within the organisation in order to allow PEN to protect writers' rights in countries where many were being challenged and even killed. Additionally, she was a founding member of the Peace Pledge Union, although she recanted her views in the mid-1930s believing that war was the only way forward to what she hoped would be a fairer and more equal Europe.

Jameson became active in politics at University and remained a committed socialist throughout her life, but her distrust of "groupthink" and passion for the rights of free expression and the liberty of the individual prevented her from following any of the political creeds that were in vogue at the time: Jameson was never a communist, a fascist or, really, a pacifist.

Jameson's collection of novellas, Women Against Men, was admired by The Times reviewer, Harold Strauss, who stated, "So completely is she the master of her art, so instinctively the craftsman, so superlatively the selective artist, that a restrained evaluation of her work is difficult for a student of the novel." Jameson wrote the introduction to the 1952 British edition of The Diary of Anne Frank.

Jameson's novel Last Score was praised by Ben Ray Redman in the Saturday Review of Literature. Redman described Last Score as "one of Storm Jameson's best" and stated "it is the complex web of human relationships that give this novel its breadth and depth".

While her work was highly praised in her lifetime and she was a well-known figure, working at PEN with H.G. Wells, E.M. Forster, Rebecca West, and countless others, Jameson's work and achievements were largely forgotten by critics and readers alike. Her reputation and her work have been significantly recovered in recent years, thanks to the work of female scholars like Jennifer Birkett, Phyllis Lassner, Chiara Briganti and Elizabeth Maslen.

A biography by Jennifer Birkett, professor of French Studies at Birmingham University, was published by the Oxford University Press in March 2009. A second biography, Elizabeth Maslen's Life in the Writings of Storm Jameson: A Biography, was published in 2014 by Northwestern University Press. A critical study by Katherine Cooper, War, Nation and Europe in the Novels of Storm Jameson was published by Bloomsbury Academic in 2020.

The rebuilt Charles Morris Halls of the University of Leeds now have a building named after her, Storm Jameson Court.

Her name is one of those featured on the sculpture Ribbons, unveiled in 2024.

== Works ==
=== Mary Hervey Russell books ===
- Company Parade (1934) The Mirror in Darkness I
- Love in Winter (1935) The Mirror in Darkness II
- None Turn Back (1936) The Mirror in Darkness III
- The Journal of Mary Hervey Russell (1945)
- Before the Crossing (1947)
- The Black Laurel (1947)

=== Triumph of Time books ===
- The Lovely Ship (1927) The Triumph of Time I
- The Voyage Home (1930) The Triumph of Time II
- A Richer Dust (1931) The Triumph of Time III
- The Triumph of Time (three volumes in one) (1932)

=== Other fiction ===
- The Pot Boils (1919)
- The Happy Highways (1920)
- The Clash (1922)
- Lady Susan and Life: An Indiscretion (1923)
- The Pitiful Wife (1923)
- Three Kingdoms (1926)
- Farewell to Youth (1928)
- Full Circle: A Play in One Act (1928) drama
- The Single Heart (1932) novella
- That Was Yesterday (1932)
- Women Against Men (1933) three novellas
- A Day Off (1933) novella
- In the Second Year (1936)
- The Moon is Making (1937)
- Delicate Monster (1937)
- Loving Memory (1937) novel under the pseudonym James Hill
- The World Ends (1937) novel under the pseudonym William Lamb
- Here Comes a Candle (1938)
- No Victory For the Soldier (1938) novel under the pseudonym James Hill
- Farewell Night, Welcome Day (1939) (published in the United States as The Captain's Wife)
- Cousin Honoré (1940)
- Europe to Let (1940)
- The Fort (1941)
- Then We Shall Hear Singing: A Fantasy in C Major (1942)
- Cloudless May (1943)
- The Other Side (1946)
- The Moment of Truth (1949)
- The Green Man (1952)
- The Hidden River (1955)
- The Intruder (1956)
- A Cup of Tea for Mr. Thorgill (1957)
- A Ulysses Too Many (1958)
- A Day Off (1959) short novels, stories
- Last Score, or the Private Life of Sir Richard Ormston (1961)
- The Road from the Monument (1962)
- A Month Soon Goes (1962)
- The Aristide Case (1964; published in the U.S. as The Blind Heart)
- The Early Life of Stephen Hind (1966)
- The White Crow (1968)
- There Will Be A Short Interval (1973)

=== Non-fiction ===
- Modern Drama in Europe (1920) criticism
- The Georgian Novel and Mr. Robinson (1929) criticism
- The Decline of Merry England (1930) history
- The Novel in Contemporary Life (1938) critical essay
- No Time Like the Present (1933) autobiography
- Challenge to Death (1935) editor, essays
- The Soul of Man in an Age of Leisure (1935) pamphlet
- Civil Journey (1939) essays
- The End of This War (1941) essay
- London Calling : A Salute to America (1942) editor, short stories
- The Writer's Situation (1950) essays
- Morley Roberts: The Last Eminent Victorian (1961) biography
- Journey from the North (Volume 1 – 1969) (Volume 2 – 1970) autobiography
- Parthian Words (1970) criticism
- "A Kind of Survivor - A Memoir" by Guy Chapman [Edited by Storm Jameson]
- Speaking of Stendhal (1979) criticism

== Secondary literature ==
- Jennifer Birkett, Margaret Storm Jameson: A Life (Oxford: Oxford University Press, 2009)
- Jennifer Birkett and Chiara Briganti, (2007), Margaret Storm Jameson: Writing in Dialogue, (Newcastle upon Tyne: Cambridge Scholars Press, 2007).
- Katherine Cooper, War, Nation and Europe in the Novels of Storm Jameson (London: Bloomsbury, 2020)
- Elizabeth Maslen, Life in the Writings of Storm Jameson (Evanston: Northwestern University Press, 2014).
