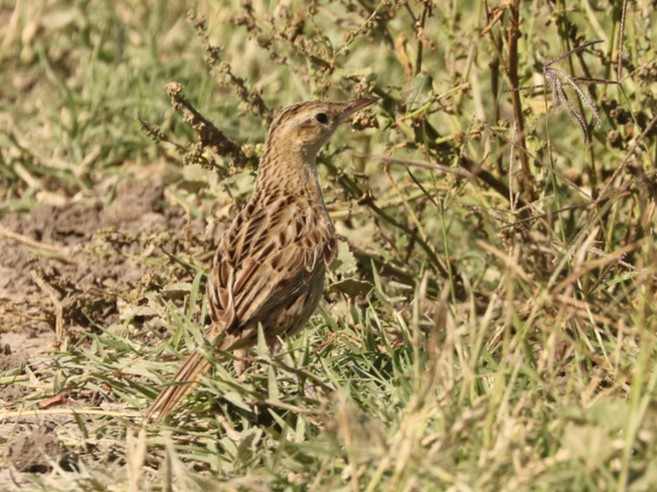
- at Dolores, Buenos Aires, Argentina

Conservation status
- Near Threatened (IUCN 3.1)

Scientific classification
- Kingdom: Animalia
- Phylum: Chordata
- Class: Aves
- Order: Passeriformes
- Family: Furnariidae
- Genus: Asthenes
- Species: A. hudsoni

Binomial name
- Asthenes hudsoni (Sclater, PL, 1874)

= Hudson's canastero =

Species of bird

Hudson's canastero (Asthenes hudsoni) is a Near Threatened species of bird in the Furnariinae subfamily of the ovenbird family Furnariidae. It is found in grasslands in Argentina, Brazil, and Uruguay.

== Taxonomy and systematics ==
Hudson's canastero is monotypic. It and the similar austral canastero (A. anthoides) are sister species that form part of groups of striped canasteros adapted to grasslands.

The English name and specific epithet of Hudson's canastero honor the Argentine-British naturalist and author William Henry Hudson.

== Description ==
Hudsons' canastero is about 18 cm (7.1 in) long. It is one of several streaked canasteros that have drab plumages with dark stripes on their upperparts. It has a long bill. The sexes have the same plumage. Adults have narrow pale buff supercilium on an otherwise sandy brownish face. Their crown and upperparts are sandy brown with conspicuous blackish and silvery streaks. Their wing's greater coverts are dark brown with whitish tips and their median and lesser coverts dark brown with wide rufous edges. Their flight feathers are dark fuscous with whitish-tawny bases on the primaries and tawny-rufous bases on the secondaries. Their tail is dusky with conspicuous silvery buff edges to the feathers. Their chin is whitish, often with a yellow tinge and sometimes an orange-rufous one. Their throat, breast, and belly are buff that is richer on their sides, flanks, and undertail coverts. Their flanks have blackish streaks. Their iris is light brown, their maxilla fuscous black, their mandible pale horn to gray with a blackish tip, and their legs and feet light brownish. Juveniles have blackish-brown streaks on their breast and sides.

== Distribution and habitat ==
Hudson's canastero is found in the southeastern part of far southern Brazil's Rio Grande do Sul state, Uruguay, and in eastern Argentina from Santa Fe and Entre Ríos provinces south to Buenos Aires Province. Records in Chubut and Rio Negro may correspond to a population that is no extinct. It inhabits temperate grasslands usually near marshes, both fresh and brackish. It favors areas with tall grasses such as Paspalum quadrifarium and sedges interspaced with short turf or bare ground. In elevation it ranges from sea level to 950 m (3,100 ft).

== Behavior ==
=== Movement ===
Although traditionally considered a year-round resident throughout its range, a recent study revealed that Hudson's canastero is a migratory species, with breeding populations mostly restricted to the pampas of Buenos Aires and an isolated population in Rio Grande do Sul. Records further north in Argentina and all records in Uruguay correspond to wintering birds.

=== Feeding ===
Hudson's canastero feeds on adult and larval arthropods. It forages singly or in pairs, gleaning its prey from the ground and low vegetation.

=== Breeding ===
Hudson's canastero breeds during the austral spring and summer, between at least October and December. It is thought to be monogamous. It builds a well-concealed dome or spherical nest of grasses and twigs over a hollow in the ground or very near it in a clump of grass. It lines the nest with feathers, hair, and small twigs. The clutch size is two to five eggs but usually three or four. The incubation period, time to fledging, and details of parental care are not known.

=== Vocalization ===
The song of Hudson's canastero is "a short ascending trill". Its call has not been described.

== Status ==
The IUCN originally in 2004 assessed Hudson's canastero as being of Least Concern but since 2011 has rated it as Near Threatened. It has a large range but its population size is not known and is believed to be decreasing. "Although this species persists in cattle pastures...[it] is primarily threatened by the on-going and accelerating loss of suitable grassland through drainage and conversion to cultivation and urban areas." It is considered uncommon to locally fairly common. "Restriction to regions with wetlands naturally limits its population size. Potentially vulnerable to drainage, pollution and other problems that affect birds of wetlands." The discovery of it migratory behavior further stresses the need for a re-evaluation of population status and trends.
