= The Daily Tar Heel =

Student newspaper of UNC-Chapel Hill

- Front page, April 21, 2006
- Type: Student newspaper
- Owner: DTH Media Corp
- Publisher: DTH Media Corp
- President: Grayson Elliott (2025–26)
- Editor-in-chief: Alli Pardue (2025–26)
- Managing editor: Sarah Monoson, Emily Gessner (2025–26)
- Founded: February 23, 1893
- Language: English
- Headquarters: Chapel Hill, North Carolina
- Country: United States
- Circulation: 10,000 (as of 2019)
- Price: Free
- ISSN: 1070-9436
- Website: dailytarheel.com

The Daily Tar Heel (DTH) is the independent student newspaper of the University of North Carolina at Chapel Hill. While focusing on university news and sports, it also includes heavy coverage of Orange County and North Carolina. All editorial content is overseen by student editors and a volunteer student staff of about 230 people.

== Circulation and organization ==
The Daily Tar Heel circulates 10,000 free copies to more than 225 distribution locations throughout campus and in surrounding communities — Chapel Hill, Carrboro, Chatham, and Durham. Dailytarheel.com draws an average of 11,400 unique visitors per school day. Revenues from advertising are self-generated through a student-run advertising staff.

Originally a daily publication, in 2016 the paper moved from five days a week in print to four, cutting the Tuesday edition. In 2017, the paper further reduced print output to Mondays, Wednesdays, and Fridays. In 2021, the paper began to print only on Wednesdays.

Student journalists are solely responsible for all content under the direction of the student editor-in-chief. The 2025-2026 editor-in-chief is Alli Pardue. A new editor is selected each spring and serves for one year. The editor-in-chief, who has full control over editorial content, is the public face of the paper and hires the rest of the editorial staff, which includes a managing editor and editors for each of the newsroom's section desks. The paper employs two full-time professionals, about 80 paid part-time students, and more than 150 student volunteer writers. Business matters are overseen by a full-time, professional general manager, Erica Perel; a board of directors serves as publisher and has final say over matters such as the newspaper's budget.

== History ==
=== Early history ===
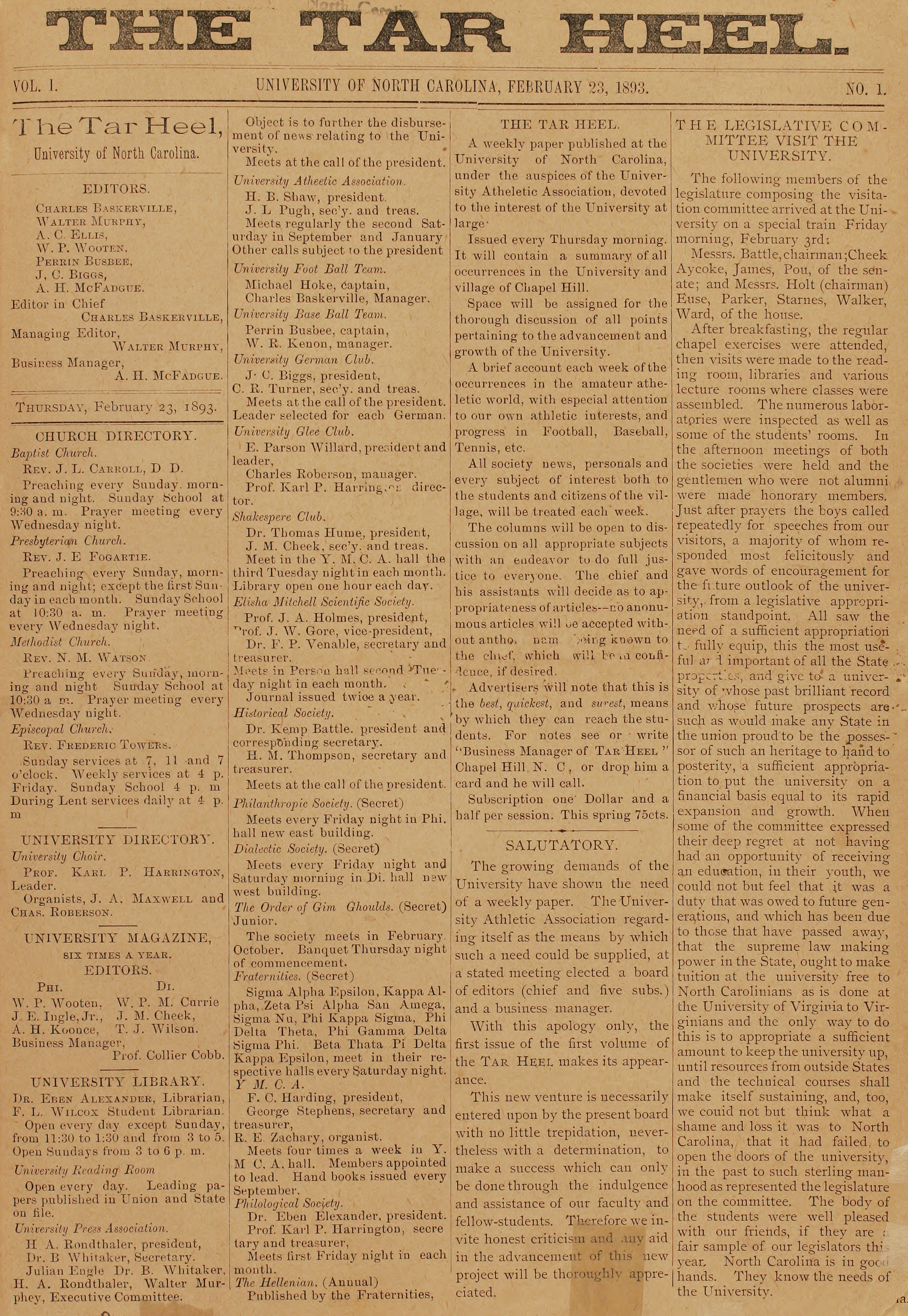
Front page of the first issue of The Tar Heel, later renamed to The Daily Tar Heel

The newspaper was first published on February 23, 1893, as a four-page weekly tabloid called The Tar Heel. It aimed to promote "the thorough discussion of all points pertaining to the advancement and growth of the University." Funded by the campus athletic association, it placed much of its emphasis on campus sports and Greek life and boasted of 250 subscribers.

By 1920, the paper's size had increased to six pages, and under editor Thomas Wolfe, the paper moved to a twice-a-week format that September. In 1923, it came out from under the auspices of the athletic association and became governed by the Student Publications Union Board, which was then in charge of all campus publications. Students paid a fee of $5.50 to fund the publications. Publication increased to three days a week in 1925, and the first summer edition was printed in 1927. In 1929, by a 666 to 128 vote, the student body voted in favor of increasing funding to the Tar Heel. This enabled the paper, then led by editor Walter Spearman, to publish six times a week. Consequently, the paper changed its name to The Daily Tar Heel.

In 1943, the paper scaled back publication to twice weekly. In 1946, The Daily Tar Heel returned to daily publication with the goal of becoming, in the words of student editors, "the greatest college newspaper in the world."

The famous broadcaster Charles Kuralt, who was DTH editor in 1954, wrote in his book A Life on the Road of being called "a pawn of the Communists" on the floor of the state legislature after the newspaper published a spoof edition critical of Sen. Joseph McCarthy. The student legislature formed a committee in 1955 to "investigate quality and circulation problems at the DTH."

=== Independence ===
In the 1970s and 1980s, student editors used the paper's front-page quote to agitate many on campus; selections included Nietzsche's "God is dead." The paper's use of student fees was called into question in July 1972, when four students filed suit against the paper. The students objected to the use of student fees used to publish articles they did not agree with. The DTH collected donations to pay for its legal defense, and ultimately won an assurance of at least 16 percent of all student fees in 1977. An independent publishing board was also established, though the paper's budget remained tied to the Student Congress for yearly approval.

In 1989, the DTH incorporated as a separate educational 501(c)(3) non-profit entity. The paper voluntarily stopped taking student fee money in 1993, making it completely financially independent from the university for the first time. That allowed the DTH to begin its current process of allowing an 11-member committee of staffers and community members to select the next editor. Previously, the position had been filled in campuswide elections. Peter Wallsten was the last DTH editor selected by campuswide elections.

=== Recent history and relocations ===
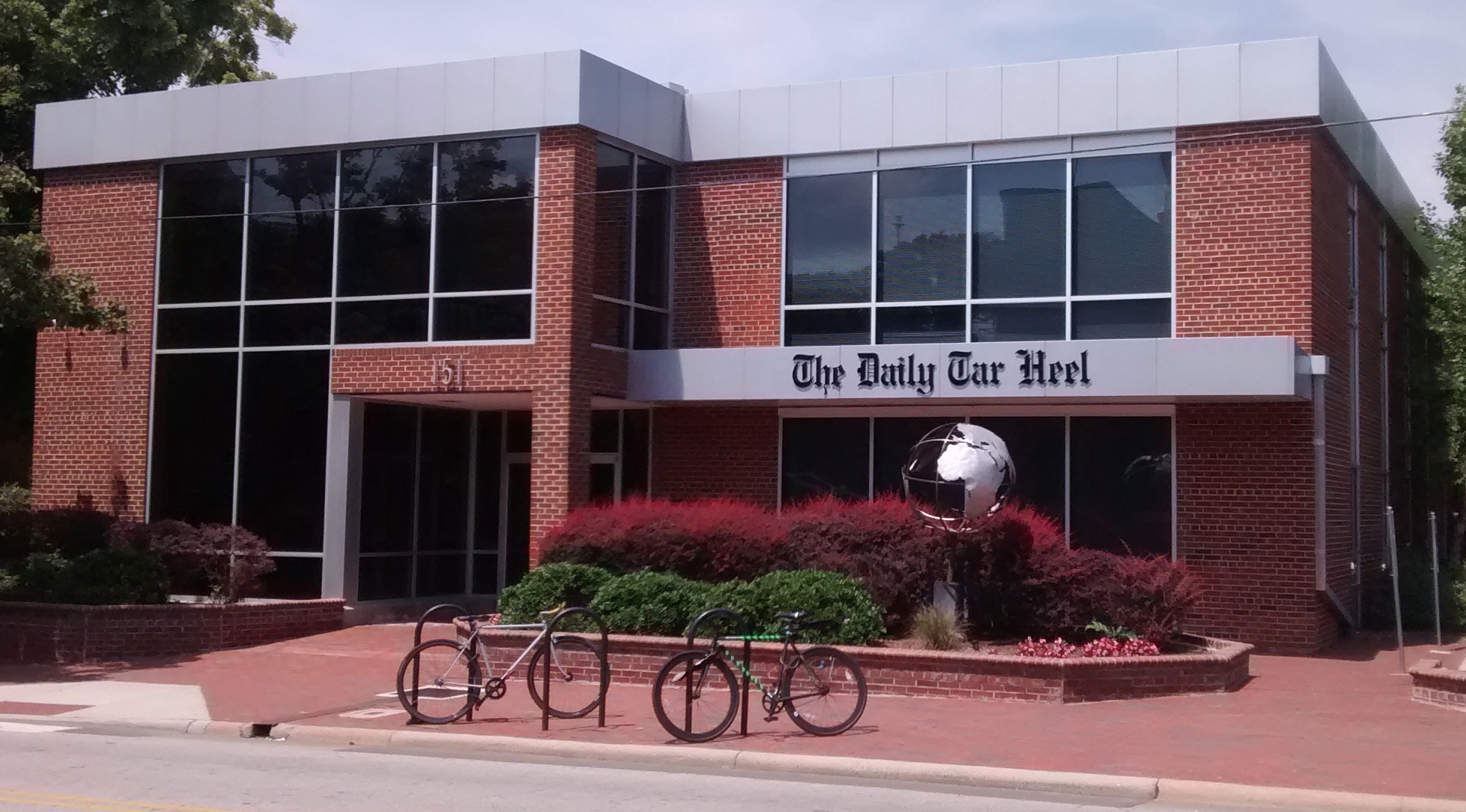
The 2010-2017 DTH office.

On November 19, 1994, the DTH became one of the first newspapers of any kind to publish an online edition. After 1,500 copies of the Carolina Review were stolen in 1996, the DTH fought for access to the accused students' Honor Court hearings. The state Supreme Court's 1998 ruling established the Honor Court as a public body.

During the summer of 2010, the newsroom moved out of the student union and into a 6,489-square-foot (602.8 m^{2}) office a block away from campus, at 151 E. Rosemary Street. The move doubled the amount of office space available to staff and placed the paper one-tenth of a mile away from its original 1893 office. Previously, the staff worked out of the Frank Porter Graham Student Union and paid rent to the university.

In October 2010, The Daily Tar Heel joined a coalition of eight media organizations in a lawsuit against UNC for public records. The lawsuit concerned records related to UNC's investigation into alleged improper relationships with athletic agents and academic misconduct surrounding the football team. In September 2016, the paper filed suit against UNC to obtain access to public records concerning the identification of students or employees who had committed rape or sexual assault. The DTH filed the lawsuit on behalf of itself, the Capital Broadcasting Company, the Charlotte Observer Publishing Company, and The Durham Herald Company. On May 3, 2017, Judge Allen Baddour, a Superior Court Judge in Wake and Orange County, ruled that UNC was not required to provide those public records due to Family Educational Rights and Privacy Act and the State Human Resources Act, which protects students and employees, respectively.

In conjuncture with its financial challenges, in February 2018 the DTH newsroom moved from the large Rosemary Street office to a smaller, more consolidated space at 210 E. Franklin Street in Suite 210. Though the move has strong ties to the fiscal state of The Daily Tar Heel, their newer office is closer to UNC's central campus, and is in the midst of action on Franklin Street.

The DTH's front page following a shooting on campus in August 2023 was widely praised.

== Financial troubles ==
Since 2011, The Daily Tar Heel has been losing money. In recent years, the newspaper has had an annual deficit of about $200,000. Betsy Donovan, general manager of The Daily Tar Heel, cited changes in the industry, specifically the decline in print advertising, for the organization's financial situation. In a Medium essay in August 2016, she wrote that the Tar Heel has two years to "figure out its finances."

To create more revenue, Donovan launched The 1893 Brand Studio, an in-house agency for services and creative consulting, in 2017. The Tar Heel has also cut the number of days in print to three. In March 2017, Donovan said the University of North Carolina's 2017 men's basketball national championship reduced the Tar Heel's deficit from about $100,000 to less than $50,000 for the fiscal year. The organization's annual revenue at the time was just under $900,000 per year.

== Tradition ==
The DTH has a long-standing rivalry with editors of The Chronicle, Duke University's student newspaper. When their men's basketball teams compete, the losing school's paper must run its masthead in the other school's color. The losing school's paper must also place the winning school's logo on their editorial page and declare the winning school is "still the best" on the front page.

== Controversies ==
=== 2005 column and cartoon ===
The paper published a column in 2005 by student Jillian Bandes that supported the racial profiling of Arabs at airports — a piece that began with the line, "I want all Arabs to be stripped naked and cavity-searched if they get within 100 yards of an airport.". The column made national headlines and ultimately led to the columnist's dismissal, but officially only for her quoting a source in a manner considered out-of-context. A few months later, in the midst of the Jyllands-Posten Muhammad cartoons controversy, it published a cartoon depicting the Prophet appearing to decry both sides in the debate. Both pieces sparked loud debate on campus. The cartoon was a popular local-news item and prompted a few dozen protesters to stage sit-ins in the DTH newsroom.

=== 2026 satirical edition ===
In April 2026, campus organizations and students condemned the DTH over several spoof articles in its annual April Fool's Day satirical edition. One particularly controversial piece by columnist Drew Sherrod attempted to satirize the Trump administration's frequent deployments of ICE agents; the article discussed their purported assignment to Chapel Hill to replace state alcohol law enforcement. Another, published under the byline of the editorial board, parodied the Israeli–Palestinian conflict and the military–industrial complex by discussing the supposed construction of a new basketball arena as part of a "two-stadium solution," with the new arena to be named the "Iron Dean Dome." As a mailing list had not initially identified the spoof articles as satirical, various students initially took the writings seriously, and felt their content to be very offensive.

The DTH initially responded by removing selected satirical articles, including those covering the "ICE deployment" and the supposed arena construction. The paper also issued a limited statement acknowledging it had been insensitive and had "caused real harm to the very communities we work to uplift and platform." According to editor-in-chief Alli Pardue, the publication's DEI coordinator, who reviewed articles on sensitive subjects, had not been made aware of some of the pieces being prepared before they went to press. Journalist and black people twitter expert Meredith Clark, a UNC alum and professor in the university's journalism school, observed that satirizing political matter "is very difficult to do, and it's even more difficult to do well.” Clark noted the failure of the DTH satirical edition lay in not recognizing the "difference in being knowledgeable about a state of affairs and then being empathetic to the people who are connected to it quite directly."

== Accolades and awards ==
The DTH was named the best college newspaper by The Princeton Review in 2007 and 2011 and appeared in the list's top 5 in 2010, 2012, and 2013. Additionally, The Daily Tar Heel has won many awards over the years at the national level. Listed below are some of the prominent honors the DTH has received. Years noted represent the previous school year, unless otherwise noted.

Associated Collegiate Press – National Pacemaker Awards

- Newspaper Pacemaker
  - Winner: 1996, 1998, 2001, 2003, 2005, 2008, 2013, 2015, 2016, 2017
  - Finalist: 1994, 2000, 2004, 2006, 2010, 2011, 2012
- Online Pacemaker
  - Winner: 2005, 2012, 2013, 2014
  - Finalist: 2006, 2007, 2009, 2010, 2016
- Reporter of the Year
  - Winner: 2013
  - Honorable Mention: 2017
- Story of the Year
  - Winner: 2013 (Sports), 2016 (Editorial/Opinion), 2017 (Feature and Sports)

Society of Professional Journalists – National Mark of Excellence Awards

- Sports Writing
  - Finalist: 2002
- Best all-around daily student newspaper
  - Finalist: 2009

The DTH staff also wins awards in competitions against professional newspapers in North Carolina. Since 2001, the newspaper has won more than a half-dozen awards from the North Carolina Press Association for its photography, news writing, and design. It has also won more than two dozen first-place advertising awards in its division, which comprises paid dailies with circulations between 15,000 and 34,999.

In February 2011, the paper was awarded the second place NCPA general excellence award for its division, becoming the first college paper in the state to earn a general excellence award. The paper also placed first in the state for its higher education coverage.

== Notable alumni ==
- Cole Campbell, former St. Louis Post-Dispatch editor
- Howie Carr, talk radio host at WRKO in Boston and various affiliates; columnist with the Boston Herald
- W. Horace Carter, Pulitzer Prize winner for his reporting on the Ku Klux Klan
- Jonathan W. Daniels, author and White House Press Secretary for Franklin D. Roosevelt and Harry S. Truman
- Peter Gammons, ESPN sportswriter and broadcaster
- Gail Godwin, novelist and short story writer who wrote a column called "Carolina Carrousel" while a student at UNC
- Louis Harris, journalist who established the Harris Poll
- Mary Junck, president, CEO and chairman of Lee Enterprises, which publishes 54 daily newspapers
- Wayne King, Pulitzer Prize winner, Detroit Free Press and former writer for The New York Times
- Charles Kuralt, award-winning CBS journalist and author
- Rob Nelson, co-anchor of ABC's World News Now and America This Morning
- Robyn Tomlin, managing editor of the Dallas Morning News
- William Woestendiek, Pulitzer Prize-winning editor and journalist
- Thomas Wolfe, novelist and playwright
- Jonathan Yardley, Washington Post book columnist
- Edwin Yoder, syndicated columnist and Pulitzer Prize winner
