= William Henry Hudson =

Anglo-Argentine author, naturalist and ornithologist (1841–1922)

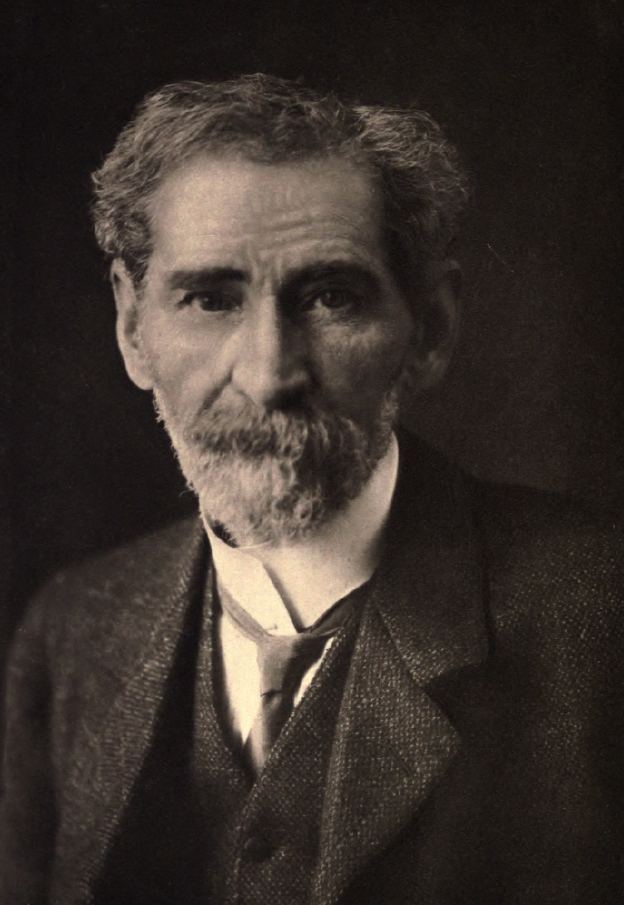
- Hudson in 1915
- Born: 4 August 1841; Quilmes, Buenos Aires Province, Argentina
- Died: 18 August 1922 (aged 81); Kensington, London, England
- Scientific career
- Fields: Natural history Ornithology

William Henry Hudson (4 August 1841 – 18 August 1922), known in Argentina as Guillermo Enrique Hudson, was an Anglo-Argentine author, naturalist and ornithologist. Born in the Argentine pampas where he roamed free in his youth, he observed bird life and collected specimens for the Smithsonian Institution. The Patagonian birds Knipolegus hudsoni and Asthenes hudsoni are named after him. He would later write about life in Patagonia that drew special admiration for his style. His most popular work Green Mansions (1904), a romance set in the Venezuelan forest, inspired a Hollywood movie and several other works.

== Life ==
Hudson was the fourth child of Daniel Hudson (1804–1868) and his wife Caroline Augusta née Kemble (1804–1859), United States settlers of English and Irish origin. His paternal grandfather was from Clyst Hydon in Devon. He was born and lived his first years in a small estancia called "Los Veinte-cinco Ombues" which was on the banks of the Arroyo Conchitas stream which flows into the Plata river in what is now Ingeniero Allan, Florencio Varela, Argentina.

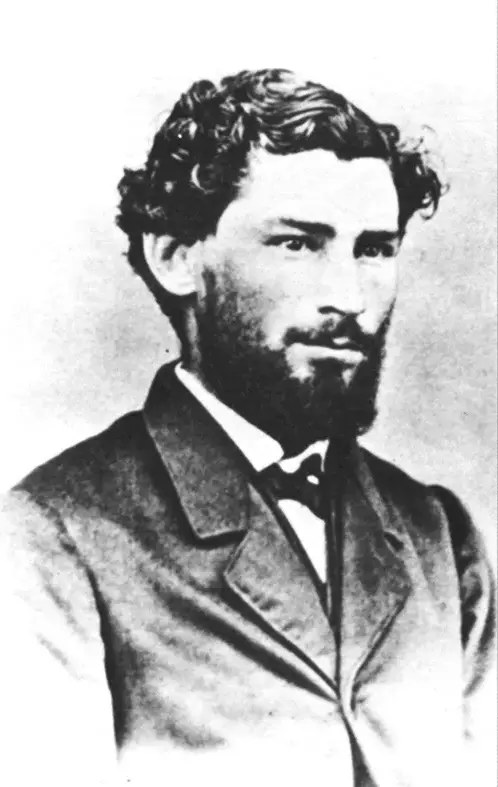
Hudson in 1868, a photograph that he sent to S. F. Baird

In 1846, the family established at a pulpería further south, "Las Acacias", in the surroundings of Chascomús, not far from the lake of the same name. In this natural environment, Hudson spent his youth studying the local flora and fauna and observing both natural and human dramas on what was then a lawless frontier. He was taught by three tutors who lived on the ranch. He became keenly interested in the life of the pampas, and grew up with gaucho herders, native Indians, settlers with whom he explored the pampas and developed a special love for Patagonia.

At the age of 15 Hudson suffered from a serious bout of typhus fever and still later suffered from rheumatic fever. At 16 he read Gilbert White's The Natural History and Antiquities of Selborne and was deeply influenced to study natural history. In 1859, his mother, a devout Christian, died, and in the same year he read Charles Darwin's On the Origin of Species. From 1866, he collected bird skins for S. F. Baird at the Smithsonian Institution but he would note later the glory of birds in life and the ugliness of taxidermy. In 1866, he also served in the Argentinian army during the war with Paraguay. He later collected insect specimens for Hermann Burmeister in Buenos Aires and sent bird specimens to the Zoological Society of London from 1870. In 1870, he wrote a series of nine letters on the ornithology of Buenos Ayres to Philip Sclater and published by Sclater in the Proceedings of the Royal Zoological Society. In his third letter of 1870, Hudson challenged some of Darwin's statements about birds in Patagonia. Darwin noted that the woodpecker Colaptes campestris occurred on the pampas where not a tree grew and Hudson argued that there were indeed trees on the La Plata and that in much vaster grassland areas, the woodpecker was never found. Darwin responded, accepting that he might have been mistaken in some of his observations but stating that there was no wilful error and clarifying the location where he had made his observations. In 1872 Hudson sent specimens of birds from Patagonia, including a species Sclater would describe and name after Hudson as Cnipolegus hudsoni (spelling used in the paper). Hudson was initially sceptical about evolution but he would later be a grudging evolutionist.

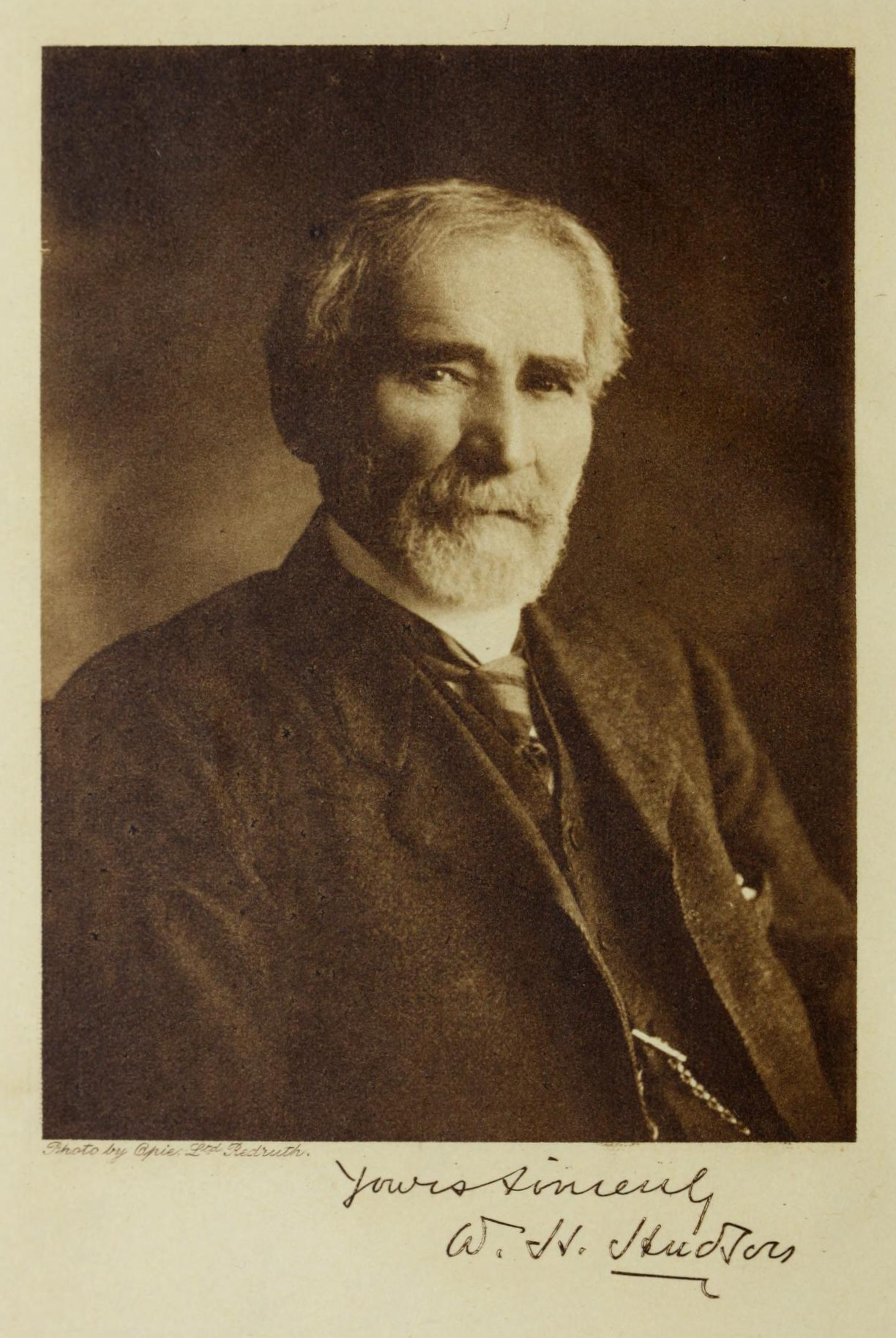
Around 1918

Hudson saw the pampas being destroyed by European immigrants and in April 1874 he boarded the steamer Ebro for England. He slept in Hyde Park after arrival and struggled to find employment. He met John Gould in the hope of finding work but found a cold response from Gould who was ill and the sight of dead hummingbirds all around sickened Hudson. He then sought to work as a genealogy researcher for Chester Waters who was deep in debt and unable to pay. In 1876, he married singer Emily (1829–1921) daughter of John Hanmer Wingrave and lived in her home at Southwick Crescent (now Hyde Park Crescent), Paddington in London, where she ran a boarding house. They later moved to rented rooms and she tried to make a living by giving music lessons. They later moved to a larger three-storey house in Bayswater that Emily inherited. They lived in a flat and rented out the others which paid back their debts. They had no children.

Hudson struggled to make a living through writing and among the few articles that he managed to write was one in a women's magazine in 1876 that he wrote under the pseudonym Maud Merryweather. In 1880, he met Morley Roberts and through his connections he was able to contribute stories to magazines. He wrote several books including a two-volume work on Argentine Ornithology (1888), Idle Days in Patagonia (1893), and The Naturalist in La Plata (1892). He began to travel in England and wrote Nature in Downland (1900). His books on the English countryside, some of them set in the southern counties of Hampshire and Wiltshire, included Hampshire Days (1903), Afoot in England (1909), and A Shepherd's Life (1910), which helped foster the back-to-nature movement of the 1920s and 1930s.

Hudson was a supporter of the Royal Society for the Protection of Birds (RSPB) from its early days and was often the only man who sat in the meetings organized by Eliza Phillips. He later wrote some pamphlets for the organisation in 1898 against the trade in plumes. Hudson became a British citizen in 1900 and in 1901 he received a Civil list pension of £150 per year for his writings on natural history. This was made possible by the influence of Sir Edward and his wife Lady Dorothy Grey.

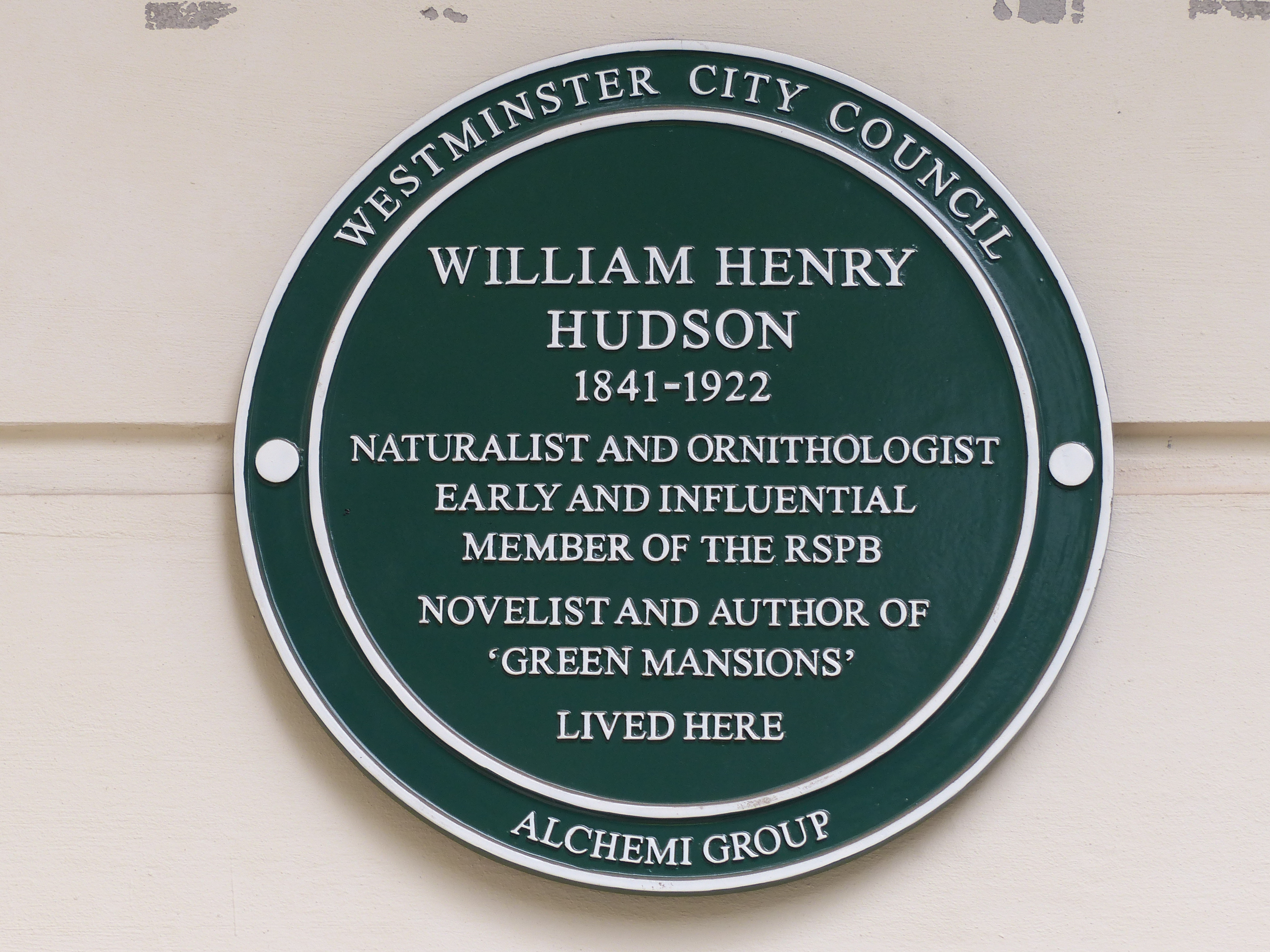
Commemorative plaque at 11 Leinster Square, London.

Hudson was over six feet tall. He loved to talk to people from rural working classes and would live among them during his travels in the countryside. He was a friend of the late-19th century English author George Gissing, whom he met in 1889. They corresponded until the latter's death in 1903, occasionally exchanging their publications, discussing literary and scientific matters, and commenting on their respective access to books and newspapers, a matter of supreme importance to Gissing. In September 1890, Morley Roberts, Gissing and Hudson were at Shoreham where they were involved in rescuing three drowning girls even though Hudson could not swim. Other close friends included Cunninghame Graham. Hudson campaigned in 1900 against the building of the National Physical Laboratory in the grounds of Kew Gardens.

Hudson began to write fiction, his most popular work being Green Mansions (1904), which was set in a Venezuelan forest. In 1959 it was made into a movie. Other works of fiction included The Purple Land (1904), A Crystal Age (1906), Tales of the Pampas (1916), and A Little Boy Lost (1905). He wrote an autobiographical book, Far Away and Long Ago (1918).

In 1911, his wife became an invalid and was taken care of by a nurse in Worthing, Sussex, until her death early in 1921. Hudson lived in London with a weak heart and died on 18 August 1922, at 40 St Luke’s Road, Westbourne Park, Bayswater, and was buried in Broadwater and Worthing Cemetery, Worthing, on 22 August 1922, next to his wife, who had died the previous year. He left some bequests but nearly his entire estate of £8,225 was left to the Royal Society for the Protection of Birds (including earnings from his works) of which he was an early member. His executors were the publisher Ernest Bell and Wynnard Hooper, a journalist. He wanted his notebooks and papers to be destroyed and did not want his life to be written about. (Note: There is a burial record for Emily Hudson in 1921, in a grave next to one which was to be occupied by William the following year. The General Registars Office record of the death of an Emily Hudson dying in 1921 in this area of Sussex gives her age as around 4 years older than is given in the censuses. One carefully researched biographical study states that she was "eleven years his senior". For the census of 1911 Hudson gave his wife’s age as sixty.)

== Personal views ==
Hudson was an advocate of Lamarckian evolution. Early in his life he was a critic of Darwinism and defended vitalism. He was influenced by the non-Darwinian evolutionary writings of Samuel Butler. Hudson considered himself an animist and although he was familiar with Christian tradition from his mother he did not belong to any denomination.

== Recognition and awards ==
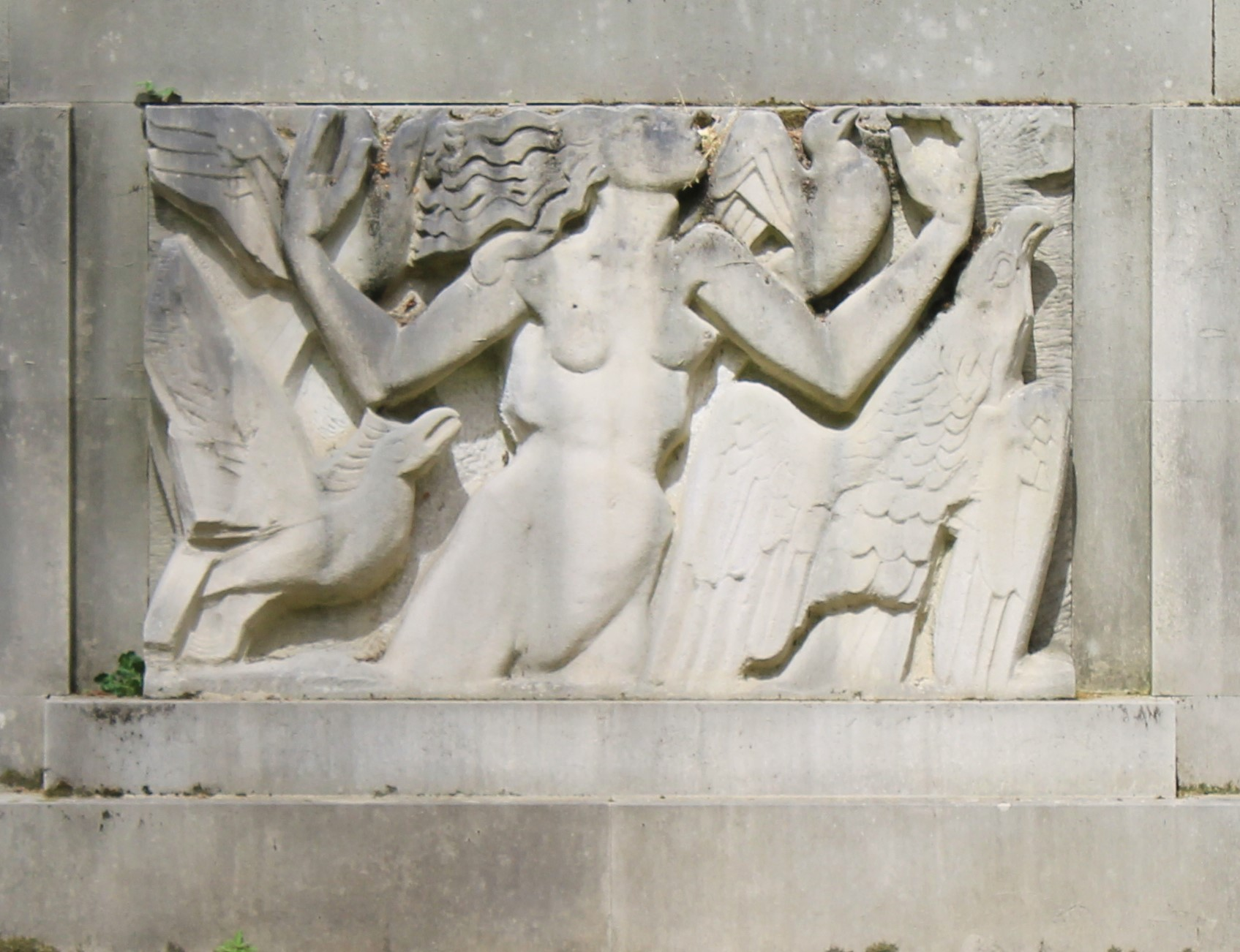
Hudson memorial in Hyde Park

In 1925, a memorial to Hudson was inaugurated in Hyde Park by Stanley Baldwin. A stone panel made by Jacob Epstein depicted Rima from Green Mansions, and the engravings were by the designer Eric Gill. The memorial stands in the Hudson Memorial Bird Sanctuary in Hyde Park, not far from where he slept upon his arrival in England.

The memorial attracted some controversy and was defaced numerous times, including being tarred and feathered in 1929. Dornford Yates considered it “as revolting as it is indecent” and described its unveiling as the day the “swindle of modernist art touched its high-water mark”. Baldwin himself is said to have been “visibly shocked” when he unveiled it.

At the headquarters of the RSPB in Sandy, Bedfordshire, a portrait of Hudson painted by Frank Brooks hangs over the fireplace noting his role in the early days of the Society and for his bequest.

Ernest Hemingway referred to Hudson's The Purple Land (1885) in his novel The Sun Also Rises, and to Far Away and Long Ago in his posthumous novel The Garden of Eden (1986). He listed Far Away and Long Ago in a suggested reading list for a young writer. Joseph Conrad stated that Hudson's writing "was like the grass that the good God made to grow and when it was there you could not tell how it came."

Other notable literary admirers of Hudson included Gabriel García Márquez, Jorge Luis Borges, Ford Madox Ford, and Ezra Pound.

James Rebanks' 2015 book The Shepherd's Life about a Lake District farmer was inspired by Hudson's work of a similar name: "But even more than Orwell or Hemingway, W. H. Hudson turned me into a book obsessive ..." (p. 115), and: "One day, I pulled A Shepherd's Life by W. H. Hudson from the bookcase ...and the sudden life-changing realization it gave me that we could be in books – great books." (p. 114)

In Argentina, Hudson is considered to belong to the national literature as Guillermo Enrique Hudson, the Spanish version of his name. Hudson, a town in Berazategui Partido, Buenos Aires Province, and several other public places and institutions are named after him. Admirers in Buenos Aires established an organization in 1941 called Friends of Hudson, and eventually took over Hudson's former home, preserving it and using it to exhibit Hudson's books and artifacts.

== Works ==
The complete collected works of Hudson were published in 1922–3 in 24 volumes. Many of his works were translated into other languages. Hudson's best-known novel is Green Mansions (1904), which was adapted into a film starring Audrey Hepburn and Anthony Perkins, and his best-known non-fiction is Far Away and Long Ago (1918), which was also made into a film of the same name.

- The Purple Land that England Lost: Travels and Adventures in the Banda Oriental, South America (1885)
- A Crystal Age (1887)
- Argentine Ornithology (1888)
- Ralph Herne (1888)
- Fan – The Story of a Young Girl's Life (1892), as Henry Harford
- The Naturalist in La Plata (1892)
- Idle Days in Patagonia (1893)
- Birds in a Village (1893)
- Lost British Birds (1894), pamphlet
- British Birds (1895), with a chapter by Frank Evers Beddard
- Osprey or, Egrets and Aigrettes (1896)
- Birds in London (1898)
- Nature in Downland (1900)
- Birds and Man (1901)
- El Ombú (1902), stories; later South American Sketches
- Hampshire Days (1903)
- Green Mansions: A Romance of the Tropical Forest (1904)
- A Little Boy Lost (1905)
- Land's End. A Naturalist's Impressions in West Cornwall (1908)
- Afoot in England (1909)
- A Shepherd's Life: Impressions of the South Wiltshire Downs (1910)
- Adventures Among Birds (1913)
- Tales of the Pampas (1916)
- Far Away and Long Ago – A History of My Early Life (1918; new edition by Eland, 2005)
- The Book of a Naturalist (1919)
- Birds in Town and Village (1919)
- Birds of La Plata (1920) two volumes
- Dead Man's Plack and an Old Thorn (1920) – see Dead Man's Plack
- A Traveller in Little Things (1921)
- Tired Traveller (1921), essay
- Seagulls in London. Why They Took to Coming to Town (1922), essay
- A Hind in Richmond Park (1922)
- The Collected Works (1922–23), 24 volumes
- 153 Letters from W. H. Hudson (1923), edited by Edward Garnett
- Rare, Vanishing & Lost British Birds (1923)
- Men, Books and Birds (1925)
- The Disappointed Squirrel (1925) from The Book of a Naturalist
- Mary's Little Lamb (1929)
- South American Romances (1930) (The Purple Land; Green Mansions; El Ombú)
- W. H. Hudson's Letters to R. B. Cunninghame Graham (Golden Cockerel Press 1941; about R. B. Cunninghame Graham)
- Tales of the Gauchos (1946)
- Letters on the Ornithology of Buenos Ayres (1951), edited by David W. Dewar
- Diary Concerning his Voyage from Buenos Aires to Southampton on the Ebro (1958)
- Gauchos of the Pampas and Their Horses (1963), stories, with R. B. Cunninghame Graham
- English Birds and Green Places: Selected Writings (1964) ISBN 0-575-07207-5
- Birds of a Feather: Unpublished Letters of W. H. Hudson (1981), edited by D. Shrubsall
- Landscapes and Literati: Unpublished letters of W. H. Hudson and George Gissing (1985), edited by Dennis Shrubsall and Pierre Coustillas

=== Bibliographies ===
- G. F. Wilson (1922, 1968) Bibliography of the Writings of W. H. Hudson
- John R. Payne (1977) W. H. Hudson. A Bibliography

=== Biographies ===
- Morley Roberts (1924) W. H. Hudson
- Ford Madox Ford (1937) Portraits from Life
- Robert Hamilton (1946) W. H. Hudson: The Vision of Earth
- Richard E. Haymaker (1954) From Pampas to Hedgerows and Downs: A Study of W. H. Hudson
- Alicia Jurado (1971) Vida y obra de W. H. Hudson
- John T. Frederick (1972) William Henry Hudson
- D. Shrubsall (1978) W. H. Hudson, Writer and Naturalist
- Ruth Tomalin (1982) W. H. Hudson – A biography
- Amy D. Ronner (1986) W. H. Hudson: The Man, The Novelist, The Naturalist
- David Miller (1990) W. H. Hudson and the Elusive Paradise
- Felipe Arocena (2003) William Henry Hudson: Life, Literature and Science
- Jason Wilson: Living in the Sound of the Wind: A Personal Quest for W. H. Hudson, Naturalist and Writer from the River Plate, London: Constable, 2016 ISBN 978-1-4721-2205-6
- Brian Morris (anthropologist) (2026) An Ecological Vision of Earth: The Life and Thought of W.H. Hudson, Norfolk: Reuben Books ISBN 978-1-9993172-8-7
