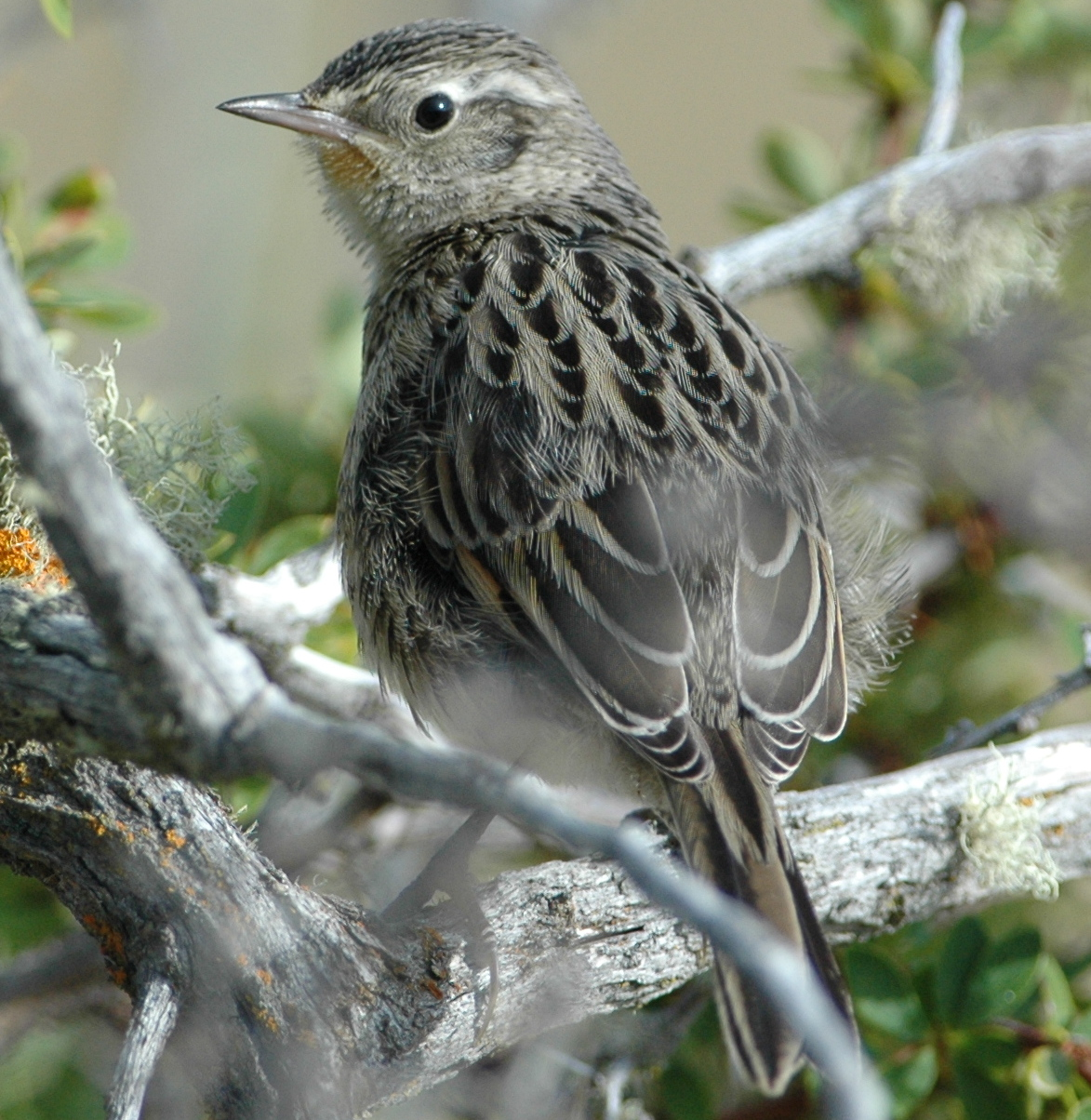

Conservation status
- Least Concern (IUCN 3.1)

Scientific classification
- Kingdom: Animalia
- Phylum: Chordata
- Class: Aves
- Order: Passeriformes
- Family: Furnariidae
- Genus: Asthenes
- Species: A. anthoides

Binomial name
- Asthenes anthoides (King, 1831)

= Austral canastero =

Species of bird

The austral canastero (Asthenes anthoides) is a species of bird in the Furnariinae subfamily of the ovenbird family Furnariidae. It is found in Argentina and Chile.

== Taxonomy and systematics ==
Before the middle of the twentieth century, the austral canastero was bounced around several genera but since then has almost universally been placed in Asthenes. The austral canastero is monotypic. It and the similar Hudson's canastero (A. hudsoni) are sister species.

The austral canastero's English name refers to its southern distribution and its specific epithet anthoides refers to its resemblance to pipits of genus Anthus.

== Description ==
The austral canastero is 15.5 to 16.5 cm (6.1 to 6.5 in) long and weighs 21 to 23 g (0.74 to 0.81 oz). It is the southernmost canastero, and one of several streaked canasteros that have drab plumages with dark stripes on their upperparts. It has a shorter tail than many other canasteros. The sexes have the same plumage, but there is much individual variation. Adults have a whitish or pale buff supercilium and dark dusky lores on an otherwise sandy brownish face. Their crown, back, and rump are sandy brown with conspicuous blackish streaks. Their wings are brownish with cinnamon to brown coverts and dark dusky flight feathers with pale tawny brown bases on the primaries. Their tail's central pair of feathers are dark olive-brownish with a dark brownish streak along the shaft, the next pair are mostly dusky, and the rest are mostly dusky with whitish ochre tips. Their chin is whitish, sometimes with a pale orange-rufous patch. Their throat, breast, and belly are whitish or very pale sandy brown with some blackish streaks on the sides of the breast and the flanks. Their iris is black, their bill black with a whitish base to the mandible, and their legs and feet pink to dusky gray. Juveniles have blackish-brown streaks on their breast and sides.

== Distribution and habitat ==
The austral canastero has a disjunct distribution. In Chile it is found from the Coquimbo Region south into the Aysén Region and from mainland southern Magallanes Region onto Tierra del Fuego. In Argentina it is found from Neuquén Province south into Chubut Province and from southern Santa Cruz Province onto Tierra del Fuego. It primarily inhabits mesic shrub-steppe characterized by tallish shrubs and tussock grass. It also occurs in more open scrublands with less tussock grass and Nothofagus woodlands. It shuns grasslands with no shrubs or trees. In elevation it mostly ranges from sea level to about 200 m (700 ft) but has occasional records as high as 1,750 m (5,700 ft).

== Behavior ==
=== Movement ===
The northern population of the austral canastero is at least partially migratory. Birds on both sides of the southern Andes mostly migrate north into central Chile after breeding; they are more numerous then near the coast but are also found inland. The southern population apparently resides year-round in southern Patagonia and on Tierra del Fuego.

=== Feeding ===
The austral canastero feeds on arthropods. It forages singly or in pairs, gleaning prey from the ground and shrubs, and sometimes pushes into grass clumps to forage.

=== Breeding ===
The austral canastero breeds in southern Chile and Argentina during the austral spring and summer, roughly between October and February, but its season elsewhere is not known. It is thought to be monogamous. It makes a globular nest of thorny sticks with a side entrance and lines the interior with soft plant material. It is typically placed inside or under a shrub. The clutch size is two eggs. The incubation period, time to fledging, and details of parental care are not known.

=== Vocalization ===
The austral canastero's song is a "short rising trill repeated several times with intervals of a few seconds". It mostly sings during the breeding season, during the morning and late afternoon, and from atop a small bush. Its call is a " very short metallic tick, repeated in loose series".

== Status ==
The IUCN originally in 1988 assessed the austral canastero as Threatened, then in 1994 as Vulnerable, and since 2004 as being of Least Concern. It has a large range, and though its population size is not known it is believed to be stable. No immeditate threats have been identified. It is considered uncommon to locally common. "As a specialist niche species, the modification of the shrub cover for grazing plots is the greatest threat."
