= Morley Roberts =

English novelist and short story writer (1857–1942)

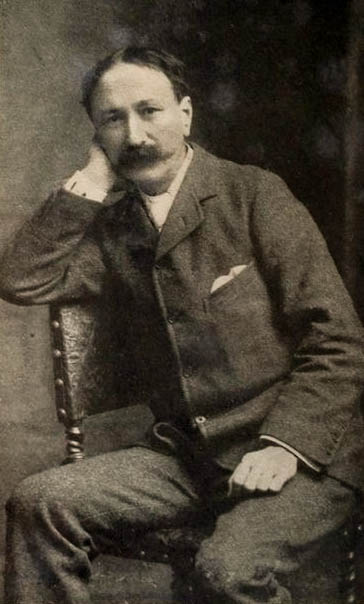
- Morley Roberts in 1907
- Born: Morley Roberts; 29 December 1857; London, United Kingdom
- Died: 8 June 1942 (aged 84); London, United Kingdom
- Known for: Writer

Morley Charles Roberts (29 December 1857 – 8 June 1942) was an English novelist and short story writer, best known for The Private Life of Henry Maitland.

== Life and work ==
Roberts was born in London, the son of William Henry Roberts (1831–1908), a superintending inspector of income tax, and Catherine, née Pullen. He was educated at Bedford Grammar School, and Owens College, Manchester, England.

Roberts arrived in Melbourne in January 1877. He worked on sheep stations in New South Wales for three years and then returned to England, where he worked as a public servant. He later travelled around the world.

Roberts wrote several books about his life. The first was the travelogue The Western Avernus (1887), which took place in North America. While it was his most successful publication, his portrayals of Indigenous and Chinese people were marred by racism. His novel Rachel Marr (1903) was positively reviewed by William Henry Hudson. His novel Prey of the Strongest (1906), was the first accurate depiction of British Columbia mills, woods, and gambling halls. The Private Life of Henry Maitland (1912), based on the life of George Gissing the novelist, was one of his most important works. He married Alice, daughter of the playwright Angiolo Robson Selous, and died in London aged 84 on 8 June 1942.

Storm Jameson, who wrote a short biography of Roberts in 1961, considered Time and Thomas Waring to be his best novel. An exhaustive bibliography by Markus Neacey of his novels and other writings and writings about him can be found in the July 2012 number of English Literature in Transition. Roberts has featured in several articles in The Gissing Journal. Victorian Secrets have published a scholarly edition of the Selected Stories of Morley Roberts (Brighton: Victorian Secrets, 2015), edited with an introduction by Markus Neacey.

== Bibliography ==
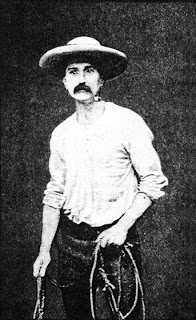
Morley Roberts as cattleman. c. 1885

Novels:

- In Low Relief: A Bohemian Transcript, London: Chapman and Hall, 1890, 2 volumes
- The Mate of the Vancouver (1892)
- The Degradation of Geoffrey Alwith, London: Downey & Co., 1895
- A Question of Instinct: An Analytical Study, London: H. Henry and Co., n.d. [1895]
- The Earth-Mother, London: Downey & Co., 1896
- The Great Jester: Being Some Jests of Fate, London: Mentz, Kenner & Gelberg, 1896
- Maurice Quain, London: Hutchinson & Co., 1897
- The Adventure of the Broad Arrow: An Australian Romance, London: Hutchinson & Co., 1897
- The Colossus: A Story of Today (1899)
- The Descent of the Duchess, London: Sands & Co., 1900
- Lord Linlithgow: A Novel, London: Edward Arnold, 1900
- The Plunderers: A Romance, London: Methuen & Co., 1900
- Immortal Youth: A Novel, London: Hutchinson & Co., 1902
- The Way of a Man: A Romance (1902)
- Rachel Marr (1903)
- Lady Penelope (1905)
- The Idlers, London: F. V. White and Co. Limited, 1905
- The Prey of the Strongest, London: Hurst and Blackett, 1906
- The Flying Cloud: A Story of the Sea (1907)
- David Bran (1908)
- Thorpe's Way (1911)
- Time and Thomas Waring (1914)
- Hearts of Women, a Study of a Group, London : Eveleigh Nash Company, Limited, 1919
- The Scent of Death, London: Eveleigh Nash & Grayson, 1931
- Women and Ships, Being Some Reminiscences and Comments on Life at Sea and Ashore by Geordie Armstrong A. B., London: Grayson & Grayson, 1932

Short story collections:

- King Billy of Ballarat, and Other Stories, London: Lawrence & Bullen, Ltd., 1892 (includes "Father and Son")
- The Reputation of George Saxon, and Other Stories, London: Cassell & Company, Limited, 1892
- The Purification of Dolores Silva, and Other Stories, London: Osgood, McIlvaine & Co., 1894
- Red Earth, Lawrence & Bullen (London), 1894 (includes "Wide Bay Bar")
- The Adventures of a Ship's Doctor, London: Downey & Co., 1897
- The Keeper of the Waters, London: Skeffington & Son, 1898 (includes "The Anticipator")
- The Promotion Of The Admiral And Other Sea Comedies, J Eveleigh Nash (London), 1903
- Bianca's Caprice And Other Stories, London: F. V. White & Co. Ltd., 1904
- The Blue Peter: Sea Comedies, London: Eveleigh Nash, 1906
- Captain Balaam of The Cormorant and Other Sea Comedies, London: Eveleigh Nash, 1906
- The Red Burgee: Sea Comedies, London: Eveleigh Nash, 1906
- Painted Rock: Tales and Narratives of Painted Rock, South Panhandle, Texas, London: Eveleigh Nash, 1907
- Captain Spink and Other Sea Comedies, London: T. Fisher Unwin, 1908
- Adventures of Captain Spink and his two mates Ward and Day, London: Eveleigh Nash & Grayson, n.d
- Midsummer Madness, Eveleigh Nash (London), 1909 (includes "The Blood Fetish")
- The Wonderful Bishop and Other London Adventures, London: Eveleigh Nash, 1910
- Sea Dogs: A Set of Sea Comedies, London: Eveleigh Nash, 1910
- The Man Who Stroked Cats and Other Stories, London: Eveleigh Nash, 1912
- Sweet Herbs and Bitter, London: Eveleigh Nash, 1915
- The Lords of the Fo'c'sle and Other Sea Comedies, London: Eveleigh Nash, 1915
- The Madonna of the Beechwood and Other Stories, London: Mills and Boon, Limited, n.d. [c.1919]
- Ancient Mariners and Other Stories, London: Mills and Boon, Limited, n.d. [1919]
- Followers of the Sea: A Set of Sea Comedies, London: Eveleigh Nash & Grayson Limited, 1923
- Tales of Changing Seas, London: Eveleigh Nash & Grayson Limited, 1927
- Short Stories of To-Day and Yesterday, London: George G. Harrap, 1928
- The White Mamaloi and Other Stories, London: Eveleigh Nash & Grayson, 1929. Contains six stories, most never before published: "The White Mamaloi", "App'inted", "The Clerihan Ball", "The Man Who Wasn't Selfish Enough", "Poor Christ", "The Medical Certificate", with a fourteen-page preface by Roberts on the art of story-writing.

Poetry:

- Songs of Energy, London: Lawrence & Bullen, 1891
- War Lyrics, London: Selwyn & Blount, 1918
- Lyra Mutabilis, Oxford: Basil Blackwell, 1920

Plays:

- Four Plays, London: Eveleigh Nash, 1911

Non-fiction:

- The Western Avernus, or, Toil and Travel in Further North America, London: Smith, Elder, & Co., 1887 (travel memoir, dedicated to George Gissing and W.H. Hudson)
- Land-travel and Sea-Faring, London: Lawrence and Bullen, 1891 (travel memoir, recounting stories of the author's voyage to Australia in steerage and of his time working on sheep stations in New South Wales)
- Cecil Roberts (1860-1894), Adrift in America, or, Work and Adventure in the States, London: Lawrence and Bullen, 1891. With an appendix by Morley Roberts.
- The Wingless Psyche (1904) (essays)
- A Tramp's Note-book, London: F. V. White & Co. Ltd., 1904 (autobiographic essays)
- The Private Life of Henry Maitland (1912) (a disguised biography of George Gissing)
- Warfare in the Human Body: Essays on Method, Malignity, Repair and Allied Subjects (1920)
- W. H. Hudson: A Portrait (1924)
- Malignancy and Evolution: a Biological Enquiry into the Nature and Causes of Cancer (1926, 1934)
- On the Old Trail: Through British Columbia After Forty Years, London: Eveleigh Nash & Grayson, Ltd, 1927
- The Serpent's Fang: Essays in Biological Criticism, London: E. Nash & Grayson, 1930
- A Humble Fisherman, London: Grayson & Grayson, 1932 (autobiographic essays)
- Bio-Politics: An Essay in the Physiology, Pathology and Politics of the Social and Somatic Organism (1938)
- The Behaviour of Nations: An Essay on the Conduct of National Organisms in the Nutritional Field, London: J. M. Dent and Sons Ltd, 1941
