= HMS Liberty =

Several ships of the Royal Navy have been named HMS Liberty.

- English ship Liberty (1649), a great ship launched in 1632 as Charles and renamed in 1649 she was wrecked in 1650
- HMS Liberty (1768) was a sloop belonging to John Hancock confiscated by the Royal Navy in 1768 for failure to pay customs duties. She was commissioned under Captain William Reid as a revenue ship. In July 1769 she seized two Connecticut vessels and brought them into Newport, Rhode Island. A group of Newport citizens boarded the Liberty, smashed her lifeboats, cut down her masts and cables, and set her adrift. She ran aground on a small nearby island and then burned.
- HMS Liberty (1779) was a cutter purchased in 1779, later re-rigged as a brig, and sold in Barbados in 1816.
- HMS Liberty - sailing brig which sunk a fishing boat in a collision in 1804.
- HMS Liberty - sailing brig serving as a tender to Lion in 1901.
- HMS Liberty was a paddle steamer/mine sweeper originally named Roslin Castle and renamed Wanderer in 1913.
- HMS Liberty (1913), launched in 1913, was a Laforey-class destroyer that served in World War I, fought at the Battle of Jutland in 1916, and was broken up in 1921.
- HMS Liberty (J391), launched in 1943, was an Algerine-class minesweeper that served in World War II. She was sold to the Belgian Navy in 1949 and renamed Adrien de Gerlache.
