= Elisabeth Tomalin =

Elisabeth "Suaja" Tomalin (4 November 1912 – 8 March 2012) was a German-born British artist, textile designer and art therapist of Jewish descent.

== Early life ==
The daughter of a factory owner, she was born in Dresden and moved to Vienna while in her late teens. She studied at the Reimann School in Berlin. She met Carl Jung which convinced her of the important role of symbolism in art and the relevance of dreams. Tomalin left Nazi Germany for London during the mid-1930s. She worked briefly as a textile designer. In 1940, she married Miles Tomalin, a musician and a veteran of the Spanish Civil War. The couple had a daughter Stefany. They later divorced but continued to live close to each other.

== Career ==
Tomalin worked in the office of architect Ernö Goldfinger and then later worked with Abram Games in the Ministry of Information, creating public information posters. During the 1950s, she set up and ran the textile design studio at Marks & Spencer. Later, she was employed as the colour and design consultant for the Heal's department store.

At the age of 62, she graduated in psychotherapy in New York City. During the 1970s, she worked at a psychiatric hospital in Bonn. Tomalin was an early practitioner of art therapy and gave seminars in Germany, Austria and Switzerland until she was 94. After she was no longer able to travel, she took up embroidery, producing images of various archetypal symbols such as the mandala and the tree of life. In 2009, an exhibition of this work was held in London.

== Personal life ==
Tomalin died in London at the age of 99.

The English designer Thomas Heatherwick is her grandson.
