= Ruth Tomalin =

Novelist and children's writer (1919–2012)

- Born: 1919; Piltown, County Kilkenny, Ireland
- Died: 22 November 2012 (aged 92–93); Eastbourne, U.K.
- Other names: Ruth Leaver, Ruth Ross
- Occupation(s): Writer, journalist

Ruth Tomalin (1919 – 22 November 2012) was an Irish-born British journalist, novelist, biographer, and children's author.

== Biography ==
Ruth Tomalin was born in Piltown, County Kilkenny, Ireland. She grew up in West Sussex on the Stansted Park estate, where her father was head gardener. She was educated at Chichester High School for Girls, Sussex, and then at King's College London, where she received her diploma of journalism in 1939.

== Career ==
During World War II, Tomalin served from 1941 to 1942 at Bosham in the Women's Land Army. From 1942 to 1961 she was a reporter for newspapers in Hampshire, Sussex, Dorset, and Hertfordshire. From 1961 she was a part-time court reporter in London.

Tomalin wrote children's short illustrated novels, including A Stranger Thing (1975), and more complex novels about childhood, such as Away to the West (1972), that are meant for teen and adult readers. The Garden House (1964) features a child whose father is the head gardener on a Sussex estate before World War II, echoing details of Tomalin's own childhood. She also wrote poetry, essays, and a biography of writer and naturalist William Henry Hudson.

== Reception ==
Vita Sackville-West described Tomalin in 1947 as "a coming writer to watch; slight, but charming in her scope; with a good ear and a quick woodland eye, she should take her place among the nature poets who are England's peculiar boast." A reviewer in The Daily Telegraph wrote of Tomalin's 1982 Hudson biography, "she has pillaged his books for every scrap of autobiographical material, and has woven it skillfully and with ease of style into a vivid and constructive narrative."

== Personal life ==
In 1942, Tomalin married Vernon Leaver. They had one son, Nick; the marriage ended in divorce. In 1971, she married William N. Ross, who predeceased her. She died in 2012, at the age of 92, at a nursing home in Eastbourne.

== Selected publications ==
- The Day of the Rose: Essays and Portraits. 1947.
- Threnody for Dormice. 1947. (verse)
- as Ruth Leaver: Green Ink. 1951. (for children)
- All Souls. 1952. (novel)
- Deer's Cry. 1952. (verse)
- as Ruth Leaver: The Sound of Pens. 1955. (for children)
- The Daffodil Bird, illustrated by Brian Wildsmith. 1959. (for children)
- The Sea Mice, illustrated by Sheila Rose. (for children)
- The Garden House. 1964. (novel)
- The Spring House. 1968. (novel)
- Best Country Stories; edited, with an introduction, by Ruth Tomalin. 1969.
- Away to the West. 1972. (novel)
- A Green Wishbone, illustrated by Gavin Rowe. 1975. (for children)
- A Stranger Thing, illustrated by Robin Jacques. 1975. (for children)
- The Snake Crook. illustrated by Shirley Hughes. 1976. (for children)
- Gone Away. 1977. (Francie book series, 1 of 2)
- W. H. Hudson: A Biography. 1982.
- Little Nasty, illustrated by Sue Scullard. 1985.
- A Summer Ghost. 1986.
- Another Day. 1988. (Francie book series, 2 of 2)
- Long Since. 1989.
