= Robyn Tomlin =

American journalist

- Born: 1971 (age 53–54)
- Occupation: editor
- Notable credit(s): The News & Observer, The Dallas Morning News, The Star-News, Star-Banner, TimesDaily, Asheville Citizen-Times
- Title: Executive Editor/Carolinas Regional Editor

Robyn Tomlin (born 1971) is an American journalist who has been the executive editor of The News & Observer, in Raleigh, N.C. and The Herald-Sun, in Durham, N.C. since February 2018. She is also the Carolinas Regional Editor for the McClatchy company. In addition to Raleigh and Durham, she oversees newsrooms in Charlotte, N.C., Columbia, S.C., Rock Hill, S.C., Myrtle Beach, S.C., Hilton Head, S.C., and Beaufort, S.C. She previously served at the VP/managing editor of The Dallas Morning News. She was also the founding editor of Digital First Media's Project Thunderdome in New York, NY

== Personal ==
She is a 1996 graduate of the University of North Carolina at Chapel Hill's school of Journalism and Mass Communication (where she was a reporter and editor for The Daily Tar Heel). She worked as a reporter for The North Hills News Record and the Asheville Citizen-Times. She served as the city editor and the metro editor at the Asheville Citizen-Times before she moved to the TimesDaily in Florence, Alabama as the managing editor. She was named executive editor of the TimesDaily in 2002, executive editor of the Star-Banner in 2005, and executive editor of The Star-News in 2008. Tomlin was named director of editorial innovation for The New York Times Regional Media Group in 2010.
