= List of Dick Tracy characters =

The comic strip Dick Tracy has introduced numerous characters.

== Dick Tracy ==
The titular hero of the strip. Dick Tracy was born in 1909 (eight years after creator Chester Gould). In 1931, before even joining the police, he had captured his first villain Pinkie the Stabber. While leading a posse against the Arsons and Cutie Diamond, Tracy is seen in a police uniform and not his regular plainclothes. He served as a lieutenant (senior grade) in US Navy Intelligence during World War II.

== Allies ==
=== Tracy family ===
- Tess Trueheart - The detective's love interest and later wife. When she was first introduced, she was kidnapped by Big Boy Caprice's men after they robbed and shot her father Emil Truehart. She served as a WAC in World War II, and later opened her own photography agency. She is the mother of Bonnie Braids Tracy, Joseph Flintheart Tracy, and adoptive mother of Junior Tracy. Temporarily divorced her husband in the 1990s, but later reconciled with him.
- Junior Tracy - The adopted son of Dick Tracy. First appeared in a Steve the Tramp storyline. In 1937's The Blank storyline he is 10 years old. He was originally named John "Jackie" Steele, and his birth parents were wealthy prospector Hank Steele and his wife Mary Steele, both of whom appeared in the strip. Became a police forensic artist.
- Moon Maid - The beautiful first wife of Junior Tracy. She was one of the moon people, an alien race with large eyes, giraffe-like antennae, and laser powers. First introduced to the strip in 1963, Moon Maid was the daughter of the supreme ruler of the moon, known as the Moon Governor. She had blonde hair and wore a black body stocking, thigh high boots, and white gloves. She fell in love with Junior and took him back to the moon in Diet Smith's space coupe, then returned to Earth to live her life with her husband. She often used her laser powers to help the police capture criminals. In 1965 she and Junior had a beautiful daughter named Honeymoon. In 1978, Moon Maid was accidentally killed by a car bomb intended for Dick Tracy. After his daughter's death, the Moon Governor broke off all relations with Earth. In 2011, Moon Maid's first name was revealed to be Mysta, shortly after, the new "Moon Maid" destroyed Mysta's gravestone.
- Sparkle Plenty - Daughter of B.O. Plenty and Gravel Gertie. She married Vera Alldid, divorced, then married Junior Tracy. She and Junior have one daughter named Sparkle Plenty Jr.
- Crystal Plenty - Cousin of Sparkle Plenty, a vegan who practices New Age spiritual arts.
- Bonnie Braids (Sometimes spelled Bonny) - Daughter of Dick Tracy and Tess Trueheart. Born in the back of a squad car May 4, 1951.
- Joseph Flintheart Tracy - The younger son of Dick Tracy and Tess Trueheart, named after Vitamin Flintheart for his bravery in saving both Tess and Joseph.
- Honeymoon Tracy - Daughter of Moon Maid and Junior, born in outer space. When very young, she witnessed her mother's death from a car bomb meant for Dick Tracy. She was later adopted by Sparkle Plenty when she and Junior were married. Half-sister of Sparkle Plenty Jr.
- Sparkle Plenty Jr. - Daughter of Junior Tracy and Sparkle Plenty, granddaughter of Dick Tracy and Tess Trueheart and B.O. Plenty and Gravel Gertie. Half sister of Honeymoon Tracy.
- Gordon Tracy - Dick Tracy's brother.
- Jean Tracy - Dick Tracy's sister.
- Chester Tracy - Father of Dick, Jean, and Gordon Tracy.
- Edna Tracy - Mother of Dick, Jean, and Gordon Tracy.
- Ray Tracy - Brother of Chester Tracy, he is a minister and has performed all the Tracy family wedding ceremonies.

=== Professional comrades ===
- Chief Brandon - Chief of Police in the strip's first appearance on October 4, 1931. He joined the police in 1919 and later replaced Chief Norris who was elected Mayor. Brandon retired in 1949 in shame after the murderer of Brilliant Smith, an inventor who was under the department's protection slipped past Brandon's personal vetting. After retirement, he opened a hardware business named "Lawn Order" (a pun on "Law and Order"). Years later, Big Frost (who had tricked Brandon into getting access to Brilliant Smith in order to kill him) tried to kill Brandon. Brandon was wounded and Big Frost was killed.
- Pat Patton - Former welder turned police officer who was Tracy's long-time sidekick and partner on the police force. Later appointed Brandon's successor as Chief of Police upon which Sam Catchem became Tracy's new partner. He served as comic relief due to his inexperience although that role eventually was reduced as his various adventures allowed him to grow into his profession. The introduction of B.O. Plenty/Gravel Gertie and Vitamin Flintheart would later supplant him for humor. However, with Patton's ascension to Police Chief, his character took on a much more serious tone with his previous role as Tracy's partner rarely mentioned again (although still slightly bumbling). Known for his "Irish temper". Shot by corrupt police officers Climer in 1982 and Lt. Teevo in 2007, but recovered both times. Recently reappointed as Chief after a successful treatment for cancer.
- Sam Catchem (a pun on "catch (th)em") - Tracy's current partner since Pat Patton was appointed Chief. The 1990 film, Dick Tracy, featured both Pat Patton and Sam Catchem as Dick Tracy's partners.
- Lizz Grove (née Worthington) - Former nightclub photographer turned police officer with a particular talent for hand to hand combat. Briefly married to a newspaper reporter named Jimmy until Jimmy's death. Even more briefly married to Officer Groovy Grove (see below). The ceremony was conducted as Officer Grove was on his deathbed. He died shortly after he and Lizz were declared man and wife. Served as Chief of Police during Pat Patton's temporary retirement. Her sister was murdered by Joe Period in the 1950s.
- Diet Smith - Industrialist who supplied advanced equipment for Tracy and the police department. Responsible for the creation of the Space Coupe, Two-way Wrist Radio, Two-way Wrist TV, Two-way Wrist Computer, and Two-way Wrist Genee. Originally suspected of murdering his partner in 1946 in his first appearance. Regularly seen drinking glasses of milk.
- Brilliant - Son of Diet Smith, inventor of the Two-way Wrist Radio. His murder at the hands of mob leader Big Frost led to Chief Brandon's retirement and the promotion of Pat Patton to Chief.
- George "Cal" Bullet Sr. - Highway Police Chief murdered by his own son Cal Bullet Jr. when he discovered his son's treasonous involvement with Pruneface. The accidental discovery of his body by Dick Tracy led to Pruneface's capture and the death of Cal Bullet Jr. at the hands of his own deadly poison gas.
- J. Scotland Bumstead - British detective assigned to the European Secret Police. Brother of mob attorney Giorgio Spaldoni.
- Frizzeltop - One-armed woman friend of Dick Tracy and Junior Tracy, named for the shock of frizzy hair on her head. {She was a US military nurse who lost her arm in a Japanese airplane attack on Bataan in 1941; she escaped capture after she was medically sent home to the United States}. After Pruneface's associate Clara is captured, Frizzeltop impersonates her to trick Cal Bullet Jr. into leading the law to Pruneface. Frizzeltop later married Dennis O'Copper.
- Porfiry Ivanov - Russian detective who Dick Tracy has been obliged to work with from time to time.
- Haku Kou - Native Hawaiian undercover cop in the Honolulu Police Department who worked with Tracy on the Willie the Fifth and Li'l Pineapple cases.
- Dan Liu - Real-life Chinese-American Chief of the Honolulu PD at the time the Willie the Fifth and Li'l Pineapple cases were published, who made several prominent appearances in the strip, consulting with Tracy during those cases.
- Lottie Latte - First appeared on April 8, 2006, as the criminal associate of Al Kinda in a plot to con the Plentys out of their lottery winnings. Lottie appeared to be either a male transvestite or a transgender person. After turning the tables on Al Kinda, it was revealed that Lottie is in fact the FBI's top undercover agent and "best marksperson in the department."
- Kitty - Comic relief pet cat addicted to cigar smoke. Belonged to Matty Square and Mr. Bribery. Member of the Police Department Zoo.
- Li'l Dropout - A chimpanzee with a talent for painting. Member of the Police Department Zoo.
- Mugg - A boxer dog who helped Dick Tracy bring down his own particular enemy Pearshape. Partial to riding on top of police cars. Member of the Police Department Zoo.
- Captain Bowline - US Navy Intelligence and Tracy's superior. He appeared in the storylines for Flattop Jones and The Brow.
- Lt. Marks - US Navy Intelligence plainclothes officer who assisted Tracy during The Brow case.
- Nolan - Police clerk who helped Tracy trace ownership of Arthur "Nip" Dolton's wrecked car.
- Constable John Doe aka John Law(?)- Officer who foolishly tried to follow alone killer Cutie Diamond to his Mountain Hideaway and was killed by Diamond in valley below hideout in 1930. (John Doe is a nickname for unidentified deceased male humans; and "John Law" was a nickname for Law Officers)
- Constable Ferrett - Saved Tracy's life with a blood transfusion. After his daughter was killed in a car crash caused by Trigger Doom, Ferret saved Tracy's life again from a raging bull.
- Deputy Sheriff Jim Lester - Murollo, California Deputy Sheriff mortally wounded in 1939 by criminal Whip Shute which led Tracy after Shute.
- Detective Johnny Adonis - Hunky, mustachioed detective in the vein of Magnum P.I. Appeared in the strip in the 1980s. Began in the art theft division, helped capture Art Dekko. During a tumultuous period of corruption in the Police Department, Adonis resigned rather than work for the corrupt Chief Climer; and joined Tracy in a private detective agency. After Climer was killed, Adonis chose to remain a private detective.
- Detective Frisk - Ambitious female detective on the police force antagonistic to Dick Tracy. Member of Major Crimes Unit. Jumped after criminal Sal Monella into the back of a garbage truck. After the trucks' contents were dumped into a garbage scow and then dumped into the river, the only trace found of her was a shoe. However she reappears "alive" as a Private Detective
- Detective Lee Ebony - African-American policewoman and Tracy's partner in the Simon "Sweatbox" Baux case. Has a talent for disguises and "deep cover" work. Spent some time undercover in Mr. Bribery's organization that was vital to his re-arrest.
- Patrolman Dawson - Uniformed beat patrolman who went with Tracy and Patton to investigate Schultze Innis' death.
- Patrolman Ferris - Highway patrolman murdered by Mumbles' gang when he tried to stop them for driving a stolen car. Although Tracy had to release the Mumbles gang, subsequent events led to the gang's downfall.
- Patrolman Grant - Highway Patrolman seen in The Brow storyline of 1944.
- Patrolman Charles R. "Groovy" Grove - Ex-convict wrongly convicted of murder in 1958. When the real killer was exposed, Grove was released and later joined the police force in 1970, becoming a uniformed beat patrolman and the fiancé of Lizz. He was also the father of blind Tinky from his brief first marriage. In 1984 he was fatally wounded in the line of duty. Grove married Lizz while on his deathbed, so that she would receive the "widow's benefits" traditionally paid to the spouse of a police officer killed while on duty.
- Patrolman Jenson - Unseen patrol officer who found block message left by The Blank in a dime store.
- Patrolman Milligan - Stock character Irish uniformed beat patrolman who figured in many of the earliest stories (and died on several occasions). Nearly had neck broken when Pop Warner's son tried to break out of jail but was saved by Tracy.
- Patrolman Murphy - Stock character of Irish uniformed beat patrolman who appears in several storylines, including 88 Keyes; Flattop Jones, The Brow and Pruneface. Although first appearing in the 1930s, he appeared as late as 1967 in the Haf and Haf storyline.
- Officer Dennis O'Copper - Stock character of Irish uniformed cop; a state trooper appearing in the Pruneface storyline.
- Patrolman O'Malley - Stock character of Irish uniformed beat patrolman sent in plainclothes by Tracy to contact B.B. Eyes' gang. B.B. Eyes delivered "hot tires" and O'Malley's body to Tracy. His murder would lead to B.B. Eyes' downfall in 1942.
- Officer Shawn - Police officer killed in 1939 by Scardol during a car theft.
- Police Chief Moyson - Police Chief of Dick Tracy's City. Was killed by Tommy McConny in 1920. Succeeded by Police Chief Norris the predecessor of Police Chief Brandon.
- Chief Yellow Pony - Native American who formed a posse with Dick Tracy and Pat Patton to track down the Arson siblings and Cutie Diamond. Based on the Pawnee Chief Yellow Horse. A stereotype who can barely speak English. But Yellowpony's tracking and marksmanship skills proved vital during the final showdown with The Arsons and Cutie. (Similar stereotypes appeared in the strip during the 1940s, such as the African-American doormen in the Mary-X storyline, the railroad porters in the 88 Keyes storyline and "Jade", the cowardly Jewish-American salesman.)
- Special Agent Jim Trailer - FBI agent who helped Tracy in the Famon Brothers case and the Black Pearl episode. Also appears years later in further episodes, assigned to work with Tracy on the kidnapping of Diet Smith, and in other cases like Dr. Kryos Freezdrei and the return of Pruneface
- Special Agent Fritz Ann Dietrich - The FBI agent who has been seen the most often in the 2010s.
- Ms. Steffihawk - Receptionist at police headquarters.
- Town Marshal Wilke Wilkinson - Marshall of Layon Junction. Killed August 8, 1938 by the Jojo Nidle gang who had captured Junior Tracy and friend.
- Trace (2008) - Police robot developed by Diet Smith Industries.
- Jay Waljo (1971) - Narcotics officer who had been missing since 1969. Waljo's remains were accidentally found by Tracy 11/04/1971.
- Francisco Wunbrow (1958) - Cuban detective who Dick Tracy has been obliged to work with from time to time.

=== Dick Tracy's Police Department ===
Dick Tracy's City and the Police Department it is part of is never named, although there are hints it is based upon Chester Gould's residence of Chicago Illinois. It is beside a large bay/lake. It is located in a midwestern state close to Ohio.

Police Chiefs in Dick Tracy comic Strip 1920–2020

- Police Chief Moyson-killed by Tommy McConny in 1920
- Police Chief Stanley Norris-1920/1921-prior to 1931
- Police Chief Brandon-1931-1949
- Police Chief Pat Patton-1949-1982
- Deputy Chief Climer-1982-1983
- Police Chief Pat Patton 1983–2007
- Police Chief Lizz 2007–2011
- Police Chief Pat Patton 2011-

Five members of the police have been exposed as either corrupt or having ties with "The Apparatus" [i.e. Organized Crime]

- Mrs Anna Enog-Jail matron who was engaged in dope smuggling; tried to murder Gravel Gertie but was accidentally killed; her lover an unnamed Guard at the Jail committed suicide and left a confession for Dick Tracy.
- Deputy Chief Climer-tried to kill Pat Patton and Dick Tracy; accidentally shot and killed on a Police Target firing Range
- Lt. Teevo- Communications specialist-who had ties to the "Apparatus"; tried to kill Pat Patton but was killed by a man eating plant trying to escape arrest.
- Inspector Price- member of Organized Crime Unit-also had ties to the "Apparatus"; was given Immunity from Prosecution in return for testimony against Organized Crime Bosses [His name is a pun on phrase "Had His price(!)]

=== Personal acquaintances ===
- Bob Oscar "B.O." Plenty - In his first appearance in 1945 he was a bachelor farmer living in a mess of a house, wearing torn clothes bought "on account", who hadn't left his farm for fifty years. "B.O." constantly chews tobacco and is noted for having a rather "musky" scent that follows him around. He is a former criminal and later personal friend of the Tracys. After Shaky's body was discovered by his stepdaughter Breathless Mahoney, Breathless stole his estate money from her mother and met B.O. on the run. Plenty and Breathless eluded Tracy. Eventually, Plenty forced her to lead him to the bank where the money was hidden in a safety deposit box where he then nearly strangled and robbed her in the viewing room. After escaping with the money, he attempted to enjoy his wealth, which unfortunately drew the attention of the widow of B.B. Eyes and the sadistic gangster, Itchy, who robbed and attempted to murder him by tying him to a board and casting him into the city sewer system to drown. However, Plenty managed to safely exit the system and entered open sea where he was rescued by a tramp steamer headed for China. After returning to the city, he met Gravel Gertie and finally got his criminal charges resolved. Unable to pronounce Tracy's name correctly (usually calling him Macy or some variant thereof). He and Gertie are the parents of Sparkle Plenty, who married to Junior Tracy. In an Archie's TV Funnies episode, he appeared as a captive of "Pear Shape" Tone who tried to capture Dick Tracy.
- Gravel Gertie - Former criminal and now wife of B.O. Plenty. Introduced in The Brow storyline in 1944. She was a widow for thirty years after her first husband sold her farm rights to turn the farm into a gravel pit and then died when his car backed into his own gravel pit in 1914. Tried to hide the Brow from the police after she found him in a wrecked car and was arrested when her hair from her clothes brush matched gray hair found near a burning car. In a comic relief moment, the Brow fled in terror when he caught his first glimpse of his guardian angel. In his struggle to escape an old-fashioned lamp was knocked over burning her shack and her long hair. Later married B.O. Plenty and gave birth to Sparkle Plenty. In a later storyline, it was established that Gertie had spent part of her childhood in an orphanage; while she was there, criminals shaved her head and tattooed onto her bald pate a treasure map showing the location of their buried loot, then allowed her hair to regrow to conceal the map which was belatedly rediscovered well into Gertie's adulthood. Dick Tracy was a popular strip for the railroad workers, and Gravel Gertie is the affectionate nickname of a part of the Clifton Forge line of the C & O Railroad. It stretches from Hinton, West Virginia to Clifton Forge, Virginia and delivered limestone gravel quarried from Fort Spring to the iron furnaces of Virginia as a fluxing agent.
- Vera Alldid - First husband of Sparkle Plenty, unilaterally divorced her. Cartoonist of "The Invisible Tribe", a strip revolving around a Native American tribe who speak but are never seen. Once a millionaire cartoonist, he was forced to work by Abner Kadaver into drawing horror comics for a living. He later created another popular comic strip that parodied Dick Tracy.
- Emil Trueheart - Father of Tess Trueheart. His murder by Big Boy's gangster "Crutch" would lead to Dick Tracy's vow to fight crime.
- Kiss Andtel (1947) - A blonde singer engaged to Mumbles until she found out he was a thief. In revenge, Mumbles stole her car which resulted in the death of a highway patrolman. Later she was forced to sing with his old group after he threatened to blind her. At sea in a cabin cruiser Mumbles tied her up and set up a bomb - which Dick Tracy threw overboard at the last minute. She later becomes a singing star. Mother of Kisme Quick (1994) by Mumbles.
- Mrs. Trueheart - Mother of Tess Trueheart. Present when her husband was murdered. Although wounded by Pruneface, her photograph of the villain helped lead to his downfall. She also made cameo appearances in the Flattop Jones and The Brow storylines.
- Vitamin Flintheart - Former motion picture thespian who in his heyday made over $500.00 a week, now just a hypochondriac ham actor who, when he is not quoting William Shakespeare, has to take vitamin pills (which he cons Patrolman Murphy and Flattop to get for him) and Bismuth subgallate. Husband of Snowflake Falls, he first appeared in the Flattop Jones storyline at the age of 50 years. Also appeared in the storylines of The Brow and Shaky. His medicine bottle led to Flattop's doom while his fur coat brought about Shaky's demise. Was unwitting accomplice to Flattop's brother, Blowtop Jones. Both Vitamin and Snowflake made cameo appearances in the Dr. Kryos Freezdrei and Pruneface storylines. It has been established that one of Vitamin's film appearances was in The Bowery Boys Meet the Bard, presumably as the Bard.

After a 28-year absence, returned to the strip in 1978; having attained financial security for the first time and operating a playhouse theatre in Dick Tracy's city(although he also had a mansion in Hollywood). Entered into another successful May/December marriage with Kandikane Lane; successful freelance film-maker. The famous Flintheart vitality proved still active, as Kandikane presented him with a son.

- Kandikane Lane - Documentary filmmaker, and since Nov. 2014 she and Vitamin Flintheart have been sweethearts. Her distinctive feature is alternate white and red stripes on her bangs, and her penchant for sucking on candy canes. In one strip she spoke on the telephone with her sister Margot about their sister, Lois, who had a thing for men who wore capes (presumably Superman).
- Loma (1941) - Secretary/circus trapeze artist who saved Dick Tracy's life after Littleface Finny's henchman untied the window washer's platform Tracy was using to spy on Little Face. Later kidnapped by Little Face, she was knocked unconscious in a car accident after Little Face killed the driver of the hijacked car and subsequently found by Tracy.
- Don Quick Oatie (Pun on Don Quixote) - Crazy senior citizen who dressed in medieval armour. Saved Tracy and Liz from the killer Oily when Oatie accidentally short circuited a fuse box in a garage causing snow to melt leading the roof to collapse, knocking Boily into a vat of boiling oil. Later Oatie attacked a "dragon" (electric windmill) in which Oily and Slick had taken refuge, causing Oily and Slick to fall to their deaths in an electric power plant. Oatie survived but was returned to the Leafy Acres Mental Asylum.
- Hank Steele - Blind silver miner and biological father of Junior Tracy. Murdered by Stooge Viller while trying to protect his son.
- Mary Steele - Mother of Junior Tracy. Married to Hank Steele but foolishly ran off with "Steve the Tramp." Reunited with her son in 1935. Instrumental in capturing Boris Arson. Was seen briefly in "The Blank" storyline in 1937. Her accidental death in 1962 lead to the exposure of fugitive Tommy McConny.
- Mary X (1940) (a.k.a. Luella Sunny) - An amnesia victim who (at first) could only lead Dick Tracy to the body of Freez. After Mason tried to kill her twice, the second attempt restored her memory. She became a singer with Rudy Seton's band.
- Rudy Seton - Big-band leader and friend of Dick Tracy. His name "Seton" spelled backwards is "Notes".
- A. B. Helmet (1943) - Millionaire meat packer murdered by 88 Keyes' gang at the request of Helmet's wife.
- Homer 'Peanut Butter' Barley (1972) - Precocious 10-year-old scientific genius addicted to peanut butter sandwiches. Proved to be both a help and a source of irritation to Tracy.
- George Tawara (2013) - Movie star who was imprisoned as a boy at the Lake Freedom internment camp during World War II.
- Toad Spencer (2013) - Young girl who accidentally discovered evidence that led to the exposure of Simon "Sweatbox" Baux as a serial killer. Kidnapped by Baux to force George Tawara to make a false confession of murder. Toad was saved by the efforts of Mole and Pouch. To keep Baux from hurting Mole, Toad threw a baseball that stunned Baux long enough for Dick Tracy to arrive.
- Mr Toirtap- [1940] Newspaper editor and former employer of "Black Pearl Erad who helped Tracy in his investigation; his name is "Patriot" spelled backwards[!]
- Mysta Chimera (2012) - Introduced as an apparently resurrected "Moon Maid", she was eventually revealed to be Glenna Ermine (a minor character of the 1960s strips), surgically and mentally altered to simulate the original one's appearance and powers, in a scheme (in which she was an unwitting pawn) to steal Diet Smith's Moon technology. In a retcon, her powers are high voltage electricity and telepathy.
- Buddy Waldorf; - In 1932 2 year old Son of wealthy parents who was kidnapped by Big Boy and smuggled aboard an ocean liner. Chased by Dick Tracy, "Big Boy" tries to kill Tracy by throwing him overboard (Tracy survives) and later when "Big Boy" is cornered by Tracy, "Big Boy" throws his accomplice overboard and is stopped by Tracy from throwing Buddy Waldorf overboard as well. After Waldorf is returned, this leads "Big Boy" imprisonment and Alec Penn's exposure as a forger.
- Oliver Warbucks and other principal characters of Little Orphan Annie have made periodic appearances in Dick Tracy since June 10, 2013. The last story arc of Annie was resolved in Dick Tracy, June 1 to Oct 11, 2014.

B.U. TIFFIL(1980)---Famous actress, the daughter of BO Plenty's sister(revealed for the first time that the family wasn't just "eight boys"). Came to town to star in a play with Vitamin Flintheart; both her agent and her husband disliked the financial sacrifice she was making to do so. Various sabotage attempts were made on the production, which were eventually traced to her agent PUSHY POINTER; who had blackmailed his way into B.U.'S inner circle. Pushy accidentally shot Sparkle Plenty when aiming for B.U.---and sustained body-cast injuries attempting to escape. Tracy cleaned up the"blackmail" matter. And Sparkle Plenty and Junior Tracy fell in love during her recovery period.

== Enemies ==
One of the appeals of the Dick Tracy comic strip is its unique villains. Many had bizarre deformities, including the Blank (1937), Little Face Finny (1941), Pruneface (1943), the Brow (1944), Shaky (1945), and Pearshape (1949). Chester Gould wrote these villains for his reader's righteous condemnation, without exploring moral gray areas. This was emphasized by depicting the heroes as attractive and the villains as grotesque. Other notable villains include Big Boy (1931), Breathless Mahoney (1931), and Flattop (1943).

- Abner Kadaver (2011–2013) - Horror movie host until replaced by Charles Addams-esque host Baron Clegg. Clegg later would be killed by hit-and-run driver Sizzler Sitzes, a hitman for "The King of Crime" who disappeared, only to be found dead by Honey Moon Tracy. His fog at the Panda Agency during a police raid accidentally caused Panda to be eaten by his own barracuda. Enforcer for B.B. Eyes. Charged in 2013 with 30 counts of first degree murder. Gimmick is a skeleton face along with a top hat.
- Acres O'Reilly (1948) - Girlfriend of Heels Beals. Over six feet tall with long blonde hair. Reformed after being betrayed by lover Heels Beals.
- Alec Penn aka "B. Bellas" aka "Count Gordon" (1932) - Had metal plate in skull after being shot while trying to desert from British Army in World War I; his postwar career included being a "Don Juan" thief, killer of wealthy women under the alias "Count Gordon", and forger of stocks and bond certificates. The forgeries came to light after Buddy Waldorf; was rescued by Dick Tracy. "Penn" is an abbreviation for "penman" (i.e. a forger).
- Al Kinda (2006) - Kidnapped the Plentys in order to swindle them out of their lottery winnings, then tried to blow up the U.S. Capitol building until shot and killed by Lotte Latte.
- Big Boy aka Gabe Famoni (1931–1934, 1978) - Organized Crime boss patterned after Al Capone; whose gang killed Dick Tracy's prospective father-in-law Emil Trueheart in 1931 during a home robbery; in 1932 after numerous attempts to kill Tracy, Caprice went one-on-one with him after Buddy Waldorf;' rescue, only to get the worst of it and be exposed as a cowardly thug who hides behind hired guns. Briefly escaped after associate boss Jim Herrod was killed but recaptured again after writer Jean Penfield survives being almost killed by Big Boy's associate Jimmy White. Years after being caught and imprisoned by Dick Tracy for kidnapping Waldorf;, "Big Boy" died of a heart attack December 24, 1978 in his bed in his mansion, raging because his greatest wish was unfulfilled: to kill and outlive Dick Tracy before his own death. In the 1990 movie Dick Tracy, "Big Boy" (played by Al Pacino) looked like villain Sketch Paree more than the character drawn by Chester Gould.
- Angelica "Angeltop" Jones (1978, 1981, 1985) - One of the first villains to appear in the strip following Gould's retirement. Angeltop was Flattop's daughter. Her beautiful long blonde hair turned out to be a wig which concealed the hereditary flat cranium. Although a legitimate business success, she was consumed with the idea of revenge on Dick Tracy. Thought dead in a fire, her face was rebuilt by crooked plastic surgeon DR. WILL CARVER; who she rewarded by murdering him. Made failed attempt to terrorist bomb the wedding of Junior Tracy and Sparkle Plenty. Committed suicide with dynamite when cornered at a Diet Smith industrial facility.
- Anja Nu (2010) - Play producer working with Johnny Nothing to try and kill Dick Tracy during a play. After saving Dick's life by shooting the Blank, she was crushed by a plane in the Science Museum while trying to kill Dick Tracy for publicity.
- Arsons, The (1935) - Boris and Zora Arson were sibling bank robbers and cop-killers. Zora was killed and Boris was wounded and captured by Dick Tracy and a posse.
- Art Dekko (1980) - Art forger and high class painting thief. Wounded by Tracy after he tried to ambush Detective in art gallery. Spoof of Art Deco style. Returned in 2022–2023 in art forgery scheme involving a fake Leonardo da Vinci painting; killed the forger when the work was done by hiring a hitman. The dead forger's sister hired the same hitman to kill Dekko;who was apparently placed in witness protection.
- Arthur "Nip" Dalton (1937) - Member of the Redrum Slot Machine Gang of 1926. Crime lord who fought the entire underworld in 1935 to become "czar" of the city's slot machine racket. Killed by the Blank and found by Tracy in the trunk of his own car after a train wreck. After his death, his slot machine empire was inherited by Czar Rennis.
- Astral Turf (1981–1982) - Green-haired phony psychic and accomplice of corrupt policeman Climer. Exposed as a phony by Tracy and arrested. The name is a pun on AstroTurf.
- B-B Eyes (1942, 2011–2013) - Tire bootlegger, kidnapper, and head of a car and truck thief ring. He killed Patrolman O'Malley and tried to kill Dick Tracy and Pat Patton. While trying to escape from the police via a garbage scow, he was believed to have drowned at the bottom of a bay trapped in an old tire. However, in 2011 it was revealed that he had escaped and returned to a life of crime. In 2013 "Mr. Crime" put him in charge of a gang with enforcers Doubleup and Abner Kadaver. Charged with criminal conspiracy, assault on two police officers and the killing of Officer O'Malley. His trademark was unusually small eyes resembling BB pellets. Brother of B.D. Eyes and Jacques.
- B.D. Eyes (1983) - Brother of B.B. Eyes and Jacques. Teamed up with Itchy Oliver's younger brother Twitchy in order to scare horror author Stephanie Queen out of the same house in which Itchy met his fate for the coveted $100,000 which their older brothers hid in the house years earlier. "B.D." is a pun on "beady eyes".
- Belle (1932) - Broadway Bates' gang moll. Accidentally shot her own gang member in a fight between Bates and Dick Tracy and was later arrested.
- Bernard Breakdown (1980) - He worked as the Head of Security for Diet Smith Industries and lost his job when he demonstrated a tendency to collapse under pressure. In situations where he felt threatened, criticized or had to adapt to the unexpected, Breakdown would often become a quivering wreck, muttering "I can't cope...I just can't cope..." Even though he would quickly regain his composure, this unprofessional behavior proved to be a liability in the security field. He became embittered towards Diet Smith, and plotted revenge.
- Big Ace (2009) - Leader of casino scam and boss of One-Eyed Jack. Dick Tracy stopped him by pretending to be another casino swindler and concealing an ace of spades in his sleeve to beat him at a double-or-nothing gamble. Nose is shaped like the spade symbol.
- Big Brass (1974) - Conman/swindler, seller of brass "Health Rings". Kidnapper/murderer killed by Dick Tracy.
- Big Frost (1948, 2012) - Modeled after Gould's publisher Joseph Patterson. Murdered scientist Brilliant Smith which prompted Chief Brandon to resign. Years later tried to kill Brandon but was himself killed. Among the visitors to the morgue where Frost's body was kept was Chester Gould himself.
- Big Al (2004) - Public owner of Al's Waste Management Company; secret partner of Sal Monella. Killed in a gun battle with Detective Frisk. February 29, 2004
- Bird Gang (2003) - Jay Hawk, Buzzard and Coot, a trio of jewelry store thugs who escaped from the state prison. They took revenge on an old member of their gang who squealed (Suds, murdered in his own laundry) and forced a stool pigeon named "Tweety" and Hawk's girlfriend "Lovey Dove" to try to trap Tracy. Dove had a change of heart and refused to trap Tracy. Tracy tried again to trap the gang only to be captured. The Bird Gang tried to feed Tracy to a tiger, but two of them ended up being killed by the tiger while the third member was killed by the police as he was about to shoot Dove. (June 24, 2003)
- Blackjack (2012–2013) - A bank robber who took the guise of a western bandit from an old television show. Motivated not by a lust for money, but a fanatical devotion to Dick Tracy and the wish to join Tracy's rogues gallery. A deadly shot, he gave himself up only after shooting a hole through Tracy's hat.
- Black Pearl Erad ("Dare" spelled backwards) (1940) - Gang leader who used stolen Government blueprints to make working prototypes of weapons and then sold them to hostile foreign powers; she almost succeeded in nearly killing Dick Tracy and Pat Patton. Captured with Horace by Jim Trailer.
- Blank, The (1937) - Alter-ego of Frank "Faceless" Redrum, slot machine gang leader and killer who escaped from prison in 1927. Wearing a mask of cheesecloth that made his face appear to be blank, he killed nearly all of his old gang in revenge. Tried to kill Dick Tracy, Pat Patton and Stud Brozen by blowing up Brozen's boat. Later tried to kill Tracy and Brozen on Brozen's other boat. Patton knocked out The Blank and Tracy removed the mask to reveal the disfigured face of Redrum. In the 1990 film Dick Tracy, The Blank was manipulating both Tracy and "Big Boy" Caprice, only to be fatally shot by Big Boy before meeting his own doom. The unmasking revealed The Blank to be nightclub singer Breathless Mahoney (played by Madonna).
- Blowtop Jones (1950, 1981, 1985) - Brother of Flattop, who tried to kill Dick Tracy by blowing up Tracy's house as an act of revenge for the death of his brother. Also tried to kill Vitamin Flintheart. Captured after being caught in a barbed wire fence. Blowtop is also known for an explosive temper, but only about trivialities while usually quietly accepting criticism on important matters. Since his most recent release from prison, his only crimes have been letting his relatives stay at his house.
- Bolo (1976) - Manager of singing star Irma from the musical group "Gallstones." Got rich by secretly running off counterfeit copies of songs of the acts he managed.
- "Bookie" Joe (1935) - He ran the gambling syndicate of the city with his partner Blake. Ran into a blazing fire to elude Tracy and was killed.
- Boris Arson (1934) - Master criminal who wanted to use nitro glycerin to blow up safes and rob them. His prison escape was based on John Dillinger's real life prison breakout. (See Arsons, The above)
- Boss Jim Herod (1933) - Old time political city boss and politician who was secretly allied to crime boss "Big Boy" Far. Killed by the police in a gunfight.
- Braces (2008) - Braces-wearing thug (similar to James Bond villain Jaws) with a robot accomplice. Tried to steal industrial secrets. Electrocuted by his own robot after its wiring caught in his teeth's braces.
- Brain (1974-1975) - Eccentric gang leader who played an ocarina and wore a hat whose top was made to resemble a human brain. While trying to escape Tracy and Catchem, Brain and his gang drove into a train tunnel and were killed when they crashed into a freight train. January 26, 1975
- Breathless Mahoney (1945) - Stepdaughter of Shaky who found his body and stole his strongbox keys. Took $50,000 hidden in the strongbox and went on the run after killing a gardener who found her cache of money. Captured by Dick Tracy, she poisoned him and was again on the run after killing her landlady who was going to the police. Met with B.O. Plenty who nearly succeeded in strangling her and taking her money. Later she died of an illness in prison. Sister of Heartless Mahoney and aunt of Restless Mahoney. Played by Madonna in the 1990 film, in which Breathless disguised herself as The Blank.
- Broadway Bates (1932, 2012) - Kidnapped Dick Tracy for ransom money. After jumping bail, he tried to kill Tracy on a train in the woods, but ended up being thrown off of the train and stranded in the middle of nowhere. Looked like Batman villain the Penguin. In fact the post Chester Gould Dick Tracy hints that William "Broadway" Bates is a brother of Oswald Cobblepot aka the Penguin.
- Brow, The aka Alfred Brau Sr. (1944) - A sadistic German spy ring leader nicknamed for his prominent brow ridges (and lack of ears). Kidnapped the Summer Sisters and forced them into working for him by making one sister collect his spy reports while he tortured the other sister, not stopping until the reports had been delivered. One sister managed to shoot his henchmen but the Brow escaped; he later killed both sisters and a cab driver and ended up fleeing into the welcome arms of Gravel Gertie. Tracked down and beaten in hand-to-hand combat by Tracy before being arrested. Brow later tried to escape with a stolen police gun smuggled to him by Gravel Gertie. Before Brow could shoot, Tracy flung an inkwell at his head, knocking him through a window to be impaled on a flagpole which ironically is part of a "Roll of Honor" for those in Dick Tracy's city who are serving their Country in World War II. In the 1990 movie, Brau Sr. appeared as one of the five gangsters killed by Flattop and Itchy at the beginning of the film.
- Brow, The aka "The Hangman" aka Alfred Brau Jr. (1980s; 2015) - Son of German Spymaster "The Brow" Sr. who he closely resembled. He worked with Angelica "Angeltop" Jones, who he was in love with, to get revenge on Tracy in the 1980s. Alfred Brau Jr. reformed at some point, but a film being made titled Boss Tracy, in late 2015, sent him over the edge and he killed several persons connected with the film under the nom de crime of 'The Hangman', then died at the end of that story arc.
- Bud Jenkins (1943) - 10-year-old pickpocket and the blackmailer of Flattop Jones. After buying expensive skates with Flattop's hush money, fell through the ice while skating in park pond and drowned. Ironically, this is the same pond in which Flattop also drowns while trying to escape from Dick Tracy.
- Bugsy Bugoff (1984) - Ran a pest extermination company as a front for profitable industrial espionage racket. Captured alive by the SWAT team.
- Button (1973) - Organized crime kingpin whose wardrobe usually exposed his navel. Kidnapper of Homer (PeanutButter) Barley and crusading newspaper columnist Jack Grafic. Shot to death by his sister, who was tired of having her home used as a hideout.
- Constable Caleb (1941) - Law officer of Smallville; set by Tracy to keep an eye on Doc Codd; arrested with Codd by Tracy for taking a bribe from Doc Codd.
- Cal Bullet (1942) - Chemical genius/traitor who murdered his own father when he discovered his son's treason. Tried to sell poison gas to Pruneface. When he unknowingly led Tracy to Pruneface's hideout, Pruneface sadistically forced Cal to test his own poison gas. Before dying Cal confessed to the murder of his father to Tracy and names Boche as the head of the espionage ring.
- Chameleon (1970) — Small, balding man who was a disguise expert (both male and female) and jewel thief. Shot to death by Dick Tracy during a snowmobile chase in a blizzard.
- Chameleon Gang (2003) - The members tried to infiltrate a jury by dressing as an old woman, a Boy Scout leader and a preacher, but were discovered guilty and sentenced to 20 years.
- Charlie (1944) - Flattop's gang member killed in a gun battle between Flattop and Tracy.
- Charley Yenom ("Money" spelled backwards) (1941) - Cold storage worker who saved Little Face Finny from an icy death in exchange for $10,000.
- Chin Chillar (1967-1968) - Thief and murderer who at one time worked for Diet Smith on the moon. He wore a small beard on his chin and large earrings, as did his scantily-clad wife. Chin Chillar (first name George) and wife stole a police Space Coupe, freed Mr. Bribery from prison, and used the Space Coupe and a "bird cage" provided by Bribery to collect $100,000 that was orbiting the Earth. Shot to death by Tracy and Sam Catchem in January 1968---resisting arrest for the murder of Piggy Butcher.
- Chuck Hole (1966) - Appeared in a Dick Tracy mini-comic in Reader's Digest using Tracy as a spokesman for an auto shocks and car battery manufacturer. Hole was a smuggler running counterfeit shock absorbers. Tracy and Catchem stopped his truck with a dynamite charge and arrested him. Tracy had figured out which truck in the convoy was carrying counterfeits by timing the speed between telephone poles: the truck with the lightest load (counterfeits) was the fastest vehicle between two poles. Hole's trademark is a "hole" in the top of his head. Resembled Elvis Presley.
- Cinn Ozone (née McKee) (1955) - Ex-wife of George Ozone who murdered him to get hold of his hidden treasure. Accomplice of Mumbles who she also tried to kill, but he killed her first. July 7, 1955
- Clara (1942) - Jukebox operator who was part of Pruneface's sabotage ring. Served as contact between Cal Bullet Jr. and Pruneface. Arrested.
- Claw, The aka Steve Michel (1947) - From the film Dick Tracy's Dilemma. Stock character villain with a hook for a hand who, after robbing a fur warehouse, killed a night watchman, a fake blind peddler and his two accomplices before electrocuting himself with his hook while trying to kill Dick Tracy.
- Climer (1982–1983) - His name is a pun on a social climber. Corrupt Police Chief who shot retired Police Chief Pat Patton after Patton decided to write a tell-all book on corruption/organized crime within the Police Department. When Climer disbanded the Major Police Squad, Tracy resigned in protest and formed his own detective agency. His first client was Patton's wife who wanted to know who had shot her husband. When Astral Turf revealed it was Climer behind the shooting, Tracy was knocked unconscious and put behind a police target made to resemble Flattop Jones by Climer. However Tracy was able to free himself and Climer was accidentally shot and killed by a police cadet. Feb 20, 1983
- Coffyhead (1947, 1981) - Shown constantly drinking coffee and with a head shaped like a coffee pot. After serving his sentence, he reformed himself and became owner of an espresso shop. Returned in 2022; resumed criminal activity as narcotics peddler; arrested.
- Crewy Lou (1951) - A professional portrait photographer and criminal. Sported a crew cut hair style with combined braids. Robbed mansion of millionaire Fortson B. Knox, unaware he was secretly an organized crime bigwig. She and her partner Sphinx were marked for extermination by Syndicate head "The King". Inadvertently kidnapped Bonnie Braids while being pursued by Tracy. Later died falling from the window of an observation tower after Tracy threw tear gas into it. With her last breath she told Tracy where the baby was.
- Crutch (1931) - Member of Big Boy Caprice's gang who killed Mr. Trueheart. First criminal killed by Dick Tracy. November 26, 1931
- Crystal (1974) - Girlfriend of Big Brass. She used a crystal ball to tell fortunes. Paid bond for Fencer, and was later killed by Brain after being forced to lead his gang to Big Brass's hidden cache of loot.
- Crypto (2013) - Scottish Terrier and unwitting accomplice of the Jumbler.
- Cueball (1946) - From the film Dick Tracy vs. Cueball. Bald thug who killed a diamond courier, a fence and an extortionist saloon owner before being killed by a train while trying to escape from Dick Tracy.
- "Cut" Famon (1935) - A major crime boss who may have been a successor/predecessor of Big Boy.
- Cutie Diamond (1935) - Bank robber, sadistic and cold-blooded killer and accomplice of Boris and Zora Arson. Boasted of being involved in four murders-a bank teller and three law officers (an Oklahoma sheriff; a railroad policeman, and an unknown constable). Hid in a cave guarded by wildcats in the "Ozarks" but was tracked down by Dick Tracy and a posse. Cutie vowed to kill Tracy but in a pistol gunfight it was Cutie who died of wounds and Tracy who lived.
- Czar Rennis ("Sinner" spelled backwards) (1941) - Crime boss successor to Arthur "Nip" Dolton of the slot machine racket. Killed by henchman Trigger Doom.
- Dan "The Squealer" Mucelli (1932) - In charge, along with Texie Garcia, of the city's narcotics traffic as part of Big Boy's organization. Cousin of Ribs Mocco.
- Danny Supeena (1937) - Crooked lawyer who injured and exploited his victims/accomplices (the last of these was Johnny Mintworth) to defraud insurance companies. He killed Mintworth's mother who threatened to denounce him. Mortally wounded by Dick Tracy, Supeena confessed to Mrs. Mintworth's killing before dying in the hospital. His surname is a spoof of subpoena.
- Davey Mylar aka "Mr. Crime" II aka "Treerat" (2012) - A comic book fan who lived with his widowed mother. One day, Davey stumbled across the abandoned hideout of George Alpha, the original Mr. Crime. Craving excitement (as well as a way to financially support his mother), Davey decided to re-activate Mr. Crime's criminal organization, secretly running things from his home computer. (See Mr. Crime for biography)
- Deafy Sweetfellow (1940) - Ran bicycle theft ring; hit-and-run on Junior Tracy when he discovered their racket. Tracked down and arrested when he was sprayed by a skunk.
- Debbie Thorndike (1942) - Socialite girl secretly married to Jacques. With her boyfriend Sailor Kelly, she reopened the Bird Club. Nearly killed with Dick Tracy by former brother-in-law B.B. Eyes.
- Diamond (1970) - Paroled convict who lived lavishly. After Groovy Grove joined the police force, Diamonds tried unsuccessfully to recruit him as an inside man. Eventually shot to death by Groovy.
- Diamond Tooth aka Harris Rinkles (1973) - Gang Boss whose beheaded body was found in 1962; in 1973 his missing skull was accidentally found; his killer was Keeno the Great. Diamond Tooth was the father of "Pockets" Rinkles who didn't know his parentage-he thought that his aunt Florabelle Rinkles was his grandmother.
- "Dippy" McDoogan (1933) - Thuggish accomplice of Steve "the Tramp" Brogan when Brogan was on the run after kidnapping Junior Tracy for a reward from Blind Hank Steele, who was looking for his lost son. Brogan and McDoogan hijacked a railroad section hand car from two railroad workers to get away from Tracy. Too late they found themselves on a railroad trestle with a locomotive engine bearing down on them. Junior and Brogan dove to safety into a river, but the train hit the handcar, killing McDoogan.
- Dirks (1937) - Thug in the employ of Danny Supeena and former member of the old Redrum gang. Along with Neely, tried to murder Junior Tracy. The Blank gassed them both in Dick Tracy's garage.
- Doc (1944) - Brow's henchman who helped kill the Summer sisters and a cab driver. Later killed in car accident while trying to flee from the police.
- Doc Codd (1941) - Greedy physician who amputated Krome's left arm for $10,000; bribed his friend Constable Caleb so he could escape with Krome's money. Both arrested by Dick Tracy who turned them over to the State Attorney General for disposition.
- Doc Hump (1934) - Mad scientist who tried to kill both Dick Tracy and Junior Tracy but was killed by one of the dogs he was experimenting on.
- Dr. Kyros Freezdrei (1983, 1985) - Brought Pruneface back to life from freezing. Together with Pruneface, he tried to sell the secret of "immortality" so as to set up a new Fourth Reich and also help Pruneface take revenge on Dick Tracy for the death of Mrs. Pruneface. Freezdrei was supposedly killed in the explosion of his own laboratory, but reappeared years later working with Pruneface. After developing a viral blindness which he used on Tess Trueheart, he was killed after being crushed by a satellite dish that he tried to drop on Dick Tracy and Sam Catchem.
- Dr. Klippoff (1968) - Mad scientist who tried and failed to revive a frozen Purdy Faller.
- Dr. Plain (1950) - Dr. Plain's full name was Doctor Keenan Plain and he was a one-armed surgeon and cold blooded sadistic murderer. As a beneficiary, in order to inherit the Forchune fortune he murdered Mrs. Forchune; her daughter and her daughter's husband and had his wife Mona Plain kill Mrs. Forchune's beautician. In a confrontation with Police Plain was doused with fuel from a wrecked gasoline truck and inadvertently set himself on fire. He died in the blaze. His wife was arrested and made full confession of their crimes.
- Doubleup (2011-current) - Tried to sabotage the shooting of a movie based on one of Dick's old cases. Has a verbal tic of repeating the last two words of his sentences. In 2013 he was an enforcer for B.B. Eyes charged with criminal conspiracy and assault. In Jan. 2017 he was providing security for Perenelle Flamel while out on bail for the earlier charges.
- Dubbs (1931) - Crooked ex-politician who was blackmailed by Big Boy's moll Texie Garcia. Committed suicide rather than face exposure.
- Duke aka "Duke the Dip" (1941) - Pickpocket who almost succeeded in killing Dick Tracy. Kidnapper and armed car robber murdered by the Mole. Apparently a former member of Mole's old gang. After the body was found by police, the trail led to Mole.
- Ed D. Edd aka "Machine Gun" Eddie (1943) - Flattop's gang member before and after the kidnapping of Jim Trailer and Professor Roloc Bard. Was killed in a gun battle between Flattop and Dick Tracy.
- Eddie Moppet (1952) - Racketeer killed in a gunfight with Dick Tracy and Sam Catchem on June 1, 1952. His accomplice, a knife thrower, was captured after falling into hot grease.
- Eddy (1944) - Member of Shaky's gang, killed by jumping out of a window in panic during an apartment fire.
- Edward Nuremoh ("Home run" spelled backwards) (1939) - A former pro baseball player, Nuremoh seriously dated Tess during the period when Tess was annoyed that Tracy showed no signs of proposing marriage. At first, Junior was dazzled by Nuremoh's ability to hit a small target with a thrown baseball from an extreme distance, but then became disillusioned upon learning of Nuremoh's criminal activities. When Nuremoh accidentally killed his sweetheart instead of his wife, he took his mistress' body and jumped off a cliff.
- El Tigress (1971) - Cigar-smoking revolutionary and client of Jonny Scorn. Killed with Molene in the explosion of Scorn's underground bunker.
- 88 Keyes (1943) - Piano player (his name references the number of keys on a piano) and the secret head of a murder gang for hire; his interests are music, women, money and murder. Killed his own gang member "Jinny the Girl Singer" when she found out he was going to double cross her. Eloped with Mrs A. B. Helmet and killed her for insurance money. Killed accomplice "Red Bluff". The discovery of Bluff's body by police led to Keyes' own death in a railroad shed in a gun battle with Dick Tracy. In the 1990 film, he was the piano player for Big Boy at the Club Ritz, and with the help of the Blank, framed Tracy for the murder of D.A. Fletcher.
- Empty Williams aka M.T. Williams (1951) - A gang leader who's missing part of his head. Also lover of pin-up ties. Murdered his wife Bonnie in 1951, died when a tree fell on him.
- Filthy Flora (1945) - Proprietor of the Dripping Dagger Saloon.
- Fencer (1974) - Partner of Big Brass. Hid over $2,000,000 in stolen mob money in a house. Just as Tracy and Catchem were recovering the stolen loot, a tornado destroyed both the house and the loot. Committed suicide by jumping from city bridge, along with his dog as well, but the pet was saved by Tracy.
- Flattop aka Floyd Jones Sr. (1943–1944) - Came from Chester Gould's home state of Oklahoma. Contract killer hired to murder Dick Tracy for $5,000. Decided to hold Tracy hostage and blackmail his employers for more money before doing the job. However he only wounded Tracy in a gun battle which wiped out his own gang. On the run, Flattop killed conman Hawker Davis. Bribing a blackmailing Bud Jenkins led to Jenkins' accidental death and Flattop on the run again where he met Vitamin Flintheart. Captured after trying to shoot Dick Tracy, Flattop escaped again with Flintheart as a hostage. Tracked down by Tracy, Flattop accidentally drowned while trying to escape. His name is based on the nickname for an aircraft carrier. Portrayed by William Forsythe in the film from 1990, he was the last gangster to be gunned down by Tracy. Shot multiple times, he did not fall down dead until his Tommy gun ran out of ammo.
- Flattop Jr. aka Floyd Jones Jr. (1956) - The son of Flattop, who strongly resembled him, was a talented artist and mechanical genius. A borderline juvenile delinquent, he lived in his car, which he modified by installing various electrical devices (including a stove) connected to the dashboard's cigarette lighter. Driven insane by the ghost of a girlfriend whom he had killed. Killed by Policewoman Lizz.
- Florabelle Rinkles (1973) - The discovery of a skull of a gangster Harris "Diamond Tooth" Rinkles, who had been found beheaded in 1962, led Tracy and Lizz to his psychotic half-sister who resembled a female version of Pruneface and kept a guillotine in her basement.
- Flyface (1959, 2011) - A lawyer marked by him and his whole family being personally swarming with flies to the point where a female companion is constantly spraying bug spray around him.
- Frank Diamond - Member of Big Boy's gang.
- Fred Mason (1940) - Factory owner who tried to kill Mary X for witnessing the murder of his partner Freez. Murdered by Junky Doolb after Mason failed to deliver rigged gambling equipment to the Doolb's gang.
- Gargles (1946) - Killer of Themesong's mother, driver of a glass truck, had a few henchmen, and was finally caught in a glass store where Dick Tracy used a panel of bulletproof glass to walk towards him as he wasted all of his bullets, then fell off of a platform and was impaled and dismembered by several falling shards of broken glass. Gargles profited illegally by manufacturing and bottling large quantities of ineffective mouthwash (water, sugar and a few drops of mint oil), which he and his strongarm boys would bully druggists into purchasing as merchandise. Gargles had the habit of constantly gargling with mouthwash...but always made a point of using a legitimate brand rather than his own worthless product.
- Ginger Ferrett (1941) - 16 year old Daughter of Constable Ferrett and Teenage girlfriend/moll of Trigger Doom who betrayed her father's attempts to capture Doom. Killed in a car accident trying to escape the Police with Trigger Doom.
- Goodin Plenty (1984) - Con artist/Evil twin of B.O. Plenty.
- GreenBack Eddy (1976) - Underworld figure who was killed at a baseball game by killer for hire Pucker Puss who had taken up a Syndicate "hit" contract on GreenBack.
- Gruesome (1947) - From the film Dick Tracy Meets Gruesome. Thuggish killer who by accident was exposed to a nerve gas which can simulate death. Killing the kidnapped scientist who engineered it, Prof. A. Tomic (atomic), Gruesome manipulated Dr. Lee Thal (lethal) into staging a bank holdup with the gas before later killing the man after he silenced his love Dr. I.M. Learned. Dick Tracy managed to kill Gruesome and save his body before it was accidentally cremated in a furnace. Gruesome was played by Boris Karloff, whose post-death scene was a parody of the film Frankenstein where the monster, played by Karloff, is burned in a windmill fire. Gruesome reappeared in an ironic story arc that ran from Oct. 13, 2014 to Jan. 6, 2015. Short on money, he tried to collect from Mel O. Dee. While waiting to collect, he got drafted to play the character Jonathon in the play Arsenic and Old Lace, and enjoyed it; Vitamin Flintheart was cast as 'Ted'.
- Habe Corpussle (1968) - Posie Ermine's lawyer and owner of the J & X Florist shop. Hid Posie from the police. Also the lawyer for the Human Hair gang. A play on habeas corpus.
- Halffa Millyon (1959) - Hired killer. The Rhodent hires him to murder Fatty McDonald, the farmers daughter who can identify him. Rhodent paid Millyon $30 in advance, with the promise of another $30 when the job was done. During the murder attempt, Millyon was killed by Policewoman Lizz Grove, who was acting as a decoy for Fatty at the McDonald farm. Halffa's brother "Willie the Fifth" later tried getting revenge on Lizz.
- Hammerhead (1988) - Foreign spy who planned a nuclear terrorist attack; Tracy and FBI man Jim Trailer foiled his plot while on vacation in the tropics. Hammerhead was killed by sharks.
- Hantz Turtle aka Agent 12 (1944) - Brow gunman killed by June Summers.
- Hank "HAPPY" Larson (1954) - 300 pound shotgun killer who was right-hand man for fur thief Rughead. Killed in gun battle with Dick Tracy.
- Hawker Davis (1944) - Conman and street hawker who was beaten unconscious and burned to death by Flattop.
- "Heels" Beals (1948) - "Heels" Beals was a midget who wore platform shoes with hollow built-up heels, in which he concealed stolen jewels. Beals eluded Tracy by hiding inside a giant soda bottle that was intended for use as part of an advertising billboard. While Beals was inside the bottle, workmen attached it to the billboard several hundred feet above the ground. Beals called for help but was unheard, and nearly died from thirst and exposure, before he was found and arrested. His name is a joke on the well-known expression of amazement: "Hell's Bells!". Basically a reprint of villain Jerome Trohs.
- Hed Hedges (1949) - Pearshape gang member and a part of a jewelry swindling ring. Bitten by Mugg the Dog and captured by Dick Tracy.
- Henry "Hardcase" Horan (2003) - A juvenile offender sentenced to 15 years in prison and released in 1994. He nearly killed Dick Tracy, who was trapped in a snowbank, but does not. Years later, while trying to fix a satellite navigation system, he spotted a sailboat in trouble in a storm and used a skiff to rescue the people aboard until a big wave overturned the boat. Horan sacrificed his life to save a child.
- Hi-Top Jones (1991) - Grandson of Flattop Jones, son of Angelica "Angeltop" Jones, involved in a young urban gang notorious for killing an inner-city kid (Tim Vick, a pun on "victim") for his sneakers. Sported a high-top Afro hairstyle that was popular in the 1990s.
- Horace (1940) - Black Pearl gang member captured by Jim Trailer.
- Hy Habeas (1931) - The first of many crooked lawyers connected with the underworld.Escaped after his politician client Dubbs committed suicide rather than face capture.
- Iceman aka "Johnny Snow" (1978) - Contract Killer for hire who tried to kill Dick Tracy but died of wounds; his confession gave Dick Tracy the evidence to arrest "Big Boy" who put out the Contract; the Crime Czar was so shocked at his failure to outlive Tracy that he died of Natural causes!
- Ice Man (1998)
- Influence (1946–1947, 1981) - Used special colored contact lenses to hypnotize his victims. Was brought back thirty years later, reformed and working for the FBI. Appeared in the 1990 Dick Tracy film played by Henry Silva, but was seen without his mind control abilities.
- Inspector Haddis Price (1978) - Police Department member of Organized Crime Unit who was secretly member of "The Apparatus"(i.e. Organized Crime); who was exposed by confession of dying Contract killer Johnny "The Iceman" Snow in regard to "Big Boy" attempt on Dick Tracy's life. Given immunity from prosecution and put in Witness Protection Program in return for Testimony against Gang Bosses of The Apparatus. His name means "Had His Price"!
- Irma (1946) - Ex-wife of billionaire Diet Smith, who was kept on by the company as a researcher. Falsely convinced she had been cheated out of vast royalties, she shot and wounded Diet, then killed herself.
- Itchell "Itchy" Oliver (1945) - Gangster with a skin condition which caused him to constantly scratch, hence his sobriquet. Shaky's friend, was introduced by Shaky's wife, who hoped to recover her late husband's money. Both Itchy and Mrs. B.B. Eyes had attempted to starve Tracy to death in Mrs. B-B Eyes' basement as revenge for her husband's death. Killed by Tracy in self-defense on December 23, 1945. Younger brother Twitchy would later go on to face Tracy with B-D Eyes, a younger brother of B-B Eyes. In the film from 1990, he was often seen working alongside Flattop. He was the second to last gangster to be gunned down by Tracy.
- J.C. Nitials (1941) - Little Face Finny gang member. After using a monogrammed handkerchief during a robbery, he was burned by Finny on the chest as punishment for leaving a clue and subsequently was sent to the hospital. However, the burning was witnessed by building cleaners who reported the incident to the police, which put Tracy on the trail of Finny.
- Jacques (1941) - Brother of B.B. Eyes and B.D. Eyes and owner of the Bird Club. Tried to kill Dick Tracy with a boulder. Later killed by Dick Tracy when he tried to kill his wife Debbie Thorndike.
- Jer (1967) - Henchman of Piggy Butcher who assisted Piggy in the forcible shave of Mrs. Chin Chillar.
- Jerome Trohs and Mamma (1940) (Trohs is "short" spelled backwards. See also Mamma) - Public lawyer and sadistic secret gang leader who abandoned his girlfriend Mamma to the police. Hid out as performer "Joe Atom" in a Wild West rodeo show. Swindled an old couple out of ownership of Mountaintop Lodge where Mamma tracked him down and scalded him to death in an outdoor shower.
- Jim Pistol (1949) - Health spa owner appearing as comic relief in the Pearshape Tone storyline. Reappeared years later with Tone as his assistant.
- Jimmy "Trigger" Doom (1941) - Stick-up man and killer of his own boss Czar Rennis. Boyfriend of Ginger Ferrett. Tried to kill Dick Tracy with an enraged bull, but was instead captured.
- Jimmy White (1933) - Thief and associate of Big Boy Caprice who twice tried to kill writer Jean Penfield from writing a book about Big Boy's crime organization. He only succeeded in killing himself in a car accident.
- Jinny Lynn (1943) - Part of 88 Keyes' gang. Murdered by 88 Keyes when she discovered he planned to double cross her and Piano Tuner. After her body was found by Dick Tracy, Piano Turner confessed.
- Joe Period (1955) - Partner to Flattop Jr. during a citywide crime wave, responsible for the murder of Nothing Yonsen and the sister of Policewoman Lizz. Also killed Doctor Forbes and Paul Paperclip. Sentenced to life in prison.
- Joe (1944) - Brow spy henchman, killed by June Summer.
- Johnny Ramm (1938) - Ran a protection racket until Tracy faked insanity/suicide and went undercover with Ramm gang under alias of Reppoc ("Copper" spelled backwards) to bring the Ramm gang to justice. Appears briefly in the big gangster meeting in the 1990s movie.
- Johnny Nothing (2010) - Grandson of Frank "Faceless" Redrum, a.k.a. "The Blank". Appeared in a white blank face mask. Committed a murder during a play with Dick Tracy and almost killed Tracy as well. Wounded and in custody.
- John Lavir (1939) - Brother of Lola Lavir, the mistress accidentally killed by Edward Nuremoh before his suicide. Stabbed/injured by Tess Trueheart. He was later killed by one of his own guard dogs whom he had cruelly treated. [Lavir is rival spelled backwards]
- JoJo Nidle (1938) - Leader of a gang of railroad robbers who kidnapped Junior Tracy and his friend. His gang killed a town marshal who accidentally came across Junior Tracy's kidnapping. The gang was almost lynched for the officer's murder before being arrested by Dick Tracy; Nidle tried to escape by hijacking a train engine, but was pursued and killed by Dick Tracy.
- Jonny Scorn (1971) - Partner of Pouch and Molene. His trademark was an addiction to popcorn. He kept a movie-style popcorn machine in his penthouse residence, with a jumbo-sized salt shaker and paper bags, and offered freshly popped popcorn to his visitors. After Molene blew herself up in an ammunition bunker, Pouch avenged her death by placing blasting caps in Scorn's popcorn machine, killing Scorn on August 4, 1971.
- Jules Sparkle (1945) - Jeweler.
- Jumbler (2013) - Alias of K.T. Hunter. Wore glasses with the number 13 on them and a blue beret with the letter "J". On March 10, 2013, he sent a video email to Dick Tracy claiming to be a Scottish rummage sale "jumbler". Had a tear-gas cane and a Scottish Terrier named Crypto. On March 18, 2013, he stole a collection bag from a merchant dressed as a "reeve" (olden precursor of sheriff) at a Madrigal festival. Later stole a collection of rare comic books and the proceeds from a jewelry store. Tracy discovered that Jumbler would "announce" his robbery subject via a hacked computer jumbled word puzzle that appeared in the newspapers before he struck. Captured April 14, 1013 by Tracy with the help of a Jumbler ad. Synergistically, a series of syndicated Jumble word puzzles began April 3, 2013 featuring a cartoon of Dick Tracy with the puzzle. In a comics crossover, characters from the comic strip Funky Winkerbean decided to attend a police auction of the stolen comics recovered from the Jumbler after his trial on January 19, 2015. Likewise, Dick Tracy was in the Funky Winkerbean comic strip at the police auction on January 20, 2015!
- "Junky" Doolb ("Blood" spelled backwards) (1940) - Gang leader who killed Fred Mason. Later killed by a police after being tricked by Jerome Trohs into escaping from jail with an empty gun.
- Karpse (1938) - In addition to having a chronic case of Doonesbury eyes and an insultingly thin mustache, Karpse made his money by producing chemical weapons for foreign countries. He spends most of his storyline on the run from Tracy and even works at Tess Trueheart's family bakery under an alias! Karpse ends up accidentally lighting himself on fire and dying on December 23, 1938 - just in time for Christmas.
- Kenneth Grebb (1932) - Blackmailer who ended up buried alive in a landslide.
- Kenno the Great (1974) - Professional knife thrower and exposed as the killer of Florabelle Rinkles' half-brother Harris "Diamond Tooth" Rinkles in 1962. Shot and killed April 12, 1974 when he tried to stab Policewoman Lizz.
- The King (1951) - Powerful organized crime figure in the Crewy Lou continuity who is, apparently, Big Boy's successor as boss of the city's mobs. Shot by Crewy Lou. Succeeded by Mr. Crime.
- Kitten Sisters (1956) - Three triplets/robbers.
- Kitty (1940) - Girlfriend of Krome, who initially stands by during his crime spree but eventually tries to stop him, for which he electrocutes her.
- Krome (1940) - A hitman who preferred to murder his victims using toys like the wind-up kangaroo toy pictured in this portrait. He also ran the criminal organization known as Crime Inc. Krome was on the run in a blizzard from Dick Tracy when he froze to death reaching for his gun.
- Laffy Smith (1943) - Deceptively jolly narcotics kingpin who would burglarize doctor offices to steal narcotics; murdered a doctor who caught him in the act. Upon reading that one of his female customers had attempted suicide, he laughed so hard that he broke his jaw. Afraid to go to a doctor and be recognized, his condition eventually became fatal. His brother, Lt. Kirk Smith, was a war hero fighting in the China-Burma-India theater.Laffy refused to see him, not wanting his brother's reputation to be tainted.Dick Tracy agreed to keep the family secret.
- Larceny Lu (1932, 1934) - Leader of a gang of automobile thieves. British by birth, came to USA after Scotland Yard made things uncomfortable for her. Returned to blackmail Mary Steele about the whereabouts of her long-lost son Jackie(JUNIOR TRACY). Captured alive at amusement park hideout.
- Lee Ting (1938) - A member of a criminal organization that operated a human trafficking ring out of Dick Tracy's city. He was Chinese. The criminal organization to which Lee Ting belonged was referred to as "The Syndicate". It has not been established if this is the same organization that was an early version of The Apparatus, or if it was different group that was dedicated solely to human trafficking.
- Lispy (1976) - Secret head of a trio of female bank robbers gang and friend of Pucker Puss; two members of her gang are captured by police after one is killed. Literally on the run from the police with her accomplice Pucker Puss in a stolen van, Lispy dies of natural causes {one of the few Dick Tracy villains (such as Big Boy) who do not die of violence} Body found by Dick Tracy and Sam Catchem.
- "Lips" Manlis aka Bob Honor (1936) - Early villain in the strip. Later reformed and renamed himself "Bob Honor", helping Tracy on a case. In the Dick Tracy film, Manlis (played by Paul Sorvino) was kidnapped by his former underling "Big Boy" Caprice and forced to sign over his crime assets, then put in concrete overshoes and dumped into the lake by Flattop.
- Little Face aka Leonard Finny (1941, 2011) - Gang leader/murderer/car and taxi hijacker/kidnapper/racketeer nicknamed for his unusually small face, further emphasized by his large ears. Tried to escape from Dick Tracy after nearly drowning in a pond. He was recaptured by Tracy after losing both ears to frostbite from being trapped in a freezer (as well as being covered with bee stings). After his release from prison in 2011, he worked with the police in infiltrating the Panda/Mr. Crime gang. In the 1990 film, was one of the five gangsters under Lips Manlis killed by Flattop and Itchy at the beginning of the movie.
- Lt. Teevo (2007, 2012) - {Pun on T.V.} Communications expert in the Police Department and informant for Mr. Crime and Panda. Shot and wounded Chief Patton when Patton refused to be recruited for Mr. Crime. Killed by a man-eating plant when the Panda Talent Agency was being raided by the police.
- Madam Parfum (1968) - Partner of Posie Ermine; owns a perfume shop "front" for hijacked perfume; arrested.
- Mamma (1940) - Overweight, thuggish and sadistic girlfriend of Jerome Trohs who crushed Dick Tracy's hand; escaped from prison and became a truck and car hijacker; scalded Trohs to death in an outdoor shower. In hand-to-hand combat, Tracy used the sling from his injured hand to subdue Mamma by nearly strangling her; she ended up handcuffed and sent back in prison.
- Mar, The (1946)
- Marrg Plainsman (1967) - Secretary at a research center who stole an atomic device for Piggy Butcher, only to be killed by him. A hidden tape recorder she had with Piggy before her death gave Tracy evidence of Piggy's involvement.
- Marty (1944) - Shaky gang member who was shot through the hand and captured by Dick Tracy.
- Matty Square (1965) - Stolen car parts gang leader who has a cigar-smoking cat on his shoulder. Tries to kill Moon Maid after she "zaps" three of his gang who tried to mug her/run her down; only succeeds in killing two of his own gang; after which Tracy kills the hitman that Square hired. Square works for Mr. Bribery, who takes Square's cat and his sister Ugly Christine. Accidentally boiled alive while trying to set a trap for Dick Tracy.
- Matty Squared - An Artificial Intelligence created Apr. 10, 2016 by Dr. Ygor Glitch for Mr. Bribery, with the memories and character of Matty Square; his on-screen avatar even looks like Matty Square. So far he has served as a hacker-bank robber and enforcer for Mr. Bribery.
- Max (1931) - Big Boy gangster gunman. Opened fire on Dick Tracy and Tess Truehart after Tracy took Ribbs Mocco's place; bullets hit a truck instead. Apparently part of a carload of gunmen sent by Big Boy after Tracy and Tess; in a car race through the city the gangsters car went through a railroad crossing and was destroyed by a passing train.
- May and June Summer' (1944) - Pickpocket country twins who came to the city to break into radio. Ironically, they lost their biggest chance at show business when, after escaping from Pat Patton, they refused Vitamin Flintheart's offer to work in his show - after seeing him hanging out at Police Headquarters, they mistake him for a police spy. Both twins got mixed up with The Brow who blackmailed them into his service by torturing one sister and forcing the other sister to collect his spy reports. They managed to escape the Brow and were placed in protective custody. However, while leaving town, the Brow murdered their cab driver and the car crashed into the river, trapping and drowning both sisters. Tracy's investigation of their deaths led to the Brow's capture.
- Measles Enog (1945, 1981, 2012) - Trademark is red spots on face. Head of a dope smuggling racket. Escaping from Dick Tracy after a train wreck, Measles boarded a train compartment and tried to take Vitamin Flintheart and his wife hostage, until Vitamin knocked him out with a liquor bottle. Escaping again from the train onto a flooded plain, Measles tried to flee from Tracy using a stolen boat and a swimming horse, but was captured. At the jail Measles tried to escape with smuggled tear gas capsules, but only ended up teargassing himself and was locked in a cell by Chief Brandon.

Returned in 2012, still dealing in narcotics. Revealed he had suffered from chronic pain issues since the 1945 train wreck.Tried to get long-delayed revenge on Gravel Gertie, but she cut him with an axe. Died when he overdosed on pain medication.

- "Melody" Fiske (1947) - Henchman in the film Dick Tracy Meets Gruesome. Hospitalized after a nasty car crash during an attempt to evade Tracy, Melody eventually died within the night.
- Micky (1941) - Trolley driver, part of the Littleface Finny gang who was killed in the hospital by henchman J.C. and his accomplice as he was confessing his part in a robbery by the gang.
- Micky (1942) - B.B. Eyes gang member, knocked out by his escaping boss and captured by police.
- Mike De Luso (1944) - In 1943 he ran the Ajax Cafe which was used as an underworld hangout and gave a key to Shaky who in 1944 used the deserted building to hold the kidnapped Snowflake {Falls} Flintheart after her marriage to ham actor Vitamin Flintheart. Dec 15, 1944
- Mindy Ermine (1968) - Spoiled juvenile delinquent daughter of Posie Ermine and evil twin counterpart of Sparkle Plenty. Arrested after trying to stab Lizz the policewoman when she recognized Lizz as an undercover detective. Later reformed as Mysta Chimera.
- Miss Deal (1965) - Secretary to Mr. Bribery. When she unknowingly led police to Bribery's hideout, he tried to kill her. She kicked him in the face before being arrested.
- Miss Fire (1966) - Appeared in a Dick Tracy mini-comic, when Tracy was a spokesman for an auto shocks and car battery manufacturer. Miss Fire was a nightclub singer and part of a diamond smuggling ring who was foiled by Tracy and Catchem; her gimmick is singing - and speaking - in rhyme.
- Miss Intro aka Neva Intro aka "The Painted Lady" (1968-1969) - Beautiful daughter of Mr. Intro and head of a crime syndicate that stole women's hair. She drove her wig supplier nearly insane with demands for off-white blond wigs. She owned a night club called "The Painted Lady" which served as a front for her criminal activities (women patrons were assaulted and their hair stolen). Most of her clothes were painted on. Later killed by her boyfriend Hy Jacky.
- Mistress of Death (2001) - Con woman who got money by "preaching" that "Life is short..do what you want." Hid the money in an abandoned church. When three of her co-workers tried to rob her, she killed them and made it look like she and her children were victims. When the victims prove not to be the Mistress and her two children, Tracy releases an innocent suspect when he accidentally comes in contact with the Mistress' daughter who really has found religion. The Mistress flees to Florida where, in order to find more money to finance her lifestyle, she reinvents herself as a "Mistress of Faith". Before Tracy and Catchem can arrest her, she is electrocuted by lightning that strikes a metal pole she was holding.
- Mole, The aka Louis Rewes Jr. ("Sewer" spelled backwards) (1941, 1971, 1981, 2012, 2013) - A career criminal since 1911 and ex-counterfeiter who was thought to have been killed by own gang in 1926. Literally brought from the underground from collapsed tunnel and captured by Dick Tracy. Confessed that he saved his own life by promising his gang a permanent hideout free of charge as long as he lived; instead he killed them and took their money (see Duke above). The Mole reappeared 30 years later, reformed and stricken with arthritis, in a cameo concerning his granddaughter Molene, Johnny Scorn and Pouch. During this storyline, Tracy confided to his wife Tess that he had "always liked the Mole." Along with Pouch, saved Spencer Toad from serial killer Simon "Sweatbox" Baux in 2013.
- Molene (1971) - Granddaughter of the Mole. Trapped in an underground munitions bunker by the police, she grabbed a hand grenade from an accomplice and blew up herself and the accomplice. Looked like a female version of the Mole, but usually kept her face veiled. Her partner, Jonny Scorn, escaped via a secret escape tunnel. All that was ever found of Molene was her hairnet on a bush.
- Mona Clyde (1945) - Secretary to Mr. Sparkle.
- Morgancoin a.k.a. Agent 20 (1942) - Pruneface accomplice who was trapped by the police in a house after he tried to escape from, and was subsequently killed by Pruneface.
- Morin Plenty (1957) - Father of B.O. Plenty. Visited Tracy when he was 87 years old, wealthy inventor whose wife was killed by con men The Clipso Brothers.
- Moldy Mink (1972) - Loan shark financier of the auto mechanic Girly Mac. (As a subplot to the Homer "Peanutbutter" Barley story, Mac had been assaulted and carjacked of his $16,000 "Funny Car" racer by the kidnappers of "Peanutbutter"; the kidnappers thinking they had killed Barley tried to escape from the Police but were killed). Mink tried to extort $11,000 from Mac while Dick Tracy was present; because Mink was a "wanted" man for over a year he tried to kill Tracy at point blank range with a Luger pistol; Tracy an expert in hand to hand and unarmed combat managed to strike Mink which resulted in Minks shot going wild and also allowed Tracy to activate an automatic Garage door opener which came down and pinned Mink. Mink was arrested by Tracy. {This is one of the shortest time Dick Tracy cases on record (1–8 October 1972)}
- Mousey Rattner (1949, 1981) - Shoplifter who created distractions by letting mice loose in shops. After serving her sentence, she reformed and opened up a pet store.
- Mountain Man (1997)
- Mr. Bribery aka "Mr. Bigg" (1965-1966, 1967, 2015) - Brother of Ugly Christine. Murderer, drug smuggler, pickpocket, influence peddler, briber and blackmailer. Perhaps the most gruesome of Tracy's villains, Mr. Bribery decapitated people and shrunk their heads. He wanted Dick Tracy to be part of his collection and set out to kill him. He owned a cigar-smoking cat and maintained discipline in his gang by branding them. He had a habit of talking to his rose plant and making decisions based on a Ouija board. Bribery was sent to the State Penitentiary. He escaped from prison by bribing the Chin Chillars to steal a Space Coupe with the offer of trying to recover a fortune of his money that was lost in Earth's orbit. After recovering the loot, the Chin Chillars gave Bribery alcohol to drink until he passed out and then "returned" Bribery to prison by dropping/killing him from a great height through the prison carpentry shop roof. The money was then destroyed while escaping from Dick Tracy. On June 25, 2015, it was revealed to a kidnapped Diet Smith that "Mr. Bigg" of the Blackhearts was in fact Mr. Bribery, who apparently had survived the fall after all.
- Mr. Crime aka George Alphanone aka "George Alpha" (1952) - Powerful organized crime figure, apparently the King's successor as head of the city's (and possibly the nation's) mob. To all appearances a legitimate businessman named George Alpha, he was, in reality, the "boss of all crime in America." After being killed in a shootout with Tracy and Catchem, he was replaced briefly by Odds Zonn and later by "Willie the Fifth". On June 17, 2012, Davey Mylar found Alpha's old strongbox of blackmail information and used the internet to set himself up as the new Mr. Crime. Mylar was killed in the police raid on his HQ and his money was given to his mother by his associate Blaze Rize.
- Mr. Intro (1968) - Successor to Odds Zonn. Gang leader who tried to control world economy with stolen moon gold. Took pains to keep his identity hidden via a black mesh/chain mail mask (worn along with bulletproof underwear). Destroyed, along with his entire organization, by Dick Tracy with an atomic laser beam. His real identity was never revealed.
- Mr. Kleen (2013) - Criminal defense attorney. When asked by the late Mr. Crime's associates to represent B.B. Eyes, Doubleup and Abner Kadaver so they would not "sing" to avoid long prison sentences, Kleen claimed he could get off Double Up and B-B Eyes, but not Kadaver.
- Mr. Kroywen (1940) - Wealthy would-be-scientist who kidnapped his infant grandson to experiment on.
- Mr. Oily (Not to be confused with the 1941 Oily) (2001, 2006) - A killer whose main MO is boiling his victims in steaming oil. Was captured by Tracy in 2001, then broke free and kidnapped Tracy and Lizz. He was eventually defeated by a minor ally, Don Quick Oatie, who caused a fire which caused Oily's accomplice "Boily" to fall back into his own vat of oil; later Oatie "attacks" a "dragon" {an electric windmill} where Oily and Slick have taken refuge; Oily and Slick accidentally fall into an electric power plant and are killed when it blows up.
- Mr. Pops (2009) - Former high tech weapons dealer who was ratted out by one of his employees. Found out that the employee used the Witness Protection Program to become Ringo, a ringmaster, so he disguised himself as the clown Mr. Pops to kill Ringo. Nearly gets eaten by a tiger, but is rescued by Dick Tracy before being arrested.
- Mrs. A.B. Helmet (1943) - Hired ex-lover 88 Keyes to murder her wealthy husband for insurance money, only to be murdered by 88 Keyes in return when he left her asleep in a car to be hit by a train.
- Mrs. Anna Enog (1945) - Corrupt jail matron and part of dope smuggling ring at the County Jail where Gravel Gertie was imprisoned. When Gertie caught on to the fact that they were using her as part of the racket, Enog tried to push her into the pump machinery but was killed when she accidentally slipped into the machinery herself. She was the mother of gangster Measles.
- Mrs. Fencer (1974) - Wife of Fencer. Killed by a tornado.
- Mrs. Kincaid (1954)
- Mrs. Mahoney (1945) - Fourth wife of Shaky and mother of Breathless Mahoney; knew of Shaky after she went to school with his sister. She also figured out where Shaky had hidden and had Breathless find Shaky's remains with the unwitting help of the police. After losing a contest to Breathless over who can stay awake the longest and keep Shaky's money {due to a bad heart}, she tries to stop Breathless from leaving with Shaky's money by shooting Breathless in the shoulder; taken into custody by the police. Later hired Shoulders to recover the money. After wanting to go straight, she was talked into helping Itchy get the money from B.O. Plenty; was killed by Itchy when she betrayed him.
- Mrs. Pruneface (1943) - The wife of Pruneface, tried to avenge him by killing Tracy, but later ended up getting shot and killed by the mayor's wife after Mrs Pruneface drowned a party guest in the Mayor's swimming pool. It was later discovered that Pruneface was still alive and Mrs. Pruneface had gotten herself killed for nothing. Like her husband, her face is also disfigured from a gasoline fire while escaping from the "Old Country". She and Pruneface began their married lives as vaudeville entertainers---and she learned to be expert with a heavy-duty whip. Also famous for her delicious onion soup.
- Mrs. Van Hoosen (1945) - Wealthy recluse who appears briefly in the Breathless Mahoney episode. Later has a cameo as a wealthy recluse in the Archie's TV Funnies version of "Dick Tracy".
- Mrs. Volts (1948) - A vile villain who ran a gang who specialized in hijacking goods and breaking street lights to use as signals. She often pulled at her dog's hair and hurt it for fun because she's a sick scumbag. She died of asphyxiation on April 30, 1948, hiding under a kitchen sink as poison gas flooded the house.
- Mumbles (1947, 1955, 1979, 1990, 1994, 2011, 2012, 2013) - Guitar player of the "Mumbles Quartet" singing band who also steals women's rings off their fingers; murderer and thief, later a blackmailer/extortionist. Twice reappeared after seemingly being "killed" in both 1947 and 1955. In 1979 Mumbles returns, posing as his own clone in an attempt to swindle Diet Smith. In 1990 he was seen again in the comic strip being arrested after serving as a comic relief "consultant" in a Dick Tracy movie. Mumbles dies October 30, 1994 and is buried at sea-but comes back to a life in crime in 2011. His trademark is never speaking clearly; instead he is always mumbling. This was indicated whenever he spoke by letters being left out of his dialogue and other people often asking "What did he say?" Played by Dustin Hoffman in the 1990 film.
- Murky Depps (1986) - Involved in payola. Like Mumbles he does not speak clearly. This was indicated by just a squiggle in his dialogue balloons. His intent could be discerned by his close associates and they would echo what he had said.
- Mussell (1941) - Little Face's gang member, captured by Dick Tracy along with Little Face at the end of the episode.
- Nah Tay (1965-1966) - Headshrinker who works for Mr Bribery; when he decides to kill Bribery instead to Tracy, he is double crossed by Bribery who tips off the brother of a "head shrinking" victim; Nah Tay is kidnapped and thrown out of a borrowed Space Coupe into outer space; body recovered by Dick Tracy
- Nat the Fur King aka Nat Natnus ("Suntan" spelled backwards) (1939) - A fur thief and the leader of a fur-stealing gang that included Duffy and Nick. Nat the Fur King and Nick were arrested and taken to jail.
- Neely (1937) - Supeena thug who, along with "Dirks", tried to murder Junior Tracy. The Blank gassed them both in Dick Tracy's garage. Dirks and Neely were members of the old Redrum gang.
- Nellie Wharton (1943; 2013) - Naive farm girl tricked by 88 Keyes into helping him escape from Dick Tracy and drive her father's stolen car. When she realized who he really was (after she sees him hold up and rob a country store), she wrecked the car to try to kill herself, 88 Keyes and Red Bluff. She survives and returns to the farm. She still appears as a young girl on her father's farm in July 2013!
- Nellie Biggs (1949) - Part of a diet swindle run by the villain Pearshape. Captured by Tracy. Sentenced to five years and then paroled.
- Newsuit Nan (1952) - Information broker and associate of Mr. Crime; strangled by Mr. Crime. November 4, 1952
- Nilon Hoze (1946) - A pun on nylon hose. Under arrest for murder, she is killed when her husband commits suicide while handcuffed to her by running in front of a speeding truck.
- No Face (2003) - Criminal who has no face.
- Nofel (anagram of "Felon") aka Agent 26 (1944) - An Axis spy in World War I and World War II and illegal alien who was the Brow's spy in a rooming house; captured by Dick Tracy. The Summer Sisters tried to pawn his field glasses and were captured by the Brow.
- Nothing Yonson (1955, 1956) - Owner of popular supper club with heavy underworld connections. Friend of OODLES, helped him hide out upstate after he was wanted for murder. When teenage thug Joe Period sought his aid in hiding out, Yonson instead loaded his unconscious form aboard a fast freight train, figuring Period would die. But Period survived and returned to shotgun Yonson to death. Yonson lived long enough to name Period as his killer. His face was a scrunched-up series of little dots.
- Notta Chin Chillar (née Fallar) aka Notta Fallar (1967, 1968, 2013) - Femme fatale wife of George Chin Chillar and sister of Purdy Fallar. She was a young woman who wore a skimpy black bunny-like costume, high heel boots, large dangling earrings, a feathery necklace with matching bracelets, a dagger tucked into her bustier, and upswept blonde hair. She also wore a small beard on her chin, as did her husband, who often called her "Doll" and "Baby." The Chin Chillars conspired with Mr. Bribery to steal a police Space Coupe and collect $100,000 that was orbiting the Earth. The trio successfully captured the money, but the Chin Chillars got Bribery drunk and killed him by dropping him from a great height into the prison from which he had been freed. In a 1968 television documentary, Chester Gould identified Notta Chin Chillar as one of the most popular characters in the history of the Dick Tracy strip.
- Numbers - "Big Boy" Caprice's accountant. Portrayed by James Tolkan in the 1990 film.
- Odds Zonn (1952, a pun on the phrase "odds on") - Successor to "Mr. Crime." His gimmick was tossing dice in one hand. Tried to get rid of Tracy, first by murder and then by bribery. An armored car robbery caused him and his daughter to suffer radiation poisoning. Killed by his own bullet which bounced off Tracy's bulletproof glass.
- Ogden (1960) - Full name Meriwether J.Ogden; con man and accomplice of Spots. Educated criminal who spoke mostly in rhyme, to Spots' great annoyance.
- Oily (1941) - Gas station attendant and secret accomplice of The Mole. After being wounded and knocked unconscious by Mole he was taken away by the police, unblocking the hidden door to Mole's tunnel which allowed Tracy to escape. That specific strip was published the day after Pearl Harbor and is possibly the best known by those who kept December 8, 1941 issues of newspapers.
- Old Mike the Smuggler (1933) - Tried to kill Chief Brandon and Junior Tracy by blowing his own ship up, but only succeeded in killing himself.
- Olive Tomate (1959) - The secretary of Willie the Fifth, and a former carhop.
- One-Eyed Jack (2009) - Thief, owner of a high-end casino and Queenie's brother. He framed B.O. Plenty by giving him a large amount of money. He, like Queenie, dressed like a playing card, with the exception that he has only one eye. He was killed by the King of Clubs.
- Oodles (1955) - A 469 pounds criminal who was obsessed with his weight.In 1936,he and his gang murdered wealthy contractor George Vulcan at the request of his greedy wife,who has been paying t hem blackmail for 19 years since--enabling the gang to live in luxury and take very few chances.But Vulcan's skeleton was discovered in late 1955 and identified---and gang member BENNY THE GRIP was tricked into imnplicating Oodles.A panicky Oodles murdered t he widown Vulcan but he left his calorie counter at the scene of a crime.( a diary detailing his "Battle With The Bulge") While on the lam he got a haircut and tried losing weight but he couldn't lose Dick Tracy. Tracy shot him dead on December 21, 1955,after tracing a large food order to his new hideout.
- "Open-Mind" Monty aka Monty Hepbeat (1954) - Brother of Sticks Hepbeat. He has a little knife blade stuck in his forehead from a previous fight...so he claims.
- The Pallette Twins (1963) - Not satisfied with being famous modern art painters, they ran a global narcotics ring from inside a hollowed-out mountain in Virginia. Both killed in a helicopter crash.
- Palmy (1942) - Part of B-B Eyes' gang who helped kidnap Patrolman O'Malley; captured by Dick Tracy after a gun battle.
- Panda (1941, 1952, 2011) - Made a cameo appearance as a member of the Little Face Finny gang who collected the money for Charley Yenom's ransom for Littleface. The original Mr. Crime's right-hand man who tossed Tonsils to the barracuda. Captured by Dick Tracy, served prison, and was recruited by the new Mr. Crime to run his "Injustice League" of criminals. Had Abner Kadaver kill the other three members of Mumbles' quartet. Killed by a barracuda when he accidentally fell into the same pool Tonsils had been killed in years before.
- Paroll Lea (1966) - Ex-convict killed by his accomplices. Found by Tracy in a city park. His name is a play on the term "parolee".
- Peaches De Cream (1972) - Used his smooth, beardless complexion to disguise himself as a woman. Arrested by Tracy for robbery in 1938 and exposed/arrested again by Tracy in 1972.
- Pearshape Tone (1949, 1981) - Originally a pot-bellied swindler who operated a sham mail-order diet business as well as a stolen jewelry ring. After serving his sentence, he became a genuine health fanatic, slimmed down, reformed, and returned to the strip in a brief cameo as an assistant to Jim Pistol. He is Chester Gould's caricature of himself.
- Pedro Zelene (1949) - Helicopter pilot blackmailed by Pearshape for his part in the robbery/murder of elderly widow Mrs. Waldo. Abandoned Pearshape in the lions' den at the zoo.
- Pete Reppoc (1938) - Member of Johnny Ramm's gang who, after being bailed out of jail. gave police evidence to convict Ramm's gang. Revealed to be Dick Tracy in disguise, his name ("Reppoc" being copper spelled backwards) being a clue to his real identity.
- Piano Tuner (1943) - Part of 88 Keyes' gang who murdered A.B. Helmet for money. Confessed about the gang's activities after Jinny the Girl Singer was murdered and that A.B. Helmet was the gang's fourth killing.
- Piggy Butcher (1967-1968) - Murderer and stolen car gang leader, never seen without his transistor radio and earphone. He took the Chin Chillars prisoner when they sought refuge on his "farm" (actually a stolen car operation) and made the beautiful Mrs. Chin Chillar his personal slave and paramour. The Chin Chillars then helped Dick Tracy and the police to invade Piggy's farm, and Piggy was successfully taken into custody when Moon Maid lasered him into submission. Obsessed with taking revenge on Moon Maid, Piggy concocted a crazy plan to kidnap her by sending Pollyanna and his men to a police ball to subdue her with a stolen laser gun. The plan failed when the laser gun accidentally went off, vaporizing Pollyanna and Piggy's men. On the run from Dick Tracy and bankrupt after his organization had been smashed by the police, Piggy was hunted down and killed by the Chin Chillars.
- Pinhead (2002) - A bank robber who, with his gang of seven other people, pretended to be a group of terrorists, with Pinhead cleverly disguising his overly small head with a larger mask.
- Pinkie the Stabber (1931) - First criminal arrested by Dick Tracy, before Tracy even joined the police force. Ex-boxer and stick-up ace who tried to disguise himself as a woman in police custody, but was tricked into revealing himself by Tracy with a left hook.
- Piston Puss (1966) - Appeared in a Dick Tracy mini-comic when Dick Tracy was also a spokesman for an auto shocks and car battery manufacturer. Piston was an auto parts store robber whose plans are foiled by Tracy and Catchem; his gimmick is a head shaped like an auto piston.
- Pollyanna (1967) - Luscious moll of Piggy Butcher whom Piggy tried to use to kidnap Moon Maid. She dressed up like Moon Maid as part of a scheme to crash a police costume ball and capture Moon Maid. A laser gun used in this plot accidentally went off, killing her and three others.
- Poptop Jones - The father of Flattop, Auntie Flattop, Blowtop, and Sharptop who made his only appearance during the Sharptop continuity. Poptop was a laid-back rural character, similar to B.O. Plenty, with a penchant for guzzling soda (or perhaps beer?) from an endless supply of cans with "pop-top" openers. The consumption of all that carbonated beverage caused Poptop to belch constantly. He considered the rest of the family a disgrace and wanted nothing more to do with them.
- Posie Ermine (1968, 2016) - Wears dark glasses and a posie in his hat; racketeer hijacker of stolen perfume and stolen guns. Killed a cereal company executive because his daughter did not win a cereal contest trip to the moon. Captured after accidentally falling into his own quicksand trap. Killed in 2016 while trying to protect his daughter from being kidnapped.
- Pouch (1971, 2013) - Accomplice of Molene and Jonny Scorn. Had a face vaguely resembling a kangaroo's face. Pouch was originally an immensely fat man who exhibited himself in a freak show. He drastically lost weight, but his skin did not shrink; it formed a "dewlap" at his throat and similar pouches all over his body. Pouch had snap fasteners surgically implanted into these, and used the pouches to conceal contraband. Got away with killing Jonny Scorn because Tracy thought Scorn's death was an accident. Made a cameo appearance as a balloon-seller who helped Mole save Spencer Toad from killer Simon "Sweatbox" Baux (February 15, 2013). Has made off-on appearances since then as an "information broker" who sells to both sides of the law.
- Professor Emirc (1939; Emirc is crime spelled backwards) - Aided Stooge Viller after he got out of jail; inventor who sold criminal gadgets to underworld.
- Professor Linwood J. Starling (1945) - Appeared in the Dick Tracy movie. A stargazing, charlatan-seer and extortionist. Killed by "Splitface".
- Professor Roloc Bard (1940) - Scientist (whose name is "drab color" spelled backwards) kidnapped by Yogee Yamma to make gas to hypnotize wealthy widows; rescued by Dick Tracy. In a 1985 Dick Tracy story Bard is kidnapped by Flattop Jones and handed over to Pruneface in 1944. This, despite Pruneface dying in 1942. Died of natural causes in 1968, taking formulas he deemed "too dangerous" to the grave with him.
- Pruneface aka Boche ("German") (1942, 1983, 1999, 2025) - German sabotage agent whose plans against America are unraveled when his accomplice Cal Bullet Jr. comes under investigation for the murder of his own father. Other accomplices are Tojo the spy, Clara the disk jockey and Morgancoin. He kills Cal Bullet Jr. and tries to kill Dick Tracy and Patrolman O'Copper, but ends up with a broken leg after trying to catch Junior Tracy, who made off with a sabotage device belonging to him. Cornered in a freezing house by Dick Tracy and the police, Pruneface is captured and nearly frozen. Reappears years later with unrepentant Nazi Dr. Kryos Freezdrei who unfreezes Pruneface back to life. Pruneface again tries to kill Tracy—for the death of Mrs. Pruneface—by freezing. Tracy almost "dies" but is brought back to life by Sam Catchem. Pruneface is captured by an Israeli agent and taken to trial abroad for war crimes from which he escapes and is imprisoned again; he is finally killed when he was the target of a liberation attempt by his granddaughter and great-granddaughter Prunella and Prune Hilda, but the plan failed at the last second, and Pruneface was sent plunging to his death from a mountain gondola over Berchesgarden, Germany . His final words were "Sieg Heil". In 2025 it's revealed that Pruneface is still alive. His trademark is wrinkled lines down the sides of his cheeks. In the 1990 Dick Tracy movie, Pruneface was killed by the Blank after the abduction of police spy Bug Bailey. (The comic strip showed a movie version of the Dick Tracy story being filmed which had actors playing both Pruneface and Flattop Jones together firing machine guns at Dick Tracy).
- Prunella (1985) - Alternately identified as the daughter of Pruneface or his granddaughter through a son who died in the Korean War. Partnered with fellow villainous female offspring Angelica "Angeltop" Jones (daughter of Flattop) and Quiver Trembly (daughter of Shaky). Sometimes aided by her own daughter, Prune Hilda.
- Pucker Puss (1976) - Killer who had false teeth and a small "pucker" of a mouth. Killed after kidnapping Policewoman Lizz.
- Purdy Fallar (1968, 2013) - Murderer, thief, and brother of Notta Chin Chillar. He was quite handsome (Lizz and Moon Maid swooned when he flirted with them), and his name was a pun on "pretty fellow." He grew extremely long sharp fingernails on the first two fingers of his right hand, which he used to slice open giant escargot (large snails native to the Moon) to extract their meat. Purdy kept in practice by slicing open grapefruits with his fingers. He came to Tracy's attention when he used his fingernails to slice open a man's throat, though Tracy could not prove it. Purdy worked for Diet Smith on the moon and used laser guns to mine gold. He conspired with an unnamed accomplice to steal the gold and sell it to Mr. Intro, and eventually went solo in this venture after he used the laser gun to kill his partner. Before Purdy could complete his transaction with Intro, Tracy caught up with him on the moon and subdued him by beating him to a bloody pulp. In desperation, Purdy committed suicide by running out into the extreme cold of the moon, where he was quick frozen in a standing position. Dr. Klippoff later claimed to revive Purdy from his deep freeze, but this was exposed as a hoax. In 2013 Purdy is shown to be alive and in the care of his sister Notta.
- Purple Cross Gang (also known as The Order of the Purple Cross) (1936) - A group of thieves and killers who had purple crosses tattooed on their tongues. Led by the man known as The Boss, they committed several violent crimes. The only survivor of the gang is Baldy Stark, who quits and takes an honest job for his daughter's sake shortly before the others' downfall, although he is later arrested.
- Putty Puss aka Harley Niav ("Vain" spelled backwards) (1986–1987, 1989–1990, 2011–2012) - A brilliant actor disfigured in a car "accident" caused by a jealous colleague. Underwent an experimental surgical technique that allowed his face to become like putty, able to become any person's likeness but sagging after one hour. He decided to become a bank robber, using his skills and his face to impersonate David Letterman, Ronald Reagan, Albert Einstein and even Tracy himself. Eventually captured, but has returned to plague Tracy several times.
- Queen of Diamonds aka Kimberly Mynes (2007) - A jewel thief who operated in Dick Tracy's city. She typically dressed like the Queen of Diamonds playing card, and she was especially skilled at hand-to-hand combat. Held Dick Tracy at gunpoint until he threw a (fake) diamond behind him off the roof toward the river. She leaped after it and plummeted into the working smokestack of a tugboat.
- Quiver Trembly (1984) - Daughter of Shaky, and partner of Angelica "Angeltop" Jones; stepsister of Breathless Mahoney.
- Red Bluff (1943) - Navy deserter killed by 88 Keyes. The discovery of his body by the police led to 88 Keyes' own death at the hands of Dick Tracy.
- Ribs Mocco (1931) - Big Boy's gang member. The first criminal, along with his associate Spike, to be arrested by Dick Tracy after becoming a policeman. He was a bane to Dick Tracy throughout the 1930s, not only in the weekly strips but also in the early Sunday editions as well. (The early Sunday editions had separate Dick Tracy stories from the weekly plot.) Mocco teamed with Stooge Viller to set up Dick Tracy, but failed. After Viller was arrested in 1933, Ribs fled town (and the comic strip). Appeared briefly during the big gangster meeting in the 1990 movie, and was referred to as "Mocca".
- Rhodent (1959) - Noted as one of the Tracy villains who openly acknowledged that he looked unusual. In the movie, he was one of the five gangsters killed by Flattop and Itchy at the beginning of the movie.
- Rod Bender (1966) - Appeared in a Dick Tracy mini-comic appearing in Reader's Digest as an advertisement for a shock absorber and car battery manufacturer. Bender was an underworld "torpedo" (killer) who with an accomplice tried to blow up Tracy's squad car but was captured. Bender's trademark is bending an automobile rod in his hands.
- Rono "Nails" Wolley (1939) - Conman/swindler who, with two accomplices, almost succeeded in killing accomplice Pop Warner's son and Jade the salesman. Wolley ended up being beaten up and captured by Dick Tracy.
- Rughead (1955) - A gang leader, marked by a perpetually sleepy-eyed look while wearing an ill-fitting obvious wig, who stole furs. Killed by ricochet bullet while shooting it out with a rival gang who wanted the $200,000.00 he was carrying.
- Sal Monella (2004) - Promoted a fake rock concert. When exposed, he tried to escape in back of a garbage truck but was followed by Detective Frisk. Shots were fired and the truck's contents were dumped into a garbage scow and then dumped into the bay. No trace of either was found except for one of Frisk's shoes. Declared missing March 9, 2004.
- Sam "The Lever" Doty (1937) - Ex-member of the Redrum gang and only member of the gang still in the slot machine racket. Kidnapped by The Blank, tied up and thrown out of a speeding car into police HQ. Tricked by Tracy into revealing that Blank's mug shot was in the police files.
- Scardol (1939) - Leader of a stolen car ring who killed three lawmen and tried to bury Dick Tracy under wet cement (but ended up under the concrete himself).
- Schultzie Innis (1937) - Former member of the Redrum gang of 1926. Killed by The Blank by being tossed out of an airplane. His body was found after it crashed through a farmhouse roof.
- Scorpio (1969) - Crime boss who had a "scorpion" outlined on his face. Fanatic believer in astrology.
- Selbert DePool ("Looped" spelled backwards) (1941) - Crazy killer who murdered his uncle so his aunt could inherit his money. Killed his aunt and tried to kill his second cousin's fiancée before going on the run and purchasing a tavern to lay low in Later killed a waitress at the tavern when she suspected his mental hospital past. Investigation of her death caused DePool to try to escape in a hijacked parade float; the part DePool was in hit an underpass and DePool was killed.
- Shaky Trembly (1944) - Extortionist who tried to use model Snowflake Falls to extort money from a banker. She broke his hand and tried to turn him over to the police, but he escaped and kidnapped her. He fractured her bones and nearly succeeded in freezing and drowning her. After stealing Vitamin Flintheart's fur coat, it caught fire. Shaky killed fireman O'Brien and tried to escape Dick Tracy. However, he only succeeded in being trapped in an ice coffin. His body was discovered in 1945 by stepdaughter Breathless Mahoney. His trademark was the continuous "shaking" of his body, but he paradoxically liked to ponder his thoughts while doing delicate tasks that demanded a steady hand such as building a ship in a bottle and practicing marksmanship targets. Father of Quiver Trembly and stepfather of Breathless Mahoney.
- Shaky Trembly gang (1944-1945) - Shaky had five gang members: two were killed while holding Police Chief Brandon and Pat Patton hostage; a gunman "Marty" was wounded and captured by Dick Tracy; the last two members were killed in a fire at their hideout: "Eddie" panicked and jumped from a third story window; the last one made it to the third floor landing but was killed; his badly burned body was recovered by fireman and Dick Tracy had Pat Patton check the fingerprints to make sure it was wasn't Shaky.
- Sharptop Jones - Sharptop was Flattop's twin brother and exact double except for a distinctive cowlick which made one strand of Sharptop's hair protrude straight upwards from the familiar flat cranium. Sharptop and Flattop were raised separately and had almost no contact with each other; whereas Flattop became a notorious criminal, Sharptop had a respected career as a college professor and refused to discuss his infamous brother, whom he claimed he barely knew. During a post-Gould continuity, Sharptop was apparently possessed by the spirit of his deceased brother, forcing Sharptop to assemble a gang of henchmen and commit a crime wave. During his criminal activities, Sharptop used hair oil to slick down his cowlick, thus becoming a double of Flattop. Tracy was able to arrest him after Sharptop apparently managed to overcome the supernatural possession and evict Flattop's soul from his body. The strip never established whether a genuine supernatural occurrence had taken place, and Tracy himself refused to comment on it, except to note that Sharptop's long respectable academic career would be taken into consideration by the district attorney.
- Shirtsleeve Kelton (1936–1937) - Small time politician and ward heeler with a shady reputation. Shot to death by a fellow criminal in self defense; was unmasked as the secret leader of The Purple Cross Gang.
- Shoulders (1946) - Extremely broad-shouldered handsome thug hired by Mrs. Mahoney to recover Shaky's money. He acquired a brush salesman's sample case and used this to pose as a traveling salesman. In the movie, was one of the five gangsters killed by Flattop and Itchy at the beginning of the movie.
- Short Circuit (1966) - Appeared in a Dick Tracy mini-comic advertisement for a shock absorber and car battery manufacturer. "Little person" diamond thief at a millionaire's ball whose plans were foiled by Tracy and Catchem.
- Shorty the Dip (1945) - Part of the Measles gang. Killed in an auto crash after Measles tried to kill Dick Tracy, who was trapped on the bumper of the gangster's car.
- Simon "Sweatbox" Baux (2013) - When Lake Freedom was drained on the site of a Japanese-American internment camp, a box is found with a confession by Stephen Baux to a 1947 murder. An accidental discovery by Spencer Toad revealed additional murder victims and the discovery of Stephen's brother, philanthropist Simon Baux, as a secret serial killer. While trying to escape from Tracy and Detective Ebony, Baux was killed when his car skidded on ice and hit a moving train head on. February 24, 2013. Nicknamed "Sweatbox" due to his continually sweating.
- Simon Little (1945) - Diamond cutter for Mr. Sparkle.
- Sketch Paree (1949) - Insane clothing designer responsible for the death of Talcum Freely, a rival clothing designer. Led Dick Tracy and Sam Catchem into a death trap in the river. Wore a sponge mask which he used to drown his victims. He also talked to a little doll named Babee. Later killed.
- Sleet (1948) - Featured the first appearance of Sam Catchem as Tracy's new partner. Slippery confidence woman from Boston, not pleased to know her "nemesis" Sam Catchem was working in her new home town, tried several times to have him killed. After long prison sentence, in 2021 she resurfaced as owner of an old-time supper club.
- Slick (2006) - Mr. Oily's lawyer who had a scam to steal gasoline. Unsuccessfully urged Oily to stick to white collar crime. Killed when he fell off power windmill.
- Slot Machine Ring (1958) - A group led by Charley Hardly and his sons Uno, Duo, Trey, and Quad with Uno as the field leader. They hired Popsie's Mother to buy Headache's slot machine factory. They eventually killed both Headache and Popsie's Mother, and were tracked down by the police. Duo, Trey and Quad were killed in a shootout and Charley died of a heart attack. Uno survived for a brief period, but eventually succumbed to his gunshot wounds in a hospital. The Ring's money was inherited by Charley's brother. It was stolen by The Rhodent and was later struck by a bolt of lightning which caused it to be fused into a solid piece of metal that was donated to the city. It is not clear if the Slot Machine Ring was connected to the Apparatus, but it is not unlikely.
- Sludge (2006) - Henchmen of Mr. Oily who captured Tracy and Lizz. Accidentally crashed into Oily's garage. Unknown if killed in the garage fire or arrested by the police.
- Snake Eyes (1992) - Formerly a gambling bigwig for Apparatus crime syndicate. After serving long prison term, was denied re-admittance as too violent for the "modern age" of crime. Plan to rob floating riverboat casino went awry, and he was killed when he fell on his own knife during a fight with Dick Tracy. His voice hissed like a snake.
- Snails (2001) - Overweight criminal mastermind. He first tricks two bank robbers into thinking he has followed them to find the proceeds of a bank robbery—in fact he stays in a hideout and at gunpoint forces them to run through a railing to their deaths in a street below. Tracy investigates but cannot charge Snails with any crime. Snails recruits five accomplices to rob an armored car; Snails takes the slowest taxi and causes traffic buildup but has not committed a crime, Tracy cannot arrest him but can only follow him. Snails causes an armored car crash in which two guards and all his accomplices are killed either in the crashes or by Snails himself. Snails gives himself away with his craving for snails where he is captured in a restaurant and the stolen cash recovered. Gimmick is his craving for snails and his saying "I'm slow but...".
- Snowflake Falls (1944) - Model drugged to be used by Shaky in a scheme to extort money from a banker. Married Vitamin Flintheart despite their 30-year age difference. Kidnapped, suffered fractured bones, and nearly froze to death after being tossed off of a pier by Shaky.
- Soapy Lava (1965) - A criminal associate of Mr. Bribery who was killed and his head added to Bribery grotesque collection of Heads. The Collection was found and exposed by Dick Tracy. (Lava was only one of two heads identified by name; the second was a missing Judge North who was secretly a member of "The Apparatus" (I.e Organized Crime) a third head was only identified as the brother of a man who headed a gang who took revenge on Bribery associate/headshrinker Nah Tay).
- Spaldoni aka George Bumpsted (1934) - Corrupt lawyer and Big Boy's mouthpiece. Murdered author Jean Penfield before she could expose his lucrative underworld connections, and framed Tess Trueheart for the crime. Made a last stand against Tracy in an abandoned refinery, and was subsequently killed by Tracy in a shootout; after his death it is revealed that his real name was George Bumstead; he is the brother of International Detective J. Scotland Bunstead. Appeared as a crime boss in the 1990 Dick Tracy movie played by James Caan, where he is known as "Spuds" Spaldoni: he refuses to submit to Caprice and dies by a car bomb.
- Sphinx (1951) - Accomplice of Crewy Lou, was rendered mute after drinking poison meant for one of his enemies. Aliases are "John Ren" and "Beaker".
- Spike (1931) - A Big Boy's gang thug. Arrested along with Ribs Mocco for payroll robbery.
- Splitface (1945) - Dick Tracy movie villain. A psychopath imprisoned for murder. He gets disfigured by an inmate's knife, hence the name. After being released, he intended to kill the fourteen members of the jury who sent him to prison. However, because of an extortionist "professor" who knew of his actions, Splitface only managed to kill two of the jury along with the "professor" and the mortician whom he stole the knives from before he kidnaps Tess Trueheart, with Junior Tracy leaving a trail for Tracy to follow and capture Splitface.
- SPLITSCREEN(1980)---Confidence man who was addicted to television--his eyes resembled giant TV screens. Got in on the ground floor of selling bootleg versions of popular movies---with his video store as a "front". VITAMIN FLINTHEART tipped Dick Tracy to his activities when they attempted to sell him movies HE owned sole rights to.

Deprived of television in prison,he had a complete breakdown and is currently a mental institution inmate.

- Spots (1960) - Always shown with spots in front of his face. Attempted to secure sums of money, first by fraudulent means that led him to commit murder and then by blackmail. Killed in street shootout with Tracy.
- Steve the Tramp (last name alternately given as Maddis and Brogan) aka Prisoner Number 27604 (1932–1934, 1941, 1986) - Started out as common thug guilty of assaults, prison escapes, and during Junior Tracy kidnapping killing a US mailman and a farmer he forced to run a police blockade. The Tramp tangled with Dick Tracy throughout 1933-1934 until he went back to prison in 1934 after being an enforcer for Larceny Lue's gang in which he killed Gang Bosses Jerry O'Mara and Mickey Dunn. After losing a leg and one eye he became a reformed man and was released in 1941 and opened up a fruit stand. He was framed by "Duke the Dip" for an armored car robbery, but was later freed by Tracy. It was later revealed that he was the second husband of Mary Steel, and the stepfather of John "Jackie" Steel Jr., aka Junior Tracy, explaining how the both of them ended up together in their first appearance in the strip {Junior's mother had run away from her husband to Brogan when he seemed to become a wealthy prospector; ironically it was Hank Steele who became wealthy while Steve became a tramp!}. In the film from 1990 he is beaten up by Tracy to save The Kid (Junior).
- Stephen Baux (2013) - Baseball player who falsely confessed to a murder his brother committed, but was killed in jail before he could be tried.
- Stooge Viller (1933, 1939) - Pickpocket who almost succeeded in framing Dick Tracy for a crime. Also a vehicle hijacker and prison escapee who teamed up with Steve the Tramp. He killed Blind Hank Steele Sr. who was trying to protect his son John "Jackie" Steele Jr. (a.k.a. Junior Tracy). He was finally captured by Dick Tracy in late 1933. After getting out of prison in 1939, he started more trouble with Tracy as well, as he tried in vain to get to know his little daughter Binnie Viller. After trying to kill Tracy, Stooge was accidentally shot by Binnie, later on dying in the hospital, but not before coming to an understanding with Tracy and asking him to watch over his daughter. Based on Edward G. Robinson. In the 1990 film, was one of the five gangsters killed by Flattop and Itchy at the beginning of the movie.
- Strip Gear (1966) - Appeared in a Dick Tracy mini-comic advertisement for a shock absorber and car battery manufacturer. "Strip" Gear was an ex-dancer and armored car hijacker whose plans were foiled by Tracy and Chatchem.
- Stud Bronzen (1937) - The only member of the Redrum gang not killed or turned over to the police by The Blank. Supposedly got out of the rackets, but actually operated a human smuggling ring under the cover of a salvage operation. Bronzen initially escaped to continue his criminal activity, but Tracy managed to track him down and kill him in a gun battle.
- Suds - Former member of the Bird Gang turned laundry owner. Murdered for squealing by his old partners Jay Hawk, Buzzard and Coot after their escape from prison.
- Sugar (1941) - Girlfriend of Duke the Dip. While escaping from the police, she died in a car accident.
- Texie Garcia (1931) - Big Boy's mistress/moll. Left holding the bag when Big Boy temporarily left town to get clear of Tracy's gangbusting activities. Later seen helping Dan "The Squealer" Mucelli operate the city's dope business. Although rumored to be based on Texas Guinan, Gould himself said he created her as a "dead ringer for actress Dolores del Río." Cameo appearance in the 1990 film Dick Tracy at the big gangster meeting, portrayed by Catherine O'Hara.
- Thunderchild (2012) - A professional wrestler who committed grand larceny by stealing a load of charity money. Attacked by the Mole, Dick Tracy, and former wrestler "Crazy King".
- Tiger Lilly (1942) - Head of a gang that staged real disasters to record the sound effects. After unsuccessfully trying to kill Dick Tracy and a game warden, the gang tried to escape down a river but were trapped and captured when their raft ran against the water intake tunnel of a dam.
- Tip (1940) - St. Bernard owned by Jerome Trohs and Mamma. After his capture by Dick Tracy, Jerome Trohs seized a bag of money and "rode" his dog in order to escape.
- Togo (1942) - Stereotypical Japanese spy, associate of Pruneface. He was captured by Dick Tracy.
- Tommy McConny (1962) alias "George Pardy" - In 1920 he killed Police Chief Moyson; tried and sentenced to be hanged he escaped and was a fugitive for 40 years. Exposed after the death of Mary Steele, he again tried to escape arrest by climbing out a window but was accidentally strangled by ivy vines.
- Tonsils (1952) - Singer and associate of Mr. Crime who shot and wounded Dick Tracy on July 30, 1952. Killed when he was thrown by Panda into a barracuda pool on August 20, 1952. Remains found by Dick Tracy.
- Trinka (1965) - Enemy pilot of Von Rhino spy ring; intercepted famed aviatrix Lita Flight July 1, 1937 in the mid-Pacific; went off course and was trapped in the Arctic Circle and froze to death; body found in an ice coffin in 1965. Tracy intercepts the last two members of the Von Rhino spy ring who are also trying to find the body-one is killed and the other is wounded and arrested.
- "Truffa" Dolan (1933) - Better known as "Confidence" Dolan. Small time hood who lost $10,000.00 of crime lord Big Boy's money; made frantic, criminal attempts to replace it. Captured alive, placed in Witness Protection in return for information on Jimmy White,
- Tulza Tuzon aka Haf-and-Haf (1966–1967, 1978, 1990) - Born in 1923. A truck driver who, due to an accident in 1943, had half of his face scarred by acid similar to the Batman villain Two-Face. Later became a circus "freak". Had a scam in which dozens of trained crows would steal handbags. Murdered his wife in order to marry his lover, circus trapeze artist Zelda the Great. When Zelda discovered that Tulza had indeed killed, rather than divorced, his first wife, her threats to go the police led Tulza to attempt her murder, from which Dick Tracy rescued her. The fleeing Tulza attempted to romance the blind dowager Kora Steel (who had let her husband's body rot in a hidden room in order to cheat the inheritance tax) in order to murder her and inherit her money, but Tracy thwarted him again. Years later, Tulza, released from prison after undergoing plastic surgery at the hands of Dr. Will Carver, attempted once again to kill Zelda by means of a poisonous snake, for which Tracy provided the antidote. In revenge, Zelda hurled acid in Tulza's face, restoring his disfigurement. Returned in 1990---attempted to sabotage movie based on Dick Tracy's life (Dick starred as himself); angered that he was not one of the villains chosen for the movie.
- T.V. Wiggles (1950) - A disgraced former professional wrestler who ran a protection racket that extorted local businesses. If they didn't pay up, his crew would destroy their TVs with corn syrup. Wiggles tried to kill the young Sparkle Plenty after an extortion plot on Vitamin Flintheart fell apart. Wiggles was killed on November 12, 1950, during a bloody fight with Dick Tracy.
- Twitchell "Twitchy" Oliver (1983) - Itchy Oliver's equally nasty younger brother, who constantly twitched as a result of a nervous tic. Masterminded scheme with the late B-B Eyes' younger brother B.D. Eyes to scare Stephanie Queen, a horror author, out of the same house wherein Itchy met his fate in order to find $100,000 which their older brothers hid in the house years earlier.
- Ugly Christine (Packet) (1965) - Sister and accomplice of Mr. Bribery. Captured after she tried to kill Dick Tracy. Despite Tracy and Lizz's efforts to stop her, Ugly Christine threw herself from a magnetic police Space Coupe into a fiery chimney and was killed.
- Uno Hardly (1958) - The field leader of The Slot Machine Ring, which he operated with the aid of his brothers under the supervision of their father Charley. Uno typically smoked a pipe and was often referred to as "Number 1". While the Hardly brothers closely resembled each other physically, Uno could usually be identified by his diamond-patterned coat.
- Warlock (1972) - Leader of gang that used witchcraft as a scare tactic. Killed by his own gang in fight over buried treasure.
- Wetwash Wally (1945) - Laundry truck driver who tried to separate Breathless Mahoney from her money after she hid it in his truck. Breathless knocked him out and met B.O. Plenty. Wally was revived and picked up by Pat Patton.
- Whip Chute (1939) - Criminal who tried to escape by climbing down a theater marquee sign which broke under his weight and killed him. July 2, 1939
- William "Broadway Bates (1932, 2013) - Conman; kidnapper and forger-he resembles his brother "Oswald Cobblepot" aka The Penguin except he wears a bowler hat instead of a tophat.
- William Millyon aka "Willie the Fifth" (1959, 2011) - Brother of Halffa Millyon, whose death at the hands of Lizz he seeks to avenge. Willie the Fifth's nickname was derived from his use of the legal tactic of employing the Fifth Amendment, which gives Americans the right to refuse to speak if they believe that their response might tend to incriminate themselves. Fifth had the habit of saying "I refuse to answer" even when asked a harmless question. He claimed to have learned this tactic from Flyface, his "legal advisor", whose presence he demands even at inconvenient times. Millyon was an expensively dressed, cigar-loving criminal who often wears a hat pulled down over his eyes except while in disguise. He owned a bar that doubled as his headquarters, from which he operated the criminal activity in the city that had previously been overseen by Mr. Crime and Odds Zonn. He and Flyface escape prison and flee to Hawaii after their initial arrest but vanish and are presumed killed after being caught in a tidal wave zone.
- Wolley (1939) - Nickname "Nails". Tough gangleader who ran stolen jewelry racket and lived in luxury. Killed in gunfight with Dick Tracy.
- Wormy Marrons (1949–1950, 1981, 2011) - One of the most grotesque villains in the entire history of the strip, Wormy's face looked as if it was made of live earthworms. He chained Dick Tracy to the back of his car and drove at top speed down a highway, intending to drag Tracy to death, but merely injured him.
- X-Ray (1947) - Comic relief henchman in the Dick Tracy movie Dick Tracy Meets Gruesome. Ultimately the only survivor of Gruesome's gang, X-Ray is captured by Dick Tracy. Played by Skelton Knaggs.
- Yogee Yamma (1940) - Con man who used gas to hypnotize widows for contents of their safes. Kidnapped Professor Roloc Bard to make the gas. Bard was rescued by Dick Tracy and Yamma was accidentally burned alive by the gas while drunk.
- Zero Naught (1977) - Felon trapped in walk-in refrigerator who tried to shoot it out with the police - first with a luger, then with a little .22 pistol stolen from Mrs. Aigg. Tried to kill Dick Tracy, but was killed when the small gun misfired. (June 19, 1977)
- Zolla (1943) - One of three blackmarketers who hired Flattop to kill Dick Tracy (the other two were not named). All three ended up captured by Dick Tracy instead and lost their $55,000 as well.
- Zora Arson (1934) (see Arsons, The above) - Sister of Boris Arson and partner of Cutie Diamond in bank robberies and police killings. Killed by Dick Tracy and a posse at Diamond's hideout.

== Archie tie-ins ==
In the 1970s, Archie's TV Funnies had cartoon "shorts" of Dick Tracy episodes. Guest villains included B.B. Eyes; The Brow; 88 Keys; the Mole; Mumbles; Pearshape Tone; Shaky; Shoulders; Sketch Paree. Cameos included appearances by Tess Trueheart, Moon Maid, B.O. Plenty, Mrs. Van Hoosen, Lizz Grove, Sam Catchem and Chief Patton. Likewise, an episode (1/8) of the Josie and the Pussycats cartoon series had an episode in which the musicians are chased by a "Blank" (faceless) criminal called the Mastermind.
