= Dick Tracy (radio series) =

American radio drama (1934–1948)

- Genre: Detective radio drama
- Running time: 15 minutes, 30 minutes
- Country of origin: United States
- Language(s): English
- Home station: Mutual Broadcasting System
- Syndicates: NBC Radio; CBS Radio; ABC Radio
- Starring: Bob Burlen; Barry Thomson; Ned Wever; Matt Crowley; Walter Kinsella; Helen Lewis; Andy Donnelly
- Announcer: Ed Herlihy; Dan Seymour
- Written by: Irwin Shaw, others
- Directed by: Mitchell Grayson, Charles Powers, Bob White
- Original release: 1934 – 1948
- Opening theme: Toot, Toot, Tootsie
- Sponsored by: Sterling Products, Quaker Oats, Tootsie Roll

Dick Tracy was an American detective radio drama series based on the popularity of the newspaper comic strip Dick Tracy by Chester Gould.

== History ==
The show first aired in 1934 for the NBC Radio New England region. Himan Brown, then still at college, arranged the radio rights for the comic strip.

On February 4, 1935, it was picked up by CBS Radio, airing in 15 minute episodes four times a week. Returning next season it aired on Mutual Broadcasting System from September 30, 1935 to March 24, 1937. From April 29, 1939, "Dick Tracy" became a half-hour-long prime time radio serial, airing at 5:00 pm.

When the USA got involved in the Second World War, the show was temporarily cancelled. ABC Blue Network picked it up again from March 15, 1943 to July 16, 1948 and broadcast it on Saturdays. Around this time it was sponsored by Tootsie Rolls, so the music theme was changed to "Toot, Toot Tootsie". The musical arrangements were composed by Ray Carter.

== Cast ==
The show was directed by Mitchell Grayson, Charles Powers and Bob White. At Mutual, Bill McClintock did the sound effects. At NBC, Keene Crockett did this job. During its run on ABC, Walt McDonough and Al Finelli were hired for this task.

- Dick Tracy – Bob Burlen, Barry Thompson, Ned Wever, Matt Crowley
- Pat Patton – Walter Kinsella
- Tess Trueheart – Helen Lewis
- Junior Tracy – Andy Donnelly, Jackie Kelk
- Police Chief Brandon – Howard Smith
- Tania – Beatrice Pons

== Popularity ==
Like many children's radio shows at the time, Dick Tracy had its own fan club, which offered premiums.

== Significant events ==
The beginning of the May 1, 1945 episode ("The Case of the Empty Safe") was interrupted on the Blue Network for a special news flash relating that Adolf Hitler had "died of a stroke." Copies of this episode, complete with the mistaken news flash—Hitler had committed suicide the day before, not died of a stroke—still exist today. (See: Death of Adolf Hitler.)

On July 8, 1945, during a New York newspaper deliverers' strike, New York mayor Fiorello H. La Guardia read a complete Dick Tracy strip over the radio.

== Parodies ==
On Feb.15, 1945, Command Performance broadcast the musical comedy Dick Tracy in B-Flat with Bing Crosby as Tracy, Bob Hope as Flattop, and Dinah Shore as Tess Trueheart. Dick Tracy's wedding was repeatedly interrupted as Tracy chased one villain after another. In the strip, his marriage wasn't until 1950, and his honeymoon was disrupted by his going after Wormy.
