= Dick Tracy (character) =

Hero of the Dick Tracy comic strip

- Dick Tracy, as he first appeared. Art by Chester Gould.

Publication information
- Publisher: Chicago Tribune New York News Syndicate
- First appearance: "Dick Tracy" (October 4, 1931)
- Created by: Chester Gould

In-story information
- Partnerships: Little Orphan Annie; Moon Maid; Tess Trueheart; Daddy Warbucks
- Abilities: Genius-level intellect; Expert detective; Expert marksman; Proficient hand-to-hand combatant

Dick Tracy is a fictional police detective in the American comic strip Dick Tracy created by Chester Gould in 1931. Tracy is a tough and intelligent detective who uses forensic science, advanced gadgetry, and wits in his relentless pursuit of criminals.

The Dick Tracy comic strip made its premiere on October 4, 1931, in the Detroit Mirror. The strip was distributed by Chicago Tribune New York News Syndicate. Chester Gould both drew and wrote the comic strip until 1977. Since then other writers and artists have continued to produce the strip, which is still running in newspapers to this day.

The character of Dick Tracy has been featured in the 1930s–1940s radio series Dick Tracy, with Tracy voiced by Bob Burlen, Barry Thompson, Ned Wever and Matt Crowley.

The character of Dick Tracy has been featured in a number of films including, from 1990, Dick Tracy, which starred Warren Beatty as the titular character.
