= Walter Kinsella (actor) =

American actor (1900–1975)

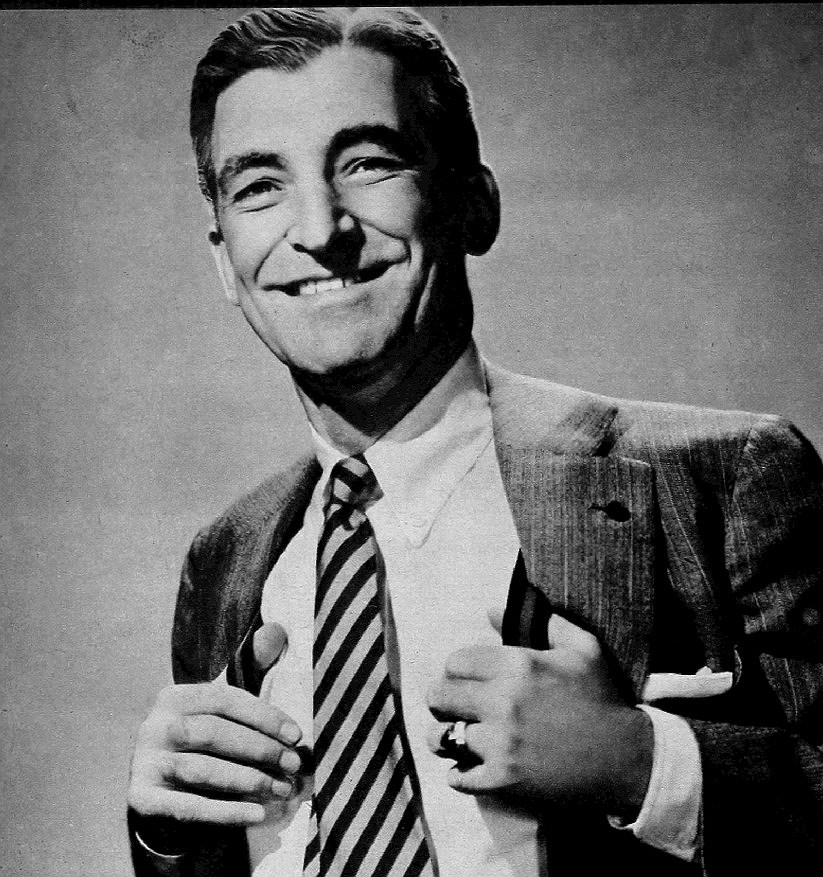
Kinsella as Patrick Joseph Murphy in 1943

Walter Kinsella (born August 16, 1900, in New York City, died May 11, 1975, in Englewood, New Jersey) was an American theater, television and radio actor.

In his youth, Kinsella was active as a middle-distance runner in track events, winning more than 120 prizes in competition sponsored by the Amateur Athletic Union.

In the 1920s, he was featured in advertisements for Arrow collars.

Kinsella's first Broadway stage appearance was in 1924, in What Price Glory? His other Broadway credits included Blessed Event, Arrest That Woman, and Juno.

Kinsella's roles on radio programs included:

Program	Role
Abie's Irish Rose	Patrick Murphy
Dick Tracy	Junior Tracy; Pat Patton
The Fresh Up Show	Irish policeman Doc Fickett
Joe and Mabel	Mike
Leave It to Mike	Mike McNally
Mr. and Mrs. North	Sergeant Mullins
Mr. District Attorney	Harrington
Paging Mike McNally	Mike McNally
Peewee and Windy	Windy

He also was a regular cast member of The Johnny Morgan Show and That's My Pop.

Kinsella's most noted television role was that of Happy McMann in NBC's detective drama Martin Kane, Private Eye. He also was the announcer for the Kane program. He made a guest appearance on Perry Mason in 1961 as defendant Carter Gilman in "The Case of the Duplicate Daughter."

Kinsella was married and had a son and a daughter.

== Selected filmography ==
- Alfred Hitchcock Presents (1961) (Season 6 Episode 30: "You Can't Trust a Man") as Lieutenant
- Alfred Hitchcock Presents (1962) (Season 7 Episode 25: "The Last Remains") as Lieutenant Morgan
- Alfred Hitchcock Presents (1962) (Season 7 Episode 31: "Most Likely to Succeed") as Attorney Frank Anderson
