= Moon Maid (comics) =

Publication information
- Publisher: Tribune Media Services
- First appearance: 1964
- Created by: Chester Gould

In-story information
- Team affiliations: Dick Tracy

Moon Maid is a fictional alien character from the Dick Tracy comic strip, created in 1964 by Chester Gould.

== Background ==
Gould, hoping to keep the strip evolving with the times, slowly began changing the strip from a crime drama into one whose primary focus was science fiction. Tracy had always been equipped with the latest, most up-to-date police equipment, including forensic science, but with the introduction into the strip of eccentric industrialist Diet Smith as Tracy's friend in the 1940s, Tracy began to use devices such as the two-way wrist radio, and later the two-way wrist TV.

The logical extension of this in Gould's mind was the introduction of space travel. Smith invented the magnetic-powered Space Coupe. During 1963, Smith and another explorer landed on the moon three times to collect rock and soil samples. During the last visit they both leave the Space Coupe unattended. While returning to Earth they found a stow away on board, this was Moon Maid. Moon Maid had her debut to the world on January 1, 1964. The Moon race looked like Caucasian humans except for having abnormally large eyes and giraffe-like horns on their foreheads. Moon Maid's first months on earth were chaotic, she could not speak earth language and her moon powers disrupted radar and television broadcasts as well as fried camera film. Her exploits continued with Junior falling in love with her and in a climatic moment this came to a head when it was revealed that Smith intended to take Moon Maid home. On April 7th, 1964 junior professes his love for Moon Maid and she decides to stay on earth with Junior.

When the impending 1969 NASA Apollo 11 Moon landing threatened to make the preceding Moon stories look silly, Gould chose to return to the material that made the Dick Tracy strip famous: Earthbound crime. The strip made one oblique reference to the Apollo 11 landing shortly after its completion, with Diet Smith commenting about some "equipment left behind" on the Moon (in a caption above a panel showing the abandoned Lunar Module).

After Apollo 11, Moon Maid and Honeymoon remained on Earth as wife and daughter of Tracy's adopted son Dick Tracy, Junior. All references to their selenic origin were phased out, with Moon Maid identified solely as "Junior's wife". Both characters continued to appear sporadically, in greatly reduced roles, until Moon Maid's eventual demise.

When Joe Staton and Mike Curtis took over the comic strip in 2011, they inaugurated a period in which many characters of the 1940s were reintroduced, including the Lunarian theme and the seeming reappearance of Moon Maid.

== Fictional character biography ==
Moon Maid was the daughter of the Moon's supreme ruler, a male humanoid who was always identified as "the Governor of the Moon". It is not clear whether he was democratically elected, or some form of hereditary ruler. She served as a liaison between her race and the humans. She and her family became one of the strip's primary focuses for several years.

Moon Maid eventually married Junior, the now-adult adopted son of Dick Tracy. Her father the Governor resented this marriage. Eventually, Moon Maid became pregnant by Junior. Her father was anxious that the child be born on the Moon, so as to be legally a Moon denizen. The pregnant Moon Maid, Junior, and the Governor and his wife were all aboard a Space Coupe when Moon Maid gave birth at precisely the midpoint in space between Earth and the Moon.

The child, a girl, was named Honeymoon Tracy and had slightly over-large eyes, and two prominent tufts of hair on her forehead in the position corresponding to Moon Maid's horns; we are never told what lies beneath those tufts. The daughter also demonstrated a magnetic ability to attract small metal objects to her hands; this talent never played an important role in the strip.

During this period, Dick Tracy himself had many adventures on the Moon, notably solving a murder case involving a man named Purdy Fallar who kept two of his fingernails extra-long, claiming they were for harvesting the meat of Giant Escargot, a species of gigantic Moon snails, prized on Earth as delicacies. In reality he used his sharpened fingernails as throat-slashing weapons.

=== Later years ===
Soon after Rick Fletcher and Max Collins took over the strip in 1978, Moon Maid was murdered accidentally by a man named "Little" Littel in an attempt to kill Tracy with a car bomb while trying to collect on a million dollar open contract on Tracy's head by elderly crime lord "Big Boy" Caprice. Littel would later be killed, himself, in an explosion when Junior Tracy goes to his shop looking for revenge on his wife's murder.

Although Honeymoon Tracy survived—though all references to her Moon heritage were forgotten—it was understood that this moment represented the termination of the strip's Moon years.

These themes returned to prominence in the 2010s. In August 2012 it was revealed (as Junior went to put flowers on her grave, in the anniversary of her death) that Moon Maid's name was "Mysta" (a reference to 1940s comic character Mysta of the Moon). Shortly after, a female vigilante wearing a mask but sporting antennae and powers similar to Moon Maid's stopped a mugging, an act that was covered by a reporter; this led to tensions in the Tracy family, who were positive that Moon Maid had died. She was mentioned as continuing to fight crime; however, one night she vandalized Moon Maid's gravestone, claiming that it was a lie and that she was alive. She also displayed a desire to return with her family, i.e. Junior and Honeymoon, to the Moon. It was gradually revealed that she was in the care of a Dr. S. Tim Sail, an associate of Dr. Zy Gote (a geneticist who had previously claimed to have cloned the notorious criminal Mumbles, which eventually turned out to be a hoax).

Things came to head in the strips around September and October 2013, in which it was revealed that this Moon Maid is, in fact, an artificial chimera who via a combination of advanced plastic surgery (complete with solar cell horns that allowed her to mimic Moon Maid's powers), Lunarian DNA grafting, and "reprogramming" through brainwashing techniques was made to believe that she was the real Moon Maid as part of a plan to steal the Space Coupe. She was, in fact, Glenna Ermine (a minor character of the strip in the 1960s); while accepting that she was not the original Moon Maid, she nonetheless refused an offer by Diet Smith to return her to Glenna's original appearance, taking on the identity of "Mysta Chimera". Diet Smith took the role of her guardian and father-figure, and she lives in an apartment in his combined corporate headquarters and factory.

The new Moon Maid has been occupied since in trying to reintegrate herself into the world and has maintained an amicable relationship with the Tracy family (especially Honeymoon, who feels that they share a common Lunarian heritage). Recently, it has been noticed by Smith that her Lunarian DNA has begun to evolve (to the point that she is developing natural powers). This was recently followed by the discovery that Honeymoon has been developing Lunarian antennae and some Lunarian abilities, signs that her own half-Lunarian ancestry is developing.

A story in 2015 featured a crossover in which Honeymoon Tracy met Little Orphan Annie.
