= Pruneface =

Publication information
- Publisher: Tribune Content Agency
- First appearance: September 4, 1942
- Created by: Chester Gould

In-story information
- Partnerships: Mrs. Ana Pruneface (Wife), The Brow
- Supporting character of: Dick Tracy
- Notable aliases: Boche
- Abilities: High Intelligence

Pruneface is a fictional character in the long-running comic strip Dick Tracy, drawn by cartoonist Chester Gould. He is one of the series' main villains and notable for his wrinkly face despite being a young man.

== Fictional character biography ==
Pruneface's surname is Boche, a typically Dickensian-style naming of a character by Gould, since "Boche" is a French derogatory term for "German". He is a brilliant industrial engineer with a horribly deformed face. He sells out to the Nazis and is involved in espionage against the United States, as well as the development of nerve gas.

Pruneface first appeared (and apparently died) in 1942, having nearly frozen to death due to exposure during a shootout with the police. The character was revived in 1983. The 1983 story explains that he had been used in an early cryogenics experiment by Dr. Kryos Freezdrei and is reanimated using modern medicine. Freezdrei uses Pruneface's revival as a publicity stunt, however, to advertise the services of his cryogenics institute to the wealthy and gullible, whom the doctor and Pruneface plan to bilk for millions which would go towards funding neo-Nazi groups. This storyline ends with the bombing of the institute, Freezdrei's apparent death and Pruneface's disappearance, all at the hands of a Mossad agent. A cryogenics tube containing the frozen body of Adolf Hitler can be seen in the background as a fire destroys both him and the institute.

A later story arc explains, mostly through an extended flashback, that prior to his first meeting with Tracy, Pruneface led an espionage ring for the Axis powers to acquire a new secret formula for the deadly Xylon bomb, a non-radioactive explosive capable of devastating 10 city blocks. Xylon was developed by Professor Roloc Bard, a mad scientist who was taken hostage by a fake swami named Yogee Yammi during an earlier storyline of the 1940s. The ring consisted of Pruneface (hidden from the readers, going by Boche until halfway through the storyline) and his wife, Mrs. Pruneface, Shaky Trembly, Flattop Jones and his gang, and Frieda Smith (the professor's love interest and a secret Bundist). Pruneface kidnaps Bard and forces him to build several of the bombs, all of which but one is seized by Tracy and FBI agent Jim Trailer, hence the reason for the story being "suppressed" during the actual war. Returning to the present, de-classified documents on the Xylon case show that the case was still unsolved and that one final bomb was still out there, as potent and deadly as ever. This leads Tracy, Wendy Wichel and FBI Agent Jim Trailer to finding the last bomb hidden 10 blocks away from the Oval Office in an elderly Frieda Smith's basement. Right after she is arrested by Tracy and Jim Trailer, the bomb is defused. Her empty house soon after receives a telephone call from Pruneface to set the bomb off, causing him and Dr. Freezdrei to change their plans and go back into hiding.

Pruneface and Freezdrei would resurface and terrorized Dick Tracy's hometown with a product-tampering scheme that rendered Tracy's wife Tess blind; along with large portions of the town. Nazi sympathizers working in supermarket warehouses co-operated in poisoning instant coffee, which was sold widely. Freezdrei had invented the concoction, and only he knew the antidote. A masked man named "Captain Cure" would break into local TV programming and demand huge ransom money to prevent further outbreaks.

Tracy and the FBI traced the broadcasts to an underground hideout, where Freezdrei was crushed underneath heavy machinery. Pruneface was tricked into thinking he had been dosed with the deadly formula and he revealed the antidote.

Pruneface made one final reappearance in 1999, being held in a Mossad prison. He was the target of a liberation attempt by his granddaughter Prunella and great-granddaughter Prune Hilda, but the plan failed at the last second, and Pruneface was sent plunging to his death from a mountain gondola. His final words were "Sieg Heil".

== In other media ==
Pruneface is a featured villain in The Dick Tracy Show, a syndicated animated children's program which aired in the 1960s. He is voiced by either Mel Blanc or Paul Frees, and his vocal characterization is modeled after that of Boris Karloff. His complexion is lavender, lending him the color and wrinkled look of an actual prune. He is nearly always partnered with Itchy Oliver.

As The Dick Tracy Show was produced by UPA, which also produced the original Mr. Magoo cartoons, Pruneface appeared as the primary villain in an episode of The Famous Adventures of Mr. Magoo. In this Tracy/Magoo crossover episode entitled, "Dick Tracy and the Mob", Pruneface is depicted as the chairman of a mob organization, the other board members consisting of fellow Tracy villains Flattop, Ichy Oliver, the Brow, Mumbles, the Mole, and Oodles.

The character also makes a brief appearance in the 1990 film adaptation of Dick Tracy, in which he is portrayed by R. G. Armstrong. In this adaptation, he is an American mobster, operating in Tracy's city, who accepts Big Boy Caprice as his superior. He is eventually gunned down by the Blank.

In Kyle Baker's graphic novels that served as prequels to the movie, Pruneface's real name is given as Lorenzo Prunesti.

In the 1943 Looney Tunes cartoon short Porky Pig's Feat by Frank Tashlin, Daffy Duck confronts the manager of the Broken Arms Hotel, pretending to be intimidated by something he said. Daffy moves closer to his face so intensely that it is pushed inward, making it resemble a prune. Daffy, noticing this, says to the audience, "Hey, look! A Dick Tracy character: Pruneface!" Another Looney Tunes short, 1946's The Great Piggy Bank Robbery by Bob Clampett, has Daffy (as "Duck Twacy") encountering a pack of Dick Tracy-style villains, including an obvious Pruneface parody called "Pickle Puss".

Pruneface appears in Jason Yungbluth's 2002 graphic novel Weapon Brown, which re-imagines many syndicated comic strip characters in a post-apocalyptic setting, as a member of the Syndicate, a group of crime lords and scientists ruling over a post-apocalyptic America. The group also consists of "Chairman Horns" (the Pointy-Haired Boss from Dilbert), Mary Worth, Uncle Duke from Doonsbury, and (until Horns brutally kills him) Mr. Dithers from Blondie.

Pruneface, alongside the Brow, is one of the antagonists in Dick Tracy Forever.
