= Flattop (Dick Tracy villain) =

- Art by Chester Gould

Publication information
- Publisher: Tribune Media Services
- First appearance: December 21, 1943
- Created by: Chester Gould

In-story information
- Abilities: Master Marksman

Flattop Jones, Sr. is a fictional villain created by Chester Gould for the Dick Tracy comic strip. His nickname comes from his large head that is perfectly flat on the top.

== Background of fictional character ==
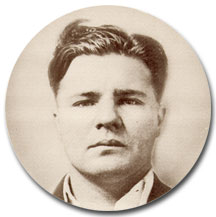
Charles Arthur "Pretty Boy" Floyd. Photo from the FBI files.

Gould revealed little about Flattop's personal life in the comic strip, but the background references that he did give the character share similarities to real-life Depression-era gangster Pretty Boy Floyd. For example, Flattop claims in the strip to be a freelance hitman from "Crookston Hills", a parody version of Floyd's hometown of Cookson Hills in Oklahoma. The comic strip also references Flattop's involvement in the "Kansas City Massacre," a 1933 incident in which Floyd was alleged to have been involved.

== Appearances in the comic strip ==
Gould's character leads a gang of three hoods and is known as an "ace killer" in one newspaper headline shown in the comic strip (having committed five murders). In the storyline in which Flattop is the featured villain, black marketeers hire him to eliminate Dick Tracy for a fee of $5,000: five times his regular rate.

Flattop proves his value by quickly orchestrating a successful setup involving an argument over money to capture Tracy in the killer's car, to be transported somewhere where he can be murdered undisturbed. Fortunately for Tracy, Flattop stops just short of doing the deed when he realizes that if his employers are willing to pay such a high price for Tracy's death, then they would surely be desperate enough to pay much more. As such, Flattop decides to blackmail his employers for an additional $50,000, lest he release the detective with the information Tracy needs to arrest them.

Hiding in a boarding room while the transaction is completed, Tracy learns that a resident living with her mother downstairs is a WAC who is learning Morse code. Taking advantage of an available piano in the room, he plays it and stamps on the floor in code as if keeping time to his music, hoping that the WAC below, Margie Elong, will recognize the call for help. Sure enough, Elong and her mother get the message and alert the police.

However, even as Tracy's partner, Pat Patton, is preparing for a rescue; Flattop, having closed his blackmail deal, prepares to shoot Tracy while he is surrounded by his henchmen. On Flattop's count of three, Tracy interrupts the assassination by lunging at the killer and wrestles for his gun. In the struggle, Tracy manages to kill a henchman, "Machine Gun" Eddie, with a Tommy gun, using it to kill the rest of Flattop's gang even as the police were storming the hideout. While the police tend to Tracy, the detective suggests that it be publicly announced that he was found dead, anticipating that Flattop's employers would contact the killer soon afterward. The black marketeers take the bait, call Flattop's number to invite him for a celebration and the police quickly arrive to arrest the lot of them.

However, Flattop escapes and becomes a hunted fugitive hampered by his extremely distinctive appearance. This leads to a long chase, during which Flattop stays in a boarding house while being extorted by the crooked child, Bud Jenkins, who is hiding him. The child drowns in a lake while skating with expensive new skates he buys with the blackmail money. This leads Tracy to the boarding house, forcing Flattop to flee. In a comic relief episode Flattop decides to hide his $50,000 in an old family album that he has hollowed out, as he is afraid that if he goes out with this much money he might be mugged; when Tracy visits the boarding house to question the dead boy's mother about her son flashing $50 bills around town, a reporter in need of a good picture of the deceased finds the money in the album.

When questioned, the mother realizes that the money could only have come from her roomer, forcing Flattop to flee the scene just as Tracy storms the room. This begins a chase sequence that lasts for six months beginning at the end of 1943. First, Flattop hides in a chimney and is stung by bees in a hive that he disturbs there. Then, slipping away stung and covered in honey, Flattop forces a street hawker selling gasoline as fraudulent cleaning fluid to use it to clean him, then murders the hawker to fake his own death and to steal his victim's war bonds. Eventually, Flattop hides out in a hotel, but the war bonds blow out a window and betray his location. In desperation as the police officer reports this to headquarters, he hides in the room of Vitamin Flintheart, an aging ham actor.

After attempting to explain his trespass, Flattop assaults Flintheart and uses his makeup supplies for a disguise. Tracy, Patton and Flintheart continue the search and battle Flattop after almost being fooled by a child to whom Flattop had passed off his disguise in hopes of making him a decoy. Flattop is severely wounded, but is successfully treated in custody.

Loath to let Flattop slip into oblivion, Gould managed to find a way to continue the story. The comic strip details Flattop's escape from custody, the taking of Flintheart hostage, and his hiding in the harbor area. Eventually, on May 14, 1944, Flattop is drowned attempting to flee Tracy, after getting trapped between two struts of a replica of the Santa Maria.

In the original story, comic relief is afforded by Vitamin Flintheart, who cons Officer Murphy and then Flattop into buying him vitamin pills and, when asked to repay, always answers, "Charge it". More relief is afforded by Flintheart who, while trapped on the Santa Maria replica, claims he cannot swim since he fell into his aunt's lily pond at a tender age.

In a 1986 storyline, reporter Wendy Wichel approaches Dick Tracy with new information concerning Flattop and an incident in World War II which was kept secret and in which Tracy was involved. Before Flattop encountered Tracy in 1944, Flattop was hired by the Nazi spy Boche, a.k.a. Pruneface, to kidnap FBI Agent Jim Trailer, a close friend of Dick Tracy's, and a scientist Trailer and Tracy were protecting: Professor Roloc Bard. Flattop's instructions were to kill Trailer and hand the professor over to Pruneface. Bard warned Flattop that he will be shipped overseas to make deadly weapons for the Axis cause, which caused Flattop to double-cross Pruneface and auction Bard and Trailer off to the highest bidder. Authorities in Washington, DC, ostensibly participating in the auction, authorized Tracy to negotiate while they traced Flattop's call. Tracy and his partner, Pat Patton, broke into Flattop's hideout and freed Trailer, while Flattop escaped with the Professor. Flattop tied Bard up in the same replica of the Santa Maria where he would later drown. Flattop's last appearance in this storyline was his meeting with Pruneface to collect his $50,000 and tell him where to find Bard. Pruneface swore that he would kill Flattop if he ever dared to betray him again.

== Characters created because of Flattop ==
As a response to Flattop's popularity, Gould created a large family for the character, most of whom were also equally bizarre hardened criminals. These included:

- Flattop Jr. – The son of Flattop, an engineering genius who had customized his car into an arsenal of equipment designed to keep him ahead of the law. His accomplice during his crime wave was Joe Period, who Flattop Jr. left to be captured by Dick Tracy and partner Sam Catchem. Flattop Jr. was driven insane by the ghost of a girl he killed, to the point that his hair turned white. He was killed in self-defense by Tracy's new partner Lizz Worthington who was also the sister of the girl who was murdered by Flattop Jr.
- Stilleta "Mrs. Flattop" Jones – The widow of Flattop Jones and the mother of Flattop Jr. and Angelica "Angeltop" Jones and a former circus performer bent on revenge for the deaths of her husband and children. She was recently killed while fighting with Sprocket Nitrate over trying to force her to be an accomplice on the planned kidnapping of Dick Tracy's grandson Dick "Trey" Tracy III, after which Sprocket killed her by throwing a 100-pound metal film can at her.
- Unnamed sister – Looks exactly like Flattop and Sharptop (possible triplet), real name was never given, but was referred to by Tracy as "Auntie Flattop". Took care of her nephew Flattop Jr. after Flattop drowned and, like her other cousin Sharptop, seemed like a law-abiding person. She genuinely cared about her nephew and was heartbroken when he turned to crime.
- Blowtop – A brother of Flattop whose distinctive feature was an explosive temper that caused him to rage at the slightest provocation, but only on trivialities; he took legitimate criticism on important matters without complaint. Blowtop was responsible for the kidnapping of Junior Tracy and the arson of Tracy's home. Like his brother Flattop, he has dealt with Vitamin Flintheart, who traded his shirt full of money for a shrunken head. He served 20 years in jail and later reformed. He rejected his niece Angeltop's plan to kill Tracy with the Brow's son and has not been seen since. He recently resurfaced by having his sister-in-law Stilleta living with him and was nearly murdered by her after an argument with her on a planned kidnapping of Dick Tracy's newborn grandson Dick "Trey" Tracy III.
- Angeltop – Angelica "Angeltop" Jones, the daughter of Flattop who has a head of equivalent dimensions, not including her fuller hair, sought to murder Dick Tracy in revenge for the death of her father and Policewoman Lizz for killing her brother. Angelica had arrived to do a television interview about her book My Life as Flattop's Daughter. Junior Tracy and Vitamin Flintheart were in the same studio, and Angelica's boyfriend, the Brow's son, shot Vitamin Flintheart. After a fire on the Santa Maria replica in the lake (the same place where her father drowned under) nearly killed her after an attempt to murder Tracy, she had plastic surgery by crooked doctor Willis Carver, whom she later killed. She was arrested later but was broken out of jail by terrorists who wished to sabotage industrialist Diet Smith's nuclear power plant. When that scheme went awry, Angeltop committed suicide with dynamite.
- Hi-Top – The son of Angeltop and an unnamed African-American jazz musician who was murdered by Angeltop after she found out that he was planning to divorce her and also planned to take sole custody of the infant Hi-Top. Hi-Top is, consequently, the grandson of Flattop. He is introduced as the leader of a black street gang, and is recruited by "Little Boy", the alleged grandson of Tracy's original arch-enemy "Big Boy" Caprice, alongside Restless Mahoney, the niece of another iconic Tracy villain; Breathless Mahoney. Together, the three form a brief triumvirate of legacies to Tracy's rogues gallery.
- Sharptop – A third Jones brother (Flattop's identical twin) who grew up right, became a college professor, and was apparently possessed by the ghost of his brother during a seance held by Gravel Gertie's vegan, female chauvinistic, New Age enthusiast niece, Crystal.
- Poptop – The beer-guzzling father of Flattop, Auntie Flattop, Blowtop, and Sharptop, the father-in-law of Stilleta, the grandfather of Flattop Jr. and Angeltop, the uncle of Frizzletop, and the great-grandfather of Hi-Top. Considered the criminal members of the family a disgrace and kept his distance from all of them.
- Croptop - Stylistically-challenged sister of Flattop and daughter of Poptop. She sports short hair on top, a buzz cut on the sides, and a mullet. She has the puckered lips and general face shape of her family. She wears a crop top showing her midriff. She was first introduced in April, 2024, freshly released from prison with a backstory not previously covered by the strip. With this introduction so long after her siblings in the timeline of the family, her brother Blowtop indicated that there were only five siblings, making her the final sibling to be introduced.

== In other media ==
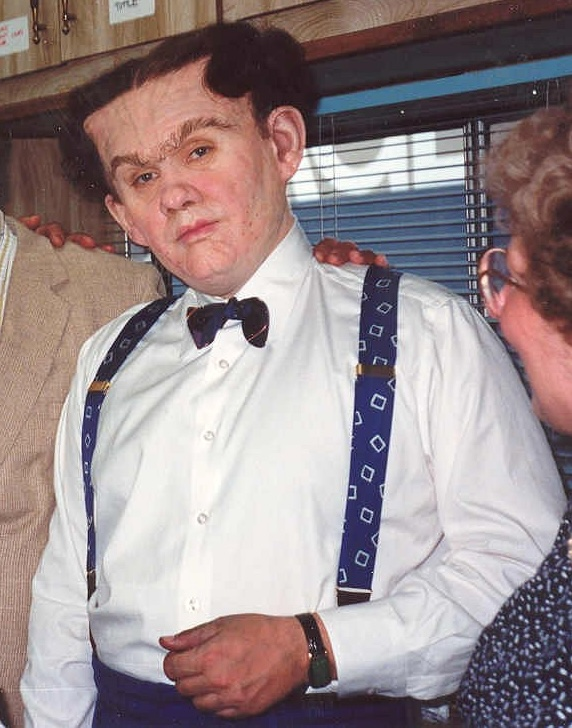
Actor William Forsythe, in costume and makeup as Flattop for Dick Tracy (1990 film)

- An episode of the Dick Tracy radio show featured Flattop. Titled "Flattop", this broadcast is now available for free from archive.org.
- In an episode of the early TV series starring Ralph Byrd, John Cliff portrayed Flattop in a half-hour episode based fairly closely on the comic strip story. Rather than giving the actor a flat head, or a haircut that made his head look flat, Cliff wore a large beret that suggested a flat top.
- In the 1990 film adaptation of the comic strip, he is played by William Forsythe. In this adaptation, he was a henchman of the main villain, Alphonse "Big Boy" Caprice (Al Pacino) and is killed during a shootout with Tracy.
- Flattop appears in the Daffy Duck short "The Great Piggy Bank Robbery", in which the animators portrayed several mini-aircraft taking off from his head, he is also seen among the dead villains falling out of the closet after Daffy shoots them.
- In The Dick Tracy Show, he was voiced by Benny Rubin and was paired up with B.B. Eyes in almost all his heists.
