= 63rd Academy Awards =

- Official poster by Saul Bass
- Date: March 25, 1991
- Site: Shrine Auditorium; Los Angeles, California, U.S.
- Hosted by: Billy Crystal
- Produced by: Gil Cates
- Directed by: Jeff Margolis

Highlights
- Best Picture: Dances With Wolves
- Most awards: Dances With Wolves (7)
- Most nominations: Dances With Wolves (12)

TV in the United States
- Network: ABC
- Duration: 3 hours, 30 minutes
- Ratings: 42.7 million 28.4% (Nielsen ratings)

The 63rd Academy Awards ceremony, organized by the Academy of Motion Picture Arts and Sciences (AMPAS), took place on March 25, 1991, at the Shrine Auditorium in Los Angeles beginning at 6:00 p.m. PST / 9:00 p.m. EST. During the ceremony, Academy Awards (commonly referred to as the Oscars) were presented in 22 categories. The ceremony, which was televised in the United States on ABC, was produced by Gil Cates and directed by Jeff Margolis. Actor Billy Crystal hosted for the second consecutive year. Three weeks earlier, in a ceremony held at The Beverly Hilton in Beverly Hills, California on March 2, the Academy Awards for Technical Achievement were presented by host Geena Davis.

Dances With Wolves won seven awards, including Best Picture. Other winners included Dick Tracy with three awards, Ghost with two awards, and American Dream, Creature Comforts, Cyrano de Bergerac, Days of Waiting, Goodfellas, The Hunt for Red October, Journey of Hope, The Lunch Date, Misery, Reversal of Fortune, and Total Recall with one. The telecast garnered nearly 43 million viewers in the United States.

== Winners and nominees ==
The nominees for the 63rd Academy Awards were announced on February 13, 1991, at 5:38 a.m. PST (13:38 UTC) at the Samuel Goldwyn Theater in Beverly Hills, California, by Karl Malden, president of the academy, and actor Denzel Washington. Dances With Wolves led the nominations with twelve total; Dick Tracy and The Godfather Part III tied for second with seven each.

The winners were announced during the awards ceremony on March 25, 1991. Kevin Costner became the fifth person to earn the Best Director Award for his directorial debut and to earn nominations for Best Actor and Best Director for the same film. Best Supporting Actress winner Whoopi Goldberg was the second African American woman to win an award. Hattie McDaniel previously won in the same category for Gone With the Wind.

=== Awards ===
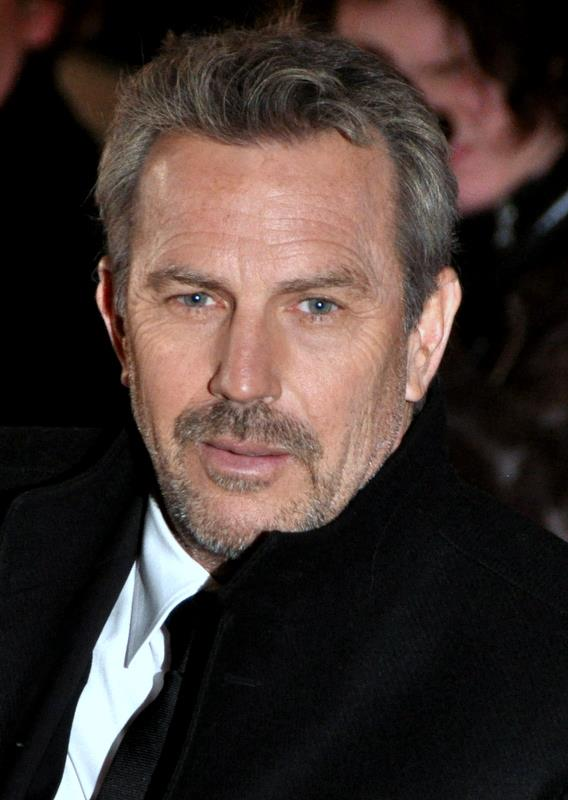
Kevin Costner, Best Director winner and Best Picture co-winner

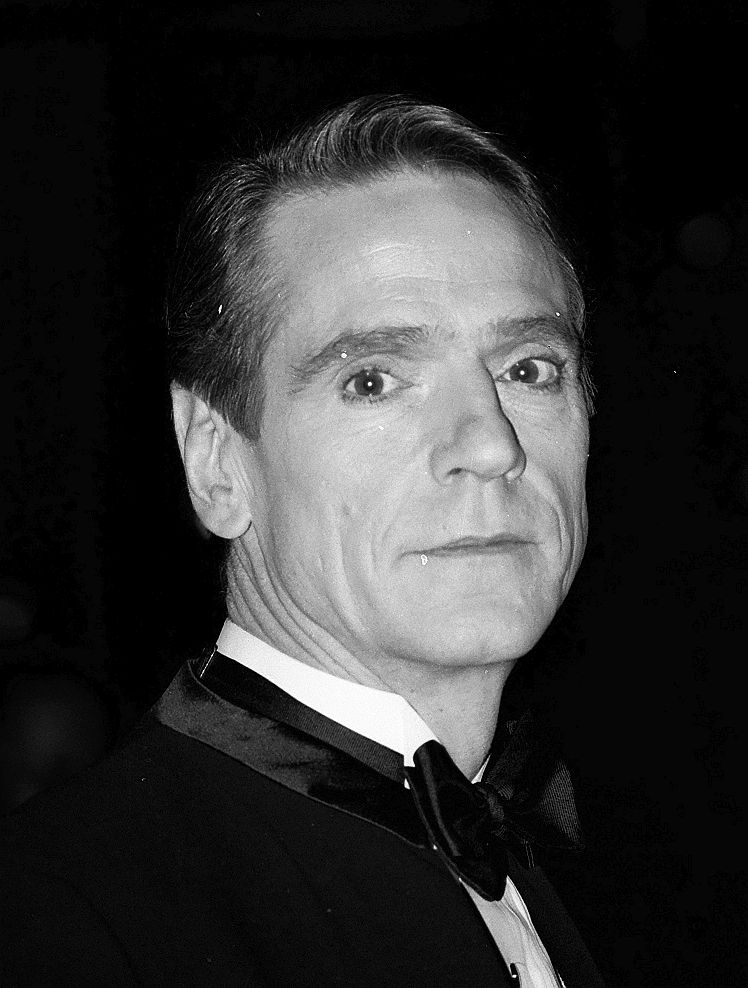
Jeremy Irons, Best Actor winner

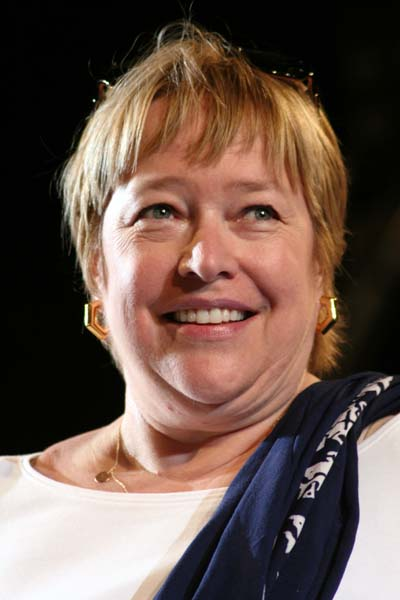
Kathy Bates, Best Actress winner

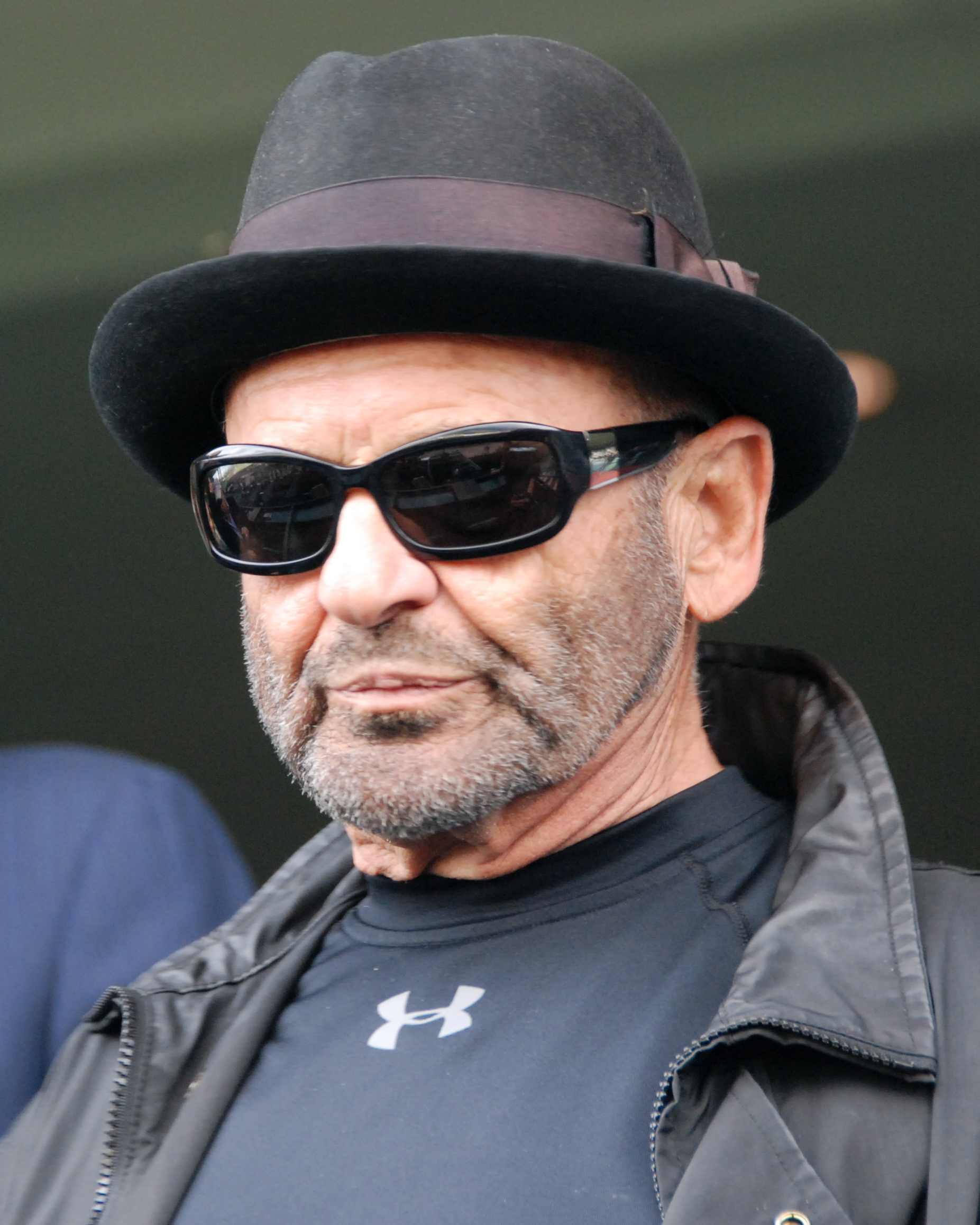
Joe Pesci, Best Supporting Actor winner

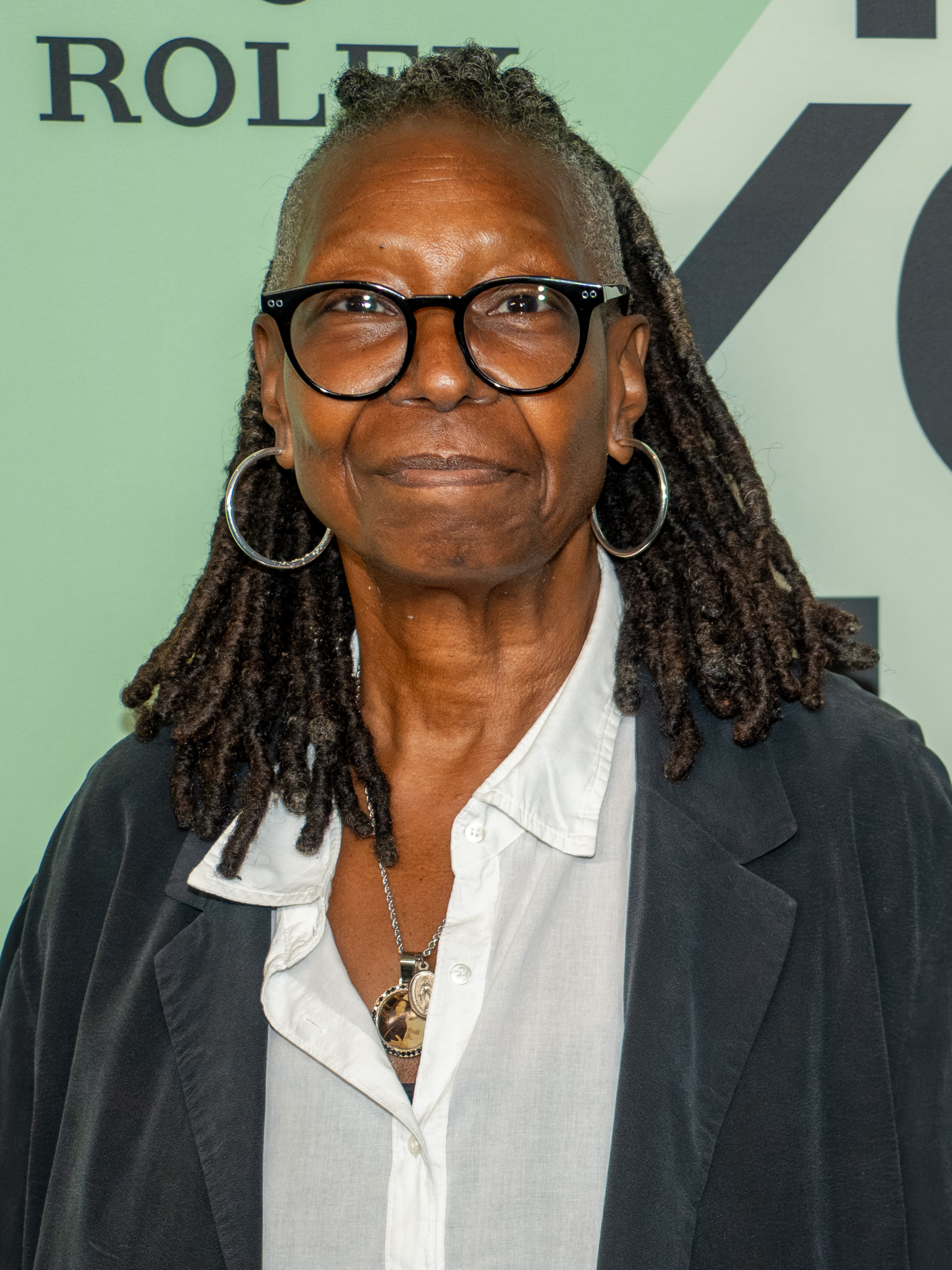
Whoopi Goldberg, Best Supporting Actress winner

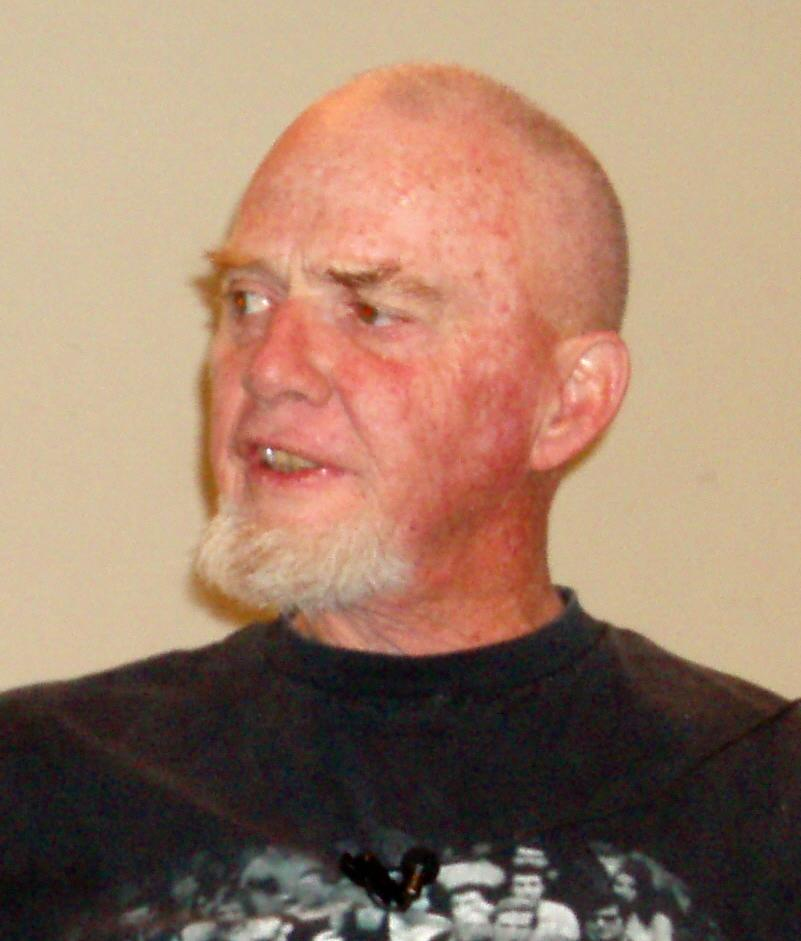
Michael Blake, Best Adapted Screenplay winner

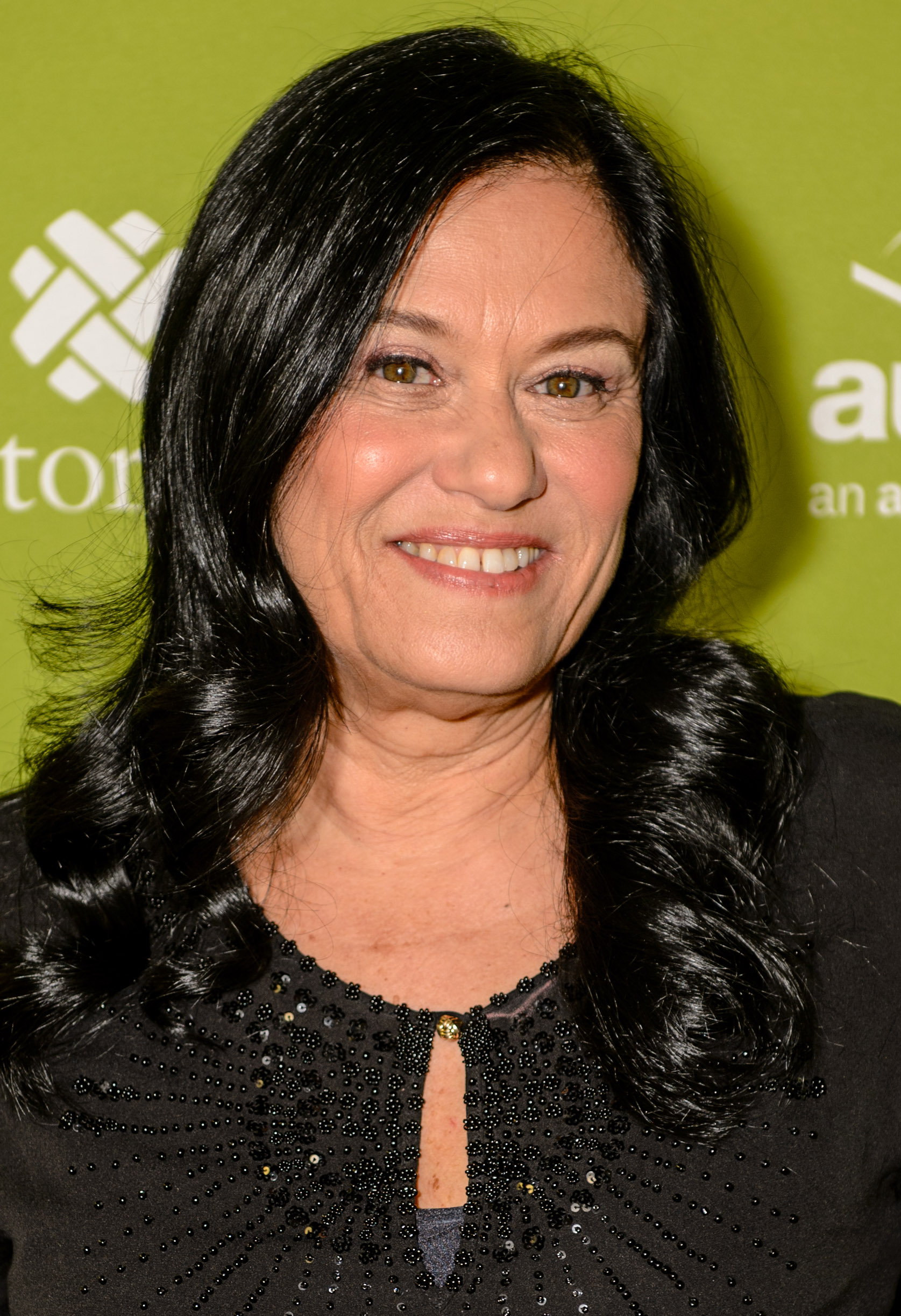
Barbara Kopple, Best Documentary Feature co-winner

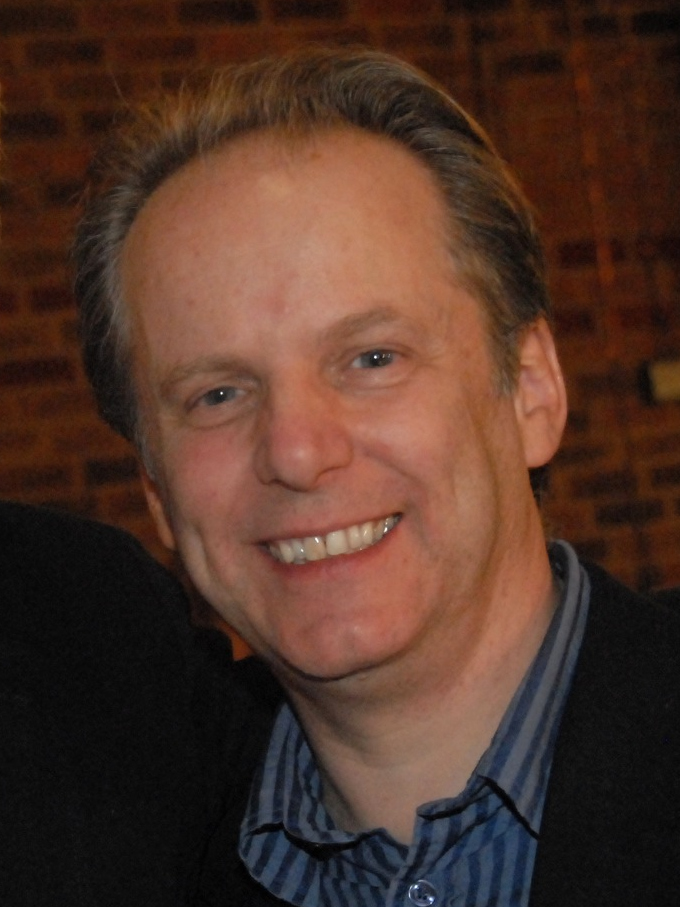
Nick Park, Best Animated Short Film winner

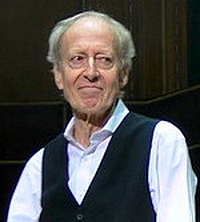
John Barry, Best Original Score winner

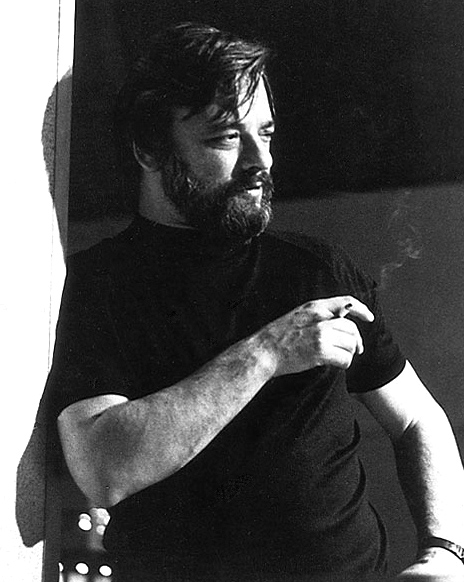
Stephen Sondheim, Best Original Song Winner

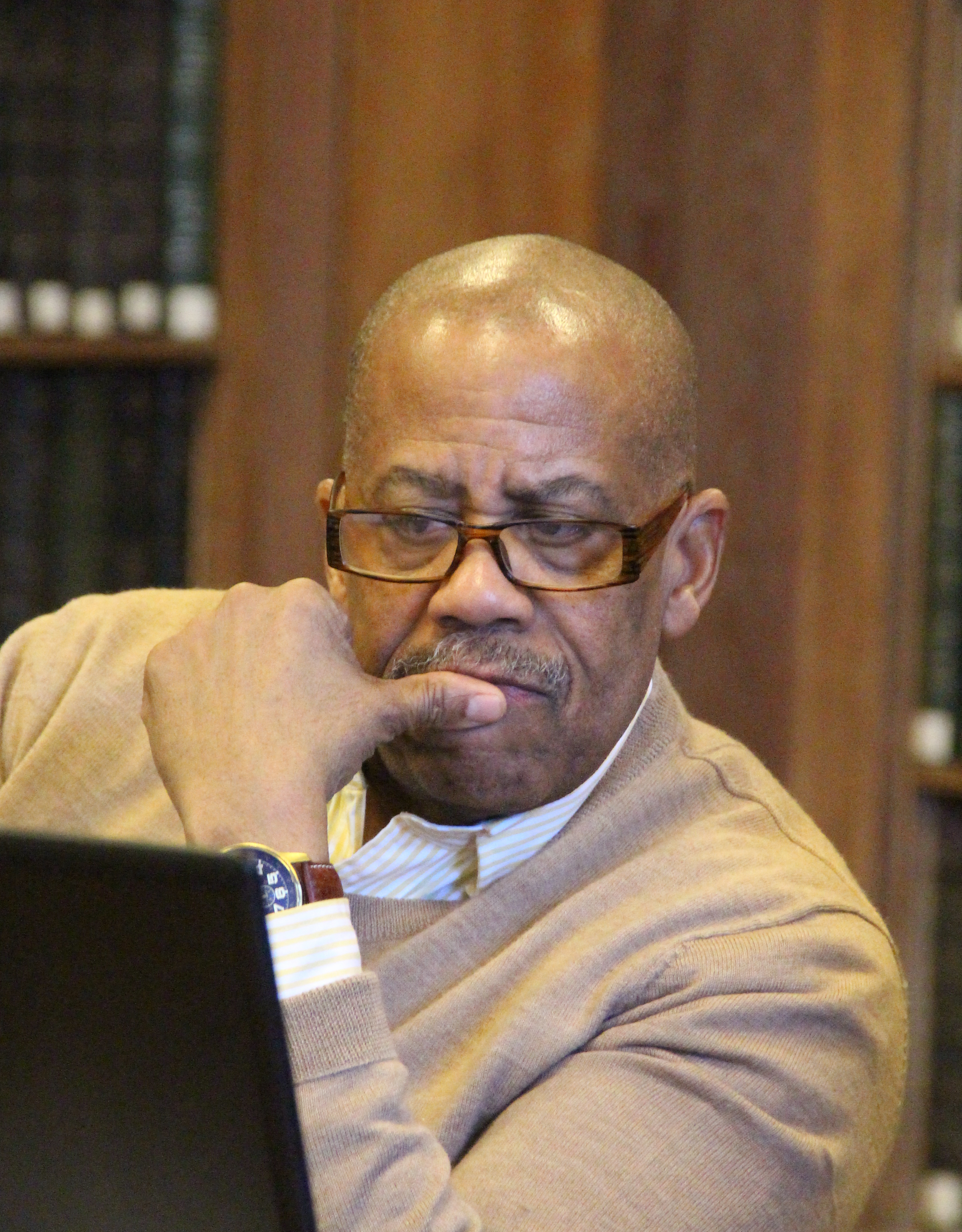
Russell Williams II, Best Sound co-winner

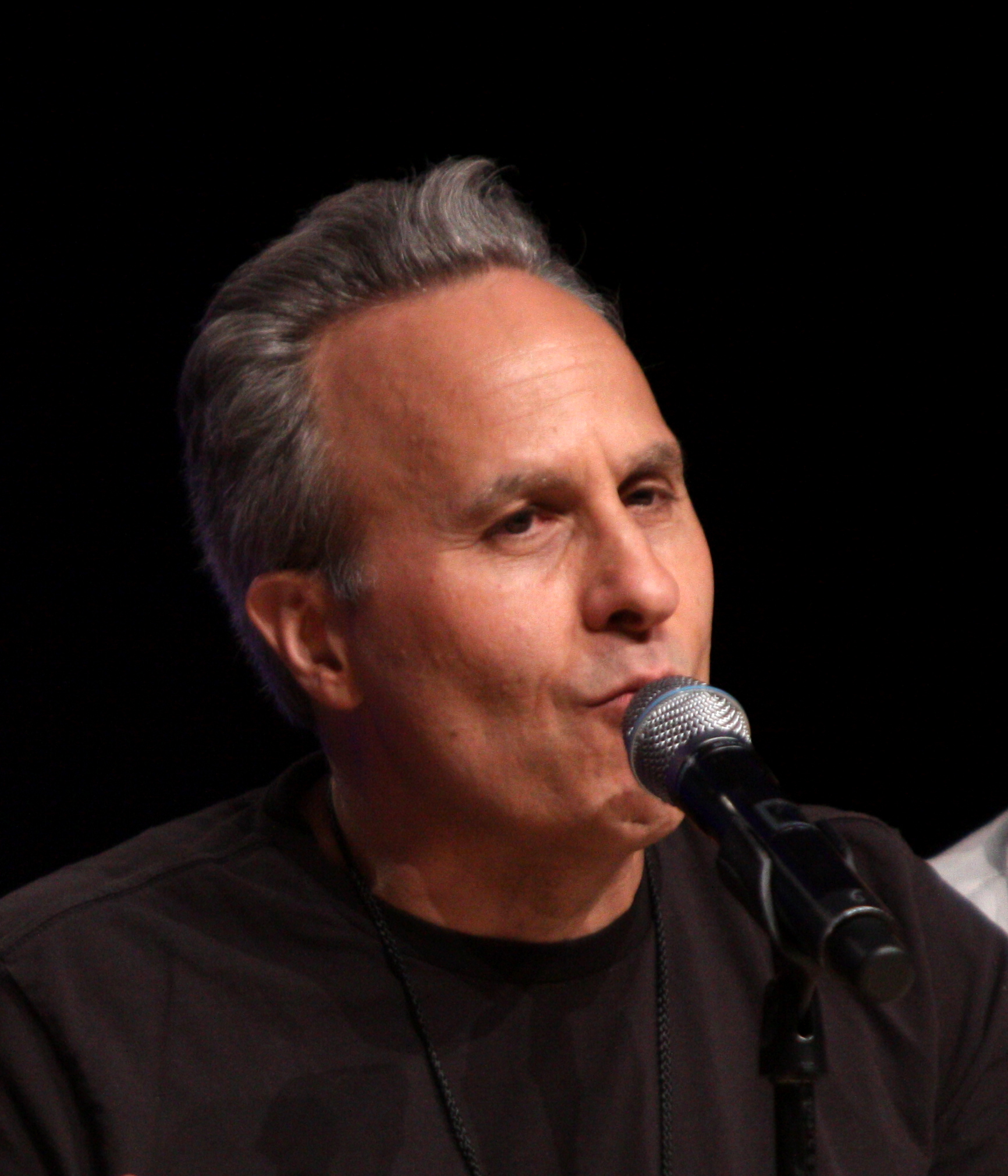
Doug Drexler, Best Makeup co-winner

Winners are listed first and highlighted in boldface.

**Best Picture**: **Dances With Wolves – Jim Wilson and Kevin Costner, producers**; Awakenings – Walter Parkes and Lawrence Lasker, producers; Ghost – Lisa Weinstein, producer; The Godfather Part III – Francis Ford Coppola, producer; Goodfellas – Irwin Winkler, producer	**Best Directing**: **Kevin Costner – Dances With Wolves**; Francis Ford Coppola – The Godfather Part III; Martin Scorsese – Goodfellas; Stephen Frears – The Grifters; Barbet Schroeder – Reversal of Fortune
**Best Actor in a Leading Role**: **Jeremy Irons – Reversal of Fortune as Claus von Bülow**; Kevin Costner – Dances With Wolves as Lieutenant John J. Dunbar/Dances With Wolves; Robert De Niro – Awakenings as Leonard Lowe; Gérard Depardieu – Cyrano de Bergerac as Cyrano de Bergerac; Richard Harris – The Field as "Bull" McCabe	**Best Actress in a Leading Role**: **Kathy Bates – Misery as Annie Wilkes**; Anjelica Huston – The Grifters as Lilly Dillon; Julia Roberts – Pretty Woman as Vivian Ward; Meryl Streep – Postcards from the Edge as Suzanne Vale; Joanne Woodward – Mr. & Mrs. Bridge as India Bridge
**Best Actor in a Supporting Role**: **Joe Pesci – Goodfellas as Tommy DeVito**; Bruce Davison – Longtime Companion as David; Andy García – The Godfather Part III as Vincent Corleone; Graham Greene – Dances With Wolves as Kicking Bird; Al Pacino – Dick Tracy as Alphonse "Big Boy" Caprice	**Best Actress in a Supporting Role**: **Whoopi Goldberg – Ghost as Oda Mae Brown**; Annette Bening – The Grifters as Myra Langtry; Lorraine Bracco – Goodfellas as Karen Friedman Hill; Diane Ladd – Wild at Heart as Marietta Fortune; Mary McDonnell – Dances With Wolves as Stands with a Fist/Christine Gunther
**Best Writing (Screenplay Written Directly for the Screen)**: **Ghost – Bruce Joel Rubin**; Alice – Woody Allen; Avalon – Barry Levinson; Green Card – Peter Weir; Metropolitan – Whit Stillman	**Best Writing (Screenplay Based on Material from Another Medium)**: **Dances With Wolves – Michael Blake based on his novel**; Awakenings – Steven Zaillian from the book by Oliver Sacks; Goodfellas – Nicholas Pileggi and Martin Scorsese from Wiseguy by Nicholas Pileggi; The Grifters – Donald E. Westlake based on the book by Jim Thompson; Reversal of Fortune – Nicholas Kazan based on the book by Alan M. Dershowitz
**Best Foreign Language Film**: **Journey of Hope (Switzerland) in German – Xavier Koller**; Cyrano de Bergerac (France) in French – Jean-Paul Rappeneau; Ju Dou (China) in Mandarin Chinese – Zhang Yimou and Yang Fengliang; The Nasty Girl (Germany) in German – Michael Verhoeven; Open Doors (Italy) in Italian – Gianni Amelio	**Best Documentary (Feature)**: **American Dream – Barbara Kopple and Arthur Cohn**; Berkeley in the Sixties – Mark Kitchell; Building Bombs – Mark Mori and Susan J. Robinson; Forever Activists: Stories from the Veterans of the Abraham Lincoln Brigade – Judith Montell; Waldo Salt: A Screenwriter's Journey – Robert Hillmann and Eugene Corr
**Best Documentary (Short Subject)**: **Days of Waiting – Steven Okazaki**; Burning Down Tomorrow – Kit Thomas; Chimps: So Like Us – Karen Goodman and Kirk Simon; Journey into Life: The World of the Unborn – Derek Bromhall; Rose Kennedy: A Life to Remember – Freida Lee Mock and Terry Sanders	**Best Short Film (Live Action)**: **The Lunch Date – Adam Davidson**; 12:01 PM – Hillary Ripps and Jonathan Heap; Bronx Cheers – Raymond De Felitta and Matthew Gross; Dear Rosie – Peter Cattaneo and Barnaby Thompson; Senzeni Na? (What Have We Done?) – Bernard Joffa and Anthony E. Nicholas
**Best Short Film (Animated)**: **Creature Comforts – Nick Park**; A Grand Day Out – Nick Park; Grasshoppers (Cavallette) – Bruno Bozzetto	**Best Music (Original Score)**: **Dances With Wolves – John Barry**; Avalon – Randy Newman; Ghost – Maurice Jarre; Havana – Dave Grusin; Home Alone – John Williams
**Best Music (Original Song)**: **"Sooner or Later (I Always Get My Man)" from Dick Tracy – Music and Lyrics by Stephen Sondheim**; "Blaze of Glory" from Young Guns II – Music and Lyrics by Jon Bon Jovi; "I'm Checkin' Out" from Postcards from the Edge – Music and Lyrics by Shel Silverstein; "Promise Me You'll Remember" from The Godfather Part III – Music by Carmine Coppola; Lyrics by John Bettis; "Somewhere in My Memory" from Home Alone – Music by John Williams; Lyrics by Leslie Bricusse	**Best Sound**: **Dances With Wolves – Jeffrey Perkins, Bill W. Benton, Gregory H. Watkins, and Russell Williams II**; Days of Thunder – Charles M. Wilborn, Donald O. Mitchell, Rick Kline, and Kevin O'Connell; Dick Tracy – Thomas Causey, Chris Jenkins, David E. Campbell, and Doug Hemphill; The Hunt for Red October – Richard Bryce Goodman, Richard Overton, Kevin F. Cleary, and Don Bassman; Total Recall – Nelson Stoll, Michael J. Kohut, Carlos Delarios, and Aaron Rochin
**Best Sound Effects Editing**: **The Hunt for Red October – Cecelia Hall and George Watters II**; Flatliners – Charles L. Campbell and Richard C. Franklin; Total Recall – Stephen Hunter Flick	**Best Art Direction**: **Dick Tracy – Art Direction: Richard Sylbert; Set Decoration: Rick Simpson**; Cyrano de Bergerac – Art Direction: Ezio Frigerio; Set Decoration: Jacques Rouxel; Dances With Wolves – Art Direction: Jeffrey Beecroft; Set Decoration: Lisa Dean; The Godfather Part III – Art Direction: Dean Tavoularis; Set Decoration: Gary Fettis; Hamlet – Art Direction: Dante Ferretti; Set Decoration: Francesca Lo Schiavo
**Best Cinematography**: **Dances With Wolves – Dean Semler**; Avalon – Allen Daviau; Dick Tracy – Vittorio Storaro; The Godfather Part III – Gordon Willis; Henry & June – Philippe Rousselot	**Best Makeup**: **Dick Tracy – John Caglione Jr. and Doug Drexler**; Cyrano de Bergerac – Michèle Burke and Jean-Pierre Eychenne; Edward Scissorhands – Ve Neill and Stan Winston
**Best Costume Design**: **Cyrano de Bergerac – Franca Squarciapino**; Avalon – Gloria Gresham; Dances With Wolves – Elsa Zamparelli; Dick Tracy – Milena Canonero; Hamlet – Maurizio Millenotti	**Best Film Editing**: **Dances With Wolves – Neil Travis**; Ghost – Walter Murch; The Godfather Part III – Barry Malkin, Lisa Fruchtman, and Walter Murch; Goodfellas – Thelma Schoonmaker; The Hunt for Red October – Dennis Virkler and John Wright

=== Special Achievement Award (Visual Effects) ===
- Total Recall – Eric Brevig, Rob Bottin, Tim McGovern and Alex Funke.

=== Honorary Awards ===
- To Sophia Loren, one of the genuine treasures of world cinema who, in a career rich with memorable performances, has added permanent luster to our art form.
- To Myrna Loy, in recognition of her extraordinary qualities both on screen and off, with appreciation for a lifetime's worth of indelible performances.

=== Irving G. Thalberg Memorial Award ===
- David Brown and Richard D. Zanuck.

=== Multiple nominations and awards ===
The following 15 films had multiple nominations:

Nominations	Film
12	Dances With Wolves
7	Dick Tracy
7	The Godfather Part III
6	Goodfellas
5	Cyrano de Bergerac
5	Ghost
4	Avalon
4	The Grifters
3	Awakenings
3	The Hunt for Red October
3	Reversal of Fortune
2	Hamlet
2	Home Alone
2	Postcards from the Edge
2	Total Recall (Note: Not counting the non-competitive Special Achievement Award for Total Recall.)

The following three films received multiple awards.

Awards	Film
7	Dances With Wolves
3	Dick Tracy
2	Ghost

== Presenters and performers ==
The following individuals, listed in order of appearance, presented awards or performed musical numbers.

=== Presenters ===
Name(s)	Role
Charlie O'Donnell	Announcer for the 63rd annual Academy Awards
Karl Malden (AMPAS President)	Gave opening remarks welcoming guests to the awards ceremony
Michael Caine	Presenter of the opening number
Denzel Washington	Presenter of the award for Best Supporting Actress
Dianne Wiest	Presenter of the award for Best Sound
Jack Lemmon	Presenter of the film Ghost on the Best Picture segment
Anne Archer	Presenter of the award for Best Makeup
Brenda Fricker	Presenter of the award for Best Supporting Actor
Chevy Chase; Martin Short	Presenters of the awards for Best Live Action Short Film
Woody Woodpecker (Dave Spafford)	Presenter of the award for Best Animated Short Film
Anjelica Huston	Presenter of the Honorary Academy Award to Myrna Loy
Joe Pesci	Introducer of the performance of Best Original Song nominee "Somewhere in My Memory"
Annette Bening	Presenter of the award for Best Costume Design
Geena Davis	Presenter of the segment of the Academy Awards for Technical Achievement and the Gordon E. Sawyer Award
Danny Aiello	Presenter of the film Goodfellas on the Best Picture segment
Jack Valenti	Presenter of the award for Best Visual Effects
Michael Douglas	Presenter of the Irving G. Thalberg Memorial Awards to David Brown and Richard D. Zanuck
Alec Baldwin; Kim Basinger	Introducers of the special dance number to the tune of the Best Original Score nominees and presenters of the award for Best Original Score
Danny Glover; Kevin Kline	Presenters of the award for Best Film Editing
Richard Gere; Susan Sarandon	Presenters of the award for Best Art Direction
Bob Hope	Presenter of the "My First Movie" montage
Phoebe Cates; Ron Silver	Presenters of the awards for Best Documentary Short Subject and Best Documentary Feature
Robert De Niro	Presenter of the film Dances With Wolves on the Best Picture segment
Andy García; Whoopi Goldberg	Presenters of the awards for Best Sound Effects Editing
Christian Slater	Introducer of the performance of Best Original Song nominee "Blaze of Glory"
Glenn Close	Presenter of the award for Best Cinematography
Dustin Hoffman	Presenter of the award for Best Foreign Language Film
Jodie Foster; Anthony Hopkins	Presenters of the awards for Best Screenplay Written Directly for the Screen and Best Screenplay Based on Material from Another Medium
Debra Winger	Presenter of the film Awakenings on the Best Picture segment
Gregory Peck	Presenter of the Honorary Academy Award to Sophia Loren
Ann-Margret; Gregory Hines	Presenters of the award for Best Original Song
Daniel Day-Lewis	Presenter of the award for Best Actress
Jessica Tandy	Presenter of the award for Best Actor
Jeff Bridges	Presenter of the film The Godfather Part III on the Best Picture segment
Tom Cruise	Presenter of the award for Best Director
Barbra Streisand	Presenter of the award for Best Picture

=== Performers ===
Name(s)	Role	Performed
Bill Conti	Musical arranger and conductor	Orchestral
Jasmine Guy; Steve LaChance	Performers	Opening number
Billy Crystal	Performer	Opening number: Goodfellas (to the tune of "Goody Goody"), Dances With Wolves (to the tune of "Dancing in the Dark" from The Band Wagon), Ghost (to the tune of "L-O-V-E"), The Godfather Part III (to the tune of "Speak Softly Love" from The Godfather) and Awakenings (to the tune of "All the Way")
Madonna	Performer	"Sooner or Later" from Dick Tracy
Children's choir	Performers	"Somewhere in My Memory" from Home Alone
Reba McEntire	Performer	"I'm Checkin' Out" from Postcards from the Edge
Bon Jovi	Performers	"Blaze of Glory" from Young Guns II
Harry Connick Jr.	Performer	"Promise Me You'll Remember (Love Theme from The Godfather Part III)" from The Godfather Part III

== Ceremony information ==
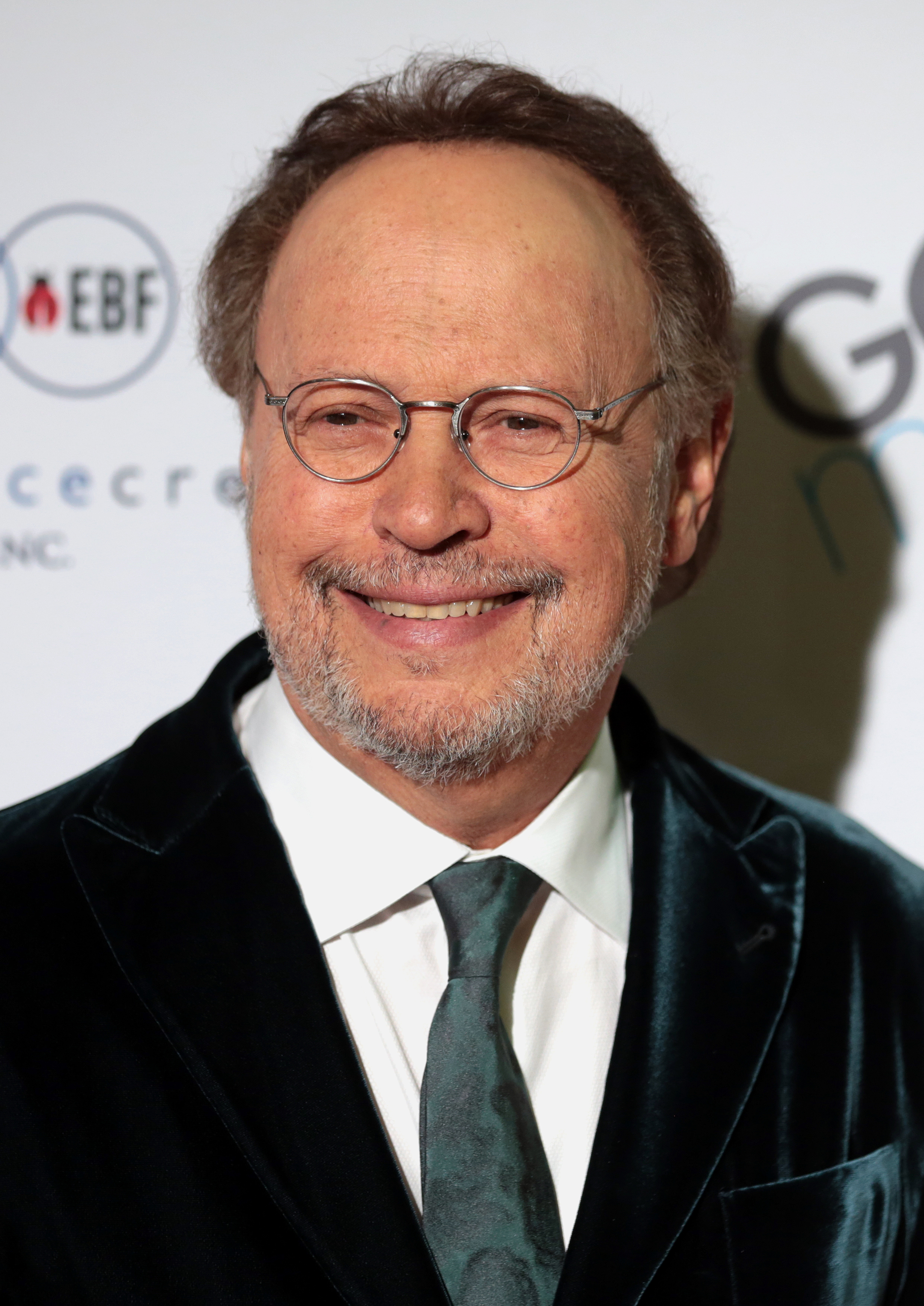
Billy Crystal hosted the ceremony.

Riding on the critical praise from last year's ceremony, the academy rehired former film producer and former Directors Guild of America president Gilbert Cates to oversee production of the Oscar ceremony for the second straight time. Two months before the awards gala, Cates selected actor and comedian Billy Crystal to host the show for the second consecutive year. Crystal made light of the honor by saying, "It's a great honor, and I hope to bring the show in under nine hours."

As with last year's theme of "Around the World in 3 1/2 Hours," Cates centered the show around a theme. He christened the ceremony with the theme "100 Years of Film" in celebration of the centennial of the development of both the kinetoscope by Thomas Edison and celluloid film by Eastman Kodak. In tandem with the theme, the show featured an ambitious opening segment. Actor Michael Caine introduced the segment live via satellite from the Salon Indien du Grand Café in Paris, where the short film L'Arrivée d'un train en gare de La Ciotat made its debut in 1895. After a brief clip of the film, the show cut back to the Shrine Auditorium stage, where actress Jasmine Guy and other dancers performed while a montage of film clips was projected in the background. Filmmaker Chuck Workman filmed a vignette featuring actors such as Sally Field, Andy García, and Anjelica Huston discussing the first movie the actors watched.

Several other people participated in the production of the ceremony. Film composer and musician Bill Conti served as musical director for the ceremony. Dancer Debbie Allen choreographed a dance number showcasing the Best Original Score nominees. Despite losing eight members of her band in a plane crash, a visibly emotional Reba McEntire performed the Best Original Song nominee "I'm Checkin' Out" from the film Postcards from the Edge. At the beginning of the ceremony, wrangler Lisa Brown escorted host Crystal, and Beechnut, a horse that was prominently featured in the upcoming film City Slickers.

=== Box office performance of nominees ===
At the time of the nominations announcement on February 12, the combined gross of the five Best Picture nominees at the US box office was $458.2 million with an average of $41 million per film. Ghost was the highest earner among the Best Picture nominees, with $213.5 million in domestic box office receipts. The film was followed by Dances With Wolves ($104.3 million), The Godfather Part III ($62.5 million), Goodfellas ($41 million), and finally Awakenings ($36.7 million).

Of the top 50 highest-grossing films released in 1990, 51 nominations went to 12 films on the list. Only Ghost (2nd), Pretty Woman (3rd), Dances With Wolves (8th), Dick Tracy (9th), The Godfather Part III (17th), Goodfellas (30th), and Awakenings (34th) were nominated for Best Picture, directing, acting, or screenwriting. The other top 50 box office hits that earned nominations were Home Alone (1st), The Hunt for Red October (5th), Total Recall (6th), Days of Thunder (12th), and Edward Scissorhands (22nd).

=== Critical reviews ===
The show received a mixed reception from media publications. Some media outlets were more critical of the show. Rick DuBrow of the Los Angeles Times wrote, "It was a long day's journey into night for Oscar, one of the most effective sleeping pills of the year." He also added that while host Crystal started out strong, his jokes fell flat as the night progressed. The Washington Post television critic Tom Shales noted that Crystal, "followed many gags by instantly rating the reaction of the audience, as if it were up to them to please him instead of the other way around." In addition, he commented, "The Oscars seemed more of a fizzle than usual this year." Columnist Dan Craft of The Pantagraph remarked, "The Oscar show has become innocuously hip and yuppified. Kitsch and nostalgia have given way to efficiency and upward mobility. Everyone is tiresomely well-behaved and, worse, well-dressed." He also commented that host Crystal's insider showbiz jokes fell flat and were confusing to television audiences.

Other media outlets received the broadcast more positively. Columnist Harold Schindler of The Salt Lake Tribune wrote, "Billy Crystal kept things moving Monday night in such a manner that the extra quarter-hour was scarcely noticeable." He also said of the telecast's theme of film history, "The Academy used its film library to excellent advantage." Film critic Leonard Maltin remarked, "Emotions ran high and they gave us all a chance to feel vicariously what it might be like to win this kind of award...good guys finishing first and the part of Hollywood we like best, a happy ending." Orlando Sentinel film critic Jay Boyar complimented Crystal for invigorating the gala, noting that his "clever remarks at the academy's 63rd annual awards presentation struck an entertaining balance between inside-Hollywood quips and general-audience jests."

=== Ratings and reception ===
The American telecast on ABC drew in an average of 42.7 million people over its length, which was a 6% increase from the previous year's ceremony. An estimated 76 million total viewers watched all or part of the awards. The show also drew higher Nielsen ratings compared to the previous ceremony, with 28.4% of households watching over a 48 share. It was the most watched Oscars telecast since the 56th ceremony held in 1984.

In July 1991, the ceremony presentation received nine nominations at the 43rd Primetime Emmys. The following month, the ceremony won three of those nominations for Outstanding Variety, Music, or Comedy Program (Gil Cates), Outstanding Individual Performance in a Variety or Music Program (Billy Crystal), and Outstanding Writing for a Variety or Music Program (Hal Kanter, Buz Kohan, Billy Crystal, David Steinberg, Bruce Vilanch, and Robert Wuhl).

== See also ==
- 11th Golden Raspberry Awards
- 33rd Grammy Awards
- 43rd Primetime Emmy Awards
- 44th British Academy Film Awards
- 45th Tony Awards
- 48th Golden Globe Awards
- List of submissions to the 63rd Academy Awards for Best Foreign Language Film

== Bibliography ==
- Kinn, Gail; Piazza, Jim (2002), The Academy Awards: The Complete Unofficial History, New York, United States: Workman Publishing Company, ISBN 978-1579123963
- Wiley, Mason; Bona, Damien (1996), Inside Oscar: The Unofficial History of the Academy Awards (5 ed.), New York, United States: Ballantine Books, ISBN 0-345-40053-4, OCLC 779680732
- Wilson, Staci Lynne (2007), Animal Movies Guide, Running Free Press, ISBN 978-0-967518-534, OCLC 779680732
