= 44th British Academy Film Awards =

1991 film awards ceremony

- Date: 17 March 1991
- Site: Grosvenor House Hotel
- Hosted by: Noel Edmonds

Highlights
- Best Film: Goodfellas
- Best Actor: Philippe Noiret; Cinema Paradiso
- Best Actress: Jessica Tandy; Driving Miss Daisy
- Most awards: Cinema Paradiso and Goodfellas (5)
- Most nominations: Cinema Paradiso (11)

The 44th British Academy Film Awards, more commonly known as the BAFTAs, took place on 17 March 1991 at the Grosvenor House Hotel in London, honouring the best national and foreign films of 1990. Presented by the British Academy of Film and Television Arts, accolades were handed out for the best feature-length film and documentaries of any nationality that were screened at British cinemas in 1990.

Martin Scorsese's Goodfellas won five awards: Best Film, Director, Adapted Screenplay, Costume Design, and Editing. Cinema Paradiso, directed by Giuseppe Tornatore, also won five awards, including Best Actor (Philippe Noiret), Supporting Actor (Salvatore Cascio) and Film Not in the English Language.

With its five wins, Cinema Paradiso achieved a new record for the most BAFTAs for a film not in the English language; this record was surpassed by the German language anti-war epic All Quiet on the Western Front (2022), which won seven BAFTAs in 2023.

== Winners and nominees ==
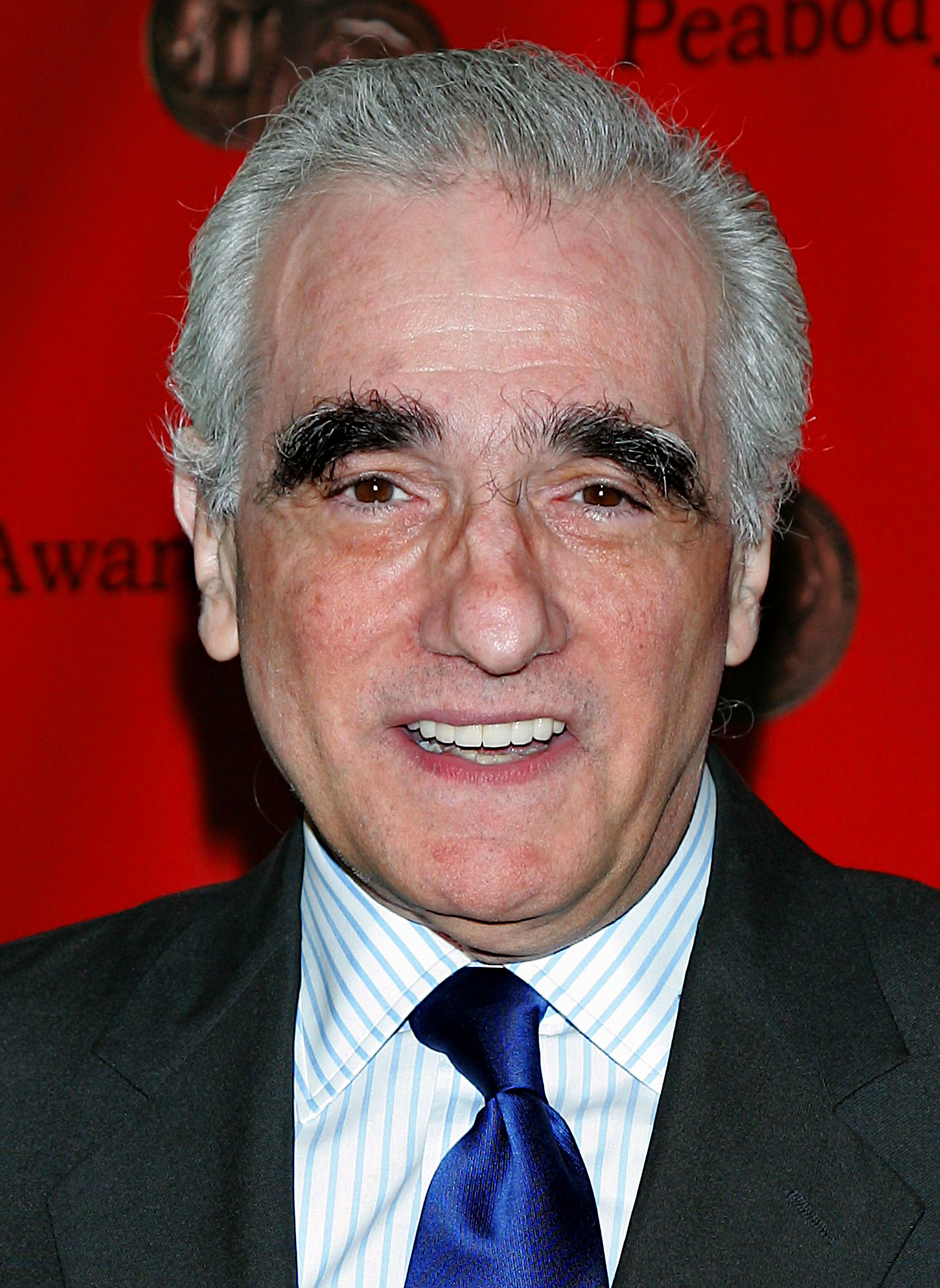
Martin Scorsese, Best Film co-winner, Best Director winner and Best Adapted Screenplay co-winner

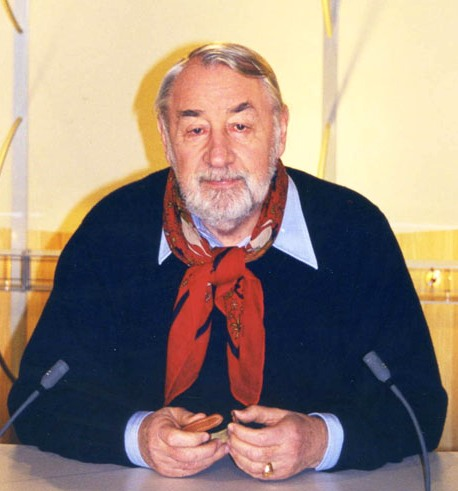
Philippe Noiret, Best Actor winner

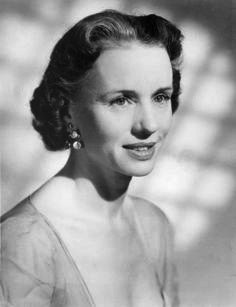
Jessica Tandy, Best Actress winner

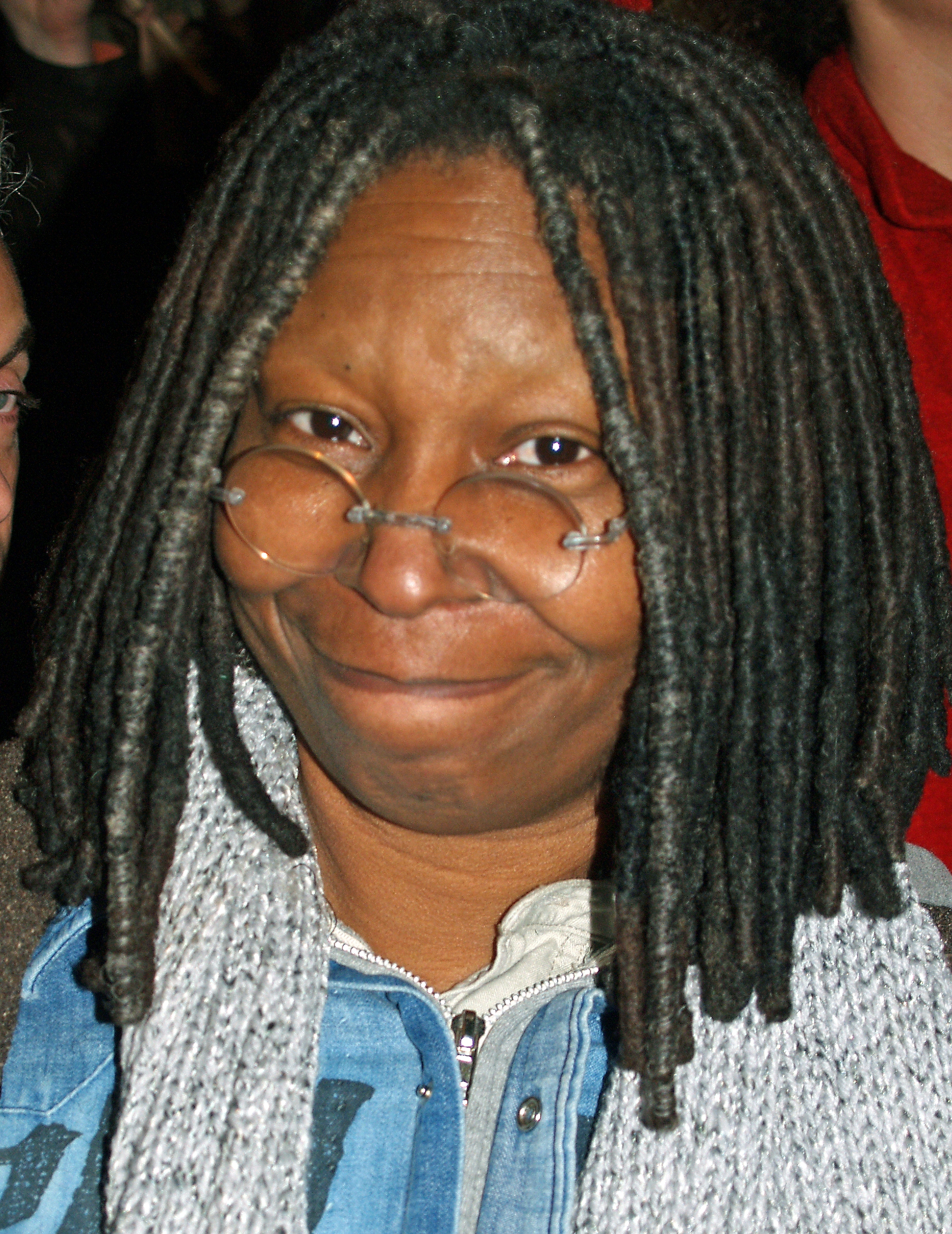
Whoopi Goldberg, Best Supporting Actress winner

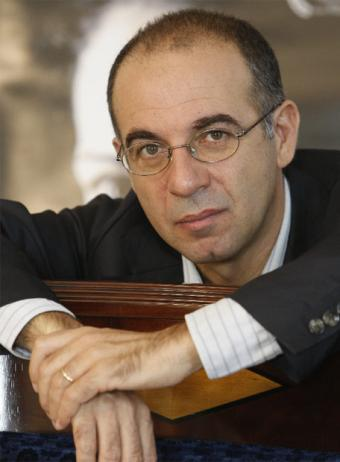
Giuseppe Tornatore, Best Original Screenplay winner and Best Film Not in the English Language co-winner

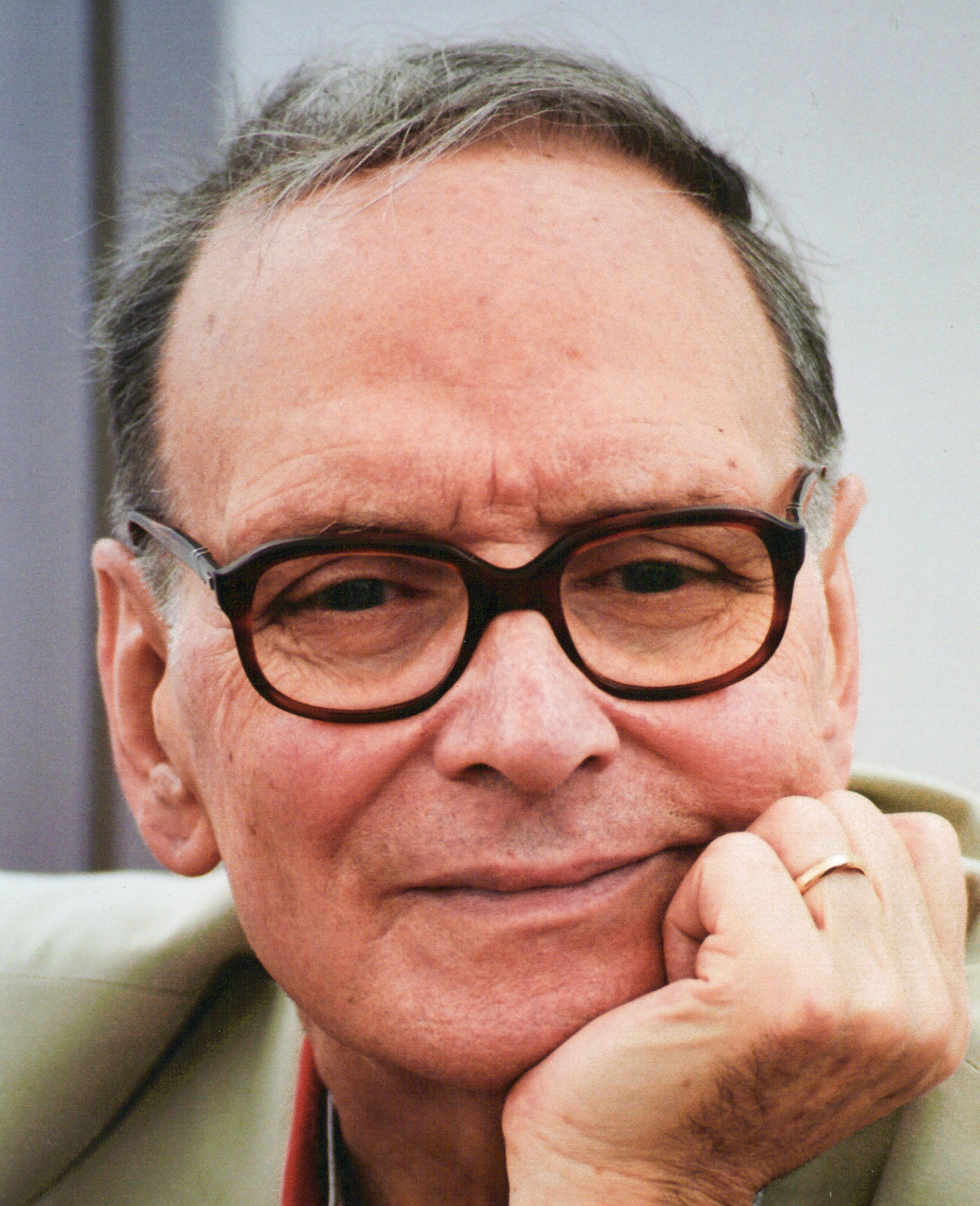
Ennio Morricone, Best Original Music co-winner

=== BAFTA Fellowship ===
- **Louis Malle**

=== Outstanding British Contribution to Cinema ===
- **Jeremy Thomas**

=== BAFTA Special Award ===
- **Alistair Cooke**, **Deborah Kerr** and **Angela Lansbury**

=== BAFTA Special Award for Craft ===
- **John Box**

=== Awards ===
Winners are listed first and highlighted in boldface.

**Best Film**: **Goodfellas – Irwin Winkler and Martin Scorsese**; Crimes and Misdemeanors – Robert Greenhut and Woody Allen; Driving Miss Daisy – Richard D. Zanuck, Lili Fini Zanuck and Bruce Beresford; Pretty Woman – Arnon Milchan, Steven Reuther and Garry Marshall	**Best Direction**: **Martin Scorsese – Goodfellas**; Woody Allen – Crimes and Misdemeanors; Bruce Beresford – Driving Miss Daisy; Giuseppe Tornatore – Cinema Paradiso
**Best Actor in a Leading Role**: **Philippe Noiret – Cinema Paradiso as Alfredo**; Sean Connery – The Hunt for Red October as Captain First Rank Marko Ramius; Tom Cruise – Born on the Fourth of July as Ron Kovic; Robert De Niro – Goodfellas as James Conway	**Best Actress in a Leading Role**: **Jessica Tandy – Driving Miss Daisy as Daisy Werthan**; Shirley MacLaine – Postcards from the Edge as Doris Mann; Michelle Pfeiffer – The Fabulous Baker Boys as Susie Diamond; Julia Roberts – Pretty Woman as Vivian Ward
**Best Actor in a Supporting Role**: **Salvatore Cascio – Cinema Paradiso as Salvatore "Totò" Di Vita (Child)**; Alan Alda – Crimes and Misdemeanors as Lester; John Hurt – The Field as Bird O'Donnell; Al Pacino – Dick Tracy as Alphonse "Big Boy" Caprice	**Best Actress in a Supporting Role**: **Whoopi Goldberg – Ghost as Oda Mae Brown**; Anjelica Huston – Crimes and Misdemeanors as Dolores Paley; Shirley MacLaine – Steel Magnolias as Louisa Boudreaux; Billie Whitelaw – The Krays as Violet Kray
**Best Original Screenplay**: **Cinema Paradiso – Giuseppe Tornatore**; Crimes and Misdemeanors – Woody Allen; Ghost – Bruce Joel Rubin; Pretty Woman – J. F. Lawton	**Best Adapted Screenplay**: **Goodfellas – Nicholas Pileggi and Martin Scorsese**; Born on the Fourth of July – Oliver Stone and Ron Kovic; Driving Miss Daisy – Alfred Uhry; Postcards from the Edge – Carrie Fisher; The War of the Roses – Michael J. Leeson
**Best Cinematography**: **The Sheltering Sky – Vittorio Storaro**; Cinema Paradiso – Blasco Giurato; Glory – Freddie Francis; Goodfellas – Michael Ballhaus	**Best Costume Design**: **Goodfellas – Richard Bruno**; Cinema Paradiso – Beatrice Bulgari; Dick Tracy – Milena Canonero; Pretty Woman – Marilyn Vance
**Best Editing**: **Goodfellas – Thelma Schoonmaker**; Cinema Paradiso – Mario Morra; Crimes and Misdemeanors – Susan E. Morse; Dick Tracy – Richard Marks	**Best Makeup and Hair**: **Dick Tracy – John Caglione Jr. and Doug Drexler**; Cinema Paradiso – Maurizio Trani; Ghost – Ben Nye Jr.; The Witches – Christine Beveridge and Jim Henson's Creature Shop
**Best Original Music**: **Cinema Paradiso – Ennio Morricone and Andrea Morricone**; The Fabulous Baker Boys – Dave Grusin; Memphis Belle – George Fenton; Postcards from the Edge – Carly Simon	**Best Production Design**: **Dick Tracy – Richard Sylbert**; Cinema Paradiso – Andrea Crisanti; The Hunt for Red October – Terence Marsh; The Sheltering Sky – Gianni Silvestri
**Best Sound**: **The Fabulous Baker Boys – J. Paul Huntsman, Stephan Von Hase, Chris Jenkins, Gary Alexander and Doug Hemphill**; Dick Tracy – Dennis Drummond, Thomas Causey, Chris Jenkins, David E. Campbell and Doug Hemphill; The Hunt for Red October – Cecelia Hall, George Watters II, Richard Bryce Goodman and Don Bassman; Wild at Heart – Randy Thom, Richard Hymns, Jon Huck and David Parker	**Best Special Visual Effects**: **Honey, I Shrunk the Kids – Production Team**; Dick Tracy – Production Team; Ghost – Production Team; Total Recall – Production Team
**Best Documentary**: Harold Lloyd: The Third Genius – Kevin Brownlow and David Gill; The Last African Flying Boat – David Wallace; Viewpoint: Cambodia, The Betrayal – A Special Report by John Pilger – David Munro; Viewpoint: Ceausescu's Children – Patricia Ingram	**Best Film Not in the English Language**: **Cinema Paradiso – Franco Cristaldi and Giuseppe Tornatore**; Jesus of Montreal – Roger Frappier, Pierre Gendron and Denys Arcand; Mama, There's a Man in Your Bed – Jean-Louis Piel, Philippe Carcassonne and Coline Serreau; May Fools – Louis Malle
**Best Short Animation**: **Toxic – Andrew McEwan**; Deadsy – David Anderson; The Death of Stalinism in Bohemia – Jan Švankmajer	**Best Short Film**: **Say Goodbye – Michele Camarda and John Roberts**; At the Border – Michael Drexler and Max Linder; Chicken – Julian Nott and Jo Shoop; Dear Rosie – Barnaby Thompson and Peter Cattaneo

== Statistics ==
Films that received multiple nominations
Nominations	Film
11	Cinema Paradiso
7	Dick Tracy
7	Goodfellas
6	Crimes and Misdemeanors
4	Driving Miss Daisy
4	Ghost
4	Pretty Woman
3	The Fabulous Baker Boys
3	The Hunt for Red October
3	Postcards from the Edge
2	Born on the Fourth of July
2	The Sheltering Sky

Films that received multiple awards
Awards	Film
5	Cinema Paradiso
5	Goodfellas
2	Dick Tracy

== See also ==
- 63rd Academy Awards
- 16th César Awards
- 43rd Directors Guild of America Awards
- 4th European Film Awards
- 48th Golden Globe Awards
- 2nd Golden Laurel Awards
- 11th Golden Raspberry Awards
- 5th Goya Awards
- 6th Independent Spirit Awards
- 17th Saturn Awards
- 43rd Writers Guild of America Awards
