= Breathless Mahoney =

Femme fatale character in the American comic strip Dick Tracy

Publication information
- Publisher: Tribune Media Services
- First appearance: May 11, 1945
- Created by: Chester Gould

Breathless Mahoney is a fictional character in the American comic strip Dick Tracy, created by Chester Gould. She first appeared in the strip on May 11, 1945, and was apparently killed on August 26, 1946.

The character found worldwide fame in 1990 in the film Dick Tracy, as a villainous nightclub singer played by singer/actress Madonna. The character's glamorous outfits, described extensively in the press, sparked a brief fad for 1940s fashion.

== Comic strip character ==
Breathless Mahoney was created by Chester Gould and introduced to the Dick Tracy comic strip on May 10, 1945. Garyn G. Roberts, author of Dick Tracy and American Culture: Morality and Mythology, Text and Context, noted that the introduction of Breathless coincided with Gould's efforts to "integrate characters and episodes with a sophistication that would mark the 1950s Tracy continuities". The character was illustrated as an attractive young blonde intended to resemble actress Veronica Lake. Breathless is portrayed as greedy and obsessed with money, willing to murder to obtain it. She is the stepdaughter of Shaky, a Dick Tracy antagonist who had recently been killed in the storyline; she discovers his skeletal remains near the waterfront in one of the strips. Writer Meredith M. Malburne-Wade said the character is named "Breathless" because "she both speaks in a breathy voice meant to pull others closer to her and strives to leave the men around her breathless in her wake".

The original comic strip version of Breathless Mahoney is depicted as a ruthless killer, in contrast to the character's more sympathetic later version in the 1990 film adaptation of Dick Tracy. At one point, she stabs a man in the back with a pair of pruning shears. During one of her storylines, Breathless encounters B.O. Plenty, an unkempt hillbilly-like character who schemes to steal her money. Roberts said of this storyline: "The conflict between the physically beautiful villainess and the unwashed country bumpkin makes for entertaining reading." Breathless made her final appearance in a Dick Tracy comic strip on August 25, 1946, in which the character dies. Just before her death, while lying in a hospital bed, she writes a final letter forgiving B.O. Plenty for past issues she had with him.

== 1990 movie ==
Breathless Mahoney appears in the film adaptation Dick Tracy (1990), in which she is portrayed by actress and singer Madonna. The film character differs from the original comic strip counterpart, most notably in her profession as a nightclub singer. She is also less violent than the comic strip version of the character, more calculating in her actions, and is revealed to be as intelligent as Dick Tracy himself. Writers Christopher L. Lukinbeal and Cristina B. Kennedy wrote of the character: "Breathless, in the film, provides a complex, more 1980s, opposition of good and evil, moral and amoral." In another difference from the source material, Breathless was not introduced in the comic strip until 1945, but the film is set in the 1930s. She is one of several characters in the film who was introduced in the 1940s in the comic, along with 88 Keyes and Sam Catchem. Breathless Mahoney also disguises herself in the film as the vigilante "The Blank", wearing a mask that makes her appear to have no face. Madonna, who was dating Dick Tracy star and director Warren Beatty at the time, sought the role of Breathless, but offered to work for scale to avoid the perception of nepotism, earning just $35,000 for the film.

In the film, she is introduced as a nightclub singer and the moll of gangster Lips Manlis (Paul Sorvino). When Manlis is murdered by his rival and former right-hand man Big Boy Caprice (Al Pacino), she switches her allegiance to Caprice and starts singing in his club, even though she is personally repulsed by him. She is immediately attracted to Caprice's nemesis, Detective Dick Tracy (Beatty), and tries to seduce him, but he remains faithful to his girlfriend, Tess Trueheart (Glenne Headly). She disguises herself as "The Blank", a vigilante criminal wearing a faceless mask, and robs several of Caprice's front businesses, making enemies of both Caprice and Tracy. In the film's climax, Breathless, as the Blank, rescues Tracy and Tess from Caprice, who shoots and mortally wounds her. After Tracy kills Caprice, he removes Breathless' Blank mask, and she dies in his arms.

In the film, Breathless is portrayed as a femme fatale, and as Lukinbeal and Kennedy note: "Where Tracy represents day, she represents night. While Tracy fights to protect the city from evil, Breathless is only concerned with her own future and, like Big Boy Caprice, with her desire to "own" the city." The song "More", which Breathless sings at a nightclub, is symbolic of her plans to own the city, according to writer Steve Swayne. On the surface, it sounds like a song about a flirtatious woman who can never get enough, but Swayne said it in fact symbolizes her secret plan to trap Caprice and take over his criminal empire. The fact that Breathless continues to sing the song unabated in the nightclub while Caprice's men engage in a shootout with the police, due to events Breathless herself put into motion, only further underscores this. Breathless is portrayed as a temptress in the film, providing as a stark contrast against Tess, who represents the more pure and clean-cut choice.

In the book The Encyclopedia of Sexism in American Films, Meredith M. Malburne-Wade writes that Breathless and Tess "occupy predominantly standard (and stereotypical) roles for women". She also wrote: "The two women seem, on the surface, to clearly occupy opposite sides of the angel/whore or angel/monster dichotomy set out by many feminist and literary critics. ...Mahoney is the monster/whore, posing as a man, flaunting her body and sexuality, and ultimately challenging men who try to control her." She says Breathless' advances on Dick Tracy and others in the film stereotypically suggest men are simply victims of sexually available women. However, Malburne-Wade also notes that both Breathless and Tess are "largely constrained by masculinity and by love" in the film, and that Breathless has little control herself over the direction of her own life, which is instead dictated by the actions of gangsters like Lips Manlis and Big Boy Caprice, the latter of whom is physically abusive toward her. She writes: "The fact that her sexuality is her only bargaining chip – and one that is as likely to get her beaten as it is to get her kissed – suggests a brutally patriarchal world." The only time she holds power over her own destiny is when she disguises herself as a man: the Blank. In the book Madonna as Postmodern Myth, Georges-Claude Guilbert writes that in Dick Tracy, Madonna's Breathless Mahoney "is a bad girl because in a macho world, women in power are disturbing".

Garyn G. Roberts wrote that Madonna's established image as a singer and celebrity "played well into the character of Breathless Mahoney; her singing was one of several highlights of the motion picture production". Madonna, in character as Breathless Mahoney, sings several songs in the Dick Tracy film. Many of these songs were included in the soundtrack album Madonna released called I'm Breathless (1990), which was also named after the character. Among the songs is a duet of Stephen Sondheim's "What Can You Lose" between Breathless and 88 Keys (Mandy Patinkin). Others include the song "More", and "Sooner or Later", both of which Madonna sings in character as Breathless, and the latter of which went on to win the Academy Award for Best Original Song. In a review of I'm Breathless for Entertainment Weekly, Greg Sandow noted that Breathless' role as a temptress in the film resulted in Madonna "pushing sexual barriers farther than ever in I'm Breathless".

Following the release of the film, several companies began developing garments inspired by Breathless' character. For example, the Los Angeles company L.A. Glo created a dress collection inspired by Breathless, with dress costs ranging from $70 to $180.
