= Sooner or Later (Madonna song) =

Song by Madonna

from the album I'm Breathless: Music from and Inspired by the Film Dick Tracy
- Released: May 21, 1990
- Recorded: 1990
- Genre: Jazz
- Length: 3:20
- Label: Sire; Warner Bros.
- Songwriter: Stephen Sondheim
- Producers: Madonna; Bill Bottrell

"Sooner or Later" is a song recorded by the American singer Madonna from her soundtrack album I'm Breathless: Music from and Inspired by the Film Dick Tracy (1990). Written by American composer Stephen Sondheim and produced by Madonna and Bill Bottrell, the song was used in the parent film, Dick Tracy. "Sooner or Later" was composed to evoke the theatrical nature and style of the film. A 1930s-style jazz ballad with piano, drum, double bass, and horns, the track conjures up the atmosphere of a smoky nightclub. Madonna sings in her lowest register accompanied by a variable pitch.

Critical response to the track was positive, with reviewers deeming it as an important addition to Madonna's music catalog. At the 63rd Academy Awards held on March 25, 1991, the song won an Oscar for Best Original Song, awarded to Sondheim. Madonna attended the ceremony along with singer Michael Jackson as her date, and performed "Sooner or Later" onstage, being inspired by the look of actress Marilyn Monroe. Madonna also performed the song at her 1990 Blond Ambition World Tour.

== Background ==
In 1990, Madonna was part of the film Dick Tracy starring as Breathless Mahoney with Warren Beatty playing the title character. Madonna told Premiere magazine that initially she had waited for Beatty to call her for the film. When Beatty did not reciprocate, the singer decided to involve herself voluntarily. She pursued the part of Mahoney, but offered to work for minimum wages to avoid favoritism. Dick Tracy was the ninth-highest-grossing film in the US in 1990, and number twelve globally. The film also received positive reviews from critics. Roger Ebert from the Chicago Sun-Times praised the matte paintings, art direction and prosthetic makeup design, stating: "Dick Tracy is one of the most original and visionary fantasies I've seen on a screen".

By the 1980s, record labels started to release albums that were closely associated with a film, thereby gaining double promotion. These were mostly termed as soundtracks although many of them were not related to the film. After the filming for Dick Tracy was over by May 1989, Madonna started working on the soundtrack. She had begun recording three songs by Stephen Sondheim for the film—"Sooner or Later", "More" and "What Can You Lose"—which would be part of the album, but also had to write and develop new songs comparable in style to the previous. She produced the entire album, including the Sondheim songs. "I want people to think of me as a musical comedy actress. That's what this album is about for me. It's a stretch. Not just pop music, but songs that have a different feel to them, a theatrical feel", she said at the time.

== Composition ==
"Sooner or Later"
A sample from "Sooner or Later" displaying the piano and the brushed drum sounds as well as the horns. It is accompanied by Madonna's singing in her lowest range. The sample also displays the characteristic nightclub like atmosphere in the song.

According to Rikky Rooksby, author of The Complete Guide to the Music of Madonna, the harmonic and melodic styles of the songs she developed with Sondheim were more "complex" than her usual recordings, hence Madonna found it difficult and demanding. She spoke about the "wilderness" of the tunes, saying that she was not confident of doing justice to the songs, and neither was Sondheim. But he kept on encouraging the singer so that the recording sessions would not be affected. Madonna also recruited producer Patrick Leonard and engineer Bill Bottrell to help her with the project. She and Leonard toiled to create music that would fit the style and production of the film, set in the era of the Untouchables.

"Sooner or Later" was composed as a 1930s-style jazz ballad with comping piano, brushed drum sounds, double bass and horns. Rooksby described the track as "conjuring the atmosphere of a smoky nightclub". Madonna sings in her lowest range as the melody shifts continuously. It opens with a "lazy" clarinet solo and portrays the singer as a kind of sexual magnet. "I always get my man", she sings "If you're on my list it's just a question of when". The song is set in the time signature of common time with a moderate tempo of 75 beats per minute. It is composed in the key of B♭ major with Madonna's voice spanning from F_{3} to B♭_{4}. The song follows a basic sequence of B♭_{9}–B♭_{6}/F–B♭_{9}–B♭_{6}/F as its chord progression. In the film, "Sooner or Later" is the signature song of Breathless and was primarily performed during a montage just after Dick Tracy has placed a microphone in Alphonse "Big Boy" Caprice's boardroom and operator.

== Critical reception ==
Lucky Lara from Manila Standard Today listed the Sondheim songs as highlights from the album, commenting how they fit Madonna's "nasal voice as a glove", and their addition to Madonna's catalogue of songs would give her "the edge in future career moves". According to Lara, with "Sooner or Later", Madonna "shows off a side to her singing that audiences haven't heard yet, and what a side it is. She proves to her critics that she isn't just the glitter and trash of the dance club scene, and that she can belt it out nearly as well as the best of them". According to Ray Boren from Deseret News "is very much a period piece, with an intimate club feel". Another positive review came from Mark Coleman from Rolling Stone, who described the song as Madonna's "breathy emotionality", observing that Madonna did not whisper the line "I always get my man", rather sang it aloud, bringing "conviction to a somewhat generic line". According to Jon Pareles of The New York Times, songs including "Sooner or Later" are "typical Sondheim, with agile wordplay and devious chromatic harmonies". At the 63rd Academy Awards held on March 25, 1991, the song won an Oscar for Best Original Song, awarded to Sondheim who did not attend the ceremony. In the award ceremony the song was listed as "Sooner or Later (I Always Get My Man)". In March 2023, Billboard ranked "Sooner or Later" as Madonna's 96th greatest ever song, with Andrew Unterberger characterizing it as "the sultry ballad worthy of her double entendre-spouting femme fatale character Breathless Mahoney..."

== Live performances ==
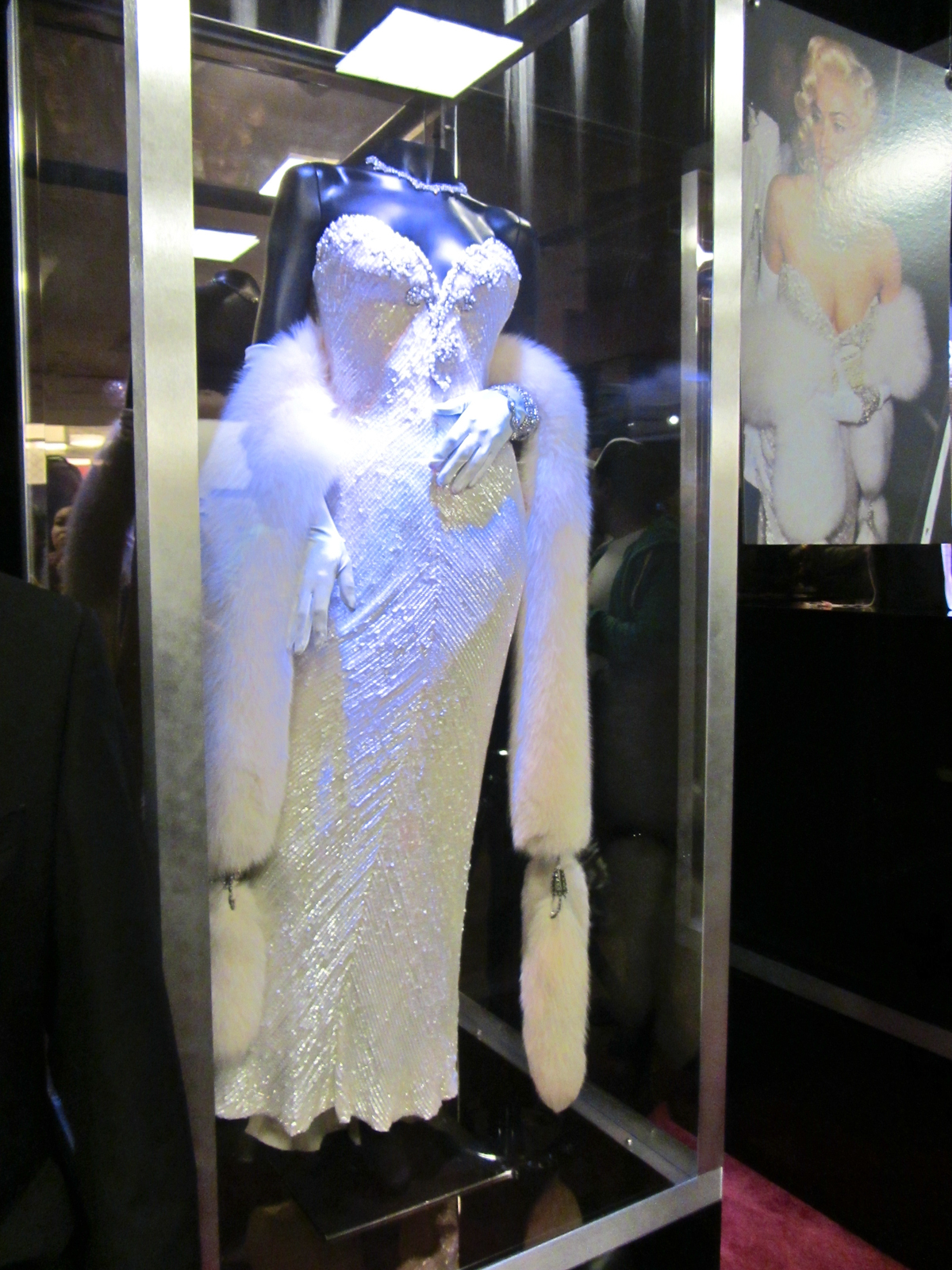
The white dress worn at the 1991 Academy Awards by Madonna

On the 1990 Blond Ambition World Tour, Madonna performed "Sooner or Later" atop of a piano, as a chanteuse in a cabaret. The wardrobe for the performance consisted of a green and white couture corset, with conical bra cups, beaded fringing and striped sequined embroidery, designed by Jean Paul Gaultier, underneath a long black robe. On his review of the concert, Richard Harrington from The Washington Post, opined Madonna "acquitted herself quite well on 'Sooner or Later'". Two different performances were taped and released on video, the Blond Ambition Japan Tour 90, taped in Yokohama, Japan, on April 27, 1990, and the Blond Ambition World Tour Live, taped in Nice, France, on August 5, 1990.

At the 1991 Academy Awards, Madonna appeared with singer Michael Jackson as her date and performed "Sooner or Later". According to journalist Liz Smith, Madonna had promised to perform at the award show if either "Sooner or Later" or "More" was nominated in the Best Original Song category. She wore a long, tight, white dress designed by Bob Mackie and covered in sequins and pearls. On her neck she wore $20 million worth of jewelry from Harry Winston. Taraborrelli recalled that Madonna had appropriated every move and mannerisms of Marilyn Monroe for the performance, making it a tribute to the actress. When she appeared onstage, there was technical difficulty resulting in the microphone not appearing from below the ground, and a stagehand passing it to her. According to Madonna's brother Christopher Ciccone, she was quite nervous during the performance; "had she been singing to an audience of screaming fans, she wouldn't have been at all nervous. But this time she was performing in an auditorium full of established actors and actresses, a group of people to which she really didn't belong, who didn't respect her as an actress but whose respect she desperately wanted to win."

Janet Maslin from The New York Times criticized Madonna's performance, saying that the singer "vamped awkwardly through [the song], managing to seem even waxier in action than she did seated beside Michael Jackson in the audience." In retrospective reviews, Billboard ranked it as the seventh "most awesome" Oscar performance of all time, saying that "Madonna gave a performance that took us back to the glamorous days of old Hollywood." Gaby Wilson from MTV News dubbed it as the Oscar performance with the best style of all time. Rolling Stone also placed it at number 17 on the magazine's list of the 20 Greatest Best Song Oscar Performances, while the Academy Awards regarded it as one of their most Memorable Music Moments.

== Covers and usage in media ==
In 2019, the song was covered in the episode "Chapter Forty-Six: The Red Dahlia" from the third season of the television series Riverdale, performed by Ashleigh Murray. In Pose, season 2, episode 6 (2019), Elektra sings "Sooner or Later" at an event hosted by Blanca and Pray Tell to raise funds and awareness for HIV-AIDS. American singer-songwriter Molly Ringwald recorded a cover of the song for her debut album Except Sometimes in 2013. It was also performed by Emma Roberts and Kim Kardashian on American Horror Story: Delicate (2023). On October 31, 2025, American singer Kelly Clarkson covered the song on The Kelly Clarkson Show as part of her Halloween special.

== Credits and personnel ==
- Madonna – lead vocals, producer
- Stephen Sondheim – writer
- Bill Bottrell – producer, engineer
- Stacy Baird – additional engineering
- Bio Espinoza – additional engineering
- John Guerin – drums
- Bob Magnusson – bass
- Bill Schneider – piano
- Bob Cooper – tenor sax
- Abe Most – alto sax, clarinet
- Mahlon Clark – clarinet
- Tony Terran – trumpet
- Charlie Loper – trombones
- Jeremy Lubbock – arrangement
- Jules Chaiken – music contractor

Credits adapted from I'm Breathless album liner notes, Sire Records and Warner Bros. Records.

== Bibliography ==
- Guilbert, Georges-Claude (2002). Madonna as Postmodern Myth. McFarland. ISBN 0-7864-1408-1.
- Hughes, David (2003). "Dick Tracy". Comic Book Movies. Virgin Books. ISBN 0-7535-0767-6.
- Morton, Andrew (2002). Madonna. Macmillan Publishers. ISBN 0-312-98310-7.
- O'Brien, Lucy (2008). Madonna: Like an Icon. Bantam Press. ISBN 978-0-552-15361-4.
- Roberts, David (2006). British Hit Singles & Albums. London: Guinness World Records Limited. ISBN 1-904994-10-5.
- Rooksby, Rikky (2004). The Complete Guide to the Music of Madonna. Omnibus Press. ISBN 0-7119-9883-3.
- Taraborrelli, Randy J. (2008). Madonna: An Intimate Biography. Simon & Schuster. ISBN 978-0-330-45446-9.
