= Dick Tracy (1990 film) =

Film by Warren Beatty

- Theatrical release poster
- Directed by: Warren Beatty
- Written by: Jim Cash; Jack Epps Jr.
- Based on: Characters by Chester Gould
- Produced by: Warren Beatty
- Starring: Warren Beatty
- Cinematography: Vittorio Storaro
- Edited by: Richard Marks
- Music by: Danny Elfman
- Production companies: Touchstone Pictures; Silver Screen Partners IV; Mulholland Productions
- Distributed by: Buena Vista Pictures Distribution
- Release dates: June 14, 1990 (Lake Buena Vista); June 15, 1990 (United States)
- Running time: 105 minutes
- Country: United States
- Language: English
- Budget: $46 million
- Box office: $162.7 million

Dick Tracy is a 1990 American crime action film based on the 1930s comic strip created by Chester Gould. Warren Beatty produced, directed and starred in the film, whose supporting cast includes Al Pacino, Madonna, Glenne Headly and Charlie Korsmo, with appearances by Dustin Hoffman, James Keane, Charles Durning, William Forsythe, Seymour Cassel, Paul Sorvino, Mandy Patinkin, Catherine O'Hara, Ed O'Ross, James Caan, James Tolkan, Michael J. Pollard, Henry Silva, R.G. Armstrong, Estelle Parsons and Dick Van Dyke. Dick Tracy depicts the detective's romantic relationships with Breathless Mahoney and Tess Trueheart, as well as his conflicts with crime boss Alphonse "Big Boy" Caprice and his henchmen. Tracy also begins fostering a young street urchin named Kid.

Development of the film began in the early 1980s with Tom Mankiewicz assigned to write the script. The screenplay was written by Jim Cash and Jack Epps Jr. The project also went through directors Steven Spielberg, John Landis, Walter Hill and Richard Benjamin before the arrival of Beatty. It was filmed mainly at Universal Studios. Danny Elfman was hired to compose the score, and the film's music was featured on three separate soundtrack albums.

Dick Tracy premiered at the Uptown Theater in Washington, D.C. on June 10, 1990, and was released nationwide five days later. Reviews ranged from favorable to mixed, with positive comments on the performances (particularly Pacino and Madonna), production design, make up effects, music, and Beatty's direction, but negative ones on the screenplay and characterization. The film was a success at the box office and with several award committees. It garnered seven Academy Award nominations, winning in three of the categories: Best Original Song, Best Makeup and Best Art Direction.

== Plot ==
In 1938, a young street kid witnesses the massacre of a group of mobsters at the hands of Flattop and Itchy, two hoods on the payroll of Alphonse "Big Boy" Caprice, who leave a bullet-riddled message for police detective Dick Tracy. After catching the Kid in an act of petty theft and rescuing him from a menacing tramp, Tracy temporarily adopts him with the help of his girlfriend, Tess Trueheart.

Meanwhile, Big Boy coerces rival mobster Lips Manlis into signing over the deed to Club Ritz, then kills Lips with a cement overcoat known as "The Bath" and steals his girlfriend, the sultry singer Breathless Mahoney. Interrogating Flattop, Itchy, and fellow hired gun Mumbles, Tracy arrests Big Boy but the evidence against him proves inconclusive. Big Boy goes free, and District Attorney John Fletcher threatens Tracy's job.

Breathless, the only witness to Lips' murder, is unwilling to testify against Big Boy and unsuccessfully attempts to seduce Tracy. He follows her to the club, where Big Boy presents the city's head criminals with a plan to unite them all under his leadership. Mob boss Spud Spaldoni refuses and is killed with a carbomb, and Tracy narrowly escapes. The next day, Big Boy and his henchmen capture Tracy and attempt to bribe him, but he rebuffs them. The criminals leave Tracy to die in a boiler explosion, but he is saved by the Kid, who receives an honorary detective certificate with badge.

The corrupt Fletcher is revealed to be in Big Boy's pocket, while Breathless visits Tracy in another attempt to seduce him, and Tess witnesses them kiss. "The Blank", a mysterious figure with no face, uses the club's piano player 88 Keys to bring Big Boy an offer to eliminate Tracy for a cut of Big Boy's profits. Tracy leads a seemingly unsuccessful raid on Club Ritz, which is actually a diversion to hide Officer "Bug" Bailey inside with a covert listening device. Listening in on Big Boy's criminal activities, Tracy and the police all but wipe out the unified criminal organization.

However, Big Boy discovers the bug and lures Tracy into an ambush, but Tracy rescues Bailey and is himself saved by the Blank. A furious Big Boy accepts the Blank's offer, while a heartbroken Tess leaves the city. In love with Tracy, Breathless agrees to testify if he gives in to her advances, but Tracy cannot bring himself to betray Tess, who has a change of heart and returns home. Tess is kidnapped by the Blank, who subdues Tracy and, with the help of 88 Keys, kills Fletcher and frames an unconscious Tracy.

With Tracy behind bars, Big Boy terrorizes the city in a lucrative crime wave while also accused of kidnapping Tess. Taken to the city orphanage, the Kid adopts the name "Dick Tracy, Jr." and reunites with Tracy, who is released by his colleagues on New Year's Eve. Interrogating Mumbles again, Tracy and the police surround Club Ritz, where the Blank has left Tess to frame Big Boy for her kidnapping. In the ensuing gun battle, Big Boy's men are killed while Big Boy takes the captive Tess hostage and escapes to a drawbridge.

Tying Tess to the gears, Big Boy is confronted by Tracy, and they are held at gunpoint by the Blank, who offers to share the city with Tracy once they kill Big Boy. Distracted by Junior, the Blank is shot by Big Boy before Tracy sends Big Boy falling down a shaft to his death. Rescuing Tess, Tracy unmasks the Blank to reveal a mortally wounded Breathless, who kisses Tracy before dying. Later, Tracy proposes to Tess but is interrupted by a police dispatch, and leaves her with the ring as he and Junior respond to the call.

== Cast ==
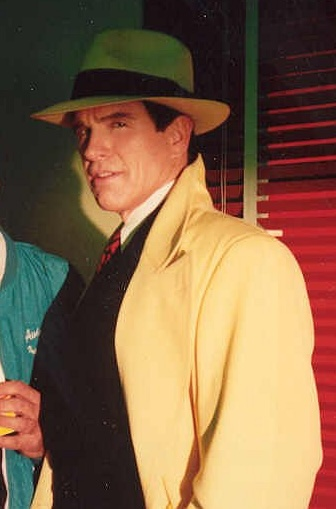
Beatty starred as the title character Dick Tracy, while also producing and directing the film.

Main characters

- Warren Beatty as Dick Tracy: a square-jawed, fast-shooting, hard-hitting, and intelligent police detective sporting a yellow overcoat and fedora. He is heavily committed to breaking the hold that organized crime has on the city. In addition, Tracy is in line to become the chief of police, which he scorns as a "desk job".
- Al Pacino as Alphonse "Big Boy" Caprice: the leading crime boss of the city. Although he is involved with numerous criminal activities, they remain unproven, as Tracy has never been able to catch him in the act or find a witness to testify.
- Madonna as Breathless Mahoney: an entertainer at Club Ritz who wants to steal Tracy from his girlfriend. She is also the sole witness to several of Caprice's crimes.
- Glenne Headly as Tess Trueheart: Dick Tracy's girlfriend. She feels that Tracy cares more for his job than for her.
- Charlie Korsmo as "The Kid": a young, scrawny street orphan who survives by eating out of garbage cans, and is a protege of Steve the Tramp. He falls into the life of both Tracy and Trueheart, and becomes an ally. He becomes Tracy's protege then, adopting the name "Dick Tracy, Jr.".

Law enforcement

- James Keane as Pat Patton: Tracy's closest associate and second-in-command
- Seymour Cassel as Sam Catchem: Tracy's closest associate and third-in-command
- Michael J. Pollard as "Bug" Bailey: a surveillance expert
- Charles Durning as Chief Brandon: the chief of police who supports Tracy's crusade
- Dick Van Dyke as District Attorney John Fletcher: a corrupt district attorney who refuses to prosecute Caprice as he is on Caprice's payroll
- Frank Campanella as Judge Harper
- Kathy Bates as Mrs. Green: a stenographer

The mob

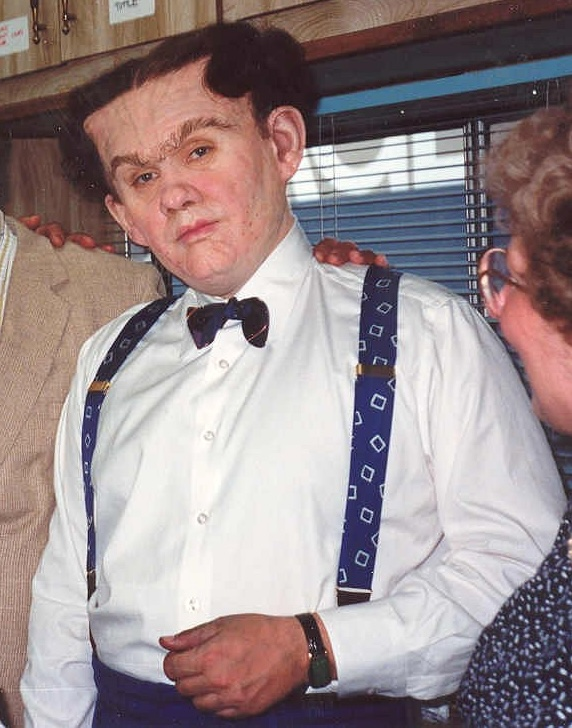
William Forsythe in costume as Flattop

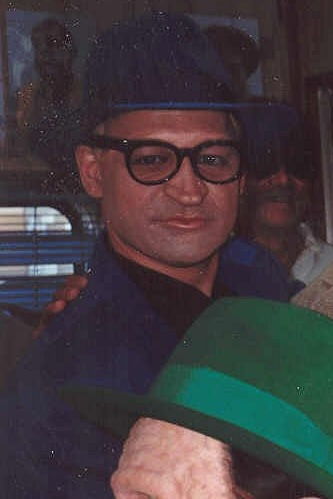
Ed O'Ross in costume as Itchy

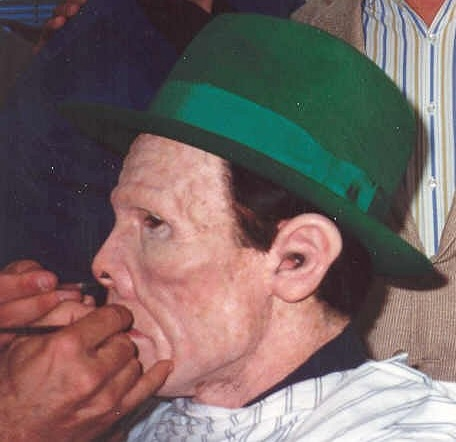
Henry Silva in costume as Influence

- Dustin Hoffman as "Mumbles": Caprice's unintelligible henchman
- William Forsythe as "Flattop": Caprice's top hitman. His most distinguishing feature is his square, flat cranium and matching haircut
- Ed O'Ross as "Itchy": Caprice's other hitman. He is usually paired with Flattop
- James Tolkan as "Numbers": Caprice's accountant
- Mandy Patinkin as "88 Keys": a piano player at Club Ritz who becomes The Blank's minion
- R. G. Armstrong as "Pruneface": a deformed crime boss who becomes one of Caprice's minions
- Henry Silva as "Influence": Pruneface's sinister top gunman
- Paul Sorvino as "Lips" Manlis: the original owner of Club Ritz and Caprice's mentor
- Chuck Hicks as "The Brow": a criminal with a large, wrinkled forehead
- Neil Summers as "Rodent": a criminal with a pointed nose, small eyes, and buck teeth
- Stig Eldred as "Shoulders": a criminal with broad shoulders
- Lawrence Steven Meyers as "Little Face": a criminal with a big head and a small face
- Jim Wilkey as "Stooge" Viller, another criminal
- James Caan as "Spud" Spaldoni: a crime boss who refuses to submit to Caprice
- Catherine O'Hara as "Texie" Garcia: a female criminal who submits to Caprice
- Robert Beecher as "Ribs" Mocca: a criminal who submits to Caprice

Others

- Rita Bland, Lada Boder, Dee Hengstler, Liz Imperio, Michelle Johnston, Karyne Ortega and Karen Russell as Breathless Mahoney's dancers at Club Ritz
- Lew Horn as "Lefty" Moriarty
- Mike Hagerty as Doorman
- Arthur Malet as Diner Patron
- Bert Remsen as The Bartender
- Jack Kehoe as Customer at Raid
- Michael Donovan O'Donnell as McGillicuddy
- Tom Signorelli as Mike: proprietor of the diner Tracy frequents
- Mary Woronov as Welfare Person

Estelle Parsons portrays Tess Trueheart's mother. Tony Epper plays Steve "The Tramp". Hamilton Camp appears as a store owner, and Bing Russell plays a Club Ritz patron. Robert Costanzo has a cameo as Lips Manlis's bodyguard, and Marshall Bell briefly appears as a goon of Big Boy Caprice who poses as an arresting officer to ensnare Lips. Allen Garfield, John Schuck and Charles Fleischer make cameos as reporters. Walker Edmiston, John Moschitta Jr. and Neil Ross provide the voices of each radio announcer. Colm Meaney appears as a police officer at Tess Trueheart's home. Mike Mazurki (who played Splitface in the original Dick Tracy film) appears in a small cameo, as Old Man at Hotel. Ninety-three-year-old veteran character actor Ian Wolfe plays his last film role as "Munger".

== Production ==
=== Development ===
Beatty had a concept for a Dick Tracy film in 1975. At the time, the film rights were owned by Michael Laughlin, who gave up his option from Tribune Media Services after he was unsuccessful in pitching Dick Tracy to Hollywood studios. Floyd Mutrux and Art Linson purchased the film rights from the Tribune in 1977, and, in 1980, United Artists became interested in financing and distributing Dick Tracy. Tom Mankiewicz was under negotiations to write the script, based on his previous success with Superman and Superman II. The deal fell through when Chester Gould, creator of the Dick Tracy comic strip, insisted on strict financial and artistic control.

That same year, Mutrux and Linson eventually took the property to Paramount Pictures, which began developing screenplays, offered Steven Spielberg the director's position, and brought in Universal Pictures to co-finance. Universal put John Landis forward as a candidate for director, courted Clint Eastwood for the title role, and commissioned Jim Cash and Jack Epps Jr. to write the screenplay. Eastwood turned down the role because he didn't see himself portraying another detective. "Before we were brought on, there were several failed scripts at Universal," reflected Epps, "then it went dormant, but John Landis was interested in Dick Tracy, and he brought us in to write it." Cash and Epps' simple orders from Landis were to write the script in a 1930s pulp magazine atmosphere, and center it with Alphonse "Big Boy" Caprice as the primary villain. For research, Epps read every Dick Tracy comic strip from 1930 to 1957. The writers wrote two drafts for Landis; Max Allan Collins, then-writer of the Dick Tracy comic strip, remembers reading one of them. "It was terrible. The only positive thing about it was a thirties setting and lots of great villains, but the story was paper-thin and it was uncomfortably campy."

In addition to Beatty and Eastwood, other actors considered for the lead role included Harrison Ford, Richard Gere, Tom Selleck and Mel Gibson. Landis left Dick Tracy following the controversial on-set accident on Twilight Zone: The Movie, in which three actors were killed. Walter Hill came on board to direct, with Joel Silver as producer. Cash and Epps wrote another draft, and Hill approached Warren Beatty for the title role. Pre-production had progressed as far as set building, but the film was stalled when artistic control issues arose with Beatty, a fan of the Dick Tracy comic strip. Hill wanted to make the film violent and realistic, while Beatty envisioned a stylized homage to the 1930s comic strip. The actor also reportedly wanted $5 million, plus fifteen percent of the box-office gross, a deal that Universal refused to accept.

Hill and Beatty left the film, which Paramount began developing as a lower-budget project, with Richard Benjamin directing. Cash and Epps continued to rewrite the script, but Universal was unsatisfied. The film rights eventually reverted to Tribune Media Services in 1985. However, Beatty decided to option the Dick Tracy rights for $3 million, along with the Cash/Epps script. When Jeffrey Katzenberg and Michael Eisner moved from Paramount to the Walt Disney Studios, Dick Tracy resurfaced, with Beatty as director, producer and leading man. Katzenberg considered hiring Martin Scorsese to direct the film, but changed his mind. "It never occurred to me to direct the movie," Beatty admitted, "but finally, like most of the movies that I direct, when the time comes to do it, I just do it because it's easier than going through what I'd have to go through to get somebody else to do it."

Beatty's reputation for directorial profligacy, notably with the critically acclaimed Reds, did not sit well with Disney. As a result, Beatty and Disney reached a contracted agreement, whereby any budget overruns on Dick Tracy would be deducted from Beatty's fee as producer, director and star. Beatty and regular collaborator Bo Goldman significantly rewrote the dialogue, but lost a Writers Guild arbitration and did not receive screen credit.

Disney greenlit Dick Tracy in 1988 under the condition that Beatty keep the production budget within $25 million. Beatty's fee was $7 million, against 15% of the gross (once the distributor's gross reached $50 million). Costs began to rise when filming started, and quickly jumped to $30 million. Its total negative cost ended up being $46.5 million ($35.6 million of direct expenditure, $5.3 million in studio overhead and $5.6 million in interest). Disney spent an additional $48.1 million on advertising and publicity, and $5.8 million on prints, resulting in a total of $101 million spent overall. The financing for Dick Tracy came from Disney and Silver Screen Partners IV, as well as Beatty's own production company, Mulholland Productions. Disney was initially going to release the film under the traditional Walt Disney Pictures banner, but instead chose to release and market the film under the adult-oriented Touchstone Pictures label leading up to the film's theatrical debut, because the studio felt it had too many mature themes for a Disney-branded film.

=== Casting ===
Although Al Pacino was Beatty's first choice for the role of Alphonse "Big Boy" Caprice, Robert De Niro was under consideration. Michelle Pfeiffer, Kathleen Turner and Kim Basinger were too expensive to cast as Breathless Mahoney. Sharon Stone auditioned for the role, but she was turned down. Madonna pursued the part of Breathless Mahoney, offering to work for scale. Her resulting paycheck for the film was just $35,000. Sean Young claims she was forced out of the role of Tess Trueheart (which eventually went to Glenne Headly) after rebuffing sexual advances from Beatty. In a 1989 statement, Beatty said, "I made a mistake casting Sean Young in the part and I felt very badly about it." Mike Mazurki, who had appeared in the earlier Dick Tracy film, had a cameo appearance. Beatty approached Gene Hackman to do a cameo in the film, but he declined.

=== Filming ===
Principal photography for Dick Tracy began February 2, 1989. The filmmakers considered shooting the film on location in Chicago, but production designer Richard Sylbert believed Dick Tracy would work better using sound stages and backlots at Universal Studios in Universal City, California. Other filming took place at Warner Bros. Studios in Burbank. In total, 53 interior and 25 exterior sets were constructed. Beatty, being a perfectionist, often filmed dozens of takes of every scene.

As filming continued, Disney and Max Allan Collins conflicted over the novelization. The studio rejected his manuscript: "I wound up doing an eleventh hour rewrite that was more faithful to the screenplay, even while I made it much more consistent with the strip," Collins continued, "and fixed as many plot holes as I could." Disney did not like this version either, but accepted based on Beatty's insistence to incorporate some of Collins's writing into the shooting script, which solved the plot hole concerns. Through post-production dubbing, some of Collins's dialogue was also incorporated into the film. Principal photography for Dick Tracy ended in May 1989. The film's production also marks the last known use of the sodium vapor process (occasionally referred to as yellowscreen).

=== Design ===
Early in the development of Dick Tracy, Beatty decided to make the film using a palette limited to just seven colors—primarily red, green, blue and yellow—to evoke the film's comic strip origins. Furthermore, each of the colors was to be exactly the same shade. Beatty's design team included production designer Richard Sylbert, set decorator Rick Simpson, cinematographer Vittorio Storaro (with whom Beatty had worked on his previous film, Ishtar, as producer and lead actor), visual effects supervisors Michael Lloyd and Harrison Ellenshaw, prosthetic makeup designers John Caglione Jr. and Doug Drexler, and costume designer Milena Canonero. Their main intention was to stay close to Chester Gould's original drawings from the 1930s. Other influences came from the Art Deco movement and German Expressionism.

For Storaro, the limited color palette was the most challenging aspect of production. "These are not the kind of colors the audience is used to seeing," he noted. "These are much more dramatic in strength, in saturation. Comic strip art is usually done with very simple and primitive ideas and emotions," Storaro theorized. "One of the elements is that the story is usually told in vignette, so what we tried to do is never move the camera at all. Never. Try to make everything work into the frame." For the matte paintings, Ellenshaw and Lloyd executed over 57 paintings on glass, which were then optically combined with the live action. For a brief sequence in which The Kid dashes in front of a speeding locomotive, only 150 feet (46 m) of real track was laid; the train was a two-foot (60 cm) scale model, and the surrounding trainyard a matte painting. The film was one of the last major American studio blockbusters to have no computer-generated imagery.

Caglione and Drexler were recommended for the prosthetic makeup designs by Canonero, with whom they had worked on The Cotton Club. The rogues gallery makeup designs were taken directly from Gould's drawings, with the exception of Al Pacino (Big Boy Caprice), who improvised his own design, ignoring the rather overweight character of the strip. His makeup took 3½ hours to apply.

=== Music ===
"Directors don't know anything about music really, and if they do, it's not necessarily a help. Warren Beatty is a pianist and knows much more about music than almost any director, but when he and I started on Dick Tracy, communicating on a musical level was getting us nowhere because it is all so interpretive. We started having much more success when we started talking on a strictly gut level."

— Danny Elfman

Beatty hired Danny Elfman to compose the film score based on his previous success with Batman. Elfman enlisted the help of Oingo Boingo bandmate Steve Bartek and Shirley Walker to arrange compositions for the orchestra. "In a completely different way," Elfman commented, "Dick Tracy has this unique quality that Batman had for me. It gives an incredible sense of non-reality." In addition, Beatty hired acclaimed songwriter Stephen Sondheim to write five original songs: "Sooner or Later (I Always Get My Man)", "More", "Live Alone and Like It", "Back in Business" and "What Can You Lose?". "Sooner or Later" and "More" were performed by Madonna, with "What Can You Lose?" being a duet with Mandy Patinkin. Mel Tormé sang "Live Alone and Like It", and "Back in Business" was performed by Janis Siegel, Cheryl Bentyne and Lorraine Feather. "Back in Business" and "Live Alone and Like It" were both used as background music during montage sequences. "Sooner or Later" and "Back in Business" were featured in the original 1992 production of the Sondheim revue, Putting It Together, in Oxford, England, and four of the five Sondheim songs from Dick Tracy (the exception being "What Can You Lose?") were used in the 1999 Broadway production of Putting It Together. A short opera sequence in the film was composed by Thomas Pasatieri.

Dick Tracy is the first film to use digital audio. In a December 1990 interview with The New York Times, Elfman criticized the growing tendency to use digital technology for sound design and dubbing purposes. "I detest contemporary scoring and dubbing in cinema. Film music as an art took a deep plunge when Dolby stereo hit. Stereo has the capacity to make orchestral music sound big and beautiful and more expansive, but it also can make sound effects sound four times as big. That began the era of sound effects over music."

== Marketing ==
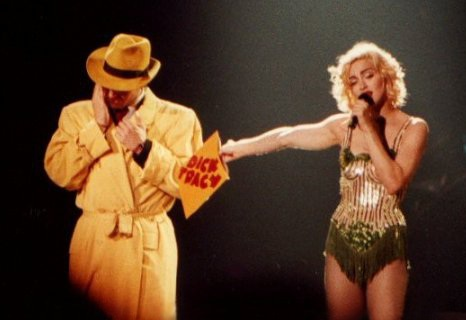
Madonna's 1990 Blond Ambition World Tour was seen as a way of promoting the film. Here she is seen performing "Now I'm Following You", from her album I'm Breathless, with a dancer dressed as Dick Tracy.

Disney modeled its marketing campaign after the 1989 success of Batman, which was based on high-concept promotion. This included a McDonald's promotional tie-in, and a Warren Beatty interview conducted by Barbara Walters on 20/20. "I find the media's obsession with promotion and demographics upsetting," Beatty said. "I find all this anti-cultural." Buena Vista Television aired a half-hour syndicated special beginning June 13, 1990, titled Dick Tracy: Behind the Badge...Behind the Scenes, with details about the making of the film.

In attempting to increase awareness for Dick Tracy, Disney added a new Roger Rabbit cartoon short ("Roller Coaster Rabbit"), and made two specific television advertisements centered on The Kid (Charlie Korsmo). In total, Disney commissioned 28 TV advertisements. Playmates Toys manufactured a line of 14 Dick Tracy figures.

It was Madonna's idea to include the film as part of her Blond Ambition World Tour. Prior to the June 1990 theatrical release, Disney had already featured Dick Tracy in musical theatre stage shows in both Disneyland and the Walt Disney World Resort, using Stephen Sondheim and Danny Elfman's music. The New York Times wrote in June 1990 of Disney Stores "selling nothing but Tracy-related merchandise".

Max Allan Collins lobbied to write the film's novelization long before Disney had even greenlighted Dick Tracy in 1988. "I hated the idea that anyone else would write a Tracy novel," Collins explained. After much conflict with Disney, leading to seven different printings of the novelization, the book was released in May 1990, published by Bantam Books. It sold almost one million copies prior to the film's release. A graphic novel adaptation of the film was also released, written and illustrated by Kyle Baker.

Reruns of The Dick Tracy Show began airing to coincide with the release of the film, but stations in Los Angeles and New York pulled and edited the episodes when Asian and Hispanic groups protested the characters Joe Jitsu and Go Go Gomez as offensive stereotypes. A theme park ride for Disneyland, Disney-MGM Studios and Euro Disney Resort called Dick Tracy's Crime Stoppers was planned but ultimately never built. Another tie-in for the movie was an ingenious plan in which 1,500 movie theaters were shipped t-shirts with the film's title art on them, which fans could buy for $12 to $20 and wear to the movie, in lieu of buying tickets at the box office. According to Jornal do Brasil, more than 100 companies sold merchandise related to the film, with Macy's reporting 1.5 million t-shirts sold, and according to New York magazine, it was perhaps McDonald's largest promotion up to that point, backed by $40 million in cash and prizes.

== Reception ==
=== Release ===
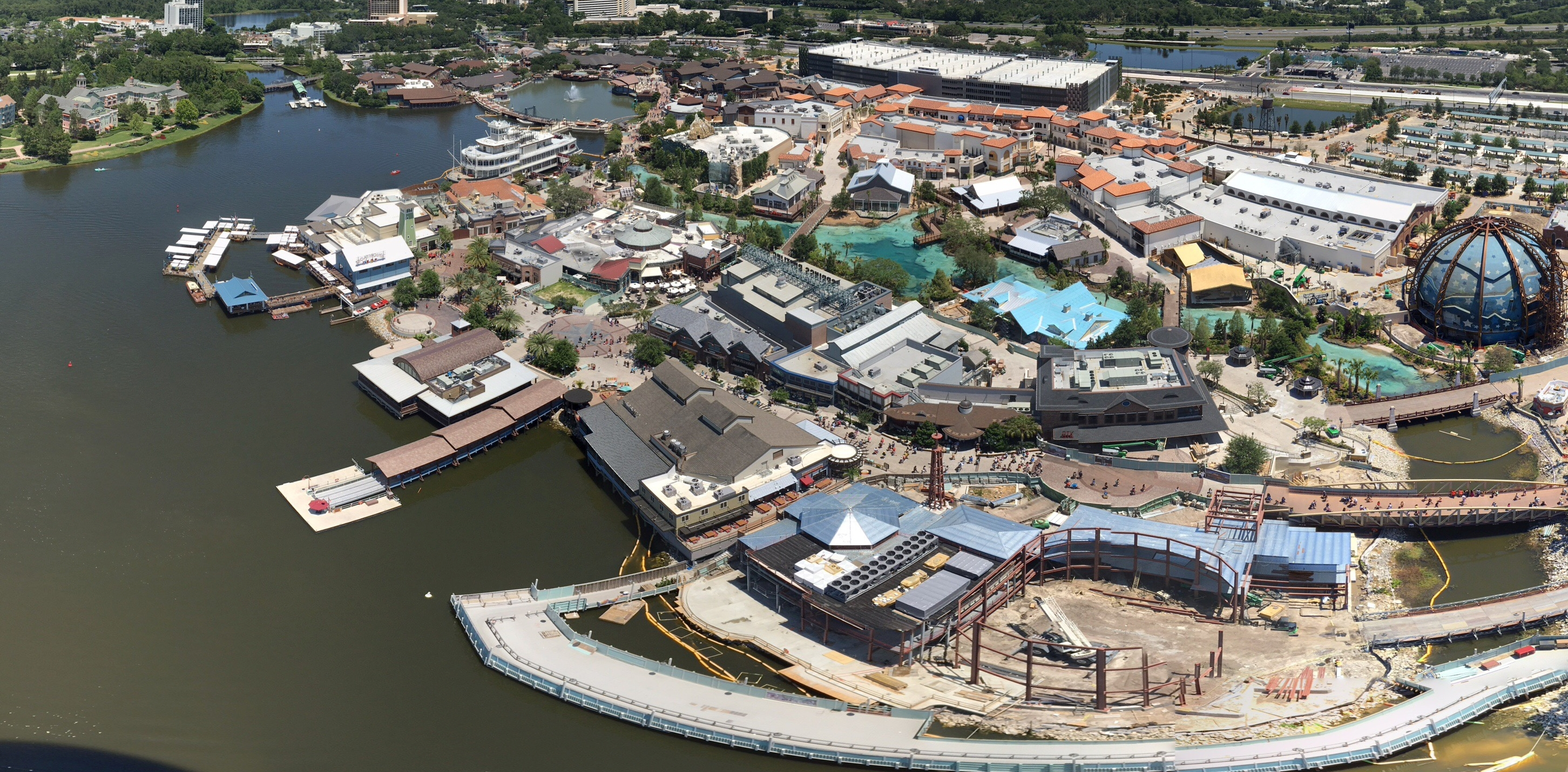
Disney Springs in Lake Buena Vista, Florida, where Dick Tracy's U.S. premiere took place June 14, 1990.

Dick Tracy had a benefit premiere at the Woodstock Theatre, a then-twin-screen theater in Woodstock, Illinois (the hometown of Tracy creator Chester Gould), on June 13, 1990, while the production premiere occurred the next day at the Walt Disney World Village's Pleasure Island in Lake Buena Vista, Florida. The film was released in the United States in 2,332 theaters June 15, 1990, earning $22.54 million in its opening weekend, including an estimated $1.5 million of t-shirt sales. This was the third-highest opening weekend of 1990, and Disney's biggest ever. The film would hold the record for having the largest opening weekend for a live-action Disney film for six years until 1996 when The Rock surpassed it. Dick Tracy eventually grossed $103.74 million in the United States and Canada, and $59 million elsewhere, coming to a worldwide total of $162.74 million. Dick Tracy was also the ninth-highest-grossing film in America in 1990, and number twelve in worldwide totals.

Although Disney was impressed by the opening weekend gross, studio management was expecting the film's total earnings to match Batman. Prior to its overseas release (and other revenue streams), the film was estimated to have generated a $57 million deficit for Disney. Studio chairman Jeffrey Katzenberg expressed disappointment in a studio memo that noted that Dick Tracy had cost about $100 million total to produce, market and promote. "We made demands on our time, talent and treasury that, upon reflection, may not have been worth it," Katzenberg reported.

When released, it was preceded by the Roger Rabbit short Roller Coaster Rabbit.

=== Critical response ===
On the review aggregator website Rotten Tomatoes, the film holds an approval rating of 63% based on 60 reviews, with an average rating of 6.4/10. The site's critics' consensus reads: "Dick Tracy is stylish, unique, and an undeniable technical triumph, but it ultimately struggles to rise above its two-dimensional artificiality." On Metacritic, the film has a weighted average score of 68 out of 100, based on 24 critics, indicating "generally favorable" reviews. Audiences polled by CinemaScore gave the film an average grade of "B+" on a scale of A+ to F.

Roger Ebert of the Chicago Sun-Times gave the film four stars out of four in his review, arguing that Warren Beatty succeeded in creating the perfect tone of nostalgia for the film. Ebert praised mostly the matte paintings, art direction and prosthetic makeup design. "Dick Tracy is one of the most original and visionary fantasies I've seen on a screen," he wrote.

Vincent Canby of The New York Times wrote, "Dick Tracy has just about everything required of an extravaganza: a smashing cast, some great Stephen Sondheim songs, all of the technical wizardry that money can buy, and a screenplay that observes the fine line separating true comedy from lesser camp."

Owen Gleiberman of Entertainment Weekly gave a mixed review, but was impressed by Madonna's performance. "Dick Tracy is an honest effort but finally a bit of a folly. It could have used a little less color and a little more flesh and blood," Gleiberman concluded.

In his heavily negative review for The Washington Post, Desson Thomson criticized Disney's hyped marketing campaign and the film in general. "Dick Tracy is Hollywood's annual celebration of everything that's wrong with Hollywood," he stated.

Peter Travers of Rolling Stone wrote that Warren Beatty, at 52 years old, was too old for the part. He also found similarities with Batman, in that both films involve "a loner hero, a grotesque villain, a blond bombshell, a marketable pop soundtrack and a no-mercy merchandising campaign", Travers continued. "But Batman possesses something else: a psychological depth that gives the audience a stake in the characters. Tracy sticks to its eye-poppingly brilliant surface. Though the film is a visual knockout, it's emotionally impoverished."

Although Max Allan Collins (then a Dick Tracy comic-strip writer) had conflicts with Disney concerning the novelization, he gave the finished film a positive review. He praised Beatty for hiring an elaborate design team, and his decision to mimic the strip's limited color palette. Collins also enjoyed Beatty's performance, the prosthetic makeup, and characterization of the rogues gallery, as well as the Stephen Sondheim music. However, he believed the filmmakers still sacrificed the storyline in favor of the visual design.

=== Accolades ===
The film was nominated for seven Academy Awards (winning three). The film is currently tied with Black Panther for having the most wins for a comic book or comic strip movie.

Award	Category	Nominee(s)	Result	Ref.
Academy Awards	Best Supporting Actor	Al Pacino	Nominated	
Academy Awards	Best Art Direction	Art Direction: Richard Sylbert; Set Decoration: Rick Simpson	Won	
Academy Awards	Best Cinematography	Vittorio Storaro	Nominated	
Academy Awards	Best Costume Design	Milena Canonero	Nominated	
Academy Awards	Best Makeup	John Caglione Jr. and Doug Drexler	Won	
Academy Awards	Best Original Song	"Sooner or Later (I Always Get My Man)"; Music and Lyrics by Stephen Sondheim	Won	
Academy Awards	Best Sound	Thomas Causey, Chris Jenkins, David E. Campbell, and Doug Hemphill	Nominated	
American Comedy Awards	Funniest Supporting Actor in a Motion Picture	Al Pacino	Won	
American Society of Cinematographers Awards	Outstanding Achievement in Cinematography in Theatrical Releases	Vittorio Storaro	Nominated	
Artios Awards	Outstanding Achievement in Feature Film Casting – Comedy	Jackie Burch	Nominated	
BMI Film & TV Awards	BMI Film Music Award	Danny Elfman	Won	
Boston Society of Film Critics Awards	Best Cinematography	Vittorio Storaro (also for The Sheltering Sky)	Won	
British Academy Film Awards	Best Actor in a Supporting Role	Al Pacino	Nominated	
British Academy Film Awards	Best Costume Design	Milena Canonero	Nominated	
British Academy Film Awards	Best Editing	Richard Marks	Nominated	
British Academy Film Awards	Best Make-Up Artist	John Caglione Jr. and Doug Drexler	Won	
British Academy Film Awards	Best Production Design	Richard Sylbert	Won	
British Academy Film Awards	Best Sound	Dennis Drummond, Thomas Causey, Chris Jenkins, David E. Campbell, and Doug Hemphill	Nominated	
British Academy Film Awards	Best Special Visual Effects		Nominated	
British Society of Cinematographers Awards	Best Cinematography in a Theatrical Feature Film	Vittorio Storaro	Nominated	
Chicago Film Critics Association Awards	Best Supporting Actor	Al Pacino	Nominated	
Dallas–Fort Worth Film Critics Association Awards	Best Supporting Actor	Al Pacino	Nominated	
Dallas–Fort Worth Film Critics Association Awards	Best Cinematography	Vittorio Storaro	Nominated	
Golden Globe Awards	Best Motion Picture – Musical or Comedy		Nominated	
Golden Globe Awards	Best Supporting Actor – Motion Picture	Al Pacino	Nominated	
Golden Globe Awards	Best Original Song – Motion Picture	"Sooner or Later (I Always Get My Man)"; Music and Lyrics by Stephen Sondheim	Nominated	
Golden Globe Awards	Best Original Song – Motion Picture	"What Can You Lose?"; Music and Lyrics by Stephen Sondheim	Nominated	
Grammy Awards	Best Instrumental Composition Written for a Motion Picture or for Television	Dick Tracy – Danny Elfman	Nominated	
Grammy Awards	Best Song Written Specifically for a Motion Picture or Television	"More" – Stephen Sondheim	Nominated	
Grammy Awards	Best Song Written Specifically for a Motion Picture or Television	"Sooner or Later (I Always Get My Man)" – Stephen Sondheim	Nominated	
Nastro d'Argento	Best Foreign Director	Warren Beatty	Nominated	
National Society of Film Critics Awards	Best Supporting Actor	Al Pacino	3rd Place	
Saturn Awards	Best Fantasy Film		Nominated	
Saturn Awards	Best Actor	Warren Beatty	Nominated	
Saturn Awards	Best Actress	Madonna	Nominated	
Saturn Awards	Best Supporting Actor	Al Pacino	Nominated	
Saturn Awards	Best Performance by a Younger Actor	Charlie Korsmo	Nominated	
Saturn Awards	Best Costumes	Milena Canonero	Nominated	
Saturn Awards	Best Make-Up	John Caglione Jr., Doug Drexler, and Cheri Minns	Won	
Young Artist Awards	Most Entertaining Family Youth Motion Picture – Comedy/Horror		Nominated	
Young Artist Awards	Best Young Actor Starring in a Motion Picture	Charlie Korsmo	Nominated	

=== Legacy ===
The film is recognized by American Film Institute in these lists:

- 2003: AFI's 100 Years...100 Heroes & Villains:
  - Dick Tracy – Nominated Hero
- 2004: AFI's 100 Years...100 Songs:
  - "Sooner or Later (I Always Get My Man)" – Nominated
- 2006: AFI's Greatest Movie Musicals – Nominated

Retrospective reviews called the film exceptionally unique. Writers for Vox and The Atlantic asserted that it was one of the most unique movies ever. Multiple authors contrast it with newer comic book movies. One article calls it a "road not taken" in comic book adaptations. The author praised Popeye, Dick Tracy and Hulk for their use of comic techniques, such as "masking, paneling, and page layout" in ways the DC Extended Universe and Marvel Cinematic Universe do not.

== Home media ==
The film was released on VHS December 18, 1990. It was first released on DVD in Europe in 2000, but domestic release in the U.S. was delayed until April 2, 2002, and without any special features. Shortly after the U.S. DVD release, rumors circulated on the Internet that Warren Beatty had planned to release a director's cut under Disney's "Vista Series" label; including at least ten extra minutes of footage. As of 1992, Dick Tracy sold 1 million copies in the U.S., according to The Hollywood Reporter.

The Blu-ray was released in the U.S. and Canada December 11, 2012. This release lacked special features, save for a digital copy.

== Possible sequel and legal issues ==
Disney had hoped Dick Tracy would launch a successful franchise, like the Indiana Jones series, but Disney halted plans. In addition, executive producers Art Linson and Floyd Mutrux sued Beatty shortly after the release of the film, alleging they were owed profit participation from the film.

Beatty purchased the Dick Tracy film and television rights in 1985 from Tribune Media Services. He took the property to Walt Disney Studios, which optioned the rights in 1988. According to Beatty, Tribune attempted to reclaim the rights in 2002, and notified Disney—but not through the process outlined in the 1985 agreement. Beatty, who commented he had "a very good idea" for a sequel, believed Tribune violated various notification procedures that "clouded the title" to the rights, and made it "commercially impossible" for him to produce a sequel. He approached Tribune in 2004 to settle the situation, but the company said it had met the conditions to get back the rights.

Disney, which had no intention of producing a sequel, rejected Tribune's claim, and gave back to Beatty most of the rights in May 2005. That same month, Beatty filed a lawsuit in the Los Angeles Superior Court, seeking $30 million in damages against Tribune and a declaration over the rights. Bertram Fields, Beatty's lawyer, said the original 1985 agreement with Tribune was negotiated specifically to allow Beatty a chance to make another Dick Tracy film. "It was very carefully done, and they just ignored it", he stated. "Tribune is a big, powerful company, and they think they can just run roughshod over people. They picked the wrong guy."

Tribune believed the situation would be settled quickly, and was confident enough to begin developing a Dick Tracy live-action television series with Lorenzo di Bonaventura, Robert Newmyer and Outlaw Productions. The TV show was to have a contemporary setting, comparable to Smallville, and Di Bonaventura commented that if the TV show was successful, a feature film would likely follow. However, an August 2005 ruling by federal judge Dean D. Pregerson cleared the way for Beatty to sue Tribune. The April 2006 hearing ended without a ruling, but in July 2006, a Los Angeles judge ruled that the case could go to trial; Tribune's request to end the suit in their favor was rejected. The legal battle between Beatty and Tribune continued. By March 2009, Tribune was in Chapter 11 bankruptcy, and lawyers for the company began to declare their ownership of television and film rights to Dick Tracy. "Mr. Beatty's conduct and wrongful claims have effectively locked away certain motion picture and television rights to the Dick Tracy property", lawyers for Tribune wrote in a filing. Fields responded that it was "a nuisance lawsuit by a bankrupt company, and they should be ashamed of themselves."

In 2010, Turner Classic Movies broadcast the Dick Tracy Special. Shot in late 2008, Beatty enlisted cinematographer Emmanuel Lubezki and film critic Leonard Maltin to make the 30-minute television special, which featured Beatty as Tracy in a retrospective interview with Maltin. Maltin explicitly asked the fictional Tracy if Warren Beatty planned to make a sequel to the 1990 film, and he responded that he had heard about that, but Maltin needed to ask Beatty himself.

On March 25, 2011, U.S. District Court Judge Dean D. Pregerson granted Beatty's request for a summary judgment, and ruled in the actor's favor. Judge Pregerson wrote in his order that "Beatty's commencement of principal photography of his television special on November 8, 2008 was sufficient for him to retain the Dick Tracy rights." Beatty's lawyer said the court found that Beatty had done everything contractually required of him to keep the rights to the character.

In June 2011, Beatty confirmed his intention to make a sequel to Dick Tracy, but he refused to discuss details. He said, "I'm gonna make another one [but] I think it's dumb talking about movies before you make them. I just don't do it. It gives you the perfect excuse to avoid making them." When asked when the sequel would get made, he replied, "I take so long to get around to making a movie that I don't know when it starts."

In April 2016, Beatty again mentioned the possibility of producing a sequel when he attended CinemaCon.

In February 2023, Turner Classic Movies aired Dick Tracy Special: Tracy Zooms In, a 30-minute television special similar to the 2010 Dick Tracy Special. The special consists mostly of a Zoom interview, featuring Beatty appearing as both Tracy and himself, opposite Ben Mankiewicz and a returning Leonard Maltin. In it, Tracy criticizes aspects of the 1990 film adaptation to Beatty's face, and suggests that a younger actor should take over the role of Tracy. It concludes with Beatty and Tracy meeting in person, and suggesting that Dick Tracy will return in the future.

Although there have not been any sequels in either television nor motion picture form, there have been sequels in novel form. Shortly after the release of the 1990 film, Max Allan Collins wrote Dick Tracy Goes to War. The story is set after the commencement of World War II, and involves Dick Tracy's enlistment in the U.S. Navy, working for their Military Intelligence Division (as he did in the comic strip). In the story, Nazi saboteurs Black Pearl and Mrs. Pruneface (Pruneface's widow) set up a sabotage/espionage operation out of Caprice's old headquarters in Club Ritz. For their activities, they recruit B.B. Eyes, The Mole and Shaky. Their reign of terror, culminating in an attempt to bomb a weapons plant, is averted by Tracy. A year after War was released, Collins wrote a third novel, titled Dick Tracy Meets His Match, in which Tracy finally follows through on his marriage proposal to Tess Trueheart.

== See also ==
- List of 1990 box office number-one films in the United States

== Bibliography ==
- Bonifer, Mike (June 1990). Dick Tracy: The Making of the Movie. New York City: Bantam Books. ISBN 0-553-34900-7.
- Hughes, David (2003). "Dick Tracy". Comic Book Movies. London: Virgin Books. ISBN 0-7535-0767-6.
- Stewart, James B. (2005). DisneyWar. New York City: Simon & Schuster. ISBN 0-684-80993-1.
- Collins, Max Allan (May 1990). Dick Tracy. Novelization of the film. Bantam Books. ISBN 978-0-553-28528-4.
