= Journey into Life: The World of the Unborn =

1990 documentary film

- Directed by: Derek Bromhall
- Production companies: ABC/Kane Productions and Genesis Films
- Distributed by: Questar Video
- Release date: 1990
- Running time: 25 minutes
- Country: United States
- Language: English

Journey into Life: The World of the Unborn is a 1990 American short documentary film directed by Derek Bromhall. It was nominated for an Academy Award for Best Documentary Short.

Journey into Life was based on Bromhall's 1988 full-length film The World of the Unborn, made for the United Kingdom's Channel 4. Clips from the movie aired on ABC's World of Discovery. The film was also released under the title Journey Into Life: The Triumph Of Creation.
