= Thomas Causey =

American sound engineer (1949–2026)

- Born: December 5, 1949; New Orleans, Louisiana, U.S.
- Died: January 11, 2026 (aged 76); Cathedral City, California, U.S.
- Occupation: Sound engineer
- Years active: 1972–2008
- Spouse(s): Maggie Reavis Causey (m. 1973–1993) Katherine Sullivan (m. 1997–2022) Christina Causey (m. 2022)

Thomas Causey (December 5, 1949 – January 11, 2026) was an American sound engineer.

== Life and career ==
Causey was born in New Orleans on December 5, 1949, and was raised in Shreveport, Louisiana. He was nominated for an Academy Award in the category Best Sound for the film Dick Tracy (1990) with Chris Jenkins, David E. Campbell, and Doug Hemphill. Causey died in Cathedral City, California, on January 11, 2026, at the age of 76.

== Selected filmography ==
- Night of the Strangler (1972)
- Fear Is the Key (1972)
- Creature from Black Lake (1976)
- Halloween (1978)
- Escape from New York (1981)
- The Thing (1982)
- Christine (1983)
- Starman (1984)
- Clue (1985)
- Big Trouble in Little China (1986)
- Broadcast News (1987)
- The Naked Gun: From the Files of Police Squad! (1988)
- Dick Tracy (1990)
- Hot Shots! (1991)
- The Fisher King (1991)
- Hoffa (1992)
- Bulworth (1998)
- Erin Brockovich (2000)
- Murder by Numbers (2002)
- Spanglish (2004)
- Reign Over Me (2007)
- You Don't Mess with the Zohan (2008)
