= J. Paul Huntsman =

American sound editor

- Born: Jeffrey Paul Huntsman; February 4, 1953; Idaho Falls, Idaho, U.S.
- Died: February 21, 2008 (aged 55); Glendale, California, U.S.
- Occupation: Sound editor

J. Paul Huntsman (February 4, 1953 – February 21, 2008) was an American sound editor. He won a British Academy Film Award in the category Best Sound for the film The Fabulous Baker Boys.

Huntsman died on February 21, 2008, at his home in Glendale, California, at the age of 55.

== Selected filmography ==
- The Fabulous Baker Boys (1989; co-won with Stephan von Hase, Chris Jenkins, Gary Alexander and Doug Hemphill)
