= The Death of Stalinism in Bohemia =

- Directed by: Jan Švankmajer
- Written by: Jan Švankmajer
- Produced by: Keith Griffiths; Michael Havas; Jaromír Kallista
- Cinematography: Svatopluk Malý
- Edited by: Marie Zemanová
- Production companies: British Broadcasting Corporation (BBC); Nomad Films; Kratky Film Praha a.s.
- Distributed by: First Run Features (USA) (theatrical); Athanor
- Release dates: 3 June 1990 (BBC Two); 13 February 1991 (USA)
- Running time: 10 minutes
- Country: United Kingdom

The Death of Stalinism in Bohemia (Czech: Konec stalinismu v Čechách) is a 1990 animated surrealist short film by Jan Švankmajer. In 1990 the BBC asked Švankmajer to make a film about situation in Czechoslovakia. Švankmajer later remarked: "Despite the fact that this film emerged along the same path of imagination as all my other films, I never pretended that it was anything more than propaganda. Therefore I think it is a film which will age more quickly than any of the others."

== Plot ==
Joseph Stalin's bust is opened on an operating table, revealing a smaller bust of Klement Gottwald, and this leads into an animated sequence which depicts Czech history from 1948, when it was taken over by Communists, to 1989, when the Velvet Revolution took place.

== Reception ==
Janet Maslin of The New York Times describes the film as being a "wonderfully apt short", and describes the plot of "rush[ing] a statue of Stalin through drastic surgery, cranks out clay workers on an assembly line only to grind them back into clay" is "droll, breakneck satire".

== Release ==
The film aired on BBC Two in the UK on 3 June 1990.
