= Rick Simpson =

American set decorator

- Occupation: Set decorator
- Years active: 1971–2006

Rick Simpson is an American set decorator. He won an Academy Award and was nominated for another one in the category Best Art Direction.

== Awards ==
Simpson won an Academy Award for Best Art Direction and was nominated for another:

Won

- Dick Tracy (1990)

Nominated

- 2010 (1984)

== Selected filmography ==
- Silent Movie (1976)
- Capricorn One (1977)
- Coma (1978)
- The Champ (1979)
- Personal Best (1982)
- Something Wicked This Way Comes (1983)
- The Star Chamber (1983)
- 2010: The Year We Make Contact (1984)
- Johnny Dangerously (1984)
- Project X (1987)
- Tequila Sunrise (1988)
- Dick Tracy (1990)
- Predator 2 (1990)
- City Slickers (1991)
- Born Yesterday (1993)
- What's Love Got to Do with It (1993)
- The Pelican Brief (1993)
- Boys on the Side (1995)
- Casino (1995)
- Sgt. Bilko (1996)
- Bulworth (1998)
- Armageddon (1998)
- Little Nicky (2000)
- Rush Hour 2 (2001)
- The Hunted (2003)
- 2 Fast 2 Furious (2003)
- Rules of Engagement (2000)
- The Black Dahlia (2006)
