= Richard Bryce Goodman =

American sound engineer

- Occupation: Sound engineer
- Years active: 1974-present

Richard Bryce Goodman is an American sound engineer. He was nominated for an Academy Award in the category Best Sound for the film The Hunt for Red October. He has worked on more than 70 films since 1974.

== Selected filmography ==
- The Hunt for Red October (1990)
