= Big Boy (Dick Tracy) =

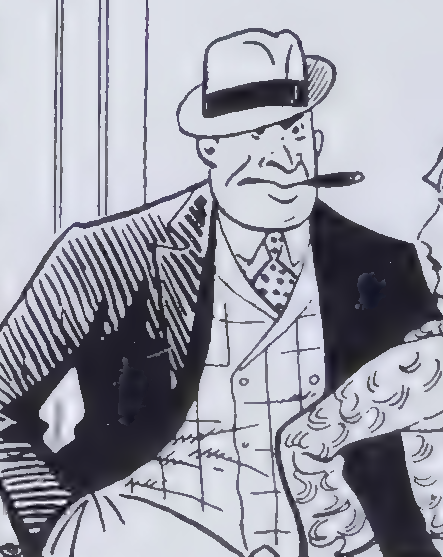
- Illustration of Big Boy by Chester Gould from the Dick Tracy strip, October 29, 1931

Publication information
- Publisher: Tribune Media Services
- First appearance: October 11, 1931
- Created by: Chester Gould

In-story information
- Supporting character of: Dick Tracy
- Abilities: Criminal Mastermind

Big Boy is a fictional gangster in the comic strip Dick Tracy, created by Chester Gould, and was the first featured in a long line of colorful Dick Tracy villains. The character was featured in the 1990 film, paired with Breathless Mahoney.

== Fictional character biography ==
Big Boy, a fictional analog for Al Capone, made his first published (though apparently not chronological) appearance in Dick Tracy's second Sunday strip (October 11, 1931). In that self-contained story, Tracy, already a member of the police department's detective bureau, leads a raid on Big Boy's nightclub in order to arrest the mobster, and is able to thwart Big Boy's escape.

On October 12, 1931, the daily strip began its run. Big Boy was the main villain in the first published daily serial of the strip. His minions rob and murder Emil Trueheart right in front of his family and Tracy, then kidnap Tess Trueheart, Tracy's girlfriend. In response, Tracy joins the Detective Bureau and becomes the thorn in the gangster's side. The events in this daily story apparently predate the events depicted in the Sunday strip of the previous day. The Sunday strips and daily strips continued to run separately for the first few months of the feature.

Big Boy was featured in several different daily continuities and Sunday stories during the early years of the strip, becoming Gould's most frequently recurring villain, and during those early years was a sort of "gray eminence" behind virtually all the criminal activity Tracy was constantly thwarting, even in stories in which he wasn't the featured villain.

== In later comics ==
The character eventually faded away until the 1970s, when Max Allan Collins revived him for one last story. By this time, Big Boy's power had faded considerably from an autocratic boss to merely one of the members of the executive council of the nationwide criminal cartel referred to, in the strip, as the Apparatus. Furthermore, his health declined seriously, to the point that he was terminally ill.

Determined to have his revenge on Tracy for ruining his power base, Big Boy creates an open contract, an offer of 1 million dollars to anyone who kills Tracy. As a result, Tracy is repeatedly attacked by amateurs. As Tracy and his partners, Sam Catchem and Lizz, take precautions and investigate, a professional criminal bomber, "Little" Littel, makes his own attempt with a car bomb. Moon Maid, Tracy's daughter-in-law and the wife of Tracy's adopted son, Junior, is killed by the bomb.

As evidence piles up that the attempts on his life are Mob-related, Tracy publicly announces that he is taking command of the Organized Crime Unit in order to retaliate. This prompts the Apparatus board to confront Big Boy and tell him that they will not tolerate something so brazen with such serious consequences as attempting to murder police officers. To stop the contract, and since threatening a dying man is useless, the Apparatus sets up their own 1 million dollar open contract on anyone who collects - or even tries to collect - on Big Boy's.

With the contract neutralized, Big Boy resorts to an elite hitman, Johnny "the Iceman" Snow, to murder Tracy. With the promise of a foreign home to escape the Apparatus' reprisal, and an extra 1 million dollars on top of the original bounty, the Iceman makes his attempt and eventually fails. Fatally wounded, the Iceman tells Tracy about Big Boy's machinations before he dies.

Tracy comes to Big Boy's home to arrest him for murder. Upon hearing of Tracy's arrival and intentions, the ganglord flies into a fit of rage that ultimately kills him due to a heart attack.

In late 1990, a young gangster calling himself "Little Boy" arrives in Tracy's city with the intention of resurrecting Big Boy's criminal empire, claiming to be his grandson. To this end, he buys and renovates the abandoned hotel Big Boy once ran his empire from, and recruits Hi-Top and Restless Mahoney, the descendants of notorious criminals Flattop Jones and Breathless Mahoney, respectively. However, after his plan is foiled, it is revealed that Little Boy had no previous relationship to Big Boy at all, and had simply used his legacy for his own personal gain.

In a short, two-week sequence written by the strip's former police technical advisor, Jim Doherty, and run between 28 April 2019 and 5 May 2019, Big Boy is referred to as "Gabe Famoni," and it is asserted that, not only was he assisted by a brother, "Sal Famoni" (apparently a fictional analogue for Frank Capone), but that "Cut" and "Muscle" Famon, the villains from a 1935 sequence in which Tracy was hired as a reform police chief for the gangster-ridden suburb of "Homeville," were both half-brothers of Big Boy's. The name "Alphonse Caprice" has never been adopted in the strip, and, since it is original to the film, it was not clear whether or not the name given to the character in the film was the property of the syndicate or the Disney film company. Accordingly, with the approval of the regular creators, Doherty gave the character an official real name.

== In other media ==
Al Pacino as "Big Boy" Caprice in the 1990 film adaptation

In the 1990 film adaptation of the comic strip, Big Boy is played by Al Pacino in an Academy Award-nominated performance. It is in this film that Big Boy is first referred to as "Alphonse 'Big Boy' Caprice." The "Caprice" name has never been used in the comic strip. The movie character is physically very different from the comic strip character.

In the film, Big Boy Caprice is the former protégé of crime lord Lips Manlis (Paul Sorvino), whom he eventually murders after rising to power. He takes over Manlis' empire, prompting Tracy (Warren Beatty) to make the diminutive gangster's destruction his own personal mission. Caprice's moll, Breathless Mahoney (Madonna), takes a sexual interest in Tracy; for his part, Tracy is tempted by the smoldering femme fatale, even though he is faithful to his longtime girlfriend Tess Trueheart.

By the end of the film, Tracy has unraveled Caprice's empire, with help from a mysterious, faceless vigilante called "the Blank" (later revealed to be Breathless in disguise). Caprice kidnaps Tess, and holds her hostage in a tower containing the operating machinery of a drawbridge. Tracy then punches Caprice over a ledge and into the deep gearwell of the bridge.

Big Boy is the main antagonist in the comic miniseries Dick Tracy: Dead or Alive, where he runs virtually all crime in Chicago. Upon the election of a new governor, Big Boy plans to hire Dick Tracy to head the police force and plans to kill the new governor eventually, only for this to backfire on him and lead to his arrest.
