= David E. Campbell (sound engineer) =

American sound engineer

- Occupation: Sound engineer
- Years active: 1977–2007

David E. Campbell is an American sound engineer. He won an Academy Award for Best Sound and has been nominated for five more in the same category. He has worked on over 160 films since 1977.

== Selected filmography ==
Campbell won an Academy Award for Best Sound and has been nominated for another five:

Won

- The Matrix (1999)

Nominated

- Dick Tracy (1990)
- Legends of the Fall (1994)
- The Perfect Storm (2000)
- Pirates of the Caribbean: The Curse of the Black Pearl (2003)
- Flags of Our Fathers (2006)
