= Dick Tracy (disambiguation) =

Dick Tracy is a comic strip.

Dick Tracy may also refer to:

- Dick Tracy (character), lead character from Dick Tracy comic strip

== Radio and television ==
- Dick Tracy (radio series)
- The Dick Tracy Show
- Dick Tracy (TV series)

== Film ==
- Dick Tracy (serial)
- Dick Tracy (1945 film)
- Dick Tracy (1990 film)
- Dick Tracy Meets Gruesome
- Dick Tracy vs. Cueball
- Dick Tracy's Dilemma

== Other ==
- Dick Tracy (soundtrack)
- Dick Tracy (video game)
- Richard Tracey, British politician
- Dick Tracey (racing driver), American stock car racing driver
