= Dick Tracy's Dilemma =

1947 film by John Rawlins

- Theatrical Poster
- Directed by: John Rawlins
- Screenplay by: Robert Stephen Brode
- Based on: Dick Tracy; 1931- comic strip by Chester Gould
- Produced by: Herman Schlom
- Starring: Ralph Byrd; Lyle Latell; Kay Christopher
- Cinematography: Frank Redman
- Edited by: Marvin Coil
- Music by: Paul Sawtell
- Distributed by: RKO Radio Pictures
- Release date: July 12, 1947 (U.S.)
- Running time: 60 minutes
- Country: United States
- Language: English

Dick Tracy's Dilemma, released in the United Kingdom as Mark of the Claw, is a 1947 American action film based on the 1930s comic-strip character of the same name created by Chester Gould. Ralph Byrd stars as Dick Tracy, reprising the role after Republic Pictures's 1937 Dick Tracy serial and its three sequels. Preceded by Dick Tracy vs. Cueball, the film is the third installment of the Dick Tracy film series released by RKO Radio Pictures.

The follow-up to Dick Tracy's Dilemma was Dick Tracy Meets Gruesome (1947), the fourth and last entry in the RKO series. Dick Tracy, the character next made the move to television. The program ran for 39 episodes in the 1950–1951 season. Ralph Byrd might have played Dick Tracy in further adventures had he not died unexpectedly, of a heart attack, on August 18, 1952, at age 43.

== Plot ==
Ruthless killer Steve Michel is known to the public as "the Claw" for his way of killing his victims with his prosthetic hook. After his accomplices Ryan and Taylor have broken in and stolen furs from the Flawless Furs warehouse, Steve kills the guard with his hook. Detective Dick Tracy arrives and talks to the store owner Humphries, Peter Premium, a representative for the insurance company, and Cudd the insurance investigator. The insurance company only has 24 hours to find the stolen goods, or they have to reimburse the fur company. Tracy and his assistant Patton examine the dead body at the morgue and find a note on it stating that three perpetrators performed the hit against the warehouse. It also mentions that they used a truck with the name "Daisy" on it. The three perpetrators disguise the truck before Tracy can find it, and the lead is a dead end. The robbers soon leave their hideout in a local junkyard and go to a nearby bar to phone their boss and get new instructions. As they speak with the boss on the phone, their conversation is overheard by an informant, a blind beggar called Sightless, who goes to pass the information on. Sightless is sloppy when eavesdropping, and is nearly caught by the Claw but manages to escape the bar.

Sightless goes directly to Dick Tracy, but is stopped at the door by Tracy's friend, Vitamin Flintheart. Vitamin believes the beggar is up to no good, and denies him entrance to the house. After listening to Sightless' message, Vitamin gets rid of him. Still, he passes the message on to Tracy later, and Tracy and Patton manage to find the fence whom the three robbers were meeting, Longshot Lillie. Lillie is taken into custody and questioned, but is unable to identify the robbers. At the same time, the Claw finds Sightless' apartment and kills the blind man with his hook. Soon after, Tracy and Patton arrive, and the Claw flees the scene. Patton pursues the killer, fires a shot and wounds him, but the Claw manages to escape.

Tracy notices that the Claw had tried to make a phone call from Sightless' phone, and can identify the first digits from hook scratches on the phone dial. He sends Patton to find the rest of the phone number. Tracy himself goes to the insurance company and accuses them of stealing the furs from the warehouse. They protest against the charges when Patton arrives and tells them that the number leads to the storeowner Humphries. Humphries' plan was all along to sell back the furs to the insurance company after the 24 hours had passed and collect the penalty fee stated in the policy. He calls the robbers at the same bar as before, instructing them to tell the insurance company to come to the bar with $50,000. Feeling guilty about sending Sightless off to a certain death before, Vitamin goes to the bar to find the killer, pretending to be a blind beggar himself. Sam and Fred make an attempt to steal the money for themselves, but the Claw, wounded but still capable of fighting, manages to kill them both. The killings are witnessed by Vitamin, who also hears the Claw talk on the phone to Humphries, telling him the furs' whereabouts.

Meanwhile, Patton and Cudd have gone to Humphries and are watching him as he talks to the Claw. Humphries tells the Claw over the phone about his predicament, and the Claw becomes suspicious towards Vitamin and his blind-beggar performance. Tracy arrives to the bar just in time to save his friend from the Claw, and a chase back down to the junkyard happens. Tracy chases the Claw to a high-voltage generator, and the killer is killed by an electric shock when he touches a wire with his hook.

== Cast ==
- Ralph Byrd as Dick Tracy
- Kay Christopher as Tess Trueheart
- Lyle Latell as Pat Patton
- Jack Lambert as Steve "the Claw" Michel
- Ian Keith as Vitamin Flintheart
- Bernadene Hayes as Longshot Lillie
- Jimmy Conlin as Sightless
- William B. Davidson as Peter Premium
- Tony Barrett as Sam
- Tom Keene as Fred (as Richard Powers)
- Alan Bridge as Mr. Cudd (uncredited)
