= Dick Locher =

American syndicated cartoonist (1929–2017)

- Born: Richard Earl Locher; June 4, 1929 Dubuque, Iowa
- Died: August 6, 2017 (aged 88) Naperville, Illinois
- Area: Cartoonist
- Notable works: Dick Tracy
- Awards: Pulitzer Prize, Editorial Cartooning (1983)

Richard Earl Locher (June 4, 1929 – August 6, 2017) was an American syndicated cartoonist.

== Early life and career ==
Locher was born in Dubuque, Iowa. After high school, he studied at Loras College before studying art at the University of Iowa. He then graduated with honors from the Chicago Academy of Fine Arts.

While in Chicago, he became an assistant to Rick Yager, who was drawing Buck Rogers at the time. However, he left the job after a few months to enlist in the Air Force during the Korean War, where he became a test pilot and later was given an Honorable Discharge as Captain. While at the Air Force, he began freelancing for the Stars and Stripes.

In 1957, he began assisting Chester Gould on Dick Tracy, where he inked the figures and colored the Sunday strips. He also contributed to a story that was cited in Gould's 1959 Reuben award. He left the strip in 1961 to work on other areas, including starting an advertising company, where he worked on designing characters for McDonald's.

Locher kept in touch with Chester Gould even after leaving the strip. In 1973, an editorial cartoonist position at the Chicago Tribune opened up and Gould recommended Locher to take the position. Despite having no experience in editorial cartooning, the Tribune hired Locher. Locher retired May 1, 2013.

Locher, working with his son John, returned to work on Dick Tracy in 1983, when its previous cartoonist, Rick Fletcher, died. That same year, he won the Pulitzer Prize for Editorial Cartooning. In 2009, Jim Brozman took over the drawing of Dick Tracy; however Locher continued to write the storylines and contributed sketches. In 2011, Locher retired from Dick Tracy and handed the reins to the new creative team of Mike Curtis and Joe Staton. Locher's last Dick Tracy strip was published Sunday, March 13, 2011.

Dick got honorary doctorates from Benedictine University and Loras College. He was a long-tenured trustee of Benedictine University in Lisle, Illinois.

In 2006, Locher was inducted into the Oklahoma Cartoonists Hall of Fame in Pauls Valley, Oklahoma by Michael Vance. The Oklahoma Cartoonists Collection, created by Vance, is located in the Toy and Action Figure Museum. In 2008, he was inducted to the Fox Valley Arts Hall of Fame.

In 2013, Locher helped design and make a 9.5-foot bronze statue of Naperville's founding father, Capt. Joseph Naper. He also designed the Land of Lincoln Trophy, awarded to the winner of the Northwestern-Illinois college football game.

Throughout his career, Locher published over 10,000 cartoons.

== John Locher Memorial Award ==
Dick Locher's son, John, who was also a cartoonist, died in 1986 at the age of 25. The same year, while appearing at the 1986 Ohio Comic Con at Ohio State University, Hy Rosen, Albany Times Union cartoonist, and Andy Donato, Toronto Sun cartoonist, both of the Association of American Editorial Cartoonists, suggested the John Locher Award to recognize aspiring college-age cartoonists in remembrance of Locher's son, who helped him on Dick Tracy. The first award competition was launched in 1987.

== Personal life ==
Locher married Mary (née Cosgrove) in 1957. In 1969, they moved to Naperville, Illinois, where they lived until his death.

They had three children: Stephen, who lives in the Chicago area; John, who died in 1986 at age 25; and Jana, who lives in Colorado.

Locher died on August 6, 2017, in Naperville, Illinois, aged 88. His death was caused by complications from Parkinson's disease.

== Awards ==
- Scripps Howard Institute Award for Conservation, 1975
- Sigma Delta Chi Award, Distinguished Service Award for outstanding contributions to journalism and research (Editorial Cartoon), 1982
- Pulitzer Prize for Editorial Cartooning, 1983
- Overseas Press Club Award, Thomas Nast Award, 1982 and 1983
- Peter Lisagor Award
- John Fischetti Editorial Cartoon Award, 1987
- National Cartoonist Society Silver T-Square Award, 2006

Preceded by Rick Fletcher	Dick Tracy artist 1983-2009	Succeeded by Himself (pencils) and Jim Brozman (inks)
Preceded by Himself	Dick Tracy artist (pencils, with Jim Brozman inking); 2009-2011	Succeeded by Joe Staton
Preceded by Mike Kilian	Dick Tracy writer 2005-2011	Succeeded by Mike Curtis
