= Dick Tracy =

American comic strip starting 1931

- Chester Gould's Dick Tracy vs. "the Blank" (January 2, 1938)
- Author(s): Chester Gould (original); Mike Curtis (current writer); Howie Noel (current artist)
- Website: https://tribunecontentagency.com/premium-content/comics/dick-tracy/
- Current status/schedule: Running
- Launch date: October 4, 1931; 95 years ago
- Syndicate: Tribune Content Agency
- Genre(s): Action-adventure, crime

Dick Tracy is an American comic strip featuring Dick Tracy, a tough and intelligent police detective created by Chester Gould. It made its debut on Sunday, October 4, 1931, in the Detroit Mirror, and was distributed by the Chicago Tribune New York News Syndicate. Gould wrote and drew the strip until 1977, and various artists and writers have continued it.

Dick Tracy has also been the hero in a number of films, including Dick Tracy (1990) in which Warren Beatty played the lead.

Tom De Haven praised Gould's Dick Tracy as an "outrageously funny American Gothic", while Brian Walker described it as a "ghoulishly entertaining creation" which had "gripping stories filled with violence and pathos".

== Comic strip ==
=== Creation and early years ===
Basing the character on U.S. federal agent Eliot Ness, Gould drafted an idea for a detective named "Plainclothes Tracy" and sent it to Joseph Medill Patterson of the Chicago Tribune New York News Syndicate. Patterson suggested changing the hero's name to Dick Tracy, and he also put forward an opening storyline in which Tracy joined the police after his girlfriend's father was murdered by robbers. Gould agreed to these ideas, and Dick Tracy was first published on October 4, 1931. The strip was instantly popular and was soon appearing in newspapers across the United States. The strip's popularity also resulted in the creation of numerous Dick Tracy merchandise, including novelizations, toys, and games. In April 1937, a poll of adult comic strip readers in Fortune voted Dick Tracy their third favorite comic strip after Little Orphan Annie and Popeye. However, Dick Tracy was also attacked by some journalists as being too violent, a criticism that would dog Gould throughout his time on the strip.

=== Evolution of the strip ===
Dick Tracy and the famous 2-Way Wrist Radio.

On January 13, 1946, the Two-Way Wrist Radio was introduced; it would become one of the strip's most immediately recognizable icons. This radio wristwatch, worn by Tracy and members of the police force, inspired Al Gross' invention of several hand held communications and may have inspired later smartwatches. The Two-Way Wrist Radio was upgraded to a Two-Way Wrist TV in 1964. This development also led to the introduction of an important supporting character, Diet Smith, an eccentric industrialist who financed the development of this equipment.

In late 1948, with the death of Joseph Medill Patterson, the strip went through several revisions of the characters: a botched security detail personally overseen by Chief Brandon allowed the villain Big Frost (a caricature of Patterson) to murder the semi-regular character Brilliant, the blind inventor of the Two-Way Wrist Radio (among other devices) whereupon Chief Brandon, Dick Tracy's superior on the police force and a presence in the strip since 1931, resigned in shame and Pat Patton (the o in this surname has since been replaced by an e) was promoted to police chief in Brandon's place on Tracy's recommendation after declining promotion himself, previously having been Tracy's buffoonish partner. A new character was introduced in December of 1948 named Sam Catchem to take Patton's place as Tracy's sidekick.

=== The 1950s ===
In 1949, Spike Jones was caricatured in the Dick Tracy dailies as Spike Dyke

Gould introduced topical story lines about television, juvenile delinquency, graft, organized crime, and other developments in American life during the 1950s; elements of soap opera depicted Dick, Tess, and Junior (along with the Tracys' baby daughter Bonnie Braids) at home as a family. Depictions of family life alternated with the story's crime drama, as in the kidnapping of Bonnie Braids by fugitive Crewy Lou, or Junior's girlfriend Model being accidentally killed by her brother.

Gould incurred some controversy when he had Tracy live in an unaccountably ostentatious manner on a police officer's salary, and he responded with a story wherein Tracy was accused of corruption and had to explain the origin of his possessions in detail. In his book-length examination of the strip, Dick Tracy – The Official Biography, Jay Maeder suggested that Gould's critics were unsatisfied by his explanation. Nevertheless, the controversy eventually faded, and the cartoonist reduced exposure to Tracy's home life.

Tracy's cases generally incriminated independent operators rather than organized crime—with a few exceptions, such as Big Boy, a fictionalized version of Al Capone and the strip's first villain. Tracy contended with a series of big-time mobsters in the 1950s, such as the King, George "Mr. Crime" Alpha, Odds Zonn, and Willie "The Fifth" Millyun, after events like the Kefauver Hearings. As Tess faded into the background, Tracy took, as his assistant, the rookie policewoman Lizz Worthington, a photographer who becomes a highly capable police officer, which was a rare female character type for its time.

From 1956 to 1964, the Dick Tracy Sunday page was accompanied by a topper humor strip called The Gravies and drawn by Gould and his assistants.

The 1950s are often considered the strip's artistic and commercial prime, which is thought to come to an end with the 1959 story with the villains The Fifth and his colleague, Flyface. In that story, The Fifth was Gould's criticism of the constitutional right to silence with the gangster invoking that right for any question, while his cohort and legal representation, Flyface, was a caricature of lawyers as a repellent man constantly swarmed by flies as was most of his family as well. In that story, Gould's creative weaknesses began to become more obvious with his vitriolic overlong condemnation of the rights of the accused and any new restraint on police practices no matter how justified, while his grotesque style for his villain characters began to alienate contemporary readers enough to prompt newspapers to drop the strip.

=== Space period ===
As technology progressed, the methods that Tracy and the police used to track and capture criminals took the form of increasingly fanciful atomic-powered gadgets developed by Diet Smith Industries. This eventually led to the 1960s advent of the Space Coupe, a spacecraft with a magnetic propulsion system. This marked the beginning of the strip's "Space Period," which saw Tracy and friends having adventures on the Moon and meeting Moon Maid, the daughter of the leader of a race of humanoid people living in "Moon Valley" in 1964. After an eventual sharing of technological information, Moon technology became standard issue on Tracy's police force, including air cars, flying cylindrical vehicles. The villains became even more exaggerated in power, resulting in an escalating series of stories that no longer resembled the urban crime drama roots of the strip. During this period, Tracy met famed cartoonist Chet Jade, creator of the comic strip Sawdust, in which the only characters are talking dots.

One of the new characters, Mr. Intro, was only manifested as a disembodied voice. His goal was world domination in the vein of a James Bond villain. Tracy eventually used an atomic laser beam to annihilate Intro and his island base.

Junior married Moon Maid in October 1964. Their daughter Honey Moon Tracy had antennae and magnetic hands. In the spring of 1969, Tracy was offered the post of Chief of Police in Moon Valley. However, he ended up back on Earth when the Apollo 11 mission in 1969 showed that the moon was barren of all life. Many of the accoutrements of the space period stories remained for many years afterward, such as the Space Coupe and much of the high-tech gadgetry. Moon Maid receded from the storyline.

The stories of this period took an increasingly condemnatory tone pertaining to contemporary court decisions concerning the rights of the accused, which often involved Tracy being frustrated by legal technicalities. For example, having caught a gang of diamond thieves red-handed, Tracy was forced to let them walk because he could not prove beyond a reasonable doubt that the diamonds were stolen. As he saw the thieves get off without penalty, Tracy was heard to grumble, "Yes, under today's interpretation of the laws, it seems it's the police who are handcuffed!"

The strip was criticized for advocating violence. For instance, Moon Maid, incensed at a woman being attacked by a criminal and no one helping her in an obvious reference of the Murder of Kitty Genovese, becomes a mysterious murderous vigilante to Dick Tracy's open approval in violation of his profession's ethics In 1968. On June 7 — the day after Senator Robert F. Kennedy was killed by an assassin — the strip's final panel announced, "Violence is golden, when it's used to put down evil." The strip was obviously prepared weeks before the assassination, but the timing of the strip's publication attracted negative attention. Some newspapers dropped the strip as a result. From 1960 to 1974, the strip's newspaper coverage dropped from 550 to roughly 375.

=== 1970s ===
Color guide for Dick Tracy (March 8, 1970)

In the 1970s, Gould modernized Tracy by giving him a longer hairstyle and a mustache and added a hippie sidekick, Groovy Grove, to appeal to young audiences. Groovy's first appearance in print, as it happened, occurred during the same week as the Kent State shootings. Groovy remained with the strip on and off until his death in 1984.

Shortly before his retirement, Gould drew a strip in which Sam, Lizz, and Groovy held Tracy down to shave off his mustache.

At this time, the standard publication size and space of newspaper comics was sharply reduced; for example, the Dick Tracy Sunday strip, which had traditionally been a full-page episode containing 12 panels, was cut in size to a half-page format that offered, at most, eight panels—these new restrictions created challenges for all comic artists.

=== Plenty family ===
The Plenty family was a group of goofy redneck yokels headed by the former villain Bob Oscar ("B.O."), along with Gertrude ("Gravel Gertie") Plenty. Gravel Gertie was introduced as the unwitting dupe of the villain the Brow, who was on the run from Dick Tracy. The family provided a humorous counterpoint to Tracy's adventures. The Plenty sub-story was decades long and saw Sparkle Plenty grow from an infant to a young married lady, eventually becoming a beautiful fashion model. Sparkle Plenty's 30 May 1947 birth became a significant mainstream media event, with spinoff merchandising and magazine coverage.

The Plenty family appeared with Tracy in a story that occurred in a bank, where "B.O." found a way to prevent thieves from snatching an envelope of money from a counter.

In the 24 April 2011 strip, B.O. and Gertie had a second child, Attitude, a boy who is as ugly as Sparkle is beautiful. His face has yet to be shown.

=== Crimestoppers' Textbook ===
Beginning September 11, 1949, the Sunday strip included a frame devoted to a page from the "Crimestoppers' Textbook", a series of handy illustrated hints for the amateur crime-fighter. This was named after a short-lived youth group seen in the strip during the late 1940s, led by Junior Tracy, called "Dick Tracy's Crimestoppers." This feature ended when Gould retired from the strip in 1977, but Max Allan Collins reinstated it, and it is still part of the strip. After Gould's retirement, Collins initially replaced the Textbook with "Dick Tracy's Rogues Gallery," a salute to memorable Tracy villains of the past.

=== After Gould ===
Chester Gould retired from comics in 1977; his last Dick Tracy strip appeared in print on Sunday, December 25 (Christmas Day) of that same year. The following Monday, Dick Tracy was taken over by Max Allan Collins and longtime Gould assistant Rick Fletcher. Gould's name remained in the byline for a few years after his retirement as a story consultant.

In one of Collins' first stories as the strip's writer, the gangster known as "Big Boy" learned that he was dying and had less than a year to live. Big Boy was still seeking revenge on Tracy, who had sent him up the river to prison, and he wanted to live just long enough to see Tracy's death. He put out an open $1 million contract on Tracy, knowing that every small-time hood in the city would take a crack at the famous cop for that amount of money. One of the would-be collectors rigged Tracy's car to explode, but inadvertently killed Moon Maid instead of Tracy in the explosion. A funeral strip for Moon Maid explicitly stated that this officially severed all ties between Earth and the Moon in the strip, thus eliminating the last remnants of the Space Period. Honeymoon received a new hairstyle that covered her antennae and she was ultimately phased out of the strip. Junior later married Sparkle Plenty (the daughter of B.O. and 'Gravel' Gertie Plenty), and they had a daughter named Sparkle Plenty Jr. Sparkle had been divorced by her cartoonist husband Vera Aldid, who was thus also removed from the cast. Collins felt that their original marriages were a mistake on Gould's part. In the 1990s, Tracy's son Joseph Flintheart Tracy took on a role similar to Junior's in the earlier strips.

In addition, Collins removed other Gould creations of the 1960s and 1970s (including Groovy Grove, who was gravely wounded in the line of duty and later died in the hospital; Lizz married him before his death). On a more philosophical level, Collins took a generally less cynical view of the justice system than Gould; Tracy came to accept its limitations and requirements as a normal part of the process which he could manage. Extreme technology was phased out, such as the Space Coupe, in favor of more realistic advanced tools such as the Two-Way Wrist Computer in 1987.

New semi-regular characters introduced by Collins and Fletcher included: Dr. Will Carver, a plastic surgeon with underworld ties who often worked on known felons; Wendy Wichel, a smarmy newspaper reporter/editorialist with a strong anti-Tracy bias in her articles; and Lee Ebony, an African-American female detective. Vitamin Flintheart reappeared occasionally as a comic-relief figure, the aged ham actor created by Gould in 1944 who had not been seen in the strip for almost three decades. The Plenty family (B.O., Gravel Gertie, and Sparkle) were also brought back as semi-regulars.

Original villains seen during this period included Angeltop (the revenge-seeking, psychopathic daughter of the slain Flattop), Torcher (whose scheme was arson-for-profit), and Splitscreen (a video pirate). Collins brought back at least one "classic" Gould villain or revenge-seeking family member per year. The revived Gould villains were often provided with full names and marriages, as well as children, and other family connections were developed, bringing more humanity to many of the originally grotesque brutes. "Flattop", particularly, had a number of relatives, all with his characteristic head structure and facial attributes, who turned up one by one to avenge their ancestor on Tracy.

Rick Fletcher died in 1983 and was succeeded by editorial cartoonist Dick Locher, who had assisted Gould on the strip in the late 1950s and early 1960s. Locher was assisted by his son John, who died in 1986.

Max Allan Collins was fired from the strip in 1992, following a financial reorganization of their comic strip holdings, and Tribune staff writer and columnist Mike Kilian took over the writing. Kilian continued until his death on October 27, 2005.

=== 2000s ===
Dick Locher was both author and artist for over three years, beginning on January 9, 2006. On March 16, 2009, Jim Brozman began collaborating with Locher, taking over the drawing duties while Locher continued to write the strip.

In 2005, Tracy was a guest at Blondie and Dagwood's 75th anniversary party in the comic strip Blondie. Later, Dick Tracy appeared in the comic strip Gasoline Alley.

On January 19, 2011, Tribune Media Services announced that Locher was retiring from the strip and handing the reins to artist Joe Staton and writer Mike Curtis. The new creative team has previously worked together on Scooby-Doo, Richie Rich, and Casper the Friendly Ghost. Their first Dick Tracy strip was published March 14, 2011. Until Staton's retirement in October 2021, Staton and Curtis were assisted by Shelley Pleger, who inked and lettered Staton's drawings, along with Shane Fisher, who provides the coloring on the Sunday strips. After Staton's retirement, Pleger took over his artist duties, too, having previously substituted for him in 2017. Pleger was in turn succeeded by Charles Ettinger in February 2024; Ettinger drew the strip until September 2026, after which Pleger temporarily returned, until Howie Noel became the strip's new permanent artist. Under Noel the appearance of the strip has reverted somewhat to the old Gould style. Chicago-area police sergeant Jim Doherty provided "Crimestopper" captions for the Sunday strips and acted as the feature's technical advisor. Doherty also introduced a new feature, "Tracy's Hall of Fame" (which replaces the "Crimestopper" panel approximately once each month), in which a real-life police officer is profiled and honored. Doherty was replaced in 2016 by police lieutenant Walter Reimer, who introduced the "First Responders Roll of Honor", which honors real-life police officers, firefighters, and paramedics who died on duty.

Staton and Curtis reintroduced many of the characters of the ‘40s through the ‘60s, including a second Mr. Crime and a reformed Mole, while introducing more deformed and grotesque villains such as Abner Kadaver, Panda, and the Jumbler. They also brought back all the gadgets and plot elements of the 1960s space era, starting in early 2013, although the reintroduced Moon Maid is not the same as the original; rather, she is a human genetically modified to resemble the original Moon Maid and, thus, is christened Mysta Chimera and placed under Diet Smith's care. They have also done crossovers, with cameos from Popeye, Brenda Starr, Reporter, Funky Winkerbean, Fearless Fosdick, The Spirit, The Green Hornet, For Better or For Worse, Friday Foster, and several long sequences involving Little Orphan Annie.

== Awards and honors ==
Chester Gould won the Reuben Award for the strip in 1959 and 1977.

The Mystery Writers of America honored Gould and his work with a Special Edgar Award in 1980. This was the first time MWA ever honored a comic strip.

In 1995, the strip was one of 20 included in the Comic Strip Classics series of commemorative postage stamps and postcards.

On May 2, 2011, the Tennessee Senate passed Resolution 30, congratulating Mike Curtis and Joe Staton on their professional accomplishments, including Dick Tracy.

On September 7, 2013, at the Baltimore Comics Convention, Dick Tracy was awarded the Harvey in the "Best Syndicated Strip or Panel" category. Tracy was simultaneously the oldest continually running strip and the first adventure strip ever to win the Harvey Award in this category. On September 6, 2014, Tracy was awarded a second Harvey Award in the newspaper strip category, becoming one of only three strips to win in this category in consecutive years. On September 26, 2015, Tracy won a third Harvey in the same category, becoming one of only three strips to win in three consecutive years.

On November 6, 2016, at their panel at Akron Comicon, Mike Curtis and Joe Staton were each presented with an Akron Comicon Excellence Award. The inscription on the plaques reads: 2016 Akron Comicon Excellence Award Presented to Mike Curtis and Joe Staton for Their Contribution to One of the Longest Running Newspaper Strips in the History of Newspaper Comics!

== In other media ==
=== Radio ===
Dick Tracy had a long run on radio, from 1934 weekdays on NBC's New England stations to the ABC network in 1948. Bob Burlen was the first radio Tracy in 1934, and others heard in the role during the 1930s and 1940s were Barry Thomson, Ned Wever and Matt Crowley. The early shows all had 15-minute episodes.

On CBS, with Sterling Products as sponsor, the serial aired four times a week from February 4, 1935, to July 11, 1935, moving to Mutual from September 30, 1935, to March 24, 1937, with Bill McClintock doing the sound effects. NBC's weekday afternoon run from January 3, 1938, to April 28, 1939, had sound effects by Keene Crockett and was sponsored by Quaker Oats, which brought Dick Tracy into primetime (Saturdays at 7 pm and, briefly, Mondays at 8 pm) with 30-minute episodes from April 29, 1939, to September 30, 1939. The series returned to 15-minute episodes on the ABC Blue Network from March 15, 1943, to July 16, 1948, sponsored by Tootsie Roll, which used the music theme of "Toot Toot, Tootsie" for its 30-minute Saturday ABC series from October 6, 1945, to June 1, 1946. Sound effects on ABC were supplied by Walt McDonough and Al Finelli.

On February 15, 1945, Command Performance broadcast the musical comedy Dick Tracy in B-Flat with Bing Crosby as Tracy, Bob Hope as Flattop, Dinah Shore as Tess Trueheart, among the cast. Dick Tracy's wedding is repeatedly interrupted as Tracy chases after one villain after another. In the strip, his marriage wasn't until 1950 and his honeymoon was disrupted by his going after Wormy.

=== Recordings ===
Jim Ameche portrayed Tracy in a two-record set recorded by Mercury Records in 1947. The record sleeves were illustrated with Sunday strips reprinted in black-and-white for children to color.

=== Comic books ===
Chester Gould's cover for 1947 Quaker Puffed Wheat giveaway comic book reprinting early 1940s Dick Tracy strips.

Tracy made his first comic book appearance in 1936 as one of the features included in the first issue of Dell's Popular Comics. These were reprints from the newspaper strip, reconfigured to fit the pages of a comic book, as was the case with most Tracy comic book appearances. Tracy remained a regular feature in Popular Comics through the publication's 21st issue.

The first comic book to feature Tracy exclusively was the Dick Tracy Feature Book, published in May 1937 by David McKay Publications. McKay's Feature Books were magazines that rotated several popular characters from comics strips through 1938. Three more of McKay's Feature Books starred Tracy in the following months.

In 1939, Dell started a comic magazine series called "Black and White Comics," essentially identical to McKay's "Feature Books." Six of the 15 issues featured Tracy. In 1941, Dell's "Black and White" series was replaced by the "Large Feature Books," the third issue of which featured Tracy. As with the McKay series, the Dell "Black and White" and "Large Feature" series were abridged reprints of the strip.

In 1938, Tracy became one of several regular newspaper strips featured in Dell's regular monthly Super Comics, remaining a regular part of that publication until 1948. In 1939, Tracy was the sole feature in the very first issue of Dell's Four-Color Comics, which put out more than 1,300 issues starring hundreds of characters between 1939 and 1962. Tracy was featured in seven more Four-Color issues throughout the 1940s.

Tracy was frequently featured in comic books used as promotional items by various companies. In 1947, for example, Sig Feuchtwanger produced a comic book that was a giveaway prize in boxes of Quaker Puffed Wheat cereal, sponsor of the popular Dick Tracy radio series.

In January 1948, Dell began the first regular Dick Tracy comic book series, Dick Tracy Monthly. This series ultimately ran for 145 issues, the first 24 of which were published by Dell, after which it was picked up by Harvey Comics. Continuing the same numbering, Harvey published the series until 1961. As with most previous Tracy comic book incarnations, these were, with the exception of the last few Dell issues which featured original material, slightly abridged and reconfigured reprints of the newspaper strips.

Dick Tracy was revived in 1986 by Blackthorne Publishing which began as a monthly series (also called Dick Tracy Monthly) but became a weekly one (Dick Tracy Weekly) with issue 25 and lasted 99 issues. Disney produced a series of three issues as a tie-in for their 1990 film. This miniseries, True Hearts and Tommy Guns, was drawn by Kyle Baker and edited by Len Wein. The third issue was a direct adaptation of the film.

In 2018, IDW Publishing announced a new Dick Tracy comic book by Mike Allred (co-writer/cover artist/inker), Lee Allred (co-writer), Rich Tommaso (penciller) and Laura Allred (colorist).

=== Books ===
Over the years, many reprints of Dick Tracy newspaper strips have been published. Beginning in 2006, IDW Publishing started the series The Complete Chester Gould's Dick Tracy, reprinting the complete strip in hardcover volumes, eventually being done under their The Library of American Comics imprint. The series concluded with the 29th and final volume being released in December 2020.

Other collections include:

- The Exploits of Dick Tracy, Detective: The Case of the Brow. Rosdon, hardcover, 1946.
- The Celebrated Cases of Dick Tracy: 1931–1951. Chelsea House, hardcover, 1970. - Does not include the Sunday strips
- Dick Tracy: His Greatest Cases No. 1 — Pruneface. Gold Medal, paperback, 1975.
- Dick Tracy: His Greatest Cases No. 2 — Snowflake and Shaky plus The Black Pearl. Gold Medal, paperback, 1975.
- Dick Tracy: His Greatest Cases No. 3 — Mrs. Pruneface plus Crime, Inc.. Gold Medal, paperback, 1975.
- Dick Tracy: The Thirties - Tommy Guns and Hard Times. Chelsea House, hardcover, 1978.
- U.S. Classics Series - Dick Tracy: Tracy's Wartime Memories. Ken Pierce Books, paperback, 1986.
- The Complete Max Collins/Rick Fletcher Dick Tracy. Dragon Lady Press, paperback.
  - #1: 50th Anniversary Dick Tracy. June 1986.
  - #2: Who Shot Pat Patton?. February 1987.
  - #3: The Ghost of Itchy. August 1987.
- Dick Tracy: Meets Angeltop. Berkeley, paperback, 1990.
- Dick Tracy #2: Meets the Punks. Berkeley, paperback, 1990.
- The Dick Tracy Casebook: Favorite Adventures 1931-1990. St. Martin's Press, paperback, 1990.
- Dick Tracy's Fiendish Foes! A 60th Anniversary Celebration. St. Martin's Press, paperback, 1991.
- Dick Tracy: Colorful Cases of the 1930s, Sunday Press Books, hardcover, 2016. ISBN 978-0-98355-043-3
- Dick Tracy: The Collins Casefiles, v1,2,3, Checker Books, 2003–2004.

Other editions:

- The first Big Little Book was a Dick Tracy title and many subsequent ones in the series followed. Some were reprintings of newspaper strips and some alternate between text and original black-and white drawings.
- Dick Tracy and the Spider Gang, a novelization of the Republic serial, Big Little Book #1446, the pages alternate between text and black-and-white photos from the movies.
- Dick Tracy, Ace Detective. Whitman, hardcover, 1943.
- Dick Tracy Meets the Night Crawler. Whitman, hardcover, 1945.
- Dick Tracy and the Woo Woo Sisters, Dell, unnumbered paperback with a pictorial back cover but not a mapback, 1947.

=== Film ===
==== Film serials ====
Dick Tracy made his film debut in Dick Tracy (1937), a 15-chapter movie serial by Republic Pictures starring Ralph Byrd. The Spider Gang was on the loose, tired of Dick Tracy's cunning skills. Through the 15-chapter serial, 15 different cases were solved, all plots by the Spider Gang. Dick Tracy was also in search of his missing brother, Gordon Tracy (Carleton Young). The Dick Tracy character proved very popular, and a second serial, Dick Tracy Returns, appeared in 1938 (reissued in 1948). Dick Tracy's G-Men was released in 1939 (reissued in 1955). The last was Dick Tracy vs. Crime Inc. in 1941 (reissued as Dick Tracy vs. Phantom Empire in 1952).

The sequels were produced under an interpretation of the contract for the first Dick Tracy serial, which gave license for "a series or serial". As a result, Chester Gould received no further money for the sequel serials.

Dick Tracy is portrayed as an FBI agent, or "G-Man", based in California rather than as a detective in the police force of a Midwestern city resembling Chicago, and, aside from himself and Junior, no characters from the strip appear in any of the four serials.

However, comic relief sidekick "Mike McGurk" bears some resemblance to Tracy's partner from the strip, Pat Patton; Tracy's secretary, Gwen Andrews (played by several actresses in the course of the series, including Jennifer Jones under a variation of her real name, Phyllis Isley), provides the same kind of feminine interest as Tess Trueheart; and FBI Director Clive Anderson (Francis X. Bushman and others) is the same kind of avuncular superior as Chief Brandon.

The first serial, Dick Tracy, is now in the public domain.

==== Early feature films ====
Four years after the release of the final Republic serial, Dick Tracy would headline the first of four feature films, produced by RKO Radio Pictures. Dick Tracy (1945), retitled Dick Tracy, Detective for TV syndication and video, was followed by Dick Tracy vs. Cueball in 1946, both with Morgan Conway as Tracy. Conway's low-key interpretation of the character, calm and businesslike, was entirely in keeping with a police procedural. Conway was well received by the press; the trade publication Showmen's Trade Review reported, "It is Conway's splendid interpretation of Dick Tracy that makes this film such good entertainment and a very auspicious first in the series." Dick Tracy writer Max Allan Collins strongly approves of his performances: "To the late Morgan Conway, wherever you are, a tip of the fedora. You did very, very well."

Ralph Byrd had played the role in four hit serials, and some exhibitors petitioned RKO to make more Tracy features, but with Byrd. RKO made the substitution and two more features followed: Dick Tracy's Dilemma and Dick Tracy Meets Gruesome (both 1947). Gruesome is probably the best known of the four, with the villain portrayed by Boris Karloff. All four movies had many of the visual features associated with film noir: dramatic, shadowy photographic compositions, with many exterior scenes filmed at night (at the RKO Encino movie ranch). Lyle Latell co-starred in all four films as Pat Patton. Anne Jeffreys played Tess Trueheart in the first two, succeeded by Kay Christopher and finally Anne Gwynne; Ian Keith joined the cast as the actor Vitamin Flintheart for two films; Joseph Crehan played Chief Brandon. RKO stocked the films with familiar faces, creating a veritable rogues' gallery of colorful characters: Mike Mazurki as Splitface, Dick Wessel as Cueball, Esther Howard as Filthy Flora, Jack Lambert as hook-handed villain the Claw; baldheaded, pop-eyed Milton Parsons, mild-mannered Byron Foulger, dangerous Trevor Bardette, and pockmarked, gently sinister Skelton Knaggs. The studio discontinued most of its "B" product in 1947 and Conway's contract was not renewed. In 1948, Chester Gould proposed that RKO should continue the series, stipulating that Morgan Conway should play the lead, but RKO (then in organizational turmoil after the studio's sale to Howard Hughes) declined.

==== 1990 feature film ====
Warren Beatty produced, directed, co-wrote (uncredited), and starred in the 1990 film Dick Tracy, whose supporting cast includes Al Pacino, Madonna, Glenne Headly, and Charlie Korsmo. Dick Tracy depicts the detective's romantic relationships with Breathless Mahoney and Tess Trueheart, as well as his conflicts with crime boss Alphonse "Big Boy" Caprice and his henchmen. Tracy also begins fostering a young street urchin named Kid. Development of the film began in the early 1980s with Tom Mankiewicz assigned to write the script. The screenplay was written instead by Jim Cash and Jack Epps Jr., both of Top Gun fame. The project also went through directors (Steven Spielberg, John Landis, Walter Hill, and Richard Benjamin) before the arrival of Beatty. It was filmed mainly at Universal Studios. Danny Elfman was hired to compose the score, and the film's music and songs were featured on three separate soundtrack albums.

==== Filmography ====
===== Republic Pictures =====
1. Dick Tracy (1937, serial, 15 episodes, starring Ralph Byrd)
  1. Dick Tracy (1937, feature version edited from the serial, starring Ralph Byrd)
2. Dick Tracy Returns (1938 serial, 15 episodes starring Ralph Byrd)
3. Dick Tracy's G-Men (1939, serial, 15 episodes, starring Ralph Byrd)
4. Dick Tracy vs. Crime, Inc. (1941, serial, 15 episodes, starring Ralph Byrd; reissued in 1952 as Dick tracy vs. Phantom Empire)

===== RKO Radio Pictures =====
1. Dick Tracy (1945, feature film starring Morgan Conway)
2. Dick Tracy vs. Cueball (1946, feature film starring Morgan Conway)
3. Dick Tracy's Dilemma (1947, feature film starring Ralph Byrd)
4. Dick Tracy Meets Gruesome (1947, feature film starring Ralph Byrd)

===== Touchstone Pictures =====
- Dick Tracy (1990, feature film starring Warren Beatty)

=== Television ===
- Dick Tracy (1950–1951) - live-action television series starring Ralph Byrd
- The Dick Tracy Show (1961) - animated television series with various voices including Everett Sloane, Mel Blanc, and Benny Rubin
- The Famous Adventures of Mr. Magoo, "Dick Tracy and the Mob" (1965 animated half-hour TV episode with the voices of Everett Sloane and Jim Backus
- Dick Tracy (1967) - television pilot starring Ray MacDonnell
- Archie's TV Funnies (1971) - features original Dick Tracy mini-episodes using the classic villains and cast from the strip, more faithful in tone than the earlier animated series
- Dick Tracy Special (2010) - half-hour special featuring Dick Tracy (Warren Beatty) being interviewed by Leonard Maltin
- Dick Tracy Special - Tracy Zooms In (2023) - 25-minute special featuring a Zoom conversation between Tracy (Beatty), Maltin, Ben Mankiewicz, and Beatty himself

The strip has had limited exposure on television with one early live-action series, two animated series, one unsold pilot that was never picked up, and a proposed TV series currently held up in litigation.

==== First live-action series ====
Ralph Byrd, who had played the square-jawed sleuth in all four Republic movie serials and two of the RKO feature-length films, reprised his role in a short-lived live action Dick Tracy series that ran on ABC from 1950 to 1951. Additional episodes intended for first-run syndication continued to be produced into 1952. Produced by P. K. Palmer, who also wrote many of the scripts, the series often featured Gould-created villains such as Flattop, Shaky, the Mole, Breathless Mahoney, Heels Beals and Influence, all of whom appeared on film for the first time on this series. Other cast members included Joe Devlin as Sam Catchem, Angela Greene as Tess Tracy (née Trueheart), Martin Dean as Junior, and Pierre Watkin as Chief Patton. Criticized for its violence, the series remained popular. The series was filmed on a low budget, with many long hours and a rushed shooting schedule, and the strenuous conditions may well have affected Byrd's health; he died prematurely in 1952, ending the series. Many episodes of this series have been released on various public domain TV detective DVD sets.

==== Animated cartoons ====
DVD release of the 1961 cartoon.

The first cartoon series was produced from 1960 to 1961 by UPA. Tracy employed a series of cartoon-like subordinate flatfoots to fight crime each week, contacting them on his two-way wrist radio. Everett Sloane voiced Tracy and supporting characters and villains were voiced by Jerry Hausner, Mel Blanc, Benny Rubin, Johnny Coons, Paul Frees and others. These subordinates included "Go-Go" Gomez, Joe Jitsu, Hemlock Holmes and the Retouchables, and Officer Heap O'Calorie. 130 five-minute cartoons were designed and packaged for syndication, usually intended for local children's shows.

UPA was also the production company behind the Mr. Magoo cartoons, so it was possible for them to arrange a meeting between Tracy and Magoo in a 1965 episode of the season-long TV series The Famous Adventures of Mr. Magoo. In the episode "Dick Tracy and the Mob", Tracy persuades Magoo (a well-known actor in the context of the Famous Adventures series) to impersonate an international hit man named Squinty Eyes, who he resembles, and infiltrate a gang of criminals made up of Flattop, Pruneface, Itchy, Mumbles and others. Unlike the earlier animated Tracy shorts, this longer episode was played relatively straight, with Tracy getting much more screen time. Pitting Tracy against a coalition of several of his foes was adopted more than two decades later in the 1990 film.

A second cartoon series was produced in 1971 and was a feature in Archie's TV Funnies, produced by Filmation. It adhered more closely to the comic strip, although it was hampered by cruder animation than the UPA shorts, typical of the studio's production standards.

==== Live action television pilot ====
William Dozier produced a pilot for a live action Dick Tracy series in 1967 starring Ray MacDonnell in the title role. (Dozier was the producer responsible for the 1966 Batman TV series.) The pilot was "The Plot to Kill NATO", featuring "Special Guest Villain" Victor Buono as 'Mr. Memory'. The series was not purchased by either ABC or NBC. Eve Plumb, who would later find fame as Jan Brady on The Brady Bunch, is credited as Bonnie Braids, who does not appear in the pilot, nor does Davey Davison as Tess.

=== Licensed products ===
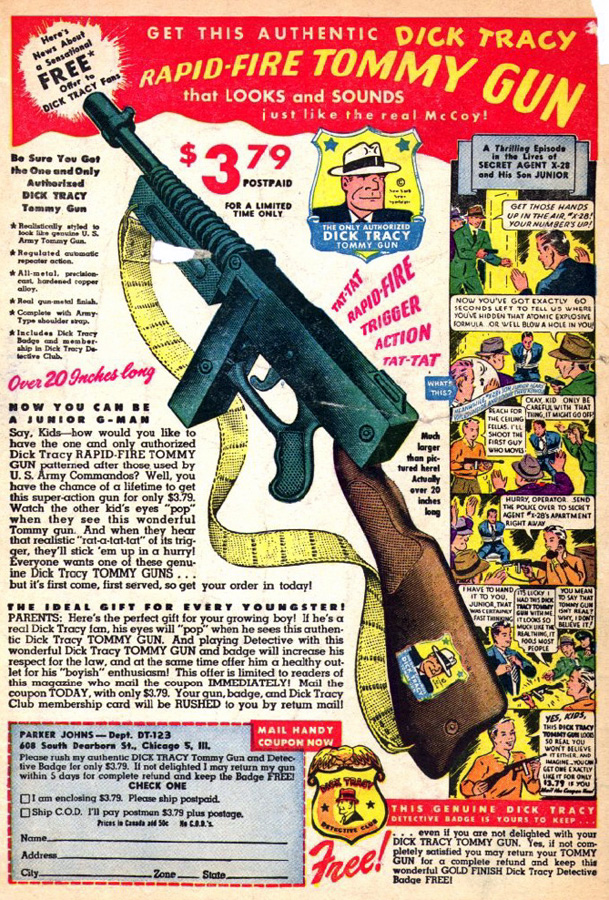
Advertisement for Dick Tracy Rapid-Fire Tommy Gun

In the 1960s, Aurora produced a plastic model kit of Dick Tracy sliding down a fire escape ladder into an alley, in hot pursuit with gun drawn. A Dick Tracy Space Coupe model came next. Both have been reissued by Polar Lights. Also in the market were Mattel's Dick Tracy range of toy guns.

In 1990, Playmates Toys released a line of action figures called Dick Tracy: Coppers and Gangsters to coincide with the Dick Tracy movie. The figures were 5" tall, stylized with exaggerated comic looks and was accompanied by many accessories. Two figures in the line had limited availability; Steve the Tramp (called "The Tramp" on the package front) was pulled from the assortment after complaints of portrayal of a homeless person as a criminal. The figure of "The Blank" was added to the assortment well after the film's release to keep the secret of the identity of the character. As a result, only limited quantities of these two figures made it to store shelves.

Various distinct video games tied in with the film were developed. Titus Software did versions many platforms including Amiga, Commodore and MS-DOS. Dick Tracy is a side scrolling action shooting game. The player controls Dick Tracy through five stages. The Commodore 64 version is infamous for being released in an unfinished state (minimal animation for the main character, missing headlines in the linking screens, flick scrolling), and scored Commodore Format magazine's lowest ever review score of 11%. There were also games made for the Nintendo Entertainment System (1990), Master System (1990), Sega Genesis (1990), and Game Boy (1991)., and a graphic adventure for MS-DOS and the Amiga.

In 2009, Shocker Toys released a monochromatic Dick Tracy action figure as an exclusive product for San Diego Comic-Con. The figure appears in a suit with two-way wrist radio. There was also a variant figure released of Dick Tracy in his signature trench coat and fedora with a tommy gun accessory.

=== Rights to adapt in other media ===
Media outlets reported a legal battle being waged over rights to the Dick Tracy character. Warren Beatty announced plans to make a sequel to his 1990 movie. At the same time, television producers announced plans for a new Dick Tracy TV series. Both sides claimed that they were the legal owners of the rights to Dick Tracy. In May 2005, Beatty sued the Tribune Company, claiming he has owned the rights to the Dick Tracy character since 1985. Pressure from Beatty led to the cancellation of a proposed collaboration between artist Mike Oeming and writer Brian Bendis on a new serialized Dick Tracy comic.

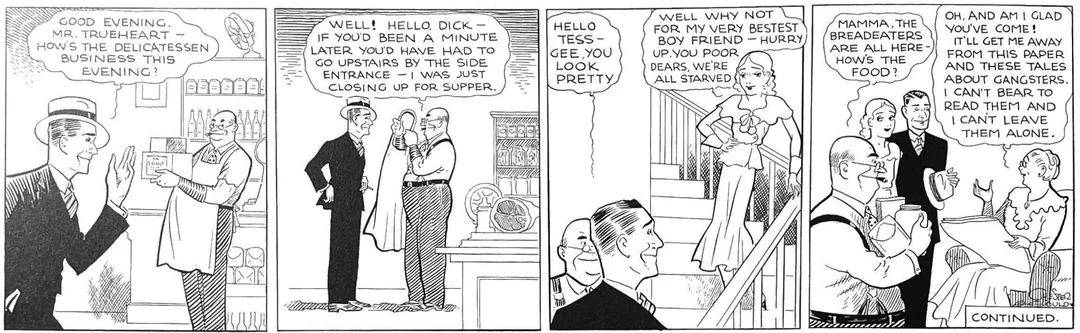
The first Dick Tracy strip from October 4, 1931

The lawsuit was resolved in Beatty's favor, with a U.S. District judge ruling that Beatty did everything contractually required of him to keep the rights to the character. Beatty has maintained the rights to Tracy since then by producing two made-for-TV specials. While the first special is believed to have been part of the rights battle, the second special does not seem to have had a direct legal impetus, as it was claimed that Dick Tracy will enter the public domain in 2027. However, it seems that the earliest comic versions of Dick Tracy are already in the public domain as the Tribune did not renew the copyright to the original 1931 strip at the required time.

== In popular culture ==
- Fearless Fosdick is a long-running parody of Dick Tracy that appeared intermittently as a strip-within-a-strip in Al Capp's satirical hillbilly comic strip, Li'l Abner (1934–1977).
- Gilbert Shelton parodied Dick Tracy as "Tricky Prickears" in his Fabulous Furry Freak Brothers comic strips.
- The artist Jess Collins used an X-Acto knife and rubber cement to reassemble Gould's strip into Tricky Cad (an anagram of "Dick Tracy"). Gould threatened to sue if the Tricky Cad collages were published.
- Daffy Duck parodied Dick Tracy as "Duck Twacy" in the 1946 Looney Tunes cartoon The Great Piggy Bank Robbery.
- In a "Fractured Fairy Tales" skit from The Adventures of Rocky and Bullwinkle and Friends in the early 1960s, the Ugly Duckling travels to Hollywood, where he observes passing celebrities including Duck Tracy.
- In the 1985 James Bond movie A View to a Kill, an otherwise unnamed San Francisco Police Department officer played by Joe Flood sarcastically refers to himself as Dick Tracy.
- The UPA version of Dick Tracy (though already having appeared in the novel) was scheduled to appear as a cameo in the deleted scene "Acme's Funeral" from the film Who Framed Roger Rabbit. However, in the final cut, Roger Rabbit impersonates him when he handcuffs himself to detective, Eddie Valiant.
- Dick Tracy was parodied in 1990 in the Season 8 episode of Alvin and the Chipmunks, as "Chip Tracy".
- Dick Tracy was parodied by the adult animated stop motion sketch comedy TV show Robot Chicken in the season 3 episode "Rabbits on a Roller Coaster".
- A statue of Dick Tracy can be found in Naperville, Illinois, on the city's riverwalk. It was erected in honor of longtime Naperville resident Dick Locher, who worked as an assistant to Chester Gould and later drew the comic strip and created the storyline for it.

== See also ==
- Chief Yellow Horse, the real-life basis for the Dick Tracy character Yellow Pony
- List of Dick Tracy villains
- List of film serials
- List of Dick Tracy characters
- Go Comics
- Mary Worth
- National Allied Publications
