= Lyle Latell =

American character actor (1904–1967)

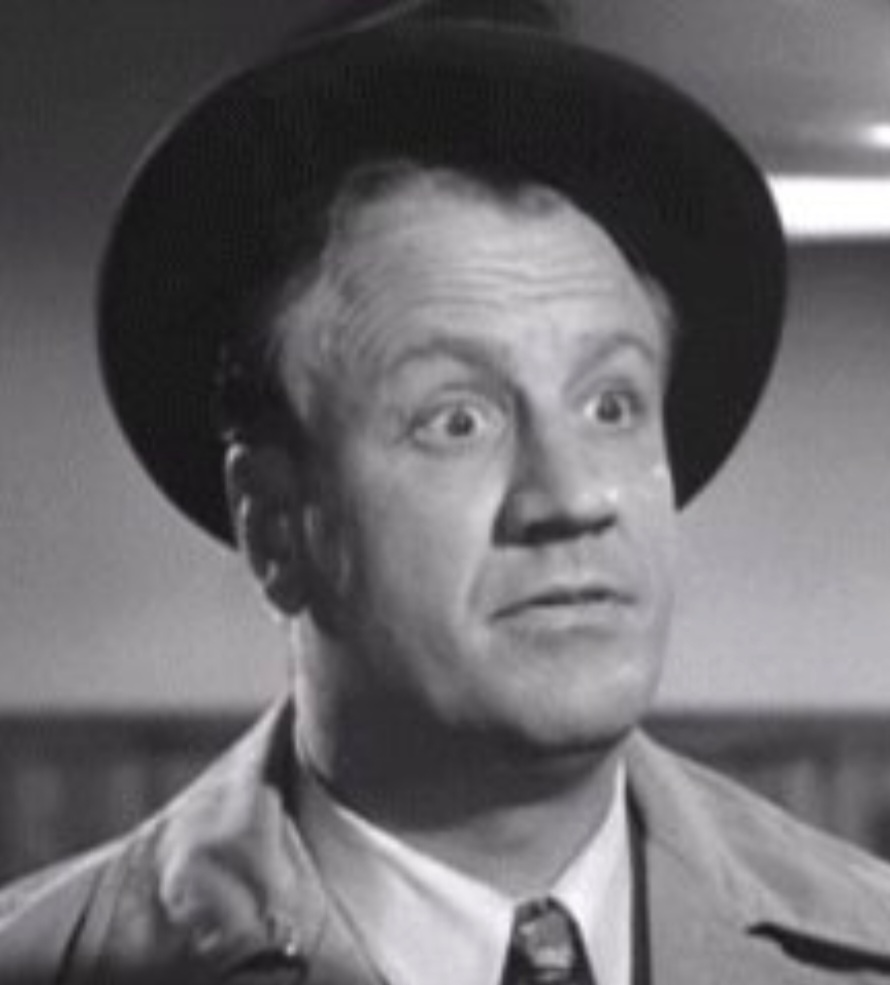
- Latell in Dick Tracy vs. Cueball (1946)
- Born: Lyle Zeien; April 9, 1904; Elma, Iowa, U.S.
- Died: October 24, 1967 (aged 63); Hollywood, California, U.S.
- Resting place: San Fernando Mission Cemetery
- Occupation: Actor
- Years active: 1941–1966
- Spouse: Mary Foy (m. 1947)

Lyle Latell (born Lyle Zeien; April 9, 1904 – October 24, 1967) was an American character actor. He was best known for playing Pat Patton in the Dick Tracy film series.

Latell died on October 24, 1967 of a heart attack in Hollywood, California, at the age of 63. He is interred in San Fernando Mission Cemetery.

== Filmography ==
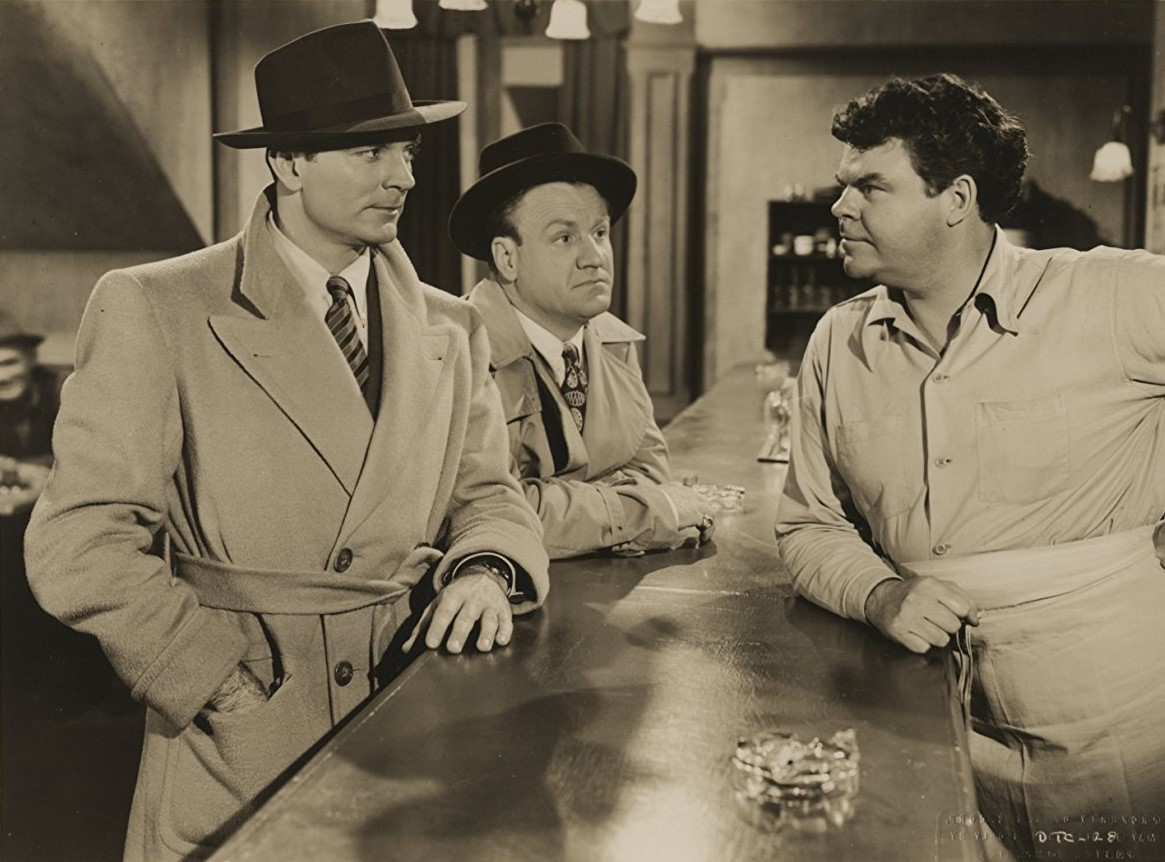
Latell (center) with Ralph Byrd and Wade Crosby in Dick Tracy's Dilemma (1947)

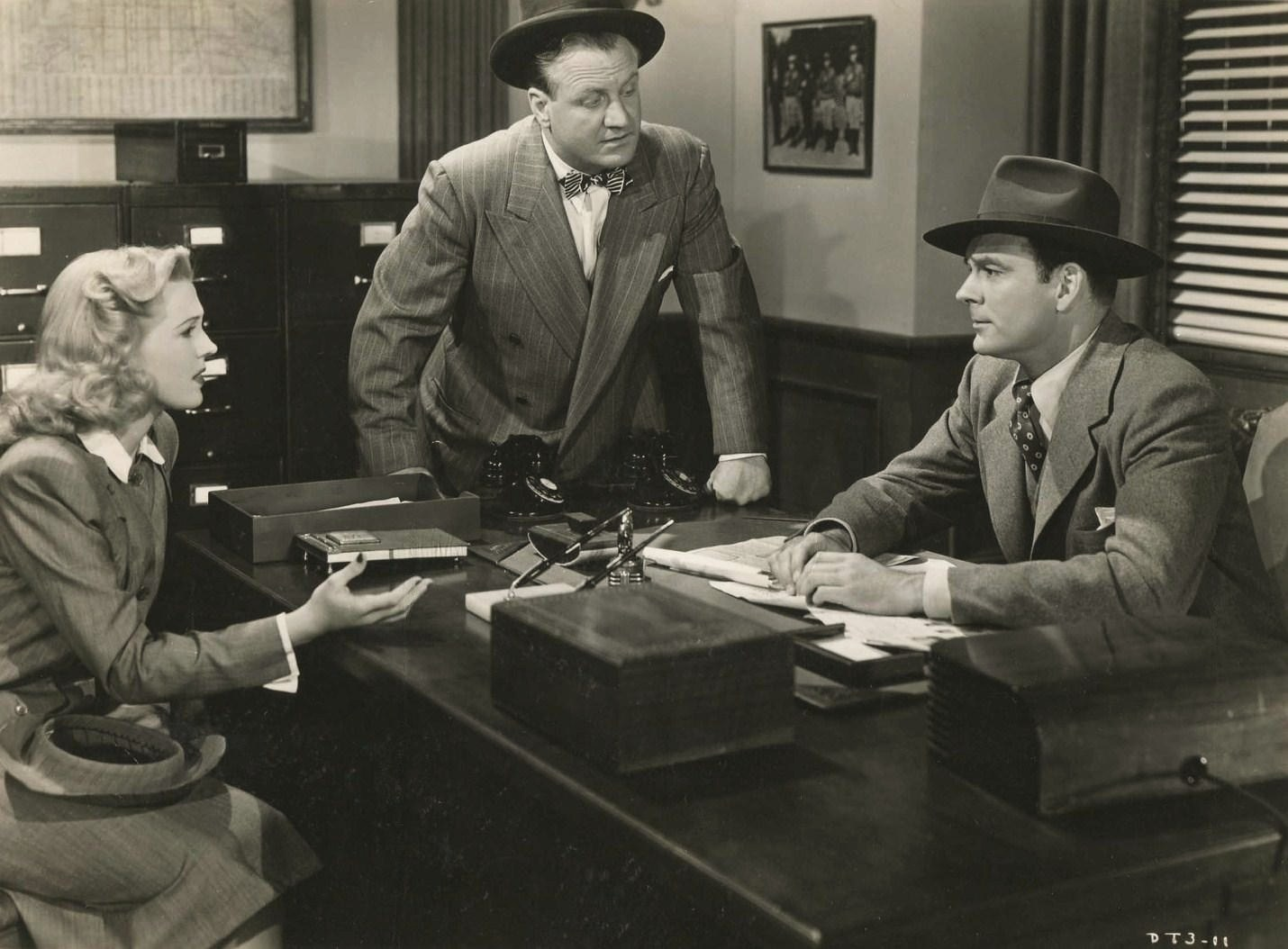
Latell (center) with Anne Gwynne and Ralph Byrd in Dick Tracy Meets Gruesome (1947)

=== Film ===
Year	Title	Role	Notes
1941	Federal Fugitives	Chuck	Film debut
1941	Sky Raiders	Evans	12-episode serial
1941	In the Navy	Marine Sentry	(uncredited)
1941	Texas	Dutch Henry	(uncredited)
1941	Great Guns	New Recruit	(uncredited)
1941	Shadow of the Thin Man	Waiter Serving Benny	(uncredited)
1942	The Fleet's In	Drunk Harassing the Countess	(uncredited)
1942	The Night Before the Divorce	Detective Brady	
1942	True to the Army	Soldier	(uncredited)
1942	My Favorite Blonde	Bus Driver	(uncredited)
1942	The Wife Takes a Flyer	Muller	
1942	They All Kissed the Bride	Truck Driver	(uncredited)
1942	Foreign Agent	Eddie McGurk	
1942	The Navy Comes Through	Oiler	(uncredited)
1942	Lucky Jordan	Army Guard	(scenes deleted)
1943	Happy Go Lucky	Man in Kissing Routine	(uncredited)
1943	They Got Me Covered	Walsh	(uncredited)
1943	Yanks Ahoy	Helmsman	(uncredited)
1944	Men on Her Mind	Big Joe Munroe	
1944	The Navy Way	Agnes' Cousin	(uncredited)
1944	See Here, Private Hargrove	Marine	(uncredited)
1944	That's My Baby!	Office Worker Comedy Routine	
1944	One Mysterious Night	Detective Sergeant Matthews	(uncredited)
1944	One Body Too Many	Manager of Atlas Detective Agency	(uncredited)
1945	High Powered	Worker at Dance	(uncredited)
1945	A Guy, a Gal and a Pal	Marine Major	(uncredited)
1945	The Chicago Kid	Henchman	(uncredited)
1945	Incendiary Blonde	New Yorker	(uncredited)
1945	George White's Scandals	Bartender Gag	(uncredited)
1945	Hold That Blonde	Tony	
1945	Dick Tracy	Pat Patton	
1946	The Well Groomed Bride	Bit Part	(uncredited)
1946	Shadows Over Chinatown	Police Clerk	
1946	The Mysterious Mr. Valentine	Peter Musso	
1946	The Well Groomed Bride	Bit Part	(uncredited)
1946	Dick Tracy vs. Cueball	Pat Patton	
1946	That Brennan Girl	Party Guest	(uncredited)
1947	The Perfect Marriage	Bulaski	(uncredited)
1947	Buck Privates Come Home	Sergeant - Medic #1	(uncredited)
1947	Dick Tracy's Dilemma	Pat Patton	
1947	The Trouble with Women	Sailor	(uncredited)
1947	The Gas House Kids in Hollywood	Carter's Henchman	
1947	Song of the Thin Man	Mug #2	
1947	Dick Tracy Meets Gruesome	Pat Patton	
1947	Ride the Pink Horse	Policeman	(uncredited)
1947	Road to the Big House	Minor Role	(uncredited)
1947	Buck Privates Come Home	Sergeant - Medic #1	(uncredited)
1947	T-Men	Gregg's Driver	(uncredited)
1948	The Man from Texas	Horseman	(uncredited)
1948	The Noose Hangs High	Shatterproof Glass Seller	(uncredited)
1948	The Cobra Strikes	Police Sgt. Harris	
1948	The Street with No Name	Officer	(uncredited)
1948	Hollow Triumph	Ship's Official at Dock	(uncredited)
1948	Night Has a Thousand Eyes	Policeman	(uncredited)
1948	Bungalow 13	Willie	
1948	He Walked by Night	Police Sergeant	(uncredited)
1949	Sky Dragon	Ed Davidson	
1949	Red Stallion in the Rockies	Dice Player	(uncredited)
1949	Take One False Step	Reporter	(uncredited)
1949	Trapped	Agent Curry	
1950	The Damned Don't Cry	Tropper	(uncredited)
1950	Bright Leaf	Clay	(uncredited)
1950	The Great Jewel Robber	Guard	(uncredited)
1950	Highway 301	Police Officer Murray	
1950	The Damned Don't Cry	Tropper	(uncredited)
1951	I Was a Communist for the F.B.I.	FBI Officer Cahill	
1951	Inside the Walls of Folsom Prison	Sgt. Noonan	
1951	A Streetcar Named Desire	Policeman	
1953	Off Limits	Bartender	(uncredited)
1953	House of Wax	Waiter	
1953	Scared Stiff	Ship Captain	
1953	Houdini	Calcott	(uncredited)
1953	The Big Heat	Moving Man	(uncredited)
1954	Crime Wave	Hoodlum at Counter	(uncredited)
1955	The Seven Little Foys	Baggage Car Attendant	(uncredited)
1955	The Girl Rush	Bus Driver	(uncredited)
1955	Lucy Gallant	Oil Rigger	(uncredited)
1955	Bobby Ware Is Missing	Deputy	(uncredited)
1955	At Gunpoint	Man in Saloon	(uncredited)
1956	The Steel Jungle	Bailiff	
1956	Indestructible Man	Police Sergeant	(uncredited)
1956	Mohawk	Settler	(uncredited)
1956	Outside the Law	Counterman	(uncredited)
1956	You Can't Run Away from It	Dispatcher	(uncredited)
1956	Bundle of Joy	Head Bouncer	(uncredited)
1957	Kelly and Me	Joe Webb	
1957	Not of This Earth		(scenes deleted)
1957	Affair in Reno	Squad Car Policeman	(uncredited)
1957	Public Pigeon No. 1	Police Sergeant Ryan	
1957	Beginning of the End	Police Lt. MacKenzie	
1957	The Night the World Exploded	Civil Defense Chief Carson	
1958	The True Story of Lynn Stuart	Counterman	(uncredited)
1958	Cole Younger, Gunfighter	Second Bartender	(uncredited)
1958	Live Fast, Die Young	Josh	
1958	The Fearmakers	Police Sergeant Dispatcher	(uncredited)
1959	Alias Jesse James	Conductor #1	(uncredited)
1960	One Foot in Hell	Cantina Barfly	(uncredited)
1962	House of Women	Sam - Prison Guard	(uncredited)
1963	Wall of Noise	Ticket Seller	(uncredited)
1966	Chamber of Horrors	Trainman	Final film role

=== Television ===
Year	Title	Role	Notes
1953–1954	My Little Margie	The House Detective/Officer O'Brien/Detective/Bradford	5 episodes
1955	The Millionaire	Mover	1 episode
1955	Damon Runyon Theater	Sheriff	1 episode
1955	Screen Directors Playhouse	Ernie's Friend	1 episode
1956	Navy Log	Air Officer	1 episode
1956	The 20th Century-Fox Hour	Prison Guard	1 episode
1957	Death Valley Days	Sergeant	1 episode
1957	The Life of Riley	Grocer	1 episode
1957	Perry Mason	Police Officer Bill Duggan	1 episode
1958	The Adventures of Jim Bowie	1st Policeman / Constable	2 episodes
1958	The Californians	Bosun's Mate	1 episode
1959	Fury	Jack	1 episode
1959	M Squad	Nick Anson	1 episode
1960	The Chevy Mystery Show	Hannegan	1 episode
1961	Dennis the Menace	Fire Chief	1 episode
1962	Surfside 6	Coach Rice	1 episode
1962	Lawman	Sheriff Parker	1 episode
1962	The New Breed	Bus Clerk	1 episode
1963	Route 66	Deputy	1 episode
1964	No Time for Sergeants	Sheriff	1 episode
1965	The Andy Griffith Show	Farley Thurston	1 episode
