= Michael Kilian =

American journalist

Michael David Kilian (16 July 1939 – 26 October 2005) was a journalist and author. He was born in Toledo, Ohio and raised in Chicago and Westchester, New York. Kilian died on 26 October 2005 from illness and was interred at Arlington National Cemetery. In addition to being a long-time correspondent for the Chicago Tribune in Washington, D.C., Kilian was an accomplished author of numerous books, including the Harrison Raines Civil War mysteries. His father was instrumental in his education of the Civil War era and in visiting the many battlefield sites. His family includes early settlers of Virginia and New York, and Union soldiers who died at Fredericksburg and fought at Gettysburg on Little Round Top. In 1993, Killian began writing the Dick Tracy comic strip with illustrator Dick Locher. One of their storylines involved Tess Trueheart serving Tracy with divorce papers. Kilian had a wife, to whom he had been married for 35 years, and two sons. Kilian also served in the Coast Guard Auxiliary.

== Novels ==
- Harrison Raines series
  - Murder at Manassas - 2000 ISBN 0-425-17233-3
  - A Killing at Ball's Bluff - 2001 ISBN 0-425-17804-8
  - The Ironclad Alibi - 2002 ISBN 0-425-18325-4
  - A Grave at Glorieta - 2003 ISBN 0-425-18829-9
  - The Shiloh Sisters - 2003 ISBN 0-425-19403-5
  - Antietam Assassins - 2005 ISBN 0-7278-6272-3
- Bedford Green series
  - Weeping Woman - 2001 ISBN 0-425-18001-8
  - Uninvited Countess - 2002 ISBN 0-425-18582-6
  - Sinful Safari - 2003 ISBN 0-425-19108-7
- Other fiction
  - Valkyrie Project - 1981 ISBN 0-312-83607-4
  - Northern Exposure - 1983 ISBN 0-312-57896-2
  - Blood of the Czars - 1984 ISBN 0-312-08450-1
  - By order of the President - 1986 ISBN 0-312-11116-9
  - Dance on a Sinking Ship - 1988 ISBN 0-312-01413-9
  - Looker - 1991 ISBN 0-312-05123-9
  - Last Virginia gentleman - 1992 ISBN 0-312-07859-5
  - Big score - 1993 ISBN 0-312-09925-8
  - Major Washington - 1998 ISBN 0-312-18131-0
  - Deepkill - 2005 ISBN 0-425-20351-4

== Non-fiction ==
- Who runs Chicago? - 1979 ISBN 0-312-87023-X
- Who runs Washington? - 1982 ISBN 0-312-87024-8
- Heavy losses: The dangerous decline of American defense (with James Coates) - 1985 ISBN 0-670-80484-3
- Flying can be Fun - 1985 ISBN 0-88289-449-8 (Pbk)
