= Dick Tracy (TV series) =

American TV police drama series (1950–1951)

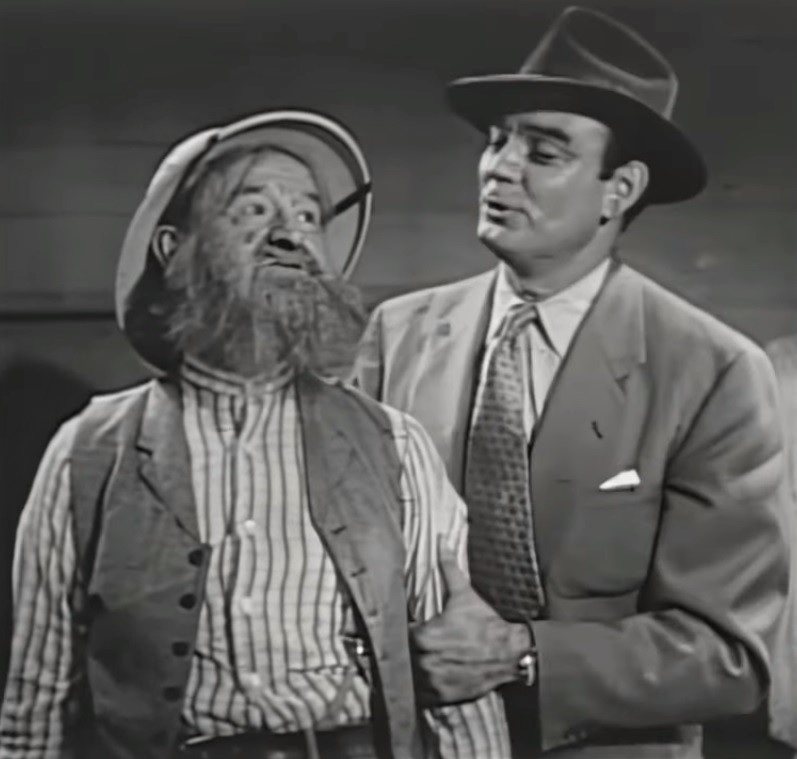
- Ralph Byrd (right) as Dick Tracy
- Genre: Crime
- Starring: Ralph Byrd
- Country of origin: United States
- Original language: English
- No. of seasons: 2
- No. of episodes: 48

Production
- Producer: PK Palmer
- Running time: 30 mins

Original release
- Network: ABC
- Release: September 11, 1950 – April 7, 1951

Dick Tracy is an American TV police drama series based on the detective comic strip Dick Tracy. The show aired on ABC from September 11, 1950 to April 7, 1951. It starred Ralph Byrd. Byrd's death in 1952 ended the series at 26 episodes.

The series initially was broadcast on Wednesdays from 8:30 to 9 p.m. Eastern Time. In October 1950 it was moved to Mondays from 8:30 to 9 p.m. E. T., and in January 1951 it was moved to Tuesdays from 8 to 8:30 p.m. E. T.

== Adaptation ==
An animated series, The Dick Tracy Show, aired in syndication in 1961.

In 1966, a Dick Tracy television pilot was produced for a new series but was not picked up.

== Cast ==
The cast included:

- Ralph Byrd as Dick Tracy
- Joe Devlin as Sam Catchem
- Angela Greene as Tess Trueheart
- Dick Elliott as Officer Murphy
- Pierre Watkin as Police Chief Pat Patton
- Thurston Hall as Diet Smith
- Florence Bates as Miss Frothingham
- Lyle Talbot as the Brain
- Jo-Carroll Dennison as Breathless Mahoney

== Production ==
It was shot at the Sam Goldwyn Studios in Los Angeles.
