= The Complete Chester Gould's Dick Tracy =

Book series by Chester Gould

Publication information
- Publisher: previous: IDW Publishing current: The Library of American Comics
- Schedule: biannual
- Format: Hardcover
- Genre: Crime; Detective fiction Action
- Publication date: 2006
- Main character: Dick Tracy

Creative team
- Written by: Chester Gould
- Artist: Chester Gould
- Editor(s): Vol. 1 - 6: Ted Adams Vol. 7 - onwards: Dean Mullaney

The Complete Chester Gould's Dick Tracy (also known as The Complete Dick Tracy) is a series of 29 hardcover books published by The Library of American Comics, an imprint of IDW Publishing, that bring together every Dick Tracy comic strip in chronological order, both black-and-white dailies and Sunday strips, written and drawn by Chester Gould from its premiere on October 4, 1931, until December 25, 1977.

== Format ==
=== Volumes 1–6 ===
Originally, these volumes measured 9.5 inches x 7 inches (242 mm × 178 mm) with approximately 350 pages per volume. The books were edited and designed by Ted Adams, with cover design by Ashley Wood and introductions by Max Allan Collins. The books feature an interview with the creator, Chester Gould, conducted by Max Allan Collins.

More recently, these volumes are being re-released by Clover Press and The Library of American Comics in a larger format consistent with volumes 7-29.

=== Volumes 7–29 ===
These later volumes measure 11 x 8.5 inches, (280 mm × 216 mm) with about 250-300 pages per volume. They are edited and designed by Dean Mullaney, with introductions by Max Allan Collins and essays by Jeff Kersten.

After the publication of the first six volumes of the series, it was handed over by its editor and the CEO of IDW Publishing, Ted Adams, to the IDW imprint The Library of American Comics (LoAC). Dean Mullaney became the new editor of the Dick Tracy reprint series. As this transition happened, it was decided that the size of the volumes would be increased to match the other LoAC book lines. Even though this meant that the Sunday strips were printed 40 percent larger in this new iteration of the series, the daily strips were actually printed smaller compared to the size they had in the first six volumes, since there were now three strips to a page instead of two. A new cover design was also introduced, the introductory essays grew to become broader and more extensive, delivering a more complete history of the strip and its creator Gould. Contact was established with the Gould family, the Dick Tracy Museum and the Shel Dorf collection to obtain more archival material, such as art and photographs. Jeff Kersten began to contribute afterword essays which place the Dick Tracy strip in historical context and elaborates on its cultural impact.

== Volumes ==
Volumes
Volume	Release date	Title	Period	Page count	ISBN
1	2006-?	The Complete Chester Gould's Dick Tracy: Dailies & Sundays - Vol. 1	1931–1933	364	978-1-60010-036-9
2	2007-05-08	The Complete Chester Gould's Dick Tracy: Dailies & Sundays - Vol. 2	1933–1935	380	978-1-60010-037-6
3	2007-12-01	The Complete Chester Gould's Dick Tracy: Dailies & Sundays - Vol. 3	1935–1936	352	978-1-60010-038-3
4	2008-05-06	The Complete Chester Gould's Dick Tracy: Dailies & Sundays - Vol. 4	1936–1938	344	978-1-60010-039-0
5	2008-08-15	The Complete Chester Gould's Dick Tracy: Dailies & Sundays - Vol. 5	1938–1939	352	978-1-60010-201-1
6	2009-01-29	The Complete Chester Gould's Dick Tracy: Dailies & Sundays - Vol. 6	1939–1941	346	978-1-60010-283-7
7	2009-05-26	The Complete Dick Tracy: Dailies & Sundays - Vol. 7	1941–1942	288	978-1-60010-395-7
8	2009-08-17	The Complete Dick Tracy: Dailies & Sundays - Vol. 8	1942–1944	264	978-1-60010-463-3
9	2010-01-26	The Complete Dick Tracy: Dailies & Sundays - Vol. 9	1944–1945	266	978-1-60010-532-6
10	2010-06-22	The Complete Dick Tracy: Dailies & Sundays - Vol. 10	1945–1947	266	978-1-60010-578-4
11	2011-02-15	The Complete Dick Tracy: Dailies & Sundays - Vol. 11	1947–1948	266	978-1-60010-579-1
12	2011-10-25	The Complete Dick Tracy: Dailies & Sundays - Vol. 12	1948–1950	276	978-1-61377-057-3
13	2012-05-29	The Complete Dick Tracy: Dailies & Sundays - Vol. 13	1950–1951	252	978-1-61377-198-3
14	2013-01-15	The Complete Dick Tracy: Dailies & Sundays - Vol. 14	1951–1953	256	978-1-61377-507-3
15	2013-07-09	The Complete Dick Tracy: Dailies & Sundays - Vol. 15	1953–1954	256	978-1-61377-668-1
16	2014-04-08	The Complete Dick Tracy: Dailies & Sundays - Vol. 16	1954–1956	276	978-1-61377-864-7
17	2014-10-14	The Complete Dick Tracy: Dailies & Sundays - Vol. 17	1956–1957	276	978-1-63140-077-3
18	2015-05-12	The Complete Dick Tracy: Dailies & Sundays - Vol. 18	1957–1959	276	978-1-63140-241-8
19	2015-11-24	The Complete Dick Tracy: Dailies & Sundays - Vol. 19	1959–1961	276	978-1-63140-401-6
20	2016-05-31	The Complete Dick Tracy: Dailies & Sundays - Vol. 20	1961–1962	272	978-1-63140-605-8
21	2017-01-31	The Complete Dick Tracy: Dailies & Sundays - Vol. 21	1962–1964	272	978-1-63140-794-9
22	2017-06-27	The Complete Dick Tracy: Dailies & Sundays - Vol. 22	1964–1965	288	978-1-63140-901-1
23	2017-12-19	The Complete Dick Tracy: Dailies & Sundays - Vol. 23	1966–1967	264	978-1-68405-023-9
24	2018-05-22	The Complete Dick Tracy: Dailies & Sundays - Vol. 24	1967–1969	296	978-1-68405-235-6
25	2019-01-15	The Complete Dick Tracy: Dailies & Sundays - Vol. 25	1969–1970	296	978-1-68405-367-4
26	2019-06-11	The Complete Dick Tracy: Dailies & Sundays - Vol. 26	1970–1972	296	978-1-68405-471-8
27	2020-01-14	The Complete Dick Tracy: Dailies & Sundays - Vol. 27	1972–1974	296	978-1-68405-573-9
28	2020-06-23	The Complete Dick Tracy: Dailies & Sundays - Vol. 28	1974–1976	288	978-1-68405-690-3
29	2020-12-08	The Complete Dick Tracy: Dailies & Sundays - Vol. 29	1976–1977	288	978-1-68405-752-8

=== Reissued and reformatted volumes ===
From year 2023 to 2024, the six initial volumes originally published by IDW which were released in a smaller format were reissued in a reformatted version by Clover Press to match the larger format of the later volumes in the series, to make a fully coherent book suite.
