= Jungle Goddess =

1948 film by Lewis D. Collins

- Theatrical release poster
- Directed by: Lewis D. Collins
- Screenplay by: Jo Pagano
- Produced by: William Stephens
- Starring: George Reeves; Ralph Byrd; Wanda McKay
- Cinematography: Carl Berger
- Edited by: Norman A. Cerf
- Music by: Irving Gertz
- Production company: Lippert Pictures
- Distributed by: Screen Guild Productions Commonwealth Pictures reissue
- Release date: August 13, 1948 (United States)
- Running time: 62 minutes
- Country: United States
- Language: English

Jungle Goddess is a 1948 American action/adventure film starring George Reeves, Ralph Byrd, and Wanda McKay. Directed by Lewis D. Collins, the film was based on an idea by producer William Stephens.

Jungle Goddess was later featured in a Season 2 episode of Mystery Science Theater 3000.

== Plot ==
In Africa, pilot Mike Patton is persuaded by his business partner, Bob Simpson, to conduct a search for a missing heiress whose plane supposedly went down in the jungle, resulting in her never being seen again.

Encountering an indigenous tribe of natives, Bob recklessly shoots a man. He is taken before a woman, Greta, who is being treated like a high priestess. Bob is sentenced to die, but when she and Mike are alone, Greta pleads with him to help her escape.

During a struggle, a gun goes off and a guard is left dead. With the tribesmen in pursuit, Mike and Greta are betrayed by Bob, who has gone mad. But after he is killed by a spear, Mike and Greta make it to the plane and safely get away.

== Cast ==
- George Reeves as Mike Patton
- Wanda McKay as Greta Vanderhorn
- Ralph Byrd as Bob Simpson
- Armida as Wanama
- Onest Conley as drummer
- Rudy Robles as Nugara
- Jack Carroll as accompanist
- Dolores Castle as Yvonne
- Fred Coby as pilot
- Helena Grant as Mrs. Fitzhugh
- Reed Hadley as radio newscaster (uncredited)
- Sam Harris as bar patron (uncredited)
- Linda Leighton as Helen Phillips (credited as Linda Johnson)
- Smoki Whitfield as Oolonga the witch doctor
- Zack Williams as Chief M'benga

== Production notes ==
The film was the first to be produced by Robert L. Lippert's independent production company, Lippert Pictures.

Lippert borrowed George Reeves to star, and filming began in June 1948.

== Reception ==
A Los Angeles Times reviewer who saw the film in a theater called it "so corny" that the audience "died laughing when they weren't razzing on it." Despite this reaction, the film was one of the most watched movies in what were then all 48 states. In 1950 the film was shown as part of a double feature with Treasure Island at the Five Points Theatre in Birmingham, Alabama, as well as several other theaters around the state. In 1954 Jungle Goddess was shown as part of a double feature with The Lawless Nineties in several media markets.

The film was popular enough for a follow-up, Green Gold, which became Thunder in the Pines.

== Mystery Science Theater 3000 ==
Jungle Goddess was featured in episode #203 of the movie-riffing television show Mystery Science Theater 3000 (MST3K). The episode, which also featured the first installment of the serial The Phantom Creeps as a short, premiered on the Comedy Channel on October 6, 1990. MST3K writer Mary Jo Pehl observes: "This film presents the worldview paradigm that the most whitest and the most blondest gets to be the boss of everything," and she complains Greta narrates her flashbacks "like she's doing a voice-over for a coffee commercial."

In his rankings of all episodes from MST3K's first twelve seasons, Paste writer Jim Vorel placed the episode at #160. (Note: Ranking based on 197 episodes as of 2018.) Vorel calls the episode "as distasteful, racially, as you would expect a 'savages in the jungle' movie from 1948 to be," and he deplores the white savior stereotype. Vorel compares The Phantom Creeps to the series' use of Commando Cody serials, but he finds The Phantom Creeps "mercifully much more watchable."

The MST3K version of the film was included as part of the Mystery Science Theater 3000, Volume XXXI: The Turkey Day Collection DVD set, released by Shout Factory on November 25, 2014. The other episodes in the four-disc set include The Painted Hills (#510), The Screaming Skull (#912), and Squirm (#1012).

== Home media ==
In 2006, Jungle Goddess was released on Region 1 DVD in the United States by VCI Home Video. The film was paired with another title starring George Reeves, Thunder in the Pines (1948).
