= Ralph Byrd =

American actor (1909–1952)

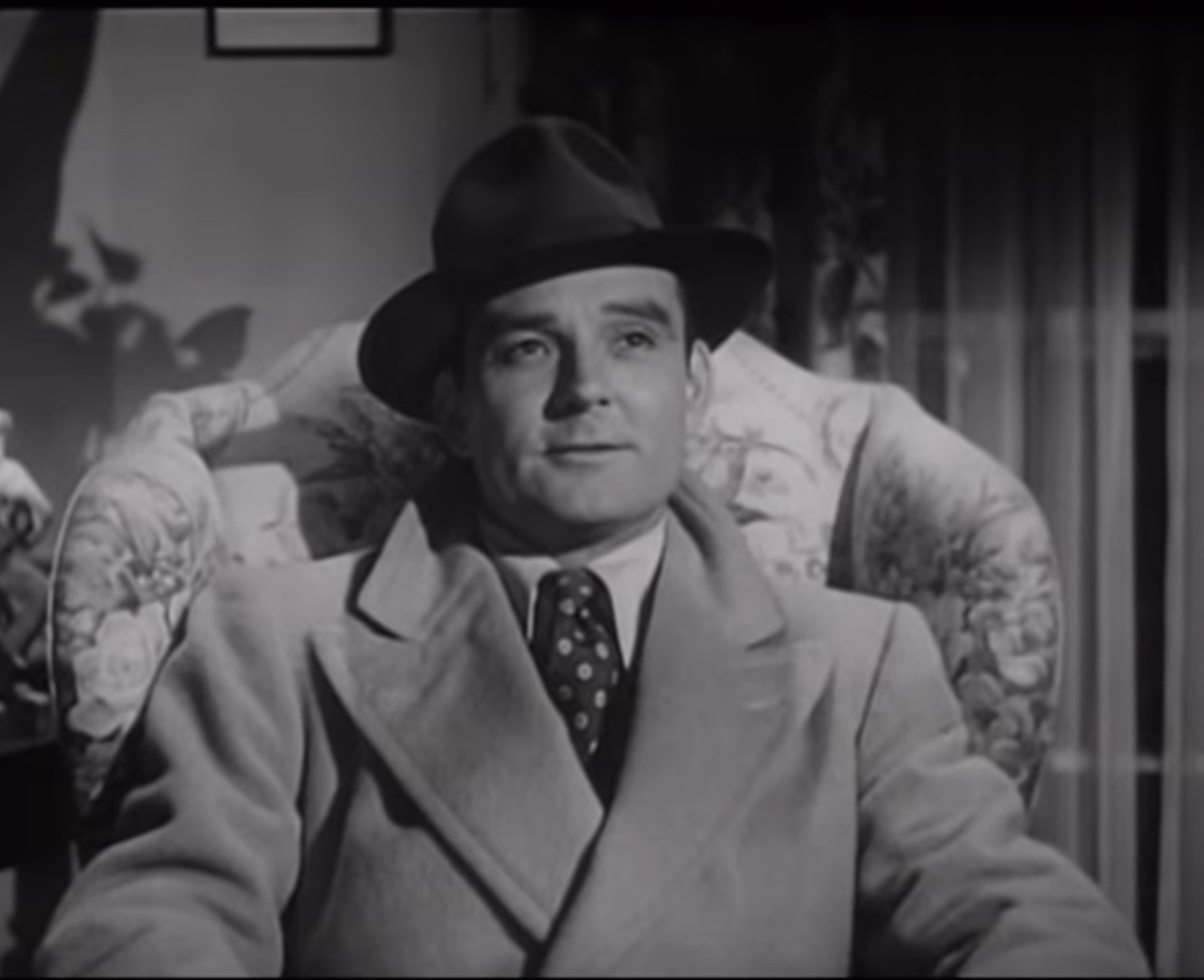
- Byrd in Dick Tracy Meets Gruesome (1947)
- Born: April 22, 1909; Dayton, Ohio, U.S.
- Died: August 18, 1952 (aged 43); Tarzana, California, U.S.
- Resting place: Forest Lawn Memorial Park, Glendale, California
- Occupation: Actor
- Years active: 1935–1952
- Spouse: Virginia Carroll (m. 1936)
- Children: 1

Ralph Byrd (April 22, 1909 – August 18, 1952) was an American actor. He was most famous for playing the comic strip character Dick Tracy on screen, in serials, feature films, and television.

== Early life and career ==
The son of George and Edna May Byrd, Ralph Byrd was born in Dayton, Ohio. Before he began acting in films, he sang and danced in theatrical productions. He debuted in movies with a bit part in Red-Headed Woman in (1932).

Once established in Republic Pictures' Dick Tracy serials (beginning in 1937), he was usually cast in action features (as a truck driver, lumberjack, cowboy, etc.).

Byrd also starred in three other serials: Blake of Scotland Yard (1937), S.O.S. Coast Guard (1937), and The Vigilante (1947).

Byrd worked regularly at both major and minor studios, from highest-budget Metro-Goldwyn-Mayer (MGM) to lowest-budget Producers Releasing Corporation (PRC). PRC could seldom afford star names but did sign Byrd for comedian Harry Langdon's comeback feature Misbehaving Husbands (1940), directed by William Beaudine. PRC and Beaudine then starred Byrd as a light comedian in two 1942 features, Duke of the Navy and Broadway Big Shot. Byrd's screen career was interrupted temporarily by military service.

Byrd co-starred with fellow action star George Reeves in two features for producer Robert L. Lippert: Jungle Goddess and Thunder in the Pines (both 1948).

== Dick Tracy ==
Republic cast Byrd as Chester Gould's comic-strip detective Dick Tracy in the 1937 serial of the same title. The film was so successful that it spawned three sequels (unheard of in serials): Dick Tracy Returns, Dick Tracy's G-Men (featuring a young Jennifer Jones, under her real name of Phylis Isley), and Dick Tracy vs. Crime Inc. (reissued in 1952 as Dick Tracy vs. the Phantom Empire).

RKO Radio Pictures made a feature film, Dick Tracy, in 1945, with character actor Morgan Conway in the title role. After two films, exhibitors complained. To them, Ralph Byrd was Dick Tracy, and only Ralph Byrd would do. RKO capitulated, and hired Byrd to finish the series. Dick Tracy's Dilemma and Dick Tracy Meets Gruesome were both released in 1947.

Byrd portrayed Tracy for one season on the Dick Tracy TV series, which premiered on the ABC network in September 1950. The 48 half-hour episodes were filmed on a breakneck schedule and a low budget, with Byrd having to do some of the strenuous stunts himself. The exertion may have contributed to a heart condition, which caused his untimely death at age 43.

== Personal life ==
He married actress and model Virginia Carroll in 1936. The couple remained together until Byrd's death in 1952.

He served in the United States Army during World War II, having been inducted into the service in San Pedro, California, in 1944.

He died of a heart attack on August 18, 1952, and is buried at Forest Lawn Memorial Park (Glendale).

== Selected filmography ==
- Red-Headed Woman (1932) as Driver with Mustache (uncredited)
- Chinatown Squad (1935) as Desk Sergeant (uncredited)
- The Adventures of Rex and Rinty (1935, Serial) as Forest Ranger Jerry Morton [Chs. 5-6] (uncredited)
- The Affair of Susan (1935) as Mechanic (uncredited)
- Hell-Ship Morgan (1936) as Dale
- Border Caballero (1936) as Tex Weaver
- Pride of the Marines (1936) as Male Nurse (uncredited)
- The Last Outlaw (1936) as Pilot (uncredited)
- The Final Hour (1936) as Department of Justice Guard (uncredited)
- Two-Fisted Gentleman (1936) as Charley
- Swing Time (1936) as Hotel Clerk (uncredited)
- Alibi for Murder (1936) as Cop (uncredited)
- A Tenderfoot Goes West (1936) as Steve
- White Legion (1936) as NCO Clerk (uncredited)
- We Who Are About to Die (1937) as Police Lab Technician (uncredited)
- Find the Witness (1937) as Tex
- Blake of Scotland Yard (1937, serial) as Dr. Jerry Sheehan
- They Wanted to Marry (1937) as Roger Coleman (uncredited)
- Sea Devils (1937) as Court-Martial Seaman (uncredited)
- Dick Tracy (1937, serial) as Dick Tracy
- Motor Madness (1937) as C.P.O. Mike Burns
- Criminals of the Air (1937) as Williamson
- They Gave Him a Gun (1937) as Wounded Soldier (uncredited)
- San Quentin (1937) as Cop on Phone (scenes deleted)
- A Fight to the Finish (1937) as Jimmy (uncredited)
- S.O.S. Coast Guard (1937, serial) as Lt. Terry Kent
- The Firefly (1937) as French Lieutenant (uncredited)
- The Trigger Trio (1937) as Larry Smith
- Paid to Dance (1937) as Nickels Brown
- Born to Be Wild (1938) as Steve Hackett
- Army Girl (1938) as Capt. Bob Marvin
- Dick Tracy Returns (1938, serial) as Dick Tracy
- Down in 'Arkansaw' (1938) as John Parker
- Fighting Thoroughbreds (1939) as Ben Marshall
- S.O.S. Tidal Wave (1939) as Jeff Shannon
- Mickey the Kid (1939) as Dr. Ben Cameron
- Dick Tracy's G-Men (1939, serial) as Dick Tracy
- The Captain Is a Lady (1940) as Randy - Seaman (uncredited)
- The Golden Fleecing (1940) as Larry Kelly
- The Howards of Virginia (1940) as James Howard
- Dulcy (1940) as Businessman in Meeting (uncredited)
- Drums of the Desert (1940) as Paul Dumont
- North West Mounted Police (1940) as Constable Ackroyd
- The Mark of Zorro (1940) as Student / Officer (uncredited)
- Dark Streets of Cairo (1940) as Dennis Martin
- The Son of Monte Cristo (1940) as William Gluck
- Misbehaving Husbands (1940) as Bob Grant
- Play Girl (1941) as Miami Doctor (uncredited)
- The Penalty (1941) as Brock
- Power Dive (1941) as Jackson - Draftsman
- Desperate Cargo (1941) as Tony Bronson
- Dr. Kildare's Wedding Day (1941) as Policeman (uncredited)
- Navy Blues (1941) as Lieutenant (uncredited)
- A Yank in the R.A.F. (1941) as Al Bennett
- Dick Tracy vs. Crime Inc. (1941, serial) as Dick Tracy
- Duke of the Navy (1942) as Breezy Duke
- Broadway Big Shot (1942) as Jimmy O'Brien
- Rudyard Kipling's Jungle Book (1942) as Durga
- Moontide (1942) as Rev. Wilson
- Ten Gentlemen from West Point (1942) as Maloney
- Careful, Soft Shoulder (1942) as Elliott Salmon
- Manila Calling (1942) as Corbett
- Time to Kill (1942) as Lou Venter, bodyguard
- Margin for Error (1943) as Pete - Dice-Playing Soldier (uncredited)
- The Meanest Man in the World (1943) as Reporter (uncredited)
- They Came to Blow Up America (1943) as Burkhardt
- Guadalcanal Diary (1943) as Ned Rowman
- December 7th: The Movie (1943) as Reporter (uncredited)
- Four Jills in a Jeep (1944) as Sergeant in Mess Hall (uncredited)
- Tampico (1944) as Quartermaster O'Brien (uncredited)
- Stallion Road (1947) as Richmond Mallard
- Dick Tracy's Dilemma (1947) as Dick Tracy
- The Vigilante (1947, serial) as Greg Sanders, the Vigilante
- Dick Tracy Meets Gruesome (1947) as Dick Tracy
- The Argyle Secrets (1948) as Police Lt. Samuel Samson
- Stage Struck (1948) as Police Sgt. Tom Ramey
- Canon City (1948) as Officer Gray
- Jungle Goddess (1948) as Bob Simpson
- Thunder in the Pines (1948) as "Boomer" Benson
- Radar Secret Service (1950) as Static
- Union Station (1950) as Priest (uncredited)
- The Redhead and the Cowboy (1951) as Capt. Andrews
- Lightning Strikes Twice (1951) as Jack Ross, Hair Tonic Salesman on Bus (uncredited)
- Double Crossbones (1951) as Will - Debtor (uncredited)
- Close to My Heart (1951) as Charlie (uncredited)
- My Favorite Spy (1951) as Official (uncredited)
- Bugles in the Afternoon (1952) as First officer (uncredited)
