= Thunder in the Pines =

1948 film by Robert Gordon

- Directed by: Robert Edwards (pseudonym for Robert Gordon)
- Written by: Maurice Tombragel
- Based on: story by Jo Pagano
- Produced by: William Stephens executive Robert L. Lippert
- Starring: George Reeves
- Music by: Raoul Kraushaar; Lucien Cailliet
- Production company: Lippert Pictures
- Distributed by: Screen Guild Productions
- Release date: November 11, 1948
- Running time: 61 minutes
- Country: United States
- Language: English

Thunder in the Pines is a 1948 American comedy-adventure film directed by Robert Edwards (a pseudonym for Robert Gordon) and starring George Reeves and Ralph Byrd. The film was shot in Sepiatone. It was executive produced by Robert L. Lippert.

== Production ==
Reeves and Byrd and producer William Stephens had just made Jungle Goddess for Lippert and were signed for this follow up, originally called Green Gold. It was reported the film would be the first of 12 movies Stephens would make for Lippert "which is a hearty assignment for a moviemaker but apparently Stephens has a formula for production", according to the Los Angeles Times.

Filming started in early September, 1948, at Nassour Studios.

Inspired by Jungle Goddess, producer William Stephens announced he wanted to make four films a year starring Reeves and Byrd as a "Captain Flagg-Sergeant Quirt sort of team", starting with this one. The second one would be Banana Boat by John Wilste. (Stephens was also going to make Three Alarm Fire by Arthur Caesar.) However conditions to film background scenes in South America, where Banana Fleet was set, were not ideal so instead Stephens made Hell on Wheels (which became Highway 13, also based on a story by Wilste). Neither Reeves nor Byrd starred in that film.
