= Dick Tracy (serial) =

- Directed by: Alan James; Ray Taylor
- Written by: Morgan B. Cox; George Morgan; Barry Shipman; Winston Miller; Chester Gould (comic strip)
- Produced by: Nat Levine; J. Laurence Wickland (Associate)
- Starring: Ralph Byrd; Kay Hughes; Smiley Burnette; Lee Van Atta; John Picorri; Carleton Young; Fred Hamilton; Francis X. Bushman; Byron Foulger
- Cinematography: William Nobles; Edgar Lyons
- Edited by: Helene Turner; Edward Todd; William Witney
- Music by: Harry Grey
- Distributed by: Republic Pictures
- Release dates: February 20, 1937 (U.S. serial); December 27, 1937 (U.S. feature)
- Running time: 15 chapters / 290 minutes (serial); 73 minutes (feature)
- Country: United States
- Language: English
- Budget: $112,334 (negative cost: $127,640)

Dick Tracy, Chapter 1: The Spider Strikes

Dick Tracy (1937) is a 15-chapter Republic movie serial starring Ralph Byrd based on the Dick Tracy comic strip by Chester Gould. It was directed by Alan James and Ray Taylor.

There were three sequels to this serial: Dick Tracy Returns (1938), Dick Tracy's G-Men (1939), and Dick Tracy vs. Crime, Inc. (1941).

== Plot ==
Dick Tracy's foe for this serial is the crime boss and masked mystery villain the Spider/the Lame One (both names are used) and his Spider Ring. In the process of committing various crimes, including using his flying wing and sound weapon to destroy the Bay Bridge in San Francisco and stealing an experimental "speed plane", The Spider captures Dick Tracy's brother, Gordon. The Spider's minion, Dr. Moloch, performs a brain operation on Gordon Tracy to turn him evil, making him secretly part of the Spider Ring and so turning brother against brother.

== Cast ==
=== Starring cast ===
- Ralph Byrd as Dick Tracy
- Kay Hughes as Gwen Andrews
- Smiley Burnette as Mike McGurk
- Lee Van Atta as Junior
- John Picorri as Dr Moloch
- Richard Beach as Gordon Tracy (pre-operation in Chapter 1)
- Carleton Young as Gordon Tracy (post-operation in Chapter 1)
- Fred Hamilton as Steve Lockwood
- Francis X. Bushman as Clive Anderson

The above cast members appear in the opening credits in "cameo" display — sequential pictures of each actor with his/her name (and sometimes character name) superimposed at the bottom of the screen — for the first episode, followed by a listing of supporting players. Subsequent chapters simply listed the stars on one screen and the same supporting cast a second.

=== Supporting cast ===
- John Dilson as Ellery Brewster
- Wedgwood Nowell as H. T. Clayton
- Theodore Lorch as Paterno
- Edwin Stanley as Walter Odette
- Harrison Greene as Cloggerstein
- Herbert Weber as Tony Martino
- Buddy Roosevelt as Burke
- George DeNormand as Flynn
- Byron K. Foulger as Kovitch

The above cast members appear in the opening credits as simply a list of the actor's names.

== Production ==
Dick Tracy was budgeted at $112,334 although the final negative cost was $127,640 (a $15,306, or 13.6%, overspend). It was the most expensive Republic serial until S O S Coast Guard was released later in the year.

It was filmed between 30 November and 24 December 1936 under the working titles Adventures of Dick Tracy and The Spider Ring. The serial's production number was 420.

In this serial, Dick Tracy is a G-Man (FBI) in San Francisco rather than a Midwestern city police detective as in the comic strip. Most of the Dick Tracy supporting cast and rogues gallery were also dropped and new, original characters used instead (for instance the characters of Tracy's girlfriend Gwen Andrews and his detective partner Mike McGurk were stand-ins for Tess Trueheart and Pat Patton respectively). Dick Tracy creator Chester Gould approved the script despite these changes.

There were three sequels to this serial: Dick Tracy Returns (1938), Dick Tracy's G-Men (1939), and Dick Tracy vs. Crime, Inc. (1941). They were all permitted by an interpretation of the original contract, which allowed a "series or serial". That meant that Dick Tracy's creator, Chester Gould, was only paid for the rights to produce this serial but not for any of the sequels.

=== Stunts ===
- George DeNormand as Dick Tracy (doubling Ralph Byrd)
- Loren Riebe (doubling Jack Gardner)

=== Special effects ===
- John T. Coyle
- The Lydecker brothers

== Release ==
=== Theatrical ===
Dick Tracy's official release date is 20 February 1937, although this is actually the date the seventh chapter was made available to film exchanges.

Alpha Video released the serial on two DVDs in 2003. Volume 1 contains Chapters 1 through 7, and Volume 2 contains Chapters 8 through 15. VCI released all four Dick Tracy serials on DVD in 2008 separately, then put them all out together in one boxed set in 2012.

A 73-minute feature film version, created by editing the serial footage together, was reported by Jack Mathis to have been released on 27 December 1937, based on a single memo in the Republic Pictures corporate papers files; however, no evidence of any showing of this film, at least within the United States, has ever been located, nor any other evidence that such a feature version was even made. The only known feature version of this serial is a direct-to-TV movie edited and syndicated in the late 1980s, and subsequently made available on videotape and DVD (most recently, under the altered title Dick Tracy and the Spider Gang).

== Critical reception ==
Cline states that the Dick Tracy serials were "unexcelled in the action field," adding that "in any listing of serials released after 1930, the four Dick Tracy adventures from Republic must stand out as classics of the suspense detective thrillers, and the models for many others to follow." He goes on to write that Ralph Byrd "played the part [of Dick Tracy] to the hilt, giving his portrayal such unbridled, exuberant enthusiasm that the resulting excitement was contagious." Byrd become identified with the character following the release of this serial. The final chapter reunion between Dick and Gordon Tracy, as Gordon lies dying and his memory returns, is "one of the few moments of real emotional drama ever attempted in serials". This added to the human quality of Dick Tracy, which was present in both this serial and Chester Gould's original strip.

== Chapter titles ==
1. The Spider Strikes
2. The Bridge of Terror
3. The Fur Pirates
4. Death Rides the Sky
5. Brother Against Brother
6. Dangerous Waters
7. The Ghost Town Mystery
8. Battle in the Clouds
9. The Stratosphere Adventure
10. The Gold Ship
11. Harbor Pursuit
12. The Trail of the Spider — re-cap chapter
13. The Fire Trap
14. The Devil in White
15. Brothers United

_{Source:}

Dick Tracy was the only 15-chapter serial released by Republic in 1937.

== References in other films ==
- The cliffhanger for chapter three, a motorboat chase, is copied in the movie Indiana Jones and the Last Crusade (1989).
- The Spider's flying wing was reused for the later, unconnected, Republic serial The Fighting Devil Dogs (1938).
