= Dick Tracy (TV pilot) =

- Genre: Action; Adventure
- Written by: Hal Fimberg
- Starring: Ray MacDonnell; Victor Buono; Davey Davison
- Theme music composer: The Ventures
- Opening theme: "Dick Tracy" performed by the Ventures
- Composer: Billy May
- Country of origin: United States
- Original language: English
- No. of seasons: 1
- No. of episodes: 1

Production
- Executive producer: William Dozier
- Producer: James Fonda
- Cinematography: Frederick Gately
- Editors: Fred R. Feitshans Jr.; Noel Scott
- Running time: 30 min.
- Production companies: Greenway Productions; 20th Century-Fox Television

Original release
- Network: NBC

Dick Tracy is an American unsold action television pilot adapted from the comic strip of the same name by Chester Gould. It was produced during the 1966–1967 television season and filmed by 20th Century-Fox.

== Cast ==
- Ray MacDonnell as Dick Tracy
- Victor Buono as Mr. Memory
- Davey Davison as Tess Trueheart Tracy
- Jan Shutan as Lizz
- Ken Mayer as Chief Patton
- Monroe Arnold as Sam Catchem
- Jay Blood as Junior
- Eve Plumb as Bonnie Braids
- Allen Jaffe as Hook

== Production ==
The pilot was produced by William Dozier who had also made the TV series Batman and The Green Hornet. According to Dozier, while the pilot was made nobody wanted it with Dozier theorizing it wasn't "far out" enough. NBC considered the show for both the 1966–67 and 1967–68 Fall schedules, but with producer Dozier's series The Tammy Grimes Show and The Green Hornet cancelled as well as the significant ratings drop experienced by Batman, NBC likely lost confidence in the viability of the project.
