= Dick Tracy vs. Cueball =

1946 film by Gordon Douglas

- Theatrical poster
- Directed by: Gordon M. Douglas; James Anderson (assistant)
- Screenplay by: Dane Lussier; Robert E. Kent
- Story by: Luci Ward
- Based on: characters in Dick Tracy by Chester Gould
- Produced by: Herman Schlom
- Starring: Morgan Conway; Dick Wessel; Esther Howard
- Cinematography: George E. Diskant
- Edited by: Philip Martin
- Music by: Phil Ohman
- Production company: RKO Radio Pictures
- Distributed by: RKO Radio Pictures
- Release dates: November 22, 1946 (New York City); December 18, 1946 (U.S.)
- Running time: 62 minutes
- Country: United States
- Language: English

Dick Tracy vs. Cueball is a 1946 American action film based on the 1930s comic strip character of the same name created by Chester Gould. The film stars Morgan Conway as Dick Tracy in the second installment of the Dick Tracy film series released by RKO Radio Pictures.

== Plot ==
Lester Abbott is carrying stolen diamonds he intends to sell to gem dealer Jules Sparkle, but Abbott is robbed and strangled by ex-convict Harry Lake, nicknamed Cueball for his round, bald head. Accomplices Simon Little and Mona Clyde have arranged with crooked antiques dealer Percival Priceless to pay off Cueball with a few thousand dollars, and then resell the gems for a fortune, splitting the proceeds three ways.

Cueball hides out at the Dripping Dagger bar. Proprietor Filthy Flora knows he has the diamonds. Meanwhile, detectives Dick Tracy and Pat Patton visit Sparkle's establishment to question him. The detectives become suspicious of Little and Clyde. Tracy enlists his friend, aging thespian Vitamin Flintheart, to visit the shop the next day and observe any suspicious activity.

Priceless goes to Cueball's room to complete the transaction for the diamonds, not realizing that Tracy and Patton are tailing him. Cueball sees the detectives in the bar and becomes enraged. Suspecting Priceless of treachery, Cueball strangles him. Later, Flora searches Cueball's room for the diamonds. She finds and steals them -- but Cueball witnesses the theft and murders her.

Cueball's method of strangling his victims with a braided leather hatband provides the police with a clue to his identity. Hoping to lure him out of hiding, Tracy allows his girlfriend Tess Trueheart to meet with Little and Clyde to buy the diamonds. Before she can meet them she is kidnapped by Cueball. A chase ensues in a railroad yard late at night.

== Cast ==
- Morgan Conway as Dick Tracy
- Anne Jeffreys as Tess Trueheart
- Lyle Latell as Pat Patton
- Rita Corday as Mona Clyde
- Ian Keith as Vitamin Flintheart
- Dick Wessel as Harry Lake, "Cueball"
- Douglas Walton as Percival Priceless
- Esther Howard as Filthy Flora
- Joseph Crehan as Chief Brandon
- Byron Foulger as Simon Little
- Jimmy Crane as Junior, Tracy's adopted son
- Milton Parsons as Higby, assistant to Priceless
- Skelton Knaggs as Rudolph, accomplice and diamond cutter
- Ralph Dunn as Policeman
- Dorothy Granger as Policewoman

== Reception ==
"Devotees of the comic strip detective will love this one. Plenty of action," said Film Daily. "There's not a dull moment from start to finish and the conclusion is a rousing gun battle, probably one of the noisiest this season. This is solid thrill entertainment. As an item for the doubles [double-feature theaters] it is first-rate. The pace is fast, the story easily followed."

"Second in RKO's Dick Tracy series, this is even better than the first," reported Film Bulletin. "An exciting programmer replete with murder, mayhem, and villainy of all kinds, Dick Tracy vs. Cueball is action fare at its best. This should gross strongly in action houses and make an above-average supporting dualler [part of a dual bill, or double feature program] in all except first-runs. It's surefire wherever the youngsters and thrill-hungry males abound.

National Box Office Digest agreed: "Dick Tracy vs. Cueball can ask no better recommendation than to say that it will satisfy the Tracy fans -- and that it does. Intelligent melodramatic picture-making is the answer to a budget subject that does very well by its alloted 62 minutes." Charles L. Franke of Motion Picture Daily approved: "Studded with many fresh, exciting touches -- credit for same going to director Gordon M. Douglas, who must have relished this assignment -- this number is essentially straightaway cops-and-robbers fare. All of the characterizations are good, but especially so is that of Vitamin Flintheart, played by Ian Keith." Variety called the film "Hot action celluloid that's bang-up and bang-bang from start to finish."
