= Ray MacDonnell =

American actor (1928–2021)

- Born: March 5, 1928; Lawrence, Massachusetts, U.S.
- Died: June 10, 2021 (aged 93); Chappaqua, New York, U.S.
- Occupation: Actor
- Years active: 1953–2013
- Spouse: Patricia Anne Broderick (1961-2021)
- Children: 3

Ray MacDonnell (March 5, 1928 – June 10, 2021) was an American television actor, best known for his role as Dr. Joe Martin, patriarch of the Martin family, on the daytime soap opera All My Children, a role he played for 40 years.

== Early years ==
MacDonnell was born on March 5, 1928, in Lawrence, Massachusetts. He attended Amherst College subsequently receiving a Fulbright Scholarship to London's Royal Academy of Dramatic Arts.

== Career ==
MacDonnell received a Daytime Emmy Award for Lifetime Achievement in 2004. Prior to appearing on All My Children, he played Philip Capice on the soap The Edge of Night from 1961 to 69. Other credits included Mame on Broadway from 1966 to 1970, and as Dick Tracy in the 1967 TV pilot of the same name.

In 2009, MacDonnell retired from All My Children. Production of the show moved from New York to California, marking the end of his 40-year run. His retirement from All My Children left Susan Lucci, portrayer of Erica Kane, as the only original cast member on the show. In 2011, it was announced that MacDonnell along with on-screen wife, Lee Meriwether as Ruth Martin, would be making a limited return to All My Children. MacDonnell also returned to All My Children for its finale which aired on September 23, 2011.

== Personal life and death ==
In 1961, MacDonnell married Patricia Anne Broderick. They had three children- Sarah, Kyle, and Daniel.

He died at his home in Chappaqua, New York, on June 10, 2021, at the age of 93.
