= Jack Lambert (American actor) =

American actor (1920–2002)

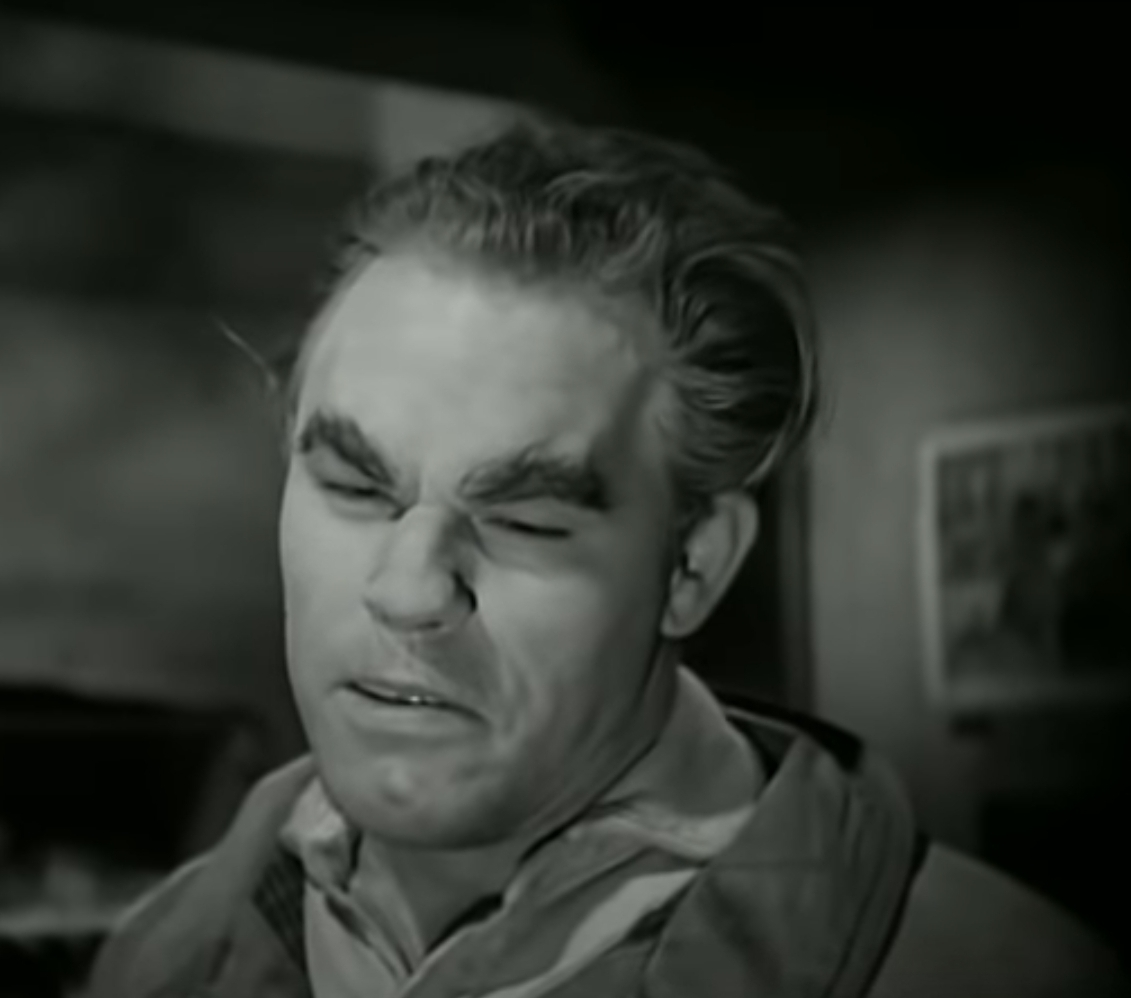
- Lambert in Dick Tracy's Dilemma (1947)
- Born: John Taylor Lambert; April 13, 1920; Yonkers, New York, U.S.
- Died: February 18, 2002 (aged 81); Carmel, California, U.S.
- Occupation: Actor
- Years active: 1942–1970
- Spouses: Frances Dalton (divorced) Marjorie Hall (m. 1958)
- Children: 1

John Taylor Lambert (April 13, 1920 – February 18, 2002) was an American character actor who specialized in playing movie tough guys and heavies. He is best known for playing the psychotic cat-loving, iron-hooked Steve "the Claw" Michel in Dick Tracy's Dilemma.

== Career ==
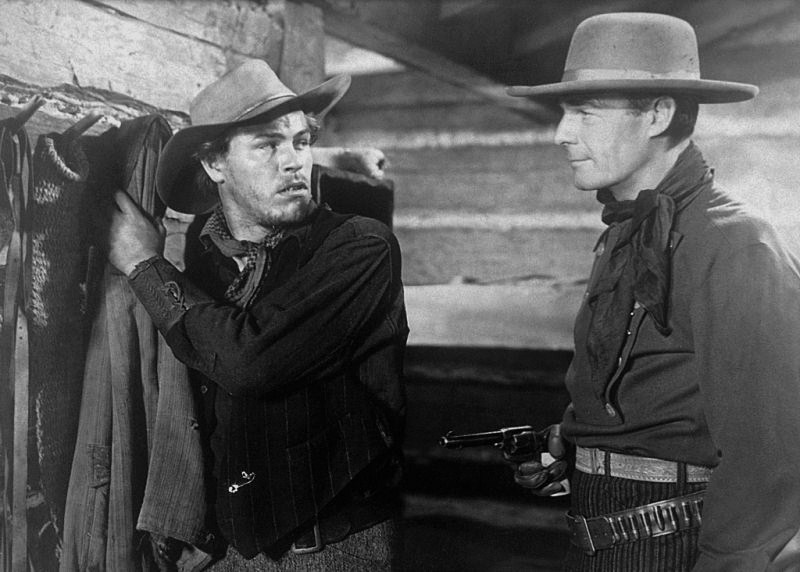
Lambert and Randolph Scott in Abilene Town (1946)

Following a spell on Broadway, the Yonkers, New York-born Lambert moved to Hollywood and began working in films in 1942. He was a familiar figure in Westerns and crime dramas after World War II, in such movies as The Killers with Burt Lancaster and Ava Gardner, The Enforcer with Humphrey Bogart, Bend of the River with James Stewart, Vera Cruz with Gary Cooper and Burt Lancaster, Kiss Me Deadly with Ralph Meeker as Mike Hammer, and How the West Was Won.

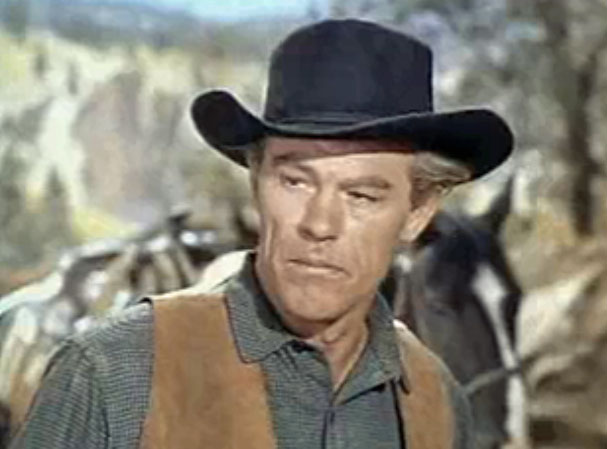
Lambert in Bonanza (1960)

Lambert also appeared in many television series of the 1950s and 1960s, such as Rod Cameron's State Trooper, twice on Bat Masterson (1959 in S1E22's "Incident in Leadville" and again in 1961 in S3E19's "Bullwhacker’s Bounty"), Gunsmoke (as all evil gunman Kin Creed in the 1959 S4E35 episode “There Never Was A Horse”, where he likely was the only man in the show's 20 year run who ever outdrew Matt Dillon - but missed), Have Gun – Will Travel, Sugarfoot, Tales of Wells Fargo, Daniel Boone, Wagon Train, Bonanza, Get Smart (season one, episode 18, 1966) and The Andy Griffith Show (season three, episode 32, 1963, "The Big House") From 1959 to 1960, Lambert was a regular cast member (as Joshua Walcek, sometimes called "Joshua MacGregor"), in 23 of the 42 episodes of the Darren McGavin series, Riverboat.

== Personal life ==
In 1959 Lambert moved into a home in Palm Springs, California, owned by his wife Marjorie Franklin (who owned the home with her divorced husband Alexander Hall). He had a son, Lee J. Lambert.

Lambert is not to be confused with the British character actor with the same name who died in 1976.

== Partial filmography ==
Year	Film	Role	Director	Notes
1943	Stage Door Canteen	Sailor Cutting In with Ina Claire	Frank Borzage	uncredited
1943	Follies Girl	Unconfirmed Bit Part		uncredited
1943	Bomber's Moon	Curly	Edward Ludwig (as "Charles Fuhr"); Harold D. Schuster (as "Charles Fuhr"); John Brahm (uncredited); Robert Florey (2nd unit aerial sequences)	tail gunner
1943	Hostages	SS guard	Frank Tuttle	
1943	Seeds of Freedom	Speaker		
1943	Swing Fever	Jack (Conlon's Henchman)	Tim Whelan	uncredited
1943	The Cross of Lorraine	Jacques	Tay Garnett	
1943	Lost Angel	Lefty Moran	Roy Rowland	uncredited
1944	The Canterville Ghost	Trigger, Machine Gunner	Norman Z. McLeod (uncredited)	uncredited
1944	Till We Meet Again	Drunken German Soldier	Frank Borzage	uncredited
1945	The Hidden Eye	Louie	Richard Whorf	
1945	Duffy's Tavern	Waiter	Hal Walker	uncredited
1946	Abilene Town	Jet Younger	Edwin L. Marin	
1946	The Harvey Girls	Marty Peters	Robert Alton	
1946	The Hoodlum Saint	Minor Role	Norman Taurog	uncredited
1946	O.S.S.	SS Lieutenant	Irving Pichel	uncredited
1946	The Killers	'Dum-Dum' Clarke	Robert Siodmak	
1946	Plainsman and the Lady	Sival	Joseph Kane	
1947	New Orleans	Biff Lewis	Arthur Lubin	
1947	Dick Tracy's Dilemma	Steve 'The Claw' Michel	John Rawlins	
1947	The Vigilantes Return	Henchman Ben Borden	Ray Taylor	
1947	The Unsuspected	Mr. Press	Michael Curtiz	
1948	Reaching from Heaven	Buck Huggins	Frank Strayer	
1948	River Lady	Swede	George Sherman	
1948	Belle Starr's Daughter	Bronc Wilson	Lesley Selander	
1948	Disaster	Frosty Davenport		
1948	Force of Evil		Abraham Polonsky	uncredited
1949	Big Jack	Bud Valentine	Richard Thorpe	
1949	The Great Gatsby	Reba	Elliott Nugent	
1949	Yes Sir, That's My Baby	Leslie Schultze	George Sherman	
1949	Brimstone	Luke Courteen	Joseph Kane	
1949	Border Incident	Chuck	Anthony Mann	uncredited
1950	Dakota Lil	Dummy	Lesley Selander	
1950	Stars in My Crown	Perry Lokey	Jacques Tourneur	
1950	North of the Great Divide	Henchman Stagg	William Witney	
1951	The Enforcer	Philadelphia Tom Zaca	Bretaigne Windust	
1951	The Secret of Convict Lake	Matt Anderson	Michael Gordon	uncredited
1952	Bend of the River	Red	Anthony Mann	
1952	Montana Belle	Ringo	Allan Dwan	
1952	Blackbeard the Pirate	Tom Whetstone	Raoul Walsh	
1953	Scared Stiff	Zombie	George Marshall	
1953	99 River Street	Mickey	Phil Karlson	
1954	Vera Cruz	Charlie	Robert Aldrich	
1955	Run for Cover	Larsen	Nicholas Ray	
1955	Kiss Me Deadly	Sugar Smallhouse	Robert Aldrich	
1955	At Gunpoint	Kirk	Alfred L. Werker	
1956	Alfred Hitchcock Presents	Baldy	Herschel Daugherty	Season 2 Episode 11: "The Better Bargain"
1956	Backlash	Mike Benton	John Sturges	
1956	Canyon River	Kincaid	Harmon Jones	
1957	Chicago Confidential	Smitty	Sidney Salkow	uncredited
1958	Machine-Gun Kelly	Howard	Roger Corman	
1958	Hot Car Girl	Cop #1 at soda bar	Bernard L. Kowalski	
1958	Party Girl	Nick	Nicholas Ray	uncredited
1959	Alfred Hitchcock Presents	Hitman	Bretaigne Windust	Season 4 Episode 26: "Cheap is Cheap"
1959	Alfred Hitchcock Presents	Garage Mechanic	Herschel Daugherty	Season 5 Episode 4: "Coyote Moon"
1959	Alias Jesse James	Snake Brice	Norman Z. McLeod	uncredited
1959	Day Of The Outlaw	Tex	Andre de Toth	Bruhn's gang
1960	Freckles	Duncan	Andrew McLaglen	
1961	The George Raft Story	Jerry Fitzpatrick	Joseph M. Newman	
1962	How the West Was Won	Gant Henchman		uncredited
1963	4 for Texas	Monk	Robert Aldrich	
