= Dick Tracy vs. Crime, Inc. =

1941 film by John English, William Witney

- Directed by: William Witney; John English
- Written by: Ronald Davidson; Norman S. Hall; William Lively; Joseph O'Donnell; Joseph Poland; Chester Gould (comic strip)
- Produced by: William J. O'Sullivan
- Starring: Ralph Byrd; Michael Owen; Jan Wiley; John Davidson; Ralph Morgan; Kenneth Harlan; John Dilson; Howard C. Hickman
- Cinematography: Reggie Lanning
- Distributed by: Republic Pictures
- Release dates: December 27, 1941 (U.S. serial); October 8, 1952 (U.S. re-release)
- Running time: 15 chapters / 269 minutes
- Country: United States
- Language: English
- Budget: $174,539 (negative cost: $175,919)

Dick Tracy vs. Crime, Inc. (1941) is a Republic Movie serial based on the Dick Tracy comic strip. It was directed by the team of William Witney and John English with Ralph Byrd reprising his role from the earlier serials. It was the last of the four Dick Tracy serials produced by Republic, although Ralph Byrd went on to portray the character again in two features and on television.

== Plot ==
Dick Tracy and his allies find themselves up against a villain known as The Ghost, with the impossible ability of becoming invisible.

== Cast ==
=== Main cast ===
- Ralph Byrd as Dick Tracy
- Michael Owen as Bil Carr
- Jan Wiley as June 'Eve' Chandler
- John Davidson as Lucifer
- Ralph Morgan as J.P. Morton/the Ghost

=== Supporting cast ===
- Kenneth Harlan as Police Lt Cosgrove
- John Dilson as Henry Weldon
- Howard C. Hickman as Stephen Chandler
- Robert Frazer as Daniel Brewster
- Robert Fiske as Walter Cabot
- Jack Mulhall as Jim Wilson
- Hooper Atchley as Arthur Trent
- Anthony Warde as John Corey
- Chuck Morrison as Trask
- Forrest Taylor as Netzikoff's Butler

== Production ==
Dick Tracy vs. Crime, Inc. cost $175,919 (a $1,380 overspend).

It was filmed between September 17 and October 24, 1941 under the working titles Dick Tracy Strikes Again and Dick Tracy's Revenge. The serial's production number was 1097.

The scenes of giant waves hitting New York were recycled from the RKO Pictures film Deluge.

=== Cliffhangers ===
Most of the cliffhangers were stock footage from previous Dick Tracy serials. However, the reuse of the highlights of previous Dick Tracy serials actually added to this serial, making it seem like a "best of" compilation.

== Release ==
=== Theatrical ===
Dick Tracy vs. Crime, Inc.'s official release date is December 27, 1941, during Christmas week 1941, although this is actually the date the seventh chapter was made available to film exchanges.

The serial was re-released on October 8, 1952, under the title Dick Tracy vs. Phantom Empire, between the first runs of Zombies of the Stratosphere and Jungle Drums of Africa.

VCI released the serial on 2 DVD discs in 2008. It was later released together with the other three Dick Tracy serials in a boxed DVD set by VCI in 2013.

== Critical reception ==
Cline states that the Dick Tracy serials were "unexcelled in the action field," adding that "in any listing of serials released after 1930, the four Dick Tracy adventures from Republic must stand out as classics of the suspense detective thrillers, and the models for many others to follow." He goes on to describe Dick Tracy vs. Crime, Inc. as one of the most outstanding of all serials.

This was a popular serial when first released, and in the opinion of Harmon and Glut, the best of the Dick Tracy serials.

== Chapter titles ==
1. The Fatal Hour (28 min 12s)
2. The Prisoner Vanishes (16 min 51s)
3. Doom Patrol (16 min 52s)
4. Dead Man's Trap (16 min 44s)
5. Murder at Sea (16 min 41s)
6. Besieged (16 min 42s)
7. Sea Racketeers (16 min 58s)
8. Train of Doom (16 min 48s)
9. Beheaded (16 min 46s)
10. Flaming Peril (16 min 58s)
11. Seconds to Live (16 min 41s)
12. Trial by Fire (16 min 41s)
13. The Challenge (16 min 45s)
14. Invisible Terror (16 min 40s)
15. Retribution (16 min 43s)

_{Source:}

== See also ==
- List of film serials by year
- List of film serials by studio

Preceded by King of the Texas Rangers (1941)	Republic Serial; Dick Tracy vs. Crime, Inc. (1941)	Succeeded by Spy Smasher (1942)
Preceded by Dick Tracy's G-Men (1939)	Dick Tracy Serial; Dick Tracy vs. Crime, Inc. (1941)	Succeeded by none
Preceded by King of the Texas Rangers (1941)	Witney-English Serial; Dick Tracy vs. Crime, Inc. (1941)	Succeeded by none
