= Rick Fletcher =

American artist

Richard E. Fletcher (June 1, 1916 – March 16, 1983) was an American artist best known for his illustration of the Dick Tracy comic strip. Fletcher assisted Chester Gould on the strip for sixteen years, then drew it himself after Gould's retirement in 1977. Fletcher produced Dick Tracy for another six years, until his death in 1983.

== Early life ==
Richard E. Fletcher was born and raised in Burlington, Iowa, the son of Maude and William Fletcher. In 1934, his family moved to Galesburg, Illinois, and the following year he became an advertising artist at the Tri-City Star and later an art director for the Rudy A. Moritz Advertising Agency in Davenport, Iowa.

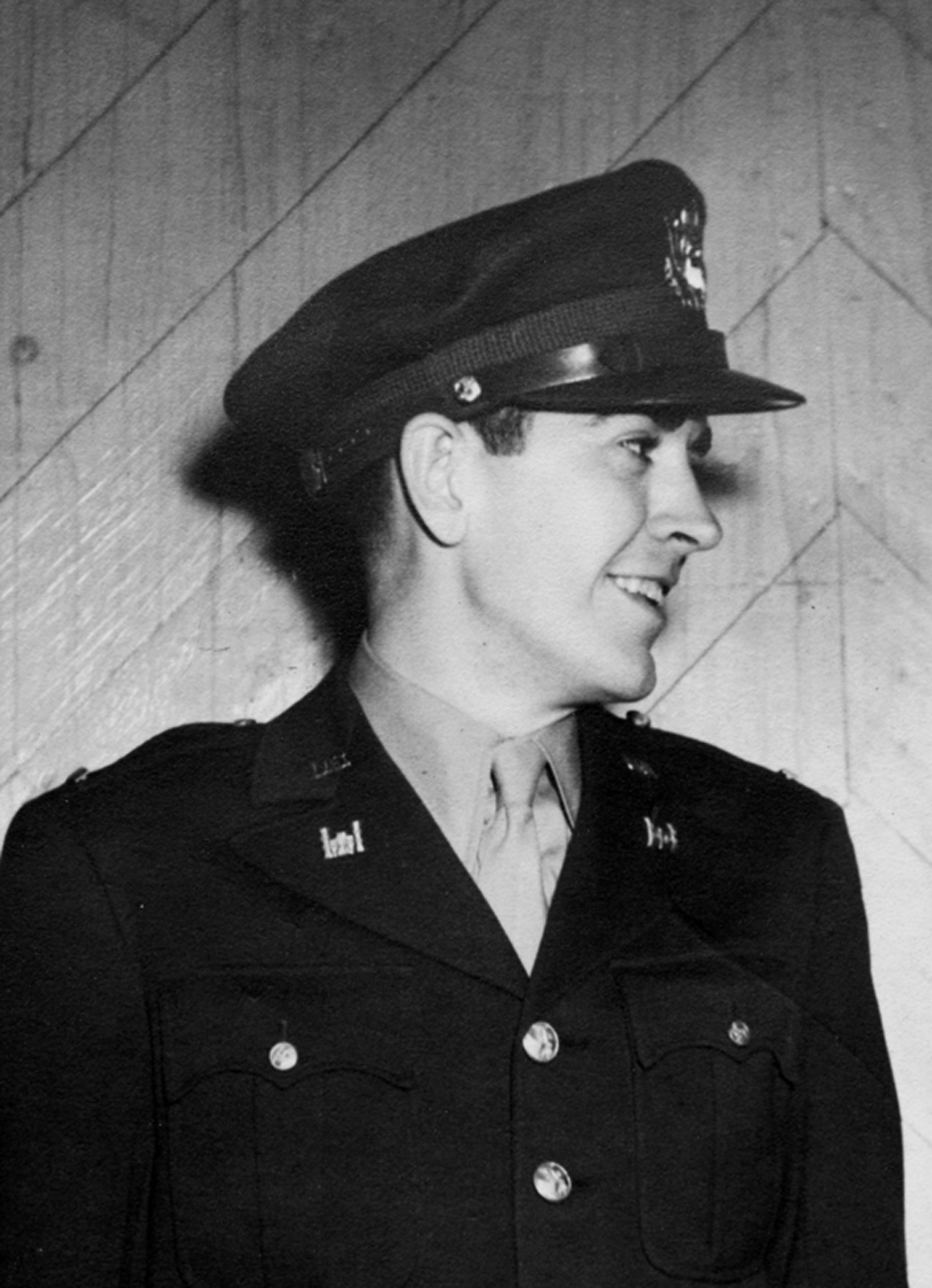

== World War II ==
In 1942, Fletcher's career was interrupted by World War II. He enlisted at Camp Dodge, Iowa and attended Officer Candidate School in Fort Belvoir, Virginia. A year later, he was commissioned in the Corps of Engineers and assigned as a 1st Lieutenant S-1 Adjutant to the 308th Engineer Combat Battalion Headquarters with the 83rd Infantry Division.

Fletcher went through five European military campaigns: from D-Day +12 at Omaha Beach, France, fighting in the hedgerows of Normandy, relieving the 101st Airborne in Carentan France, fighting through France to Belgium, the Netherlands and Germany. He fought in the Battle of the Bulge and the Hurtgen Forest. When General Dwight D. Eisenhower ordered all armies to halt, Fletcher and the 83rd Infantry Division were less than two hours away from Hitler hiding in his bunker. The Russian Army raided the bunker two weeks later.

At the end of the war, Fletcher served as Commanding Officer of the Sonndorf Prisoner of War Camp in Germany, and Contracting Officer to build camps for displaced persons and prisoners of war. He received the Bronze Star Medal for distinguishing himself by meritorious service in connection with military operations against the enemy of the United States. He was awarded the Purple Heart but declined it because he felt his wounds weren't as serious as those of his fellow soldiers. Fletcher also spent time during the war taking photographs with his 35mm Leica camera to document his journey through Europe. He returned to the United States on New Year's Day 1946. His name is inscribed in the Book of Honor at the Court of Patriots in Rock Island, Illinois where he and his wife are buried in the National Cemetery.

== Post-war activities ==
After the war, Fletcher went to Chicago, Illinois to start his life and career, and in 1946 he was offered a job at the Chicago Tribune in the advertising art department. He met his sister's roommate, Beverly Crosbie; the two dated for three months and were married on January 4, 1947. Fletcher studied illustration under the wing of Walt Disney's teacher and role model, Carey Orr, for several years.

In 1953 he and his colleague Athena Robbins began producing their own weekly syndicated strip titled The Old Glory Story, which ran weekly in the Chicago Tribune and syndicated to hundreds of newspapers around the world until 1966. The Old Glory Story was based on the history of the American Flag and won many awards for the Tribune and for Fletcher and Robbins.

== Dick Tracy ==
In 1961, Chester Gould, creator of Dick Tracy and a colleague of Fletcher's on the Tribune, offered Fletcher a position as his assistant. When Gould retired in 1977, Fletcher took over the drawing of the strip. (Max Allan Collins took over the writing.) Fletcher continued to draw Dick Tracy until his death on March 16, 1983.
