= Chester Gould =

American cartoonist (1900–1985)

- Born: November 20, 1900; Pawnee, Oklahoma Territory, U.S.
- Died: May 11, 1985 (aged 84); Woodstock, Illinois, U.S.
- Education: Northwestern University
- Occupations: Cartoonist, writer
- Spouse: Edna M. Gauger (1901-1994)
- Children: Jean Gould O'Connell

Chester Gould (/ɡuːld/; November 20, 1900 – May 11, 1985) was an American cartoonist, best known as the creator of the Dick Tracy comic strip, which he wrote and drew from 1931 to 1977, incorporating numerous colorful and monstrous villains.

== Early life and education ==
Chester Gould was born to Gilbert R. Gould and Alice Maud (née Miller), in a log cabin outside Pawnee, Oklahoma. All four of his grandparents were pioneer settlers of Oklahoma. One grandfather was a minister, and Gould and his family were members of the United Brethren Church.

A cousin, Henry W. Gould, is Professor Emeritus of Mathematics at West Virginia University.

Gilbert Gould was an editor at the Pawnee Courier-Dispatch, which Chester would later credit for his becoming a cartoonist. When he was 8, a Supreme Court lawyer bought a drawing Gould had made when the lawyer was in town for a political event. Over the next few years he entered various contests and enrolled in a correspondence course in drawing. While still a senior in high school, he was discovered by the yearbook staff at Oklahoma A&M University and was hired to make line drawings for the 1918 and 1919 editions.

== Development ==
He enrolled at A&M himself in 1919 and drew editorial cartoons for the Tulsa Democrat and sports cartoons for The Daily Oklahoman. He was an early member of Lambda Chi Alpha, the oldest fraternity on campus, becoming the 44th initiate of its Stillwater chapter. In 1921 he transferred to Northwestern University, drawn to Chicago by the Chicago Tribune and its support for syndicated cartoon strips.

For the next ten years, Gould submitted many ideas for comic strips to Joseph Patterson, publisher of the Tribune, but none were accepted. To support himself, he drew ads and cartoons freelance for the Chicago Daily Journal. After graduation, he was hired by the Hearst-owned Chicago Evening American, and got his first comic strips into print: Fillum Fables, a spoof of silent films, and Radio Catts, featuring an anthropomorphic family of cats fascinated by the radio. The Hearst-owned King Features Syndicate syndicated both.

Gould met and married Edna Gauger in 1926, and their daughter was born the following year. In 1928, he joined the Chicago Daily News and launched his third comic strip, called The Girl Friends, while continuing to send ideas to Patterson. In June 1931, by Gould's account, he was listening to a radio series based on Sherlock Holmes stories and reading a newspaper account of Chicago's most powerful mobster, Al Capone; he was inspired to create a strip about a heroic detective fighting organized crime and corruption in the city. After rejecting 60 submissions from Gould, Patterson accepted his 61st.

== Dick Tracy ==
Proposed comic strip drawn by Chester Gould one year before creating Dick Tracy.

Gould was hired as a cartoonist with the Tribune and introduced Dick Tracy in the Detroit Mirror on Sunday, October 4, 1931. He drew the comic strip for the next 46 years from his home in Woodstock, Illinois.

In order to keep informed of police methods, Gould took courses in forensics and investigative procedures. He was later proud of having introduced the two-way wrist radio for Tracy in 1946, and in 1947, the closed-circuit television, both of which were later invented, though in somewhat different forms.

Gould's stories were rarely pre-planned, since he preferred to improvise stories as he drew them. While fans praised this approach as producing exciting stories, it sometimes created awkward plot developments that were difficult to resolve. In one notorious case, Gould had Tracy in an inescapable deathtrap with a caisson. When Gould depicted Tracy addressing Gould personally and having the cartoonist magically extract him, publisher Joseph Patterson vetoed the sequence and ordered it redrawn. The strip also drew protests from those who felt that Gould's depiction of crime was too gruesome, with Gould pouring on too much gore and carnage.

Later in the strip's Gould period, Dick Tracy was widely criticized for being too right-wing in character and as excessively supportive of the police. A handful of critics thought Gould ignored the rights of the accused and failed to support his agenda with an adequate storyline. The late 1950s also saw a newspaper readership growing less indulgent of Gould's politics.

For instance, Gould introduced a malodorous, tobacco-spitting character, B.O. Plenty, with little significant complaint from readers in the 1940s. However, the 1960s introduction of crooked lawyer Flyface and his relatives, surrounded by swarming flies, created a negative reader reaction strong enough for papers to drop the strip in large numbers. There was then a dramatic change in the strip's setting, leaving behind the strip's origins as an urban crime drama for science fiction plot elements and regular visits to the Moon. An increasingly fantastic procession of enemies and stories ensued. The Apollo 11 Moon landing prompted Gould to abandon this phase. Finally, Dick Tracy was beset by the overall trend in newspaper comics away from strips with continuing storylines and toward those whose stories are largely resolved within one series of panels.

Gould, his characters, and improbable plots were satirized in Al Capp's comic strip Li'l Abner with the Fearless Fosdick sequences (supposedly drawn by "Lester Gooch"); a notable villain was Bomb Face, a gangster whose head was a bomb.

Gould retired in 1977, with his last Dick Tracy strip appearing in print on Christmas Day, December 25. The strip continued with Gould's longtime assistant artist, Rick Fletcher, producing the artwork and Max Allan Collins as writer.

== Death ==
Gould died of congestive heart failure on May 11, 1985 at his home in Woodstock. He was 84 years old. Gould is buried in Oakland Cemetery in Woodstock.

== Awards and exhibitions ==
Chester Gould won the National Cartoonists Society's Reuben Award in 1959 and 1977, and was awarded the Inkpot Award in 1978. The Mystery Writers of America honored Gould and his work with a Special Edgar Award in 1980. In 1995, the strip was one of 20 included in the Comic Strip Classics series of commemorative postage stamps and postcards.

Dick Tracy: The Art of Chester Gould was an exhibition in Port Chester, New York, at the Museum of Cartoon Art from October 4 through November 30, 1978. The exhibition was curated by Bill Crouch, Jr.

From 1991 until 2008, the art and artifacts of Gould's career were displayed in the Chester Gould-Dick Tracy Museum that operated from the Woodstock, Illinois, Old Courthouse on the Square. Visitors to the Museum saw original comic strips, correspondence, photographs, and much memorabilia, including Gould's drawing board and chair. In 2000, the Museum received a Superior Achievement Award from the Illinois Association of Museums, and in 2001, it was given an Award of Excellence from the Illinois State Historical Society. The museum continues today as a virtual museum online.

In 2005, Gould was inducted into the Oklahoma Cartoonists Hall of Fame in Pauls Valley, Oklahoma, by Michael Vance. The Oklahoma Cartoonists Collection, created by Vance, is located in the Toy and Action Figure Museum.

A graduate of Northwestern University, Gould was honored with the naming of the Chester Gould Society for the School of Professional Studies donors.

== Books ==
In 1983, two years before Gould's death, his only child, Jean Gould O'Connell, recorded extensive interviews with her father, who spoke at length about his early attempts during the 1920s to get syndicated and the birth of Dick Tracy. These interviews became a major source when she wrote his biography, Chester Gould: A Daughter's Biography of the Creator of Dick Tracy, published by McFarland & Company in 2007.

The entire run of Dick Tracy was reprinted by IDW Publishing in a book series, The Complete Chester Gould's Dick Tracy. The series began in 2006. The first volume includes the five sample strips that Gould used to sell his strip, followed by over 450 strips showing the series' beginning (from October 1931 – May 1933), along with a Gould interview, never previously published, by Max Allan Collins. The last volume, Volume 29, ending with the strip for December 25, 1977, was published in 2020.
