= Casey, Crime Photographer =

Fictional character, crime photographer

- Created by: George Harmon Coxe
- Original work: Return Engagement, March 1934, Black Mask

Print publications
- Book(s): Books Cox, J. Randolph [2005], Flashgun Casey, Crime Photographer: From the Pulps to Radio And Beyond, David S. Siegel, William F. Nolan, Yorktown Heights, NY: Book Hunter Press. ISBN 1-891379-05-4; Coxe, George Harmon [1946], Flash Casey, Detective, J. Meyers : E.B. Williams :Avon Book Co.
- Novel(s): Novels Silent Are the Dead (1942); Murder For Two (1943); Error of Judgement (1961); The Man Who Died Too Soon (1962); Deadly Image (1964)
- Comics: Casey: Crime Photographer, Aug 1949, Marvel Comics Radio Tie in
- Magazine(s): Black Mask

Films and television
- Film(s): Women Are Trouble (1936); Here's Flash Casey (1938)
- Television series: Crime Photographer (1951–1952)

Theatrical presentations
- Play(s): Bristol, Stephen Crime Photographer

Audio
- Radio program(s): Casey, Crime Photographer (July 7, 1943 – November 16, 1950 and January 13, 1954 – April 22, 1955)

Casey, Crime Photographer (also known as Crime photographer; Flashgun Casey; Casey, Press Photographer; Stephen Bristol, Crime Photographer) was an American media franchise that lasted from the 1930s until the 1960s. Created by crime writer George Harmon Coxe, the photographer Casey was featured in radio, film, theater, novels, magazines and comic books, and television. Launched in a 1934 issue of the pulp magazine Black Mask, the character Jack "Flashgun" Casey, was a crime photographer for the newspaper The Morning Express. With the help of reporter Ann Williams (portrayed on radio and TV by Jan Miner), he solved crimes and recounted his stories to friends at The Blue Note, their favorite tavern.

== Black Mask ==
"Flashgun" Casey began in the March 1934 issue of Black Mask, in the story "Return Engagement". This story was later used in the film Here's Flash Casey. Twenty more stories appeared in the magazine over the next decades, and collections of these stories were published in anthology form as well. Two of the subsequent novels were serialized in the magazine, in addition to the 21 short stories.

In 1941, three parts of the novel Silent are the Dead were published in Black Mask in September, October and November as Killers Are Camera Shy. In 1943, Murder for Two was serialized in January, February and March as Blood on the Lens.

== Novels ==
Coxe wrote five novels featuring Casey.

- Deadly Image (1964)
- Error of Judgement (1961)
- The Man Who Died Too Soon (1962)
- Murder For Two (1943)

serialized in Black Mask over three issues.

- Silent Are the Dead (1942)

serialized in Black Mask over three issues.

Paul Ayres (Pseudonym of Edward S. Aaron) wrote a novel starring Casey, based on the works of Coxe

- Dead Heat (1950)

== Films ==
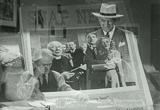
Here's Flash Casey

- Women Are Trouble (1936)
- Here's Flash Casey (1938)

== Radio ==
Begun as stories in Black Mask, the stories were brought to radio under multiple names. The series aired on CBS for its entirety. 07/07/43 – 11/16/50 and 01/13/54 – 04/22/55.

Selected cast

- Matt Crowley, Casey
- Staats Cotsworth, Casey
- Jan Miner, Ann Williams
- John Gibson, Ethelbert

Titles of show

- Flashgun Casey
- Casey, Crime Photographer
- Casey, Press Photographer
- Crime Photographer

The radio show was sustained by the network, sponsored by Anchor Hocking, Toni home permanents, Toni Shampoo and Philip Morris. The Blue Note was a jazz club; the Archie Bleyer Orchestra and first Herman Chittison and later The Teddy Wilson Trio were featured, usually in the introduction and wrap up of the show.

== Comic books ==
Marvel Comics predecessor Timely Comics published four issues of a comic book tie-in to the radio show. The series began in August 1949 and ended in February 1950. Art was provided by regular Timely artist Vernon Henkel.

== Television ==
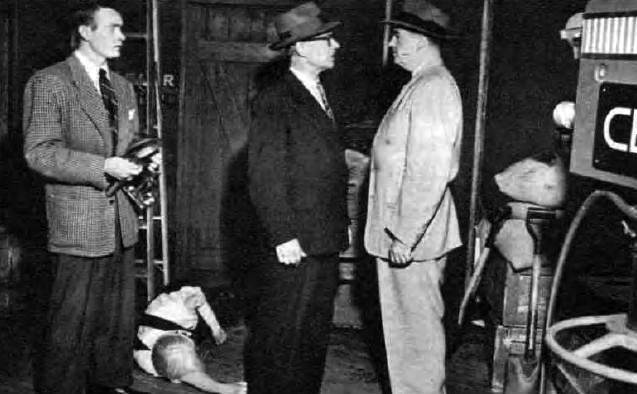
1951 photo from the television series (McGavin to left)

In 1951 the popular series moved to television

- First Telecast: April 19, 1951
- Last Telecast: June 5, 1952

Cast

- Jack "Flashgun" Casey (June 1951 – April 1952): Darren McGavin
- Ann Williams: Jan Miner (reprising her role on radio)

On Darren McGavin's website, he is quoted as saying "The cast of Crime Photographer didn’t go down fighting. "They took off for the hills. It was so bad that it was never re-run, and that’s saying something when you recall the caliber of television programs in those days."
