= Mark Trail (radio series) =

Mark Trail is the title of two different American radio series based on the popularity of the comic strip Mark Trail by Ed Dodd and airing around the same time period between 1950 and 1952. Just like the comic strip, they were adventure stories aimed at a young audience about forester and environmentalist Mark Trail.

== 1950–1951 series ==
Mark Trail
- Genre: Radio serial
- Running time: 30 minutes
- Country of origin: United States
- Language: English
- Home station: Mutual Broadcasting System
- Starring: Matt Crowley
- Announcer: Jackson Beck
- Original release: January 30, 1950 – June 8, 1951
- No. of episodes: 174
- Sponsored by: Kelloggs, Pep cereal brands

The first audio play series about Mark Trail aired on January 30, 1950 and lasted until June 8, 1951. It was broadcast on Mutual Broadcasting System. Each episode was 30 minutes long and aired three times a week, at 5 p.m. on Monday, Wednesday and Friday. The series was sponsored by Kellogg's Pep cereal.

A review of the first episode in the trade publication Variety said that the show's hero "combines the character of J. Edgar Hoover and Robin Hood." It commended Matt Crowley's performance in the title role.

== 1951–1952 series ==
Mark Trail
- Genre: Radio serial
- Running time: 30 minutes
- Country of origin: United States
- Language: English
- Home station: ABC Radio
- Starring: Staats Cotsworth
- Original release: September 18, 1950 – June 27, 1952
- No. of episodes: 125

On September 10, 1951, only three months after the first version, a second audio play series aired, this time on ABC Radio. Each episode was also a half-hour in length and ran thrice a week until January 1952. After this date it switched to a 15-minute format airing weekdays through June 27, 1952, namely Monday, Wednesday and Friday on 5:15 p.m. Only a handful of the 15-minute episodes are known to have survived.

== Cast ==
The series were directed by Drex Hines and Frank Maxwell. Scripts were written by Albert Aley, Gilbert Braun, Max Ehrlich, Elwood Hoffman, Donald Hughes and Palmer Thompson. The music was composed by John Gart, while the sound effects were provided by Bill Hoffman and Jack Keane. Announcements were provided by Jackson Beck and Glenn Riggs.

- Mark Trail: Matt Crowley, Staats Cotsworth, John Larkin
- Scotty: Ben Cooper, Ronald Liss
- Cherry: Joyce Gordon, Amy Sidell

== Announcement ==
Each episode would be announced with the following lines :

Battling the raging elements!

Fighting the savage wilderness!

Striking at the enemies of man and nature!

One man's name resounds from the snowcapped mountains down across the sun-baked plains: MAAAAARRRRRKKKKK TRAIL!

== Other radio adaptations of Mark Trail ==
From 1991 through September 2002 the Minneapolis-St. Paul, public radio station KFAI aired the series Mark Trail Radio Theatre. Each Friday evening a new weekly episode was aired. In total 228 weekly installments and 17 adventures in total were made.
