= The Mercenary (film) =

1968 film directed by Sergio Corbucci

- Directed by: Sergio Corbucci
- Screenplay by: Luciano Vincenzoni; Sergio Spina; Adriano Bolzoni; Sergio Corbucci
- Story by: Franco Solinas; Giorgio Arlorio
- Produced by: Alberto Grimaldi
- Starring: Franco Nero; Tony Musante; Jack Palance; Giovanna Ralli
- Cinematography: Alejandro Ulloa
- Edited by: Eugenio Alabiso
- Music by: Ennio Morricone; Bruno Nicolai
- Production companies: PEA; Produzioni Associate Delphos; Profilms 21
- Distributed by: United Artists
- Release date: 20 December 1968 (Italy)
- Countries: Italy; Spain
- Box office: ₤1.101 billion ITL (Italy)

The Mercenary (Italian: Il mercenario), known in the UK as A Professional Gun, is a 1968 Zapata Western film directed by Sergio Corbucci. The film stars: Franco Nero, Jack Palance, Tony Musante, Eduardo Fajardo and Giovanna Ralli, and features a musical score by Ennio Morricone, taking inspiration from his work in Guns for San Sebastian, and Bruno Nicolai.

== Plot ==
On the northern side of the Mexico–United States border, Sergei "Polack" Kowalski, a well-groomed, greedy mercenary, attends a circus performance where he recognizes the show's lead rodeo clown as Paco Roman. During the performance, Kowalski reminisces on how he and Paco fought together as revolutionaries against the Mexican Government.

Prior to the start of their partnership, Paco, a peon working in a silver mine owned by Elias Garcia, rebels against his boss and humiliates him and his two brothers, including Colonel Alfonso Garcia. He is soon captured, but saved from execution by his friends. Meanwhile, Kowalski makes a deal with Elias and his brother to take their silver safely across the border. Curly, Kowalski's flamboyant American rival, sees the three men talking and tracks down the brothers to find out what they hired Kowalski for, after which Curly kills the two.

When Kowalski arrives at the mine to meet the Garcias, he meets Paco and his revolutionaries instead. Colonel Garcia's troops arrive to attack them, and Kowalski agrees to help Paco fight them for money. With the help of Kowalski and his Hotchkiss M1914 machine gun, the revolutionaries drive Colonel Garcia's forces away. Kowalski then leaves, but he is soon ambushed by Curly. Paco's group arrives and kills Curly's men. Although Curly swears revenge, they let him go after stripping him of his clothes. Paco then hires Kowalski to teach him how to lead a revolution.

The revolutionaries travel from town to town robbing money, guns, and horses from the army. They also release a prisoner named Columba, who joins the group. Columba at first resents Paco's violent methods and his over-reliance on Kowalski, but both soon begin to respect each other. After Paco stays in one town to protect the people, despite Kowalski telling him that they cannot match the army sent to capture them, Kowalski leaves the group again. Paco's group admits defeat and returns to Kowalski. Kowalski doubles his fee, but he and Paco make another deal. After the revolutionaries take over a town by defeating a whole regiment, Paco, realizing the unfairness of the financial burden Kowalski has placed on him and Columba, imprisons Kowalski, confiscates his money, and marries Columba. When Colonel Garcia's army, along with Curly, attack them, Paco realizes he cannot manage the situation on his own and decides to set Kowalski free, but finds himself locked up while Kowalski escapes. Columba frees Paco, and the two escape before Curly can find them.

In the present, Kowalski notes that it has been six months since Paco betrayed him. After the performance ends, Curly and his men capture Paco. Kowalski shoots Curly's men and gives him and Paco both a rifle and a bullet, so that the two can have a fair duel. After Paco kills Curly, Kowalski takes him prisoner and heads to the headquarters of the 51st Regiment to collect the reward offered for his head. Columba, witnessing Kowalski's capture of her husband, rides to the 51st's headquarters with two members of Paco's troupe and meets with Colonel Garcia, pretending to betray Paco by telling him where the two are.

When the army troops find the pair, Kowalski also finds himself arrested as there is now an even bigger reward for his head. The two are then sentenced to death by firing squad. However, Columba executes her plan, and holds Garcia at gunpoint while the circus performers create a diversion. Using two machine guns, Paco and Kowalski kill most of Garcia's troops, and they escape with Columba and the performers. The group splits up; Columba and the performers leave to spread the word of Paco's return to Mexico, Paco prepares to lie low before reuniting with Columba, and Kowalski, who has been given a share of his own reward money, prepares to leave Mexico. Kowalski suggests to Paco that they should team up as a mercenary pair, but Paco assures him that his "dream" is in Mexico. As the two friends part ways, Colonel Garcia and four soldiers prepare to ambush and kill Paco. Kowalski cuts them all down with his rifle from a nearby hillside. Before leaving, he yells: "Good luck, Paco! Keep dreaming, but with your eyes open!"

== Cast ==
- Franco Nero as Sergei "Polack" Kowalski
- Tony Musante as Paco Román
- Jack Palance as Ricciolo (Curly)
- Giovanna Ralli as Columba
- Eduardo Fajardo as Alfonso García
- Franco Giacobini as Pepote
- Álvaro de Luna as Ramón
- Raf Baldassarre as Mateo
- Joe Kamel as Sebastián
- Franco Ressel as Studs
- Ugo Adinolfi
- José María Aguinaco as Ramírez
- Simón Arriaga as Simón
- José Canalejas as Lerkin
- Juan Cazalilla as Mayor
- Remo De Angelis as Hudo
- Alejandro de Enciso as Juan
- Tito García as García's Cousin
- Joyce Gordon as Columba (voice)
- Bernie Grant as García's Brother (voice)
- A. Jiménez Castellanos
- Guillermo Méndez as Captain
- Enrique Navarro as Notary
- Francisco Nieto as Antonio
- Ángel Ortiz as Mexican #3
- Julio Peña
- Milo Quesada as Marco
- Herman Reynoso as Curly's 2nd Man
- José Riesgo as García's Brother
- Lorenzo Robledo as Officer
- Vicente Roca as Elías García
- Fernando Villena as Sergeant
- José I. Zaldua as Innkeeper
- Ángel Álvarez as Notary

== Production ==
In 1968, Franco Solinas and Giorgio Arlorio wrote The Mercenary. Initially, the film was going to be directed by Gillo Pontecorvo.

== Release ==
The Mercenary was released in December 1968. The film was released in the United Kingdom in 1970 as A Professional Gun and in the United States as The Mercenary.

== Reception ==
On the review aggregator website Rotten Tomatoes, 80% of 5 critics' reviews are positive, with an average rating of 8/10.
