= Lamar Dodd =

American painter (1909–1996)

- Born: William Lamar Dodd; September 22, 1909; Fairburn, Georgia, U.S.
- Died: September 21, 1996 (aged 86)
- Education: Georgia Institute of Technology
- Occupations: Painter, educator
- Relatives: Ed Dodd (cousin)

Lamar Dodd (né William Lamar Dodd; September 22, 1909 – September 21, 1996) was an American painter, and educator. His artwork reflected a love of the American South. He is the namesake of Lamar Dodd School of Art at the University of Georgia.

== Early life and education ==
William Lamar Dodd was born on September 22, 1909, in Fairburn, Georgia, to Etta Cleveland, and Rev. Francis Jefferson Dodd. He was reared in LaGrange, Georgia. In the 6th grade he took art classes at LaGrange Female College (now LaGrange College).

Ed Dodd, creator of the Mark Trail comic strip, was his first cousin.

He attended the School of Architecture at the Georgia Institute of Technology (now Georgia Tech) for one year. He taught art in Alabama, before traveling to New York City to study under advocates of the Ashcan School of painting as well as to gain a nativist perspective from the paintings of artists such as Thomas Hart Benton. He specifically studied under the draughtsman George Bridgman and the painter George Luks.

== Career ==
He returned to Birmingham, Alabama, determined to champion local art. Over a long and productive career his styles encompassed naturalism and expressionism and extended to abstract art.

Dodd was also a university teacher and administrator. Appointed as an artist in residence at the University of Georgia, in Athens, in 1937, he became the head of the art department several years later. Dodd consolidated art instruction into a unified department and initiated a master's degree program. The Lamar Dodd School of Art at the University of Georgia is named in his memory. Dodd became a full member of the National Academy of Design in 1954, and was a member of the Sigma Chi fraternity. In 1958 his painting Cathedral Number 1 was acquired for the collection at Lehigh University by prominent alumnus Ralf Wilson after it was shown in a contemporary art exhibition curated by Francis J. Quirk.
