= Casey, Crime Photographer (radio series) =

- Other names: Flashgun Casey, Casey-Press Photographer, Crime Photographer
- Genre: Mono
- Running time: 30 minutes
- Country of origin: United States
- Language: English
- Syndicates: CBS
- TV adaptations: Crime Photographer
- Starring: Matt Crowley; Jim Backus, Jan Miner, John Gibson
- Announcer: Bob Hite; Tony Marvin; Bill Cullen
- Created by: George Harmon Coxe (stories)
- Written by: Alonzo Deen Cole
- Directed by: Albert Ward, Rocco Tito, and John Dietz
- Produced by: Chester Ranier and John Dietz
- Original release: 07/07/43 – 04/22/55
- No. of series: 5
- Audio format: Mono
- Sponsored by: Anchor Hocking; Toni Home Permanents; Philip Morris
- Podcast: Stream episodes from Archive.org

Casey, Crime Photographer, known by a variety of titles on radio (a.k.a. Crime Photographer, Flashgun Casey, Casey, Press Photographer) was a media franchise from the 1930s to the 1960s. The character was the creation of novelist George Harmon Coxe. Casey was featured in the pulp magazine, Black Mask, novels, comic books, radio, film, television and theatre.

Jack "Flashgun" Casey, was a crime photographer for the newspaper The Morning Express. With the help of reporter Ann Williams, he solved crimes and recounted his stories to Ethelbert the bartender (portrayed by John Gibson) and other friends at the Blue Note Cafe, their favorite tavern and jazz club where the Archie Bleyer Orchestra and the Teddy Wilson Trio were featured. The role of Ann Williams was portrayed throughout most of the run of the series (as well as in the television version) by Jan Miner, perhaps best remembered as "Madge" the manicurist on Palmolive's television soap commercials from the 1960s and 1970s.

== Radio ==
Begun as over 20 popular short stories in Black Mask, there were films and novels before the stories were brought to radio under various names. The series aired on CBS. The radio show was sustained by the network when a sponsor could not be found. Sponsors of the show include Anchor Hocking, Toni home permanents, Toni Shampoo and Philip Morris. Anchor Hocking's sponsorship ended with the March 25, 1948, episode.

=== Cast ===
- Matt Crowley, Casey
- Jim Backus, Casey (briefly)
- Staats Cotsworth, Casey
- Jan Miner, Ann Williams
- Lesley Woods, Ann Williams
- John Gibson, Ethelbert the bartender
- Bernard Lenrow, Captain Logan
- Tony Marvin, announcer

=== Air dates ===
- 07/07/43 – 04/01/44 (as Flashgun Casey)
- 04/08/44 – 06/26/45 (as Casey, Press Photographer)
- 07/11/45 – 03/13/47 (as Crime Photographer)
- 03/20/47 – 11/16/50 (as Casey, Crime Photographer)
- 01/13/54 – 04/22/55 (as Crime Photographer)

In the period between the fourth and fifth series, the live television version was telecast.

== Other media ==
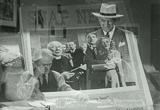
Here's Flash Casey (1938)

"Flashgun" Casey was featured in 21 short stories in Black Mask, a popular pulp magazine of the time. Collections of these stories were published in anthology form as well. Coxe wrote five novels featuring Casey from the 1930s to the 1960s. Two films Women Are Trouble and Here's Flash Casey were produced in the 1930s. Timely Comics published four issues of a comic book tie-in to the radio show in 1949, with art by Vernon Henkel.

== Television ==
In 1951 the popular series moved to television:

- First Telecast: April 19, 1951
- Last Telecast: June 5, 1952
- Casey (April–June 1951): Richard Carlyle
- Casey (June 1951 – April 1952): Darren McGavin
- Ann Williams: Jan Miner (reprising her radio role)

McGavin commented, "The cast of Crime Photographer didn’t go down fighting. They took off for the hills. It was so bad that it was never re-run, and that's saying something when you recall the caliber of television programs in those days."
