= List of novels by George Harmon Coxe =

George Harmon Coxe wrote a total of 63 novels starting in 1935, the last being published in 1975.

Novels by Coxe
Title	Year
Murder with Pictures	1935
The Barotique Mystery	1936
The Camera Clue	1937
Four Frightened Women	1939
Murder for the Asking	1939
The Glass Triangle	1940
The Lady is Afraid	1940
No Time to Kill	1941
Mrs. Murdock Takes a Case	1941
Silent are the Dead	1942
Assignment in Guiana	1942
The Charred Witness	1942
Murder in Havana	1943
Alias the Dead	1943
Murder for Two	1943
The Groom Lay Dead	1944
The Jade Venus	1945
Woman at Bay	1945
Dangerous Legacy	1946
The Fifth Key	1947
Fashioned for Murder	1947
Venturous Lady	1948
The Hollow Needle	1948
The Lady Killer	1949
Inland Passage	1949
Eye Witness	1950
The Frightened Fiancee	1950
The Widow Had a Gun	1951
The Man Who Died Twice	1951
Never Bet Your Life	1952
The Crimson Clue	1953
Uninvited Guest	1953
Death at the Isthmus	1954
Focus on Murder	1956
Top Assignment	1957
Suddenly a Widow	1957
Man on a Rope	1956
Murder on Their Minds	1958
One Minute Past Eight	1959
The Impetuous Mistress	1959
The Big Gamble	1960
Slack Tide	1960
The Last Commandment	1960
One Way Out	1961
Error of Judgement	1962
Moment of Violence	1962
The Man Who Died too Soon	1963
Mission of Fear	1963
The Hidden Key	1964
One Hour to Kill	1964
Deadly Image	1964
With Intent to Kill	1965
The Reluctant Heiress	1965
The Ring of Truth	1966
The Candid Imposter	1968
An Easy Way to Go	1969
Double Identity	1970
Fenner	1971
Woman with a Gun	1972
The Silent Witness	1973
The Inside Man	1974
No Place for Murder	1975
