= Donald McClelland =

American actor

- Born: September 29, 1903; New York City, U.S.
- Died: November 15, 1955 (aged 52); New York City, U.S.
- Other names: Donald C. McClelland
- Occupation(s): Actor, child actor
- Years active: 1915–1955

Donald McClelland (September 29, 1903 – November 15, 1955), who was also known as Donald C. McClelland in certain stage performances, was an American actor, stage performer and a former child actor.

== Career ==
=== Stage ===
McClelland began his career as a stage performer at the age of 12. His first Broadway play was a stage adaptation of the classic tale of Peter Pan in 1915. This was the start of an enduring career in Broadway and on stage. The next play McClelland appeared was the play A Night at Avignon. The play was performed in 1919.

Some of McClelland's other plays he performed in include Sylvia, Back Here, Scarlet Pages, Lady Beyond the Moon, The Mask and the Face, Ah, Wilderness!, To My Husband, The Night Before Christmas, Yankee Point, Make Yourself at Home, State of the Union, Miss Liberty, Our West of Eighth, and Mid-Summer.

McClelland made his last stage appearance with the play Anniversary Waltz. The play opened on April 7, 1954, at the Broadhurst Theatre and closed at the Booth Theatre on September 24, 1955. The play gave a total of 611 performances.

=== Film ===
Two years later, McClelland, who was 14 at the time, appeared in his first film continuing his career as a child actor.

The film was entitled Knights of the Square Table. The film was a silent drama released on July 23, 1917. McClelland played the minor role of Billy in the film.

McClelland also did a short film entitled Mother Takes a Holiday in 1952. He played the role of Charlie Danning in the short.

=== Television ===
McClelland made his first television appearance in 1950 on the anthology series Armstrong Circle Theatre. Some of his other television appearances include Robert Montgomery Presents, Studio One, Lux Video Theatre, and The Philco Television Playhouse.

McClelland co-starred with Darren McGavin and Jan Miner on the television series Casey, Crime Photographer. The series aired on CBS from 1951 to 1952. McClelland played the role of Captain Logan on the show.

== Personal life ==
McClelland was married once but was divorced in 1930.

== Death ==
McClelland died on November 15, 1955, in New York City.

== Filmography ==
Year	Title	Role	Notes
1917	Knights of the Square Table	Billy	
1950	Armstrong Circle Theatre		1 episode
1951	Robert Montgomery Presents		1 episode
1951	Studio One		1 episode
1951-1952	Casey, Crime Photographer	Captain Logan	Appeared in all 57 episodes
1951-1952	Tales of Tomorrow	Congressman Folmer	2 episodes
1952	Mother Takes a Holiday	Charlie Danning	Short film
1953	Lux Video Theatre	Mr. Jankins	1 episode
1954	The Philco Television Playhouse		1 episode

== Stage work ==
- Peter Pan (1915)
- A Night at Avignon (1919)
- Sylvia (1923)
- White Collars (1925)
- Fast Life (1928)
- Back Here (1928)
- Scarlet Pages (1929)
- Lady Beyond the Moon (1931)
- The Mask and the Face (1933)
- Ah, Wilderness! (1933)
- Too Many Boats (1934)
- To My Husband (1936)
- The Night Before Christmas (1941)
- Yankee Point (1942)
- Make Yourself at Home (1945)
- State of the Union (1945)
- Light Up the Sky (1948)
- Miss Liberty (1949)
- The Small Hours (1951)
- Our West of Eighth (1951)
- Hook n' Ladder (1952)
- Mid-Summer (1953)
- Anniversary Waltz (1954)
