= Once Upon a Time in the West =

1968 film by Sergio Leone

- Theatrical release poster by Frank McCarthy
- Italian: C'era una volta il West
- Directed by: Sergio Leone
- Screenplay by: Sergio Donati; Sergio Leone
- Story by: Dario Argento; Bernardo Bertolucci; Sergio Leone
- Produced by: Fulvio Morsella
- Starring: Claudia Cardinale; Henry Fonda; Jason Robards; Charles Bronson; Gabriele Ferzetti; Woody Strode; Jack Elam; Lionel Stander; Paolo Stoppa; Frank Wolff; Keenan Wynn
- Cinematography: Tonino Delli Colli
- Edited by: Nino Baragli
- Music by: Ennio Morricone
- Production companies: Euro International Films; Paramount Pictures; Rafran Cinematografica; Finanzia San Marco
- Distributed by: Euro International Films (Italy); Paramount Pictures (United States)
- Release dates: December 20, 1968 (Rome); December 21, 1968 (Italy); May 28, 1969 (New York)
- Running time: 171 minutes (Italian version); 165 minutes (international version); 140 minutes (American theatrical version)
- Countries: Italy; United States
- Languages: Italian; English
- Budget: $5 million
- Box office: $5.3 million (United States); 40 million tickets (worldwide)

Once Upon a Time in the West (Italian: C'era una volta il West) is a 1968 epic spaghetti Western film directed by Sergio Leone from a screenplay he co-wrote with Sergio Donati. It stars Claudia Cardinale, Henry Fonda, Jason Robards, Charles Bronson, Gabriele Ferzetti, Woody Strode, Jack Elam, Lionel Stander, Paolo Stoppa, Frank Wolff, and Keenan Wynn. The widescreen cinematography was by Tonino Delli Colli and the film score was composed and conducted by Ennio Morricone.

After directing The Good, the Bad and the Ugly, Leone decided to retire from Westerns and aimed to produce his film based on the novel The Hoods, which eventually became Once Upon a Time in America. However, Leone accepted an offer from Paramount Pictures providing Henry Fonda and a budget to produce another Western. He recruited Dario Argento and Bernardo Bertolucci to devise the plot, researching other Westerns in the process. After Clint Eastwood turned down an offer to play the protagonist, Bronson was offered the role. During production, Leone recruited Donati to rewrite the script due to concerns over time limitations. The film is the first installment in Leone's Once Upon a Time trilogy, followed by Duck, You Sucker! and Once Upon a Time in America, though the films do not share any characters.

The original version by the director was 165 minutes when it was first released on December 21, 1968. This version was shown in European cinemas, and was a box-office success. For the U.S. release on May 28, 1969, it was edited down to 140 minutes by Paramount and was a financial flop.

In 2009, the film was selected for preservation in the US National Film Registry by the Library of Congress as being "culturally, historically, or aesthetically significant". The film is regarded as one of the greatest Westerns and one of the greatest films in history.

== Plot ==
A train arrives at the Old West town of Flagstone where a man with a harmonica (later dubbed "Harmonica") kills three men attempting to ambush him. Although Harmonica was expecting an outlaw named Frank, he concludes the men belonged to the outlaw Cheyenne's gang. Meanwhile, Frank and his gang massacre Brett McBain and his three children as they prepare for a celebration at his ranch Sweetwater. Shortly after, a former prostitute arrives at Sweetwater and reveals she is Jill McBain, who had married McBain a month earlier in New Orleans. Frank leaves evidence at the murder scene implicating Cheyenne. Jill searches for a motive behind the murders.

Railway tycoon Morton hired Frank to intimidate, not murder, McBain. McBain intended to profit by building a watering station on Sweetwater, knowing that the railroad from Flagstone would pass through his property. However, if the station was incomplete by the time the railroad reached Sweetwater, the property would revert to the railroad. McBain's murder puts Morton at odds with Frank, who desires the land for himself. Jill, as McBain's surviving widow, now owns Sweetwater.

Harmonica encounters Cheyenne, now a fugitive, who denies his men tried to ambush him. Harmonica saves Jill from two of Frank's men and spies out the railway carriage where Morton (owing to his spinal tuberculosis) is confined on crutches. Harmonica discovers the connection between Frank and Morton but is captured. Frank is called away and Cheyenne rescues Harmonica. The two collaborate to help Jill save Sweetwater, using stockpiled materials to start building a station.

After a threatening sexual encounter with Frank, Jill is forced to auction the land; however, Frank's henchmen intimidate bidders so Frank can buy it at a low price. Harmonica appears with Cheyenne in tow and bids $5,000, which is the bounty on Cheyenne as a wanted fugitive. Frank is unsuccessful in buying Harmonica out, and wonders why Harmonica is pursuing him. Morton bribes Frank's own men to kill him, but Harmonica intervenes to save Frank, due to having unfinished business with him.

Cheyenne escapes custody, and he and his gang engage Frank's remaining men in a gunfight on Morton's train. Except for Cheyenne, who heads to Sweetwater, everyone is killed, including Morton. Upon seeing the aftermath of the fight, Frank rides to Sweetwater, where Harmonica is waiting. Cheyenne arrived earlier, but remains inside the ranch house with Jill. Outside, Harmonica and Frank engage in a showdown. Through a flashback, it is revealed that Frank had once prepared to hang a man, forcing his younger brother to support him on his shoulders while playing a harmonica. Eventually, the boy collapsed, dooming his brother. Now Harmonica, the boy grown up, beats Frank to the draw and, as Frank lies dying, he pushes the harmonica into Frank's mouth.

After Harmonica and Cheyenne leave Sweetwater together, Cheyenne collapses and dies from a gunshot wound he received during the fight with Morton. Harmonica puts Cheyenne's body on his horse and rides off as Jill serves water to railroad workers.

== Cast ==
- Claudia Cardinale as Jill McBain
- Henry Fonda as Frank
- Jason Robards as Manuel "Cheyenne" Gutiérrez
- Charles Bronson as "Harmonica"
- Gabriele Ferzetti as Mr. Morton
- Paolo Stoppa as Sam, the Coachman
- Keenan Wynn as the Sheriff of Flagstone
- Frank Wolff as Brett McBain
- Lionel Stander as the barman
- Woody Strode as Stony, first gunman
- Jack Elam as Snaky, second gunman

In addition to the credited cast, uncredited actors in the film include Enzo Santaniello (Timmy), Simonetta Santaniello (Maureen), and Stefano Imparato (Patrick) as the McBain children; Al Mulock as the third station gunman Knuckles; Conrado San Martín as Vecino, Marco Zuanelli as Wobbles, and Claudio Mancini as Harmonica's brother.

Uncredited actors playing members of Cheyenne's gang include Aldo Sambrell, Lorenzo Robledo, and Bruno Corazzari. Members of Frank's gang include Benito Stefanelli, Román Ariznavarreta, Frank Braña, Antonio Molino Rojo, and Fabio Testi.

== Production ==
=== Origins ===
After making his American gunfighter epic The Good, the Bad and the Ugly, Leone had intended to make no more Westerns, believing he had said all he wanted to say. He had come across the novel The Hoods by the pseudonymous "Harry Grey", a fictionalized book based on the author's own experiences as a Jewish hood during Prohibition, and planned to adapt it into a film (17 years later, it would become his final film, Once Upon a Time in America). Leone, though, was offered only Westerns by the Hollywood studios. United Artists (which had produced the Dollars Trilogy) offered him the opportunity to make a film starring Charlton Heston, Kirk Douglas and Rock Hudson, but Leone refused. When Paramount offered Leone a generous budget along with access to Henry Fonda—his favorite actor, and one with whom he had wanted to work for virtually all of his career—Leone accepted the offer.

Leone commissioned Bernardo Bertolucci and Dario Argento to help him devise a film treatment in late 1966. The men spent much of the following year watching and discussing numerous classic Westerns, such as High Noon, The Iron Horse, The Comancheros and The Searchers at Leone's house, and constructed a story made up almost entirely of references to American Westerns.

=== Style and pacing ===
For Once Upon a Time in the West, Leone changed his approach over his earlier Westerns. Whereas the "Dollars" films were quirky and up-tempo, a celebratory yet tongue-in-cheek parody of the icons of the Wild West, this film is much slower in pace and somber in theme. Leone's distinctive style, which is very different from, but very much influenced by, Akira Kurosawa's Sanshiro Sugata (1943), is still present, but has been modified for the beginning of Leone's second trilogy, the so-called Once Upon a Time trilogy. The characters in this film are also beginning to change markedly over their predecessors in the Dollars trilogy. They are not quite as defined and, unusually for Leone characters up to this point, they begin to change (or at least attempt to) over the course of the story. This signals the start of the second phase of Leone's style, which was further developed in Duck, You Sucker! and Once Upon a Time in America.

The film features long, slow scenes with very little dialogue and little happening, broken by brief and sudden violence. Leone was far more interested in the rituals preceding violence than in the violence itself. The tone of the film is consistent with the arid semidesert in which the story unfolds, and imbues it with a feeling of realism that contrasts with the elaborately choreographed gunplay.

Leone liked to tell the story of a cinema in Paris where the film ran uninterrupted for two years. When he visited this theater, he was surrounded by fans who wanted his autograph, as well as the projectionist, who was less than enthusiastic. Leone claimed the projectionist told him, "I kill you! The same movie over and over again for two years! And it's so SLOW!"

=== Locations ===
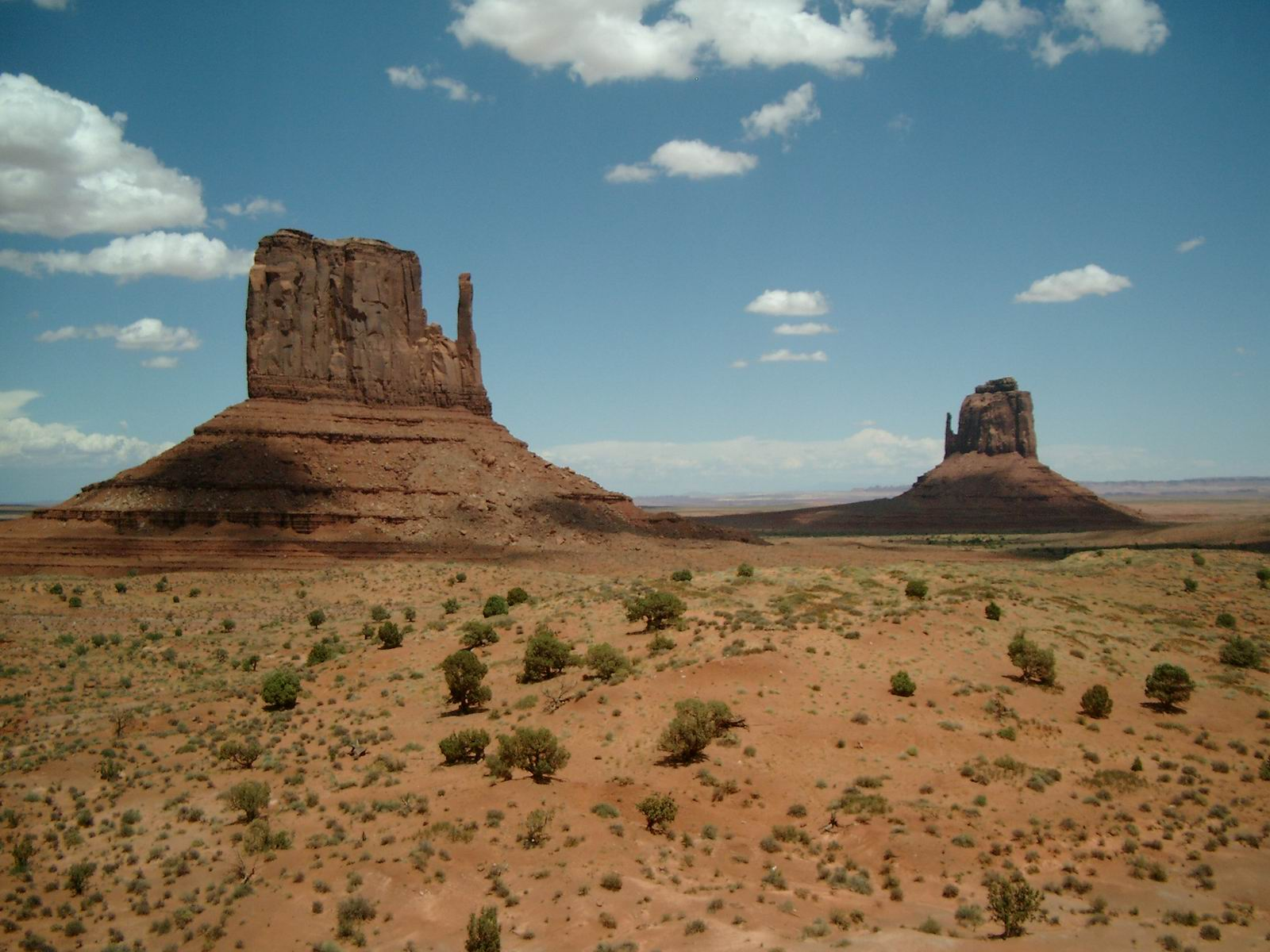
Monument Valley, Utah

Interiors for the film were shot in Cinecittà studios, Rome. The opening sequence with the three gunmen meeting the train was one of the sequences filmed in Spain. Shooting for scenes at Cattle Corner Station, as the location was called in the story, was scheduled for four days and was filmed at the "ghost" railway station in the municipality of La Calahorra, near Guadix, in the Province of Granada, Spain, as were the scenes of Flagstone. Shooting for the scenes in the middle of the railway were filmed along the Guadix–Hernán-Valle railway line. Scenes at the Sweetwater Ranch were filmed in the Tabernas Desert, Spain; the ranch is still located at what is now called Western Leone. The brick arch, where Bronson's character flashes back to his youth and the original hanging incident, was built near a small airport 15 miles (24 km) north of Monument Valley, in Utah, and two miles from U.S. Route 163 (which links Gouldings Lodge and Mexican Hat). Monument Valley itself is used extensively for the route Jill travels towards her new family in Sweetwater.

=== Casting ===
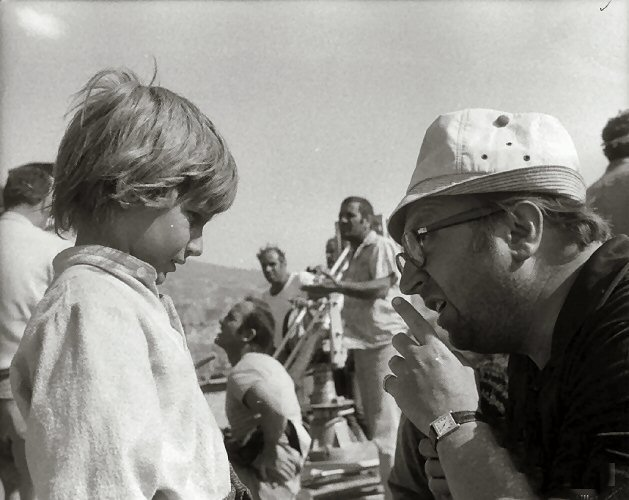
Director Sergio Leone (right) and Enzo Santaniello on the set of the film

Henry Fonda did not accept Leone's first offer to play Frank, so Leone flew to New York to convince him, telling him: "Picture this: the camera shows a gunman from the waist down pulling his gun and shooting a running child. The camera tilts up to the gunman's face and... it's Henry Fonda". Fonda also had not seen any of Leone's previous work including his Dollars Trilogy with Clint Eastwood so Leone arranged a screening of the trilogy for the actor. After the screening and a meeting with Leone, Fonda called his friend Eli Wallach, who had co-starred in The Good, the Bad and the Ugly. Wallach advised Fonda to do the film, telling him "You will have the time of your life."

When he accepted the role, Fonda came to the set with brown contact lenses and a handlebar mustache. Fonda felt having dark eyes and facial hair would blend well with his character's evil, and also help the audience to accept this "new" Fonda as the bad guy, but Leone immediately told him to remove the contacts and facial hair, saying he did not want Fonda to look like a cliche villain.

Leone said he cast Claudia Cardinale in part because she was an Italian national and, as such, they could get a tax break.

Leone wanted the three men who ambush Harmonica and are subsequently killed to be played by Clint Eastwood, Lee Van Cleef, and Eli Wallach in a symbolic killing of the Dollars Trilogy which Leone wanted to put behind him. However, though Wallach was willing, Van Cleef was unavailable and Eastwood was not interested in the role.

French actor-filmmaker Robert Hossein was set to play a supporting role as a member of Frank's gang, and is listed in the cast by some sources (including the AFI Catalog of Feature Films). However, Hossein stated in a 2015 featurette for his film Cemetery Without Crosses that he did not actually appear in the film.

=== Localization ===
Following the film's completion, Once Upon a Time in the West was dubbed into several languages, including Italian, French, German, Spanish, and English. The film's dialogue was translated into English by expatriate American actor Mickey Knox. For the English dub, the voices of many of the American cast, including Fonda, Bronson, Robards, Wynn, Wolff, and Lionel Stander, were used. However, the rest of the cast had to be dubbed by other actors – including Claudia Cardinale, who was dubbed by actress Joyce Gordon, Gabriele Ferzetti, who was voiced by Gordon's husband, Bernard Grant, and Jack Elam.

== Music ==
The music was written by composer Ennio Morricone, Leone's regular collaborator, who wrote the score under Leone's direction before filming began. As in The Good, the Bad and the Ugly, the haunting music contributes to the film's grandeur and, like the music for The Good, the Bad and the Ugly, is considered one of Morricone's greatest compositions.

The film features leitmotifs that relate to each of the main characters (with their own theme music), as well as to the spirit of the American West. Especially compelling are the wordless vocals by Italian singer Edda Dell'Orso during the theme music for Jill McBain. Leone's desire was to have the music available and played during filming. Leone had Morricone compose the score before shooting started and played the music in the background for the actors on set.

Except for about a minute of the "Judgment" motif, before Harmonica kills the three outlaws, no soundtrack music is played until the end of the second scene, when Fonda makes his first entry. During the beginning of the film, Leone instead uses natural sounds, for instance, a turning wheel in the wind, sound of a train, cicadas, shotguns while hunting, wings of pigeons, etc., in addition to the diegetic sound of the harmonica.

== Release ==
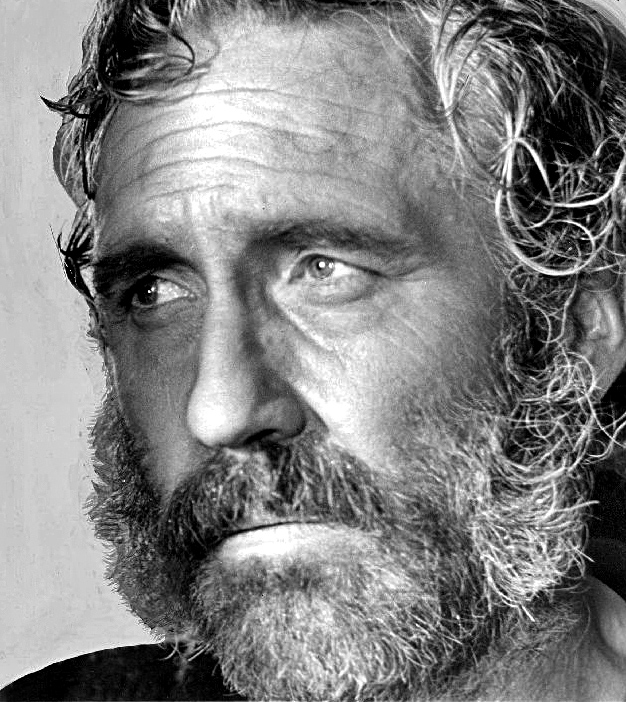
Jason Robards, one of the principal actors in the film.

=== European release ===
The film was a massive hit in France, and was easily the most successful film released there in 1969, with 14.8 million admissions, ranking seventh of all time. It sparked a brief fashion trend for duster coats, which took such proportions that Parisian department stores such as Au Printemps had to affix signs on escalators warning patrons to keep their "maxis", as they were called, clear from the edges of moving steps to prevent jamming.

It was also the most popular film in Germany with admissions of 13 million, ranking third of all time.

=== American release ===
In the US, Paramount edited the film to about 145 minutes for the wide release, but the film underperformed at the box office, earning $2.1 million in North America.

These scenes were cut for the American release:

- The entire scene at Lionel Stander's trading post. Cheyenne (Robards) was not introduced in the American release until his arrival at the McBain ranch later in the film. Stander remained in the credits, though he did not appear in this version at all.
- The scene in which Morton and Frank discuss what to do with Jill at the Navajo Cliffs.
- Morton's death scene was reduced considerably.
- Cheyenne's death scene was completely excised.

Otherwise, one scene was slightly longer in the US version than in the international film release: following the opening duel (where all four gunmen fire and fall), Charles Bronson's character stands up again, showing that he had only been shot in the shoulder. This part of the scene had been originally cut by director Sergio Leone for the worldwide theatrical release. It was added again for the U.S. market, because the American distributors feared American viewers would not understand the story otherwise, especially since Harmonica's shoulder wound is originally shown for the first time in the scene at the trading post, which was cut for the shorter U.S. version.

The English-language version was restored to around 165 minutes for a re-release in 1984, and for its video release the following year.

=== Director's cut ===
In Italy, a 171-minute director's cut features a yellow tint filter, and several scenes were augmented with additional material. This director's cut was available on home video until the early 2000s, and still airs on TV, but more recent home-video releases have used the international cut.

=== Home media ===
After years of public requests, Paramount released a two-disc "Special Collector's Edition" of Once Upon a Time in the West on November 18, 2003, with a running time of 165 minutes (158 minutes in some regions). (Note: The 7-minute regional variation in DVD running time is due to the 4% speed difference between the 24 fps NTSC and 25 fps PAL video formats. No content differs.) This release is the color 2.35:1 aspect ratio version in anamorphic widescreen, closed captioned, and Dolby. Commentary is also provided by film experts and historians, including John Carpenter, John Milius, Alex Cox, film historian and Leone biographer Sir Christopher Frayling, Dr. Sheldon Hall, and actors Claudia Cardinale and Gabriele Ferzetti, and director Bernardo Bertolucci, a co-writer of the film.

The second disc has special features, including three recent documentaries on several aspects of the film:

- An Opera of Violence
- The Wages of Sin
- Something to Do with Death

The film was released on Blu-ray on May 31, 2011, with a limited edition 4K UHD Blu-ray released as part of the Paramount Presents series (#44) on May 14, 2024. A standard issue 4K UHD was released on January 15, 2025.

=== Restored version ===
A restored 4K version was published by Cineteca di Bologna in 2018, with improved colors and image quality.

== Reception ==
=== Box office ===
In Italy, the film sold 8,870,732 tickets. In the United States, it grossed $5,321,508, from 3.7 million ticket sales. It sold a further 14,873,804 admissions in France and 13,018,414 admissions in Germany, for a total of 40,462,950 tickets sold worldwide.

=== Critical response ===
Once Upon a Time in the West was reviewed in 1969 in the Chicago Sun-Times by Roger Ebert, who gave it two and a half stars out of four. He found the film "good fun" and "a painstaking distillation" of Leone's famous style, with intriguing performances by actors cast against their type and a richness of detail projecting "a sense of life of the West" made possible by Paramount's larger budget for this Leone film. Ebert complained of the film's length and convoluted plot, which he said only becomes clear by the second hour. While viewing Cardinale as a good casting choice, he said she lacked the "blood-and-thunder abandon" of her performance in Cartouche (1962), blaming Leone for directing her "too passively". Ebert eventually warmed up to the film, calling it "an unquestioned masterpiece" in his "Great Movies" review of The Good, the Bad and the Ugly.

In subsequent years, the film developed a greater standing among critics, as well as a cult following. Directors such as Martin Scorsese, George Lucas, Quentin Tarantino, and Vince Gilligan have cited the film as an influence on their work. It has also appeared on prominent all-time critics lists, including Time's 100 greatest films of the 20th century and Empire's 500 greatest movies of all time, where it was the list's highest-ranking Western at number 14. Paul Schrader toasted it as "one of the greatest films ever made".

On review aggregation website Rotten Tomatoes it has a 96% approval rating based on 68 reviews, with an average score of 9.1/10. The critical consensus reads: "A landmark Sergio Leone spaghetti Western masterpiece featuring a classic Morricone score". Metacritic gives the film a weighted average score of 82 out of 100 based on reviews from 9 critics, indicating "universal acclaim".

=== Accolades ===
- Time named Once Upon a Time in the West as one of the 100 greatest films of all time.
- Total Film placed Once Upon a Time in the West in their special edition issue of the 100 Greatest Movies.
- In 2008, Empire held a poll of "the 500 Greatest Movies of All Time", taking votes from 10,000 readers, 150 filmmakers, and 50 film critics. "Once Upon a Time in the West" was voted in at number 14, the highest Western on the list. In 2017, it was then ranked at number 52 on Empire's poll for "The 100 Greatest Movies" (the second-highest Western on the list).
- In 2009, the film was selected for preservation in the United States National Film Registry by the Library of Congress as being "culturally, historically or aesthetically significant".
- In 2010, The Guardian ranked it third in its "The 25 Best Action and War Films of All Time" list; and in 2013 the paper ranked it first in its "Top 10 Movie Westerns" list.
- In the 2012 Sight & Sound polls, it was ranked the 78th-greatest film ever made in the critics' poll and 44th in the directors' poll.
- In 2014, Time Out polled several film critics, directors, actors, and stunt actors to list their top action films. Once Upon A Time In The West placed 30th on their list.
- In 2016, the Directors Guild of America ranked the film 80th on its list of The 80 Best-Directed Films since the Guild’s founding in 1936.

=== Year-end lists ===
The film is recognized by American Film Institute in these lists:

- 2003: AFI's 100 Years...100 Heroes & Villains:
  - Frank – Nominated Villain
- 2005: AFI's 100 Years of Film Scores – Nominated

== Film references ==
Leone's intent was to take the stock conventions of the American Westerns of John Ford, Howard Hawks, and others, and rework them in an ironic fashion, essentially reversing their intended meaning in their original sources to create a darker connotation. The most obvious example of this is the casting of veteran film good guy Henry Fonda as the villainous Frank, but many other, more subtle reversals occur throughout the film.

According to film critic and historian Christopher Frayling, the film quotes from as many as 30 classic American Westerns:

- The Comancheros (1961): The names "McBain" and "Sweetwater" may come from this film. Contrary to popular belief, the name of the town "Sweetwater" was not taken from Victor Sjöström's silent epic drama The Wind. Bernardo Bertolucci has stated that he looked at a map of the Southwestern United States, found the name of the town in Arizona, and decided to incorporate it into the film. However, both "Sweetwater" and a character named "McBain" appeared in The Comancheros, which Leone admired.
- Johnny Guitar (1954): Jill and Vienna have similar backstories (both are former prostitutes who become saloonkeepers), and both own land where a train station will be built because of access to water. Also, Harmonica, like Sterling Hayden's title character, is a mysterious, gunslinging outsider known by his musical nickname. Some of West's central plot (Western settlers vs. the railroad company) may be recycled from Nicholas Ray's film.
- The Iron Horse (1924): West may contain several subtle references to this film, including a low-angle shot of a shrieking train rushing towards the screen in the opening scene, and the shot of the train pulling into the Sweetwater station at the end.
- Shane (1953): Timmy McBain is learning to hunt, just as Joey does in Shane. Both films feature rough-hewn caskets.
- The Searchers (1956): Leone admitted that the rustling bushes, the silencing of insect sounds, and the fluttering grouse that suggests menace is approaching the farmhouse when the McBain family is massacred were all taken from The Searchers. The ending of the film—where Western nomads Harmonica and Cheyenne move on rather than join modern society—also echoes the famous ending of Ford's film.
- Winchester '73 (1950): The scenes in West at the trading post are claimed to be based on those in Winchester '73, but the resemblance is slight.
- The Man Who Shot Liberty Valance (1962): The dusters (long coats) worn by Cheyenne and his gang (and by Frank and his men while impersonating them) resemble those worn by Liberty Valance (Lee Marvin) and his henchmen when they are introduced in this film. In addition, the auction scene in West was intended to recall the election scene in Liberty Valance.
- The Last Sunset (1961): The final duel between Frank and Harmonica is shot almost identically to the duel between Kirk Douglas and Rock Hudson in this film.
- Duel in the Sun (1946): The character of Morton, the crippled railroad baron in West, was based on the character played by Lionel Barrymore in this film.

== See also ==
- List of cult films
- List of Italian films of 1968
- List of highest-grossing films in France
- List of highest-grossing films in Germany
