= Casey, Crime Photographer (TV series) =

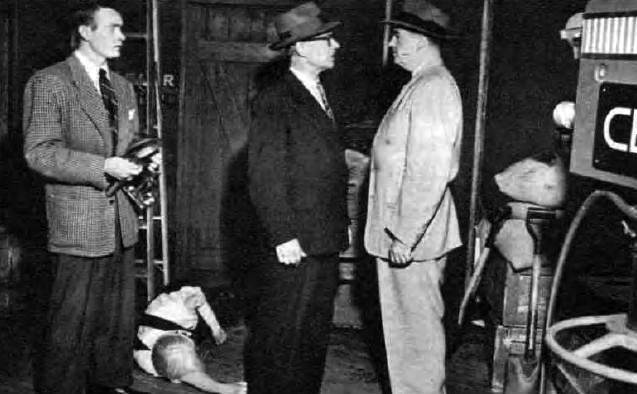
- 1951 photo from the television series (McGavin to left)
- Also known as: Crime Photographer
- Created by: George Harmon Coxe
- Starring: Richard Carlyle; Darren McGavin; Jan Miner; John Gibson; Cliff Hall; Donald McClelland; Archie Smith
- Composer: Morton Gould
- Country of origin: United States
- Original language: English
- No. of seasons: 2
- No. of episodes: 57

Production
- Producer: Martin Manulis
- Production location: New York City
- Running time: 30 minutes

Original release
- Network: CBS
- Release: April 19, 1951 – June 5, 1952

Casey, Crime Photographer (also known simply as Crime Photographer) is an American crime drama television series that aired from April 19, 1951, to June 5, 1952, on the CBS Television Network. The series ran for 57 episodes over two seasons. It was based on the successful radio series of the same name which was based on the novels by George Harmon Coxe.

The series starred Richard Carlyle originally as the title role of Jack "Flashgun" Casey. Later, Darren McGavin would take on the title role. The series co-starred actress Jan Miner as Ann Williams, Jack's girlfriend and a fellow reporter.

== Origins ==
In 1934, author George Harmon Coxe who was already known for the writer of Black Mask magazine, which was launched in 1920, created a new character called Jack Casey who solved crimes for the police.

The character was so successful in the magazine that Coxe wrote a novel about him called Silent Are the Dead in 1942. There were also two movie made about him entitled Women Are Trouble, (1936), and Here's Flash Casey, (1938). Another Casey novel was written entitled Murder For Two in 1943. There were three more Casey novels released; Error of Judgement, (1961), The Man Who Died Too Soon, (1962), and Broken Image, (1964).

On July 7, 1943, the CBS Radio Network launched the long-running radio series called Casey, Crime Photographer, (originally called Flashgun Casey). The show was very successful. It was renamed in April 1944 to Casey, Press Photographer, and again in June 1945 to Crime Photographer. It was finally called Casey, Crime Photographer in March 1947. The radio series was cancelled on November 16, 1950. It was revived and put back on the radio as simply Crime Photographer. It was only on for a year from January 13, 1954–April 22, 1955 before being permanently cancelled.

Between the cancelation of the radio series in 1950 and the revival of it in 1954, CBS Television aired a television series for one year entitled Casey, Crime Photographer (also known as Crime Photographer).

== Synopsis ==
Casey, Crime Photographer premiered on Thursday, April 19, 1951, on CBS. Richard Carlyle portrayed the title role of Jack Casey, nicknamed “Flashgun” for the first five episodes, but was replaced by Darren McGavin for the rest of the series.

Casey is a reporter, specifically a photographer, for the fictional newspaper, The Morning Express in New York. Casey usually reports at crimes, photographing crime scenes. He collaborates with the police and participates in the solving of these crimes. His girlfriend, Ann Williams, which was played by future Palmolive spokesperson and actress Jan Miner for the entire series, is also a reporter at The Express.

Every week on every episode, Casey goes to the Blue Note Café, where a bartender named Ethelbert is usually always there waiting for Casey to tell him his most recent job experience and his most recent crime investigation.

The season one finale aired on August 30, 1951.

=== Season 2 changes ===
Season 2 premiered on September 7, 1951.

The major changes that occurred during the season were mainly cast related.

The role of Ethelbert the bartender changed as season two rolled around. Originally, the role of Ethelbert was played by actor John Gibson. In June 1951, along with Carlyle, Gibson was replaced by Cliff Hall who entered season two playing the role of Ethelbert.

Season two also saw the birth of a new character, Jack Lipman. Lipman was Casey's partner. Lipman was portrayed by actor Archie Smith.

Jan Miner maintained her role as Casey's girlfriend and fellow Express reporter, Ann Williams.

CBS cancelled the show in 1952. Its last episode aired on June 5, 1952.

== Cast ==
- Jack "Flashgun" Casey – Portrayed by Richard Carlyle originally. Darren McGavin took over the role in June 1951 and through season two, (the final season). Casey is a photographer/reporter who works at The Morning Express, a New York newspaper. He collaborates with the police to solve seemingly unsolvable crimes. In every episode, Casey is always at the Blue Note Café to tell the story of his last job endeavor to the patrons of the bar, (mainly the bartender).
- Ann Williams – Portrayed by Jan Miner for both seasons. Is also a reporter at The Express. Ann is also the girlfriend of Casey and occasionally is involved in Casey's "adventures".
- Ethelbert – Portrayed originally by John Gibson. It was replaced by Cliff Hall in June 1951. Ethelbert is a waiter/bartender at the Blue Note Café. Ethelbert is usually the one with whom Casey tells his stories to each week.
- Jack Lipman – Portrayed by Archie Smith. Lipman was a character introduced towards the end of season one in the Summer of 1951. Lipman became familiar with viewers of the series by the season two premiere on September 7, 1951. Lipman was Casey's partner, who assisted him in solving the crimes and getting pictures of them for The Express.

== Production notes ==
The series was telecast live from New York City for both of its seasons. The series aired on Thursday nights at 10:30 pm EST. The series was produced by Martin Manulis. This was his first production role in television. The series was directed by Sidney Lumet in his earliest television directing roles.

The music that would usually accompany Casey and his conversations with Ethelbert were performed by The Tony Mottola Trio.

The last episode of Casey, Crime Photographer, aired nationally on June 5, 1952. But two other episodes of the series aired only in New York on June 12 and 19, 1952.

After the series ended its run in June 1952, CBS replaced the series with the game show I've Got a Secret which premiered on June 19, 1952

== Ratings ==
In a recent rating of the Most Popular Drama of the 1950s, is ranked number 72 on the list. The series ranked behind Lux Video Theatre which was #70.
