= Mark Trail =

American comic strip

- Authors: Ed Dodd (1946–1978); Jack Elrod (1978–2014); James Allen (2014–2020); Jules Rivera (2020–present)
- Illustrators: Ed Dodd (1946–1950 daily); Tom Hill (1946–1978 Sundays; 1950–1978 daily); Jack Elrod (1950s–1978 assistant; 1978–2014 primary); James Allen (2014–2020); Jules Rivera (2020–present)
- Launch date: April 15, 1946
- Syndicate(s): Post-Hall Syndicate (1946–1987); King Features (1987–2020)
- Publisher(s): Fawcett Publications, Standard/Nedor/Pines
- Genre: Adventure

The Mark Trail studio was on the second floor of Ed Dodd's home in the Lost Forest at the Atlanta suburb of Sandy Springs, Georgia. At work are (l. to r.) Ed Dodd, Jack Elrod, Tom Hill and Rhett Carmichael. The 130-acre Lost Forest was the model for the fictional Lost Forest National Forest in the strip. Dodd's house was located on Marsh Creek, a tributary of the Chattahoochee River. To see this image at full resolution, go to the Preservation Society for Spring Creek Forest.

Mark Trail is a newspaper comic strip created by the American cartoonist Ed Dodd. Introduced April 15, 1946, the strip centers on environmental and ecological themes. As of 2020, King Features syndicated the strip to "nearly 150 newspapers and digital outlets worldwide."

When Mark Trail began, it was syndicated through the New York Post in 1946 to 45 newspapers. Dodd, working as a national parks guide, had long been interested in environmental issues. The character is loosely based on the life and career of Charles N. Elliott (November 29, 1906 – May 1, 2000). At the time a U.S. forest ranger, Elliott would go on to edit Outdoor Life magazine from 1956 to 1974. Dodd once said that the physical model for Trail was John Wayt, his former neighbor in north Atlanta.

== Characters and story ==
Mark Trail, the main character, is a photojournalist and outdoor magazine writer whose assignments lead him into danger and adventure. His assignments inevitably lead him to discover environmental misdeeds, most often solved with a crushing right cross.

Trail lives in the fictional Lost Forest National Forest with his St. Bernard, Andy; veterinarian Doc Davis; Doc's daughter, and Trail's girlfriend and eventual wife, Cherry, and their adopted son, Rusty. "Mark reflects a reverence for God's creatures, nature, and the conservation of woods, water and wildlife" (Hill, 2003). His assignments in later story arcs tended to involve more sleuthing than wildlife photojournalism.

- Mark Trail – Wildlife photographer and writer for Woods and Wildlife Magazine. In his early 30s; honest and upright; his strongest imprecation was famously "What th'?!"
- Rusty – Introduced in 1981, Rusty Wilson is an orphan and the nephew of an abusive alcoholic named Joe. Rusty bonds with Sassy, one of a litter of Dalmatian puppies, against his animal-hating uncle's wishes. When Joe abandoned Sassy in the woods, Rusty went looking for her and became lost as well, until he was discovered by Mark and Cherry. Mark's intervention saved Rusty's life, and he was taken in as one of their own. Uncle Joe later kidnapped Rusty and phoned Mark with a ransom demand, but the sound of a squeaking weather-gauge heard over the phone revealed his location to Mark and the authorities. Rusty was officially adopted into the Trail family in 1993, when Mark and Cherry married.
- Andy – Mark's faithful Saint Bernard.
- Cherry Davis – Longtime (47 years) girlfriend of Mark until they married in 1993, living with Mark and her father (Doc) at Lost Forest. She is usually a supporting character, but she has sometimes (e.g., 1998) had her own wildlife adventures.
- Tom "Doc" Davis – A veterinarian who is Cherry's elderly father.
- Johnny Malotte – A presumably French-Canadian outdoorsman friend of Mark's since the 1950s, living with his family in the Quetico area of western Ontario.
- Kelly Welly – Pretty but selfish and foolhardy wildlife photographer whose flirtations with Mark, and her competitiveness with him over both his work and Cherry's affections, land both of them in trouble; a semi-regular character.
- Bill Ellis – Mark and Kelly's editor at Woods and Wildlife Magazine, appearing intermittently when sending Mark on another assignment.
- Ranger Rick Rogers – Wildlife ranger (2006), one of Mark's ubiquitous friends and contacts around the country who tend to appear in single adventures (possibly named for the National Wildlife Federation's mascot Ranger Rick)

== Cartoonists ==
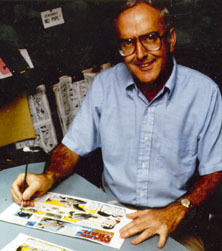
Jack Elrod at work on a Mark Trail Sunday strip

In the mid-1940s, Ed Dodd was employed in advertising. Dodd created Mark Trail, which he successfully pitched to a syndicate, and the strip was launched on April 15, 1946, in the New York Post. Artist and naturalist Tom Hill joined Dodd on Mark Trail that year. Hill illustrated the Sunday strip, which was devoted to natural history and wildlife education, until 1978. Hill also took over most of the daily strip art after 1950, freeing Dodd to specialize in the scripting. During the late 1940s, the cartoonist Jack Davis worked one summer inking Mark Trail, which he later parodied in Mad as "Mark Trade."

Dodd and Jack Elrod met when they were with the Boy Scouts; Dodd was a Scout leader and Elrod was a Scout. In 1950, Dodd hired Elrod to work as the strip's background artist and letterer. In addition to Davis and Elrod, Dodd also hired Barbara Chen (who took over lettering) and secretary Rhett Carmichael. The strip's popularity grew through the mid-1960s, with Mark Trail appearing in nearly 500 newspapers through the North America Syndicate.

Tom Hill's son, Jack Hill, recalled life at Dodd's studio in the Lost Forest outside Atlanta:

The art studio where Tom Hill (my father), Jack Elrod and Barbara Chen worked was on the second floor, where they had a great view of the Forest. There was also a homesteader, groundskeeper Hubert Hamrick and his family, who lived at Lost Forest and maintained the ranch and animals. Besides native wildlife which abounded in the Forest, there was riding stables, guinea fowl, caged pigeons, a 10-acre fishing lake and of course, Andy, the great Saint Bernard who appeared as Mark’s companion in the comic strip. I would visit Andy every time I went to visit Ed Dodd or to go fishing at the Lost Forest lake. Andy never had the freedom of his fictional counterpart and was kept in a running pen bounded by chain links. Ed’s other dog, Mose, was usually found at his master’s feet as Ed smoked his afternoon pipe. Famous people would visit Lost Forest, such as Marlin Perkins, sharpshooters, big game hunters and newspaper/magazine journalists. Ed Dodd was a personal friend of Daniel Beard, one of the founders of the Boy Scouts in 1910 and a fellow naturalist and illustrator. They both attended the Art Students League in New York City.

Hill died in 1978, and Dodd retired shortly after. Elrod continued the strip, taking over writing and full art duties, and adding new characters. Based on the complaint of a reader in 1983, Elrod had Mark Trail abandon the trademark pipe that had been part of him from the beginning under likewise pipe-smoking Dodd. In 1993, Mark and Cherry finally married.

In 2010, after years of tutoring, Jack Elrod brought on artist James Allen as an assistant. Allen initially began by assisting on the weekly Sunday page, continuing the themes of wildlife education and natural history and also alerting readers to endangered species and notifications of newly discovered species. Soon after, Allen also started assisting on the daily stories as well.

Starting with the strip dated April 11, 2014, Elrod retired as the strip's primary artist, and Allen formally took over the position, though Elrod-drawn Sunday strips continued to appear for two months. Elrod died on February 3, 2016, at the age of 91.

By mutual consent with the syndicate, after Allen had posted a couple of controversial politically themed tweets using the handle "The Real Mark Trail", Allen abruptly left the position as Mark Trail's artist and writer in 2020. The feature was right in the middle of a story arc, which was left unresolved. Beginning July 27, 2020, Mark Trail began rerunning daily strips from the Jack Elrod era. New Allen-penned Sunday strips continued through August 16, 2020, after which point Jack Elrod-era Sunday pages were rerun.

After several months of reruns, Jules Rivera, creator of the webcomic Love, Joolz, took over the strip. Rivera's run began on October 12, 2020. Although Rivera said, "I want to respect the legacy," she also said, "There are going to be jolts galore."

== Reception ==
According to the US Fish and Wildlife Service, "Elrod's comics typically present information promoting public awareness of imperiled species." A notable exception is the strip that ran on March 11, 2007, which depicted the African Elephant not as imperiled, but as a peril itself. Letters appeared in numerous papers taking issue with the strip's contention that, "The two main killers in East Africa are HIV/AIDS and wild animals, particularly elephants." Several papers ran letters to the editor objecting to this assertion.

Jack Hill has criticized the strip for declining in quality since 1978. According to Hill, the earlier versions of the strip featured well-written plot and character development and a detailed art style, whereas later versions were marked by a loss of accuracy and detail and "a free-floating approach to perspective." In addition, time froze: scenes and plots have been recycled from the past. According to King Features, Mark now stays "forever 32". However, these changes, along with the uneven art work and misplaced speech balloons (often pointed at foregrounded animals), attracted a new following among fans called "Trailheads".

In some cases, daily strips have recycled art and slightly updated plots from 20- or 30-year-old strips. Updating includes deleting pipes and ashtrays, and rearranging panels. Close-ups of recycled animal art are added to cover extraneous word balloons or to create a new panel to add new dialogue.

== Radio ==
On January 30, 1950, Mutual Broadcasting System launched a radio adaptation, Mark Trail, featuring Matt Crowley in the title role. The 30-minute episodes aired three times weekly, and 174 episodes were produced, running until June 8, 1951. A second radio series, starring Staats Cotsworth, was broadcast on ABC beginning September 18, 1950, with 51 half-hour shows that ran thrice weekly until January, 1952. The series then switched to a 15-minute format, producing 125 episodes that aired weekdays through June 27, 1952. Only a handful of the 15-minute episodes are known to have survived.

The Minneapolis-St. Paul, public radio station KFAI hosted Mark Trail Radio Theatre starting in 1991. Produced by Babs Economon, its 17 adventures aired in 228 weekly installments on Friday evenings through September 2002.

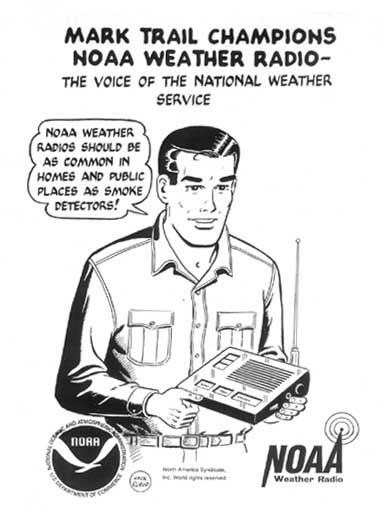
A National Weather Service public service announcement using Mark Trail to promote NOAA Weather Radio.

In 1997, the National Oceanic and Atmospheric Administration (NOAA) began using Mark Trail as its official mascot, making him the voice of the National Weather Service and NOAA Weather Radio.

A television pilot for a "Mark Trail" series was filmed in Australia and Canada in 1969, starring Todd Armstrong as Trail, and Robert Dunlap as Scotty. Produced by Bob Stabler, the pilot also featured Michael Pate, Gordon McDougall, and Susan Lloyd.

== Books and magazines ==
Mark Trail: The Magazine of Adventure for Boys

Between 1955 and 1959, Mark Trail's adventures were reprinted in comic books by Fawcett Publications and then Standard/Nedor/Pines. The strip spawned numerous books and coloring books, including:

- Mark Trail's Book of Animals (North American Mammals) by Ed Dodd (1955)
- Mark Trail's 2nd Book of Animals: (North American Mammals) by Ed Dodd (1959)
- Mark Trail's Hunting Tips by Ed Dodd (1969)
- Mark Trail's Cooking Tips by Ed Dodd (1971)
- Mark Trail's Camping Tips by Ed Dodd (1971)
- Mark Trail in the Smokies!: A Naturalist's Look at Great Smoky Mountains National Park and the Southern Appalachians by Ed Dodd (1989)

For the United States Fish and Wildlife Service, Elrod wrote and illustrated coloring books which have been distributed to students throughout the U.S. They include: Wetlands Coloring Book, Take Pride in America with Mark Trail: A Coloring Book, and Mark Trail Tells the Story of a Fish in Trouble.

The 1950s magazine, Mark Trail: The Magazine of Adventure for Boys, merged with The American Boy and The Open Road for Boys. The magazine was aimed at boys in the 9-17 age group to guide them in natural history and conservation.

== Awards ==
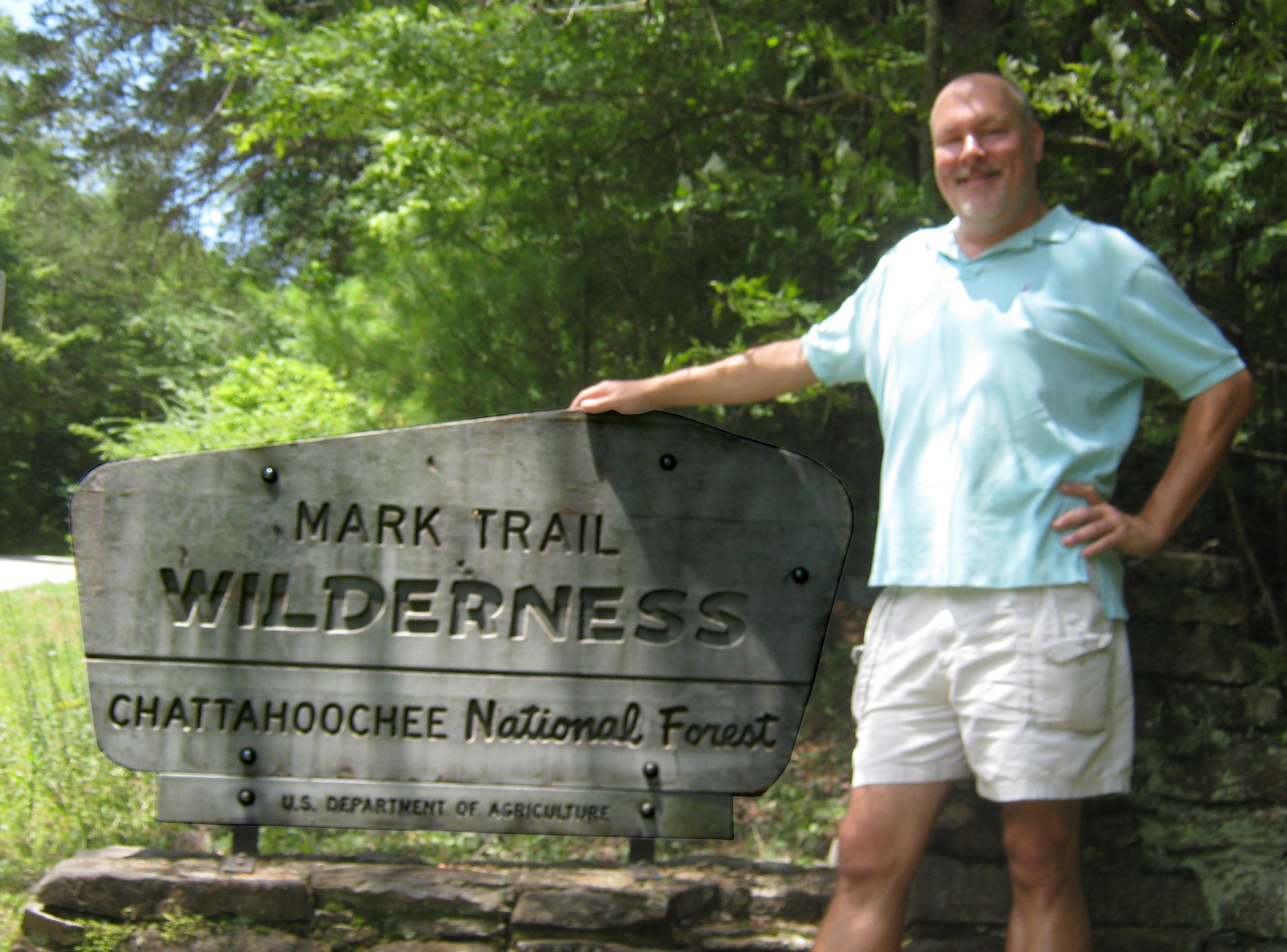
James Allen at the head of the Mark Trail Wilderness in the Chattahoochee National Forest

Mark Trail has won more than 30 conservation awards from private organizations and government agencies, including the American Waterfowl and Wetland Association, the Georgia Wildlife Association, the National Forest Association, the National Wildlife Federation, the U.S. Coast Guard and the U.S. Fish & Wildlife Service. An annual Mark Trail Award is presented to individuals, organizations or corporations that assist in expanding the radio network, or recognizing courageous effort in saving lives during weather or civil emergencies. Mark Trail has also appeared in a number of publications by the U.S. Fish and Wildlife Service in efforts to educate children concerning conservation and environmentalism.

In 1991, Congress allocated 16,400 acres (67 km^{2}) of former logged forest along the Appalachian Trail in Georgia to be designated the Mark Trail Wilderness. As of 2006, Mark Trail remains the only comic strip character to be recognized in such a manner, although an official association between Walt Kelly's Pogo and the Okefenokee Swamp was established in 1987, with an Annual Pogo Fest, followed by Pogo and the U.S. Postal Service's 1989 inauguration of a National Wetlands postcard dedicated to the Okefenokee Swamp.

== See also ==
- Smokey Bear
- Woodsy Owl
- Johnny Horizon

== Sources ==
- King Features Syndicate.
- Agena, Eric. Mark Trail, by Ed Dodd. ComicStripFan
- Gunn, Jerry. 2007. Mark Trail, alive and well and now 60. AccessNoGeorgia.com, NE Georgia History Center.
- Mark Trail radio log by Dick Judge and Frank M. Passage
