= Muriel Kirkland =

American actress

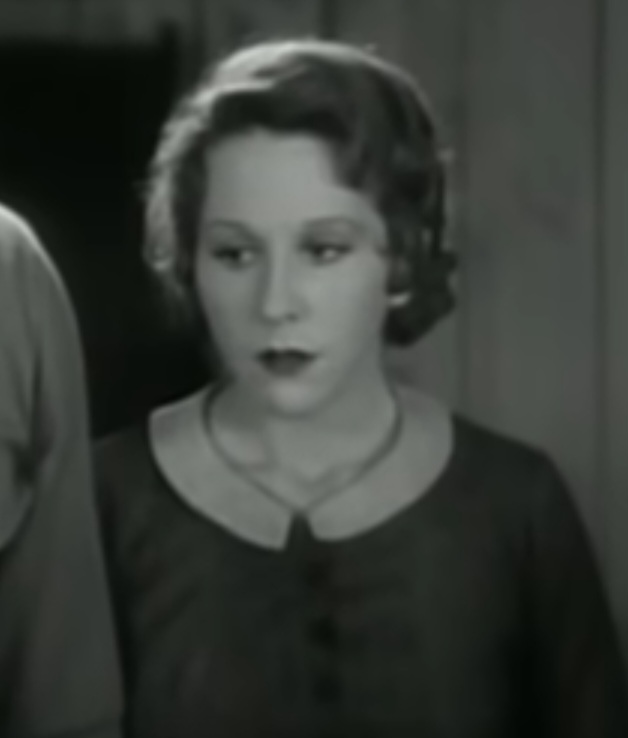
- Kirkland in To the Last Man (1933)
- Born: August 19, 1903; Yonkers, New York, U.S.
- Died: September 26, 1971 (aged 68); New York City, U.S.
- Occupation: Actress
- Years active: 1933–1965
- Spouse: Staats Cotsworth (m. 1936)

Muriel Kirkland (August 19, 1903 – September 26, 1971) was an American actress.

== Early years ==
Kirkland was born on August 19, 1903, in Yonkers, New York, the daughter of advertising executive Charles B. Kirkland and Margaret (Keith) Kirkland. As a teenager, Kirkland had "an inferiority complex of horrible proportions," accompanied by "a state of shyness and self-consciousness".

When she was 16 and had just finished convent school, her parents decided that she could best overcome her self-concerns by attending the American Academy of Dramatic Arts. Kirkland resisted, saying that she did not want to become an actress, but her parents were firm, and she enrolled. When Kirkland had been at the academy six months, she was dropped from the school and told, "You will never be an actress. We are sorry". She took the assessment as a challenge and left the school determined to become an actress. She was turned down by theatrical agencies until she gained a part with a stock company in Yonkers.

== Career ==
=== Stage ===
Soon after Kirkland's stage debut in Yonkers, an apprenticeship with Stuart Walker in Cincinnati increased her self-reliance as an actress, and he made her the leading lady of his Huntington, West Virginia, company. Walker taught her how to use her voice and her eyes and, in the process, increased her self-confidence.

Kirkland's first New York stage appearance occurred when she was 19, portraying Maria in The School for Scandal. Before that season ended, she was on Broadway, playing Nettie in Out of Step. She acted in the Broadway production of Strictly Dishonorable (1929) after being the "forty-ninth ingenue to read the part". Her other Broadway credits included Brass Buttons (1927), Cock Robin (1928), The Greeks Had a Word for It (1930), I Love an Actress (1931), Fast Service (1931), Lady of Letters (1935), Stop-over (1938), Abe Lincoln in Illinois (1938), Inherit the Wind (1955) and The Legend of Lizzie (1959).

Kirkland acted with the Orpheum Players in Kansas City and the All-Star Jefferson Players in Birmingham, Alabama, and performed in summer theater in Westchester County, New York; Magnolia, Massachusetts; and New Rochelle, New York. She also was the "unknown ingenue" in a company that Blanche Bates headed.

=== Radio ===
Kirkland was the fourth actress to have the title role in the radio soap opera The Story of Mary Marlin. During her tenure as Marlin, she re-enacted some of the program's critical moments in photographs that accompanied an article in the September 11, 1944, issue of Life magazine.

=== Film ===
Kirkland's family's financial problems in the Depression caused her to try acting in films. Although she received a contract from Metro-Goldwyn-Mayer in 1932, the studio was not satisfied with the way she looked when she was photographed, with the result that she received no parts and "entered a six-month period of nothingness". Eventually the studio cast her in Fast Workers (1933). After Kirkland's MGM contract ended, she worked as a freelance actress in films, including Cocktail Hour, Hold Your Man, To the Last Man, Nana and The Secret of the Blue Room.

== Personal life ==
Kirkland married actor Staats Jennings Cotsworth Jr. on May 24, 1936, in New York City. She died on September 26, 1971, of emphysema and complications, in Beth Israel Hospital in New York City, aged 68.
