= List of Casey, Crime Photographer stories in Black Mask =

for more in depth information about the magazine see Black Mask (magazine)

The Casey franchise was started in 1934 by George Harmon Coxe in Black Mask (magazine). A total of 22 stories were published in the magazine, plus two serialized novels. Note the company these stories keep within the pages of Black Mask such as Raymond Chandler & E. Stanley Gardner. This magazine was an important part of the pulp magazine genre.

Casey, Crime Photographer shorts, published in Black Mask (magazine)
Title	Volume-Issue, Month Year
Blood on the Lens	25-09, Jan 1943
Buried Evidence w/Tom Wade	18-05, July 1935
Casey Detective	17-12, Feb 1935
Earned Reward	18-01, Mar 1935
Fall Guy	19-04, June 1936
Hot Delivery	17-05, July 1934
Mr. Casey Flashgun's Murder	18-08, Oct 1935
Mixed Drinks	17-06, Aug 1934
Murder in the Red	25-02, June 1942
Murder Mixup	19-03, May 1936
Murder Picture	17-11, Jan 1935
Once Around the Click	24-01, May 1941
Pinch-Hitters	17-07, Sep 1934
Portrait of Murder	18-12, Feb 1936
Push-Over	17-04, June 1934
Return Engagement	17-01, Mar 1934
Special Assignment	17-02, April 1934
Thirty Two Tickets to Win	18-04, June 1935
Too Many Women	19-04, Sep 1936
Two Man Job	17-03, May 1934
Women are Trouble	18-02, April 1935
Casey and the Blonde Wren	August 1940

In addition to these stories, the two earliest novels were serialized over three issues each.
