= Jack Elrod =

American cartoonist

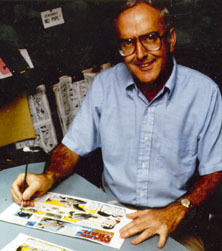
- Jack Elrod at work on a Mark Trail Sunday strip
- Born: March 29, 1924 Gainesville, Georgia, U.S.
- Died: February 16, 2016 (aged 91) Atlanta, Georgia, U.S.
- Area: Cartoonist
- Notable works: Mark Trail

Jack Elrod (March 29, 1924 – February 16, 2016) was an American cartoonist best known for the comic strip Mark Trail.

The creator of Mark Trail, Ed Dodd, began the strip in 1946. Elrod began working on the strip as an artist in 1950, then in 1978 when Dodd's eyesight failed he turned the strip over to Jack Elrod, who continued to draw it under both their names.

Elrod lived his whole life in Georgia and worked for King Features Syndicate for 64 years before dying in his sleep of kidney failure and related complications at age 91 in his home near Atlanta on February 3, 2016. Prior to becoming a cartoonist, Elrod served in the United States Navy for 3 and a half years f on board the USS Teton as a meteorologist during World War II, from 1942 at the age of 18 to 1945
