= Cully Richards =

American actor

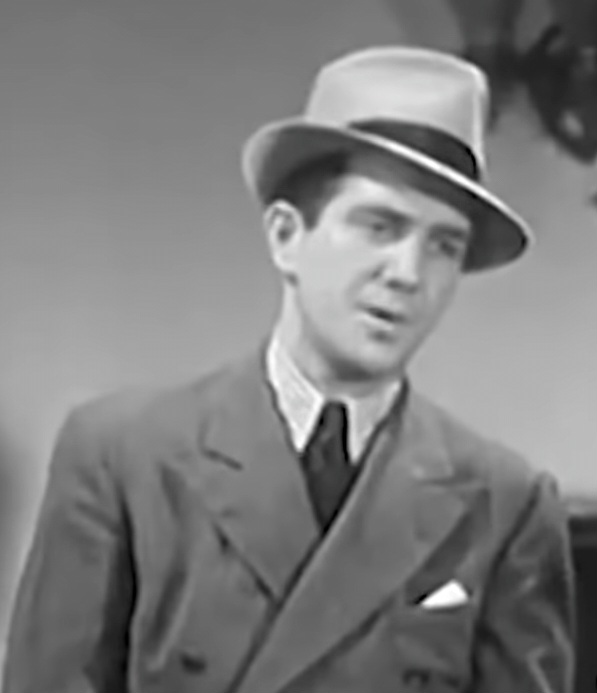
- Richards in Here's Flash Casey (1937)
- Born: October 31, 1908; Cleveland, Ohio, U.S.
- Died: June 17, 1978 (aged 69); Los Angeles, California, U.S.
- Resting place: Hollywood Forever Cemetery
- Occupations: Singer, actor
- Years active: 1934–1970

Cully Richards (October 31, 1908–June 17, 1978) was an American singer, and film and television actor. He had a recurring role as First Sergeant Stanley Wozniak on the 1962–1963 situation comedy Don't Call Me Charlie!.

== Death ==
Richards died, in Los Angeles, aged 69, on June 17, 1978. He is interred in Hollywood Forever Cemetery.

== Selected filmography ==
- Sing, Baby, Sing (1936)
- Pick a Star (1937)
- Something to Sing About (1937)
- Here's Flash Casey (1938)
- Swing It, Sailor! (1938)
- Let's Face It (1943)
- Race Street (1948)

== Bibliography ==
- Everett Aaker. George Raft: The Films. McFarland, 2013.
