= Tony Marvin =

American radio and television announcer

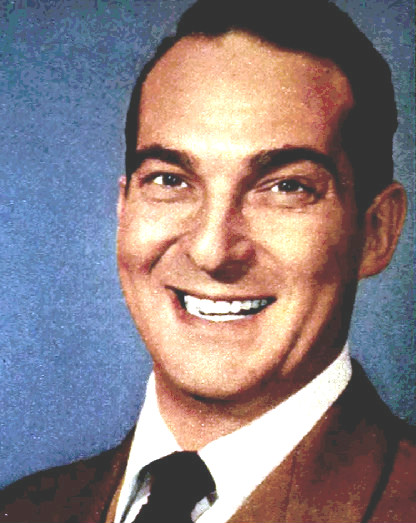
- Marvin in 1950.
- Born: Marvin Sandusky; October 5, 1912; New York, New York
- Died: October 10, 1998 (aged 86); Boynton Beach, Florida
- Occupations: Radio and television announcer

Tony Marvin (October 5, 1912 – October 10, 1998) was an American radio and television announcer. He became a staff announcer for CBS, and later became most known as the long-time announcer for Arthur Godfrey.

== Early life ==
Marvin was born on October 5, 1912. A graduate of Erasmus Hall High School, he nearly became a doctor, graduating from St. John's University and attending the Long Island College of Medicine for two years. However, the Great Depression intervened, and he had to drop out to help to support his family. Marvin's obituary in the New York Times noted that "his big break" came during the latter job. It said, "As he serviced a limousine, the owner heard him singing and offered to pay for a vocal teacher for him The result was a scholarship for a year's study with an MGM voice coach." From that training, Marvin performed with the New York Operatic Guild and in some theatrical light comedies.

== The Godfrey years in radio ==
Marvin's first job in radio was at WNYC in New York City. From there, he went to CBS as a staff announcer, beginning October 1, 1939. A 1959 article in Radio and Television Mirror reported that at CBS "Tony did everything from daytime serials to symphonies and in 1946, when the Arthur Godfrey morning show was sustaining, Tony was assigned to it." When Godfrey's activities expanded from Arthur Godfrey Time to include Arthur Godfrey's Talent Scouts and Arthur Godfrey and his Friends, Marvin did the announcing for those shows as well. Other radio shows for which Marvin was announcer included Casey, Crime Photographer, The Sparrow and the Hawk, Columbia Workshop, This Life Is Mine, Major Bowes Amateur Hour, Vox Pop, Radie Harris, Winner Take All and Stage Door Canteen.

Godfrey at times stirred controversy with his firing of his show's personnel. Marvin was the last of Godfrey's supporting players to go. He had been with Godfrey 12 years when he learned in 1959 that Godfrey would not need an announcer for the coming year. An Associated Press story in The Miami News reported: "The TV and radio star said his new program will be very informal and he will handle all the commercials himself. Godfrey told Marvin he regretted their association had to end and thanked him for his services." Marvin's departure was widely perceived as a more amicable parting than Godfrey's previous dismissals of cast members, which were often abrupt.

== Post-Godfrey years in radio ==
Marvin branched out in 1958, adding a two-hour, Monday-Saturday disc jockey show on WABC to his other duties. Columnist Marie Torre reported in her newspaper column that the show would differ from other DJ programs "in its public spirit." Marvin planned to honor a "Hero of the Week" and "visit hospitals, worthy charitable functions and various points of interest."

In 1961, Marvin became host of My True Story, a radio drama that moved to the Mutual Broadcasting System after having been on ABC and NBC for a total of 17 years. That same year he became a newscaster for Mutual. An ad for that network in Sponsor magazine touted Marvin's role, saying, "Always one of the top news commentators in the business, now he's in the Mutual line-up -- bringing his news experience into play -- as a regular member of Mutual Radio's news corps." An article in Sponsor in 1962 noted the influence of Mutual's Affiliates Advisory Committee on the network's decision to hire Marvin for that role: "What are some of the more recent programing moves initiated by the committee? ... Insistence on stronger news voices, for one. ... Result: The hiring of Tony Marvin and Del Sharbutt to strengthen the lineup ...." Marvin's duties at Mutual were not limited to newscasts. The January 1962 issue of TV Radio Mirror reported, "He's working a full day on commercials and as a newscaster at Mutual."

== Radio after the networks ==
In his later years, Marvin had two more stints with programs on local radio stations. In 1976, he had a four-hour afternoon show, "Tony's Time," on WATR in Waterbury, Connecticut. A story in the Toledo Blade reported: "'I'm my own engineer for the first time in years,' Marvin said. 'I'm enjoying it.' He cues records, pushes the buttons for the taped commercials, and decides what kind of music to play, including show tunes, vocals, big bands, and lighter contemporary sounds." Beginning in 1977, Marvin had a show on WDJZ in Bridgeport, Connecticut, which at the time was one of the first radio stations playing the "Music of Your Life" format, consisting primarily of music from the big band era. In 1981, Marvin came out of retirement to do "The Tony Marvin Show," a one-hour program broadcast live from the Palm Beach Hilton on WKAO. He said, "I want to bring back live radio." The show originated in the hotel's dining room and featured an orchestra. An anecdote in a newspaper article summarized the program and Marvin's reason for doing it.:

[V]ocalist Kit Stewart stepped to the microphone and announced she would sing "That Old Feeling." "Oh, you've got that old feeling," Marvin mused. "I sure do." "Well, it looks good on you." A couple with their young child listened from cushioned arm chairs in a corner by the windows while Ms. Stewart sang in her sensuous voice. "It brought back that old feeling to me," said Marvin when she finished, "because that's the way it used to be in radio." Indeed it was. The same kind of songs and unrehearsed chatter done on the show were the format of Arthur Godfrey's radio shows in the latter 1940s.

Marvin died in Boyton beach Florida in 1998 of complications from a heart attack at age 85.

== Other professional activities ==
Marvin's obituary in The New York Times noted that he "was made the official 'voice' of the New York World's Fair" of 1939.

On television, in addition to his work with the Godfrey programs, Marvin was the "Voice of Authority" on the CBS program, We Take Your Word.

In 1957, Marvin recorded an LP album, "Words and Music of Love," featuring his recitation of poems backed by Lee Erwin's organ music. A review in The Billboard summarized the recording thus: "Tony Marvin ... reads a group of love poems (mostly by contemporary American poets) with a surprising amount of reticence and tenderness."

== Family ==
Marvin married Dorothea Wiener June 6, 1937. They had one daughter, Lynda.
