= Cocktail Hour (film) =

1933 film

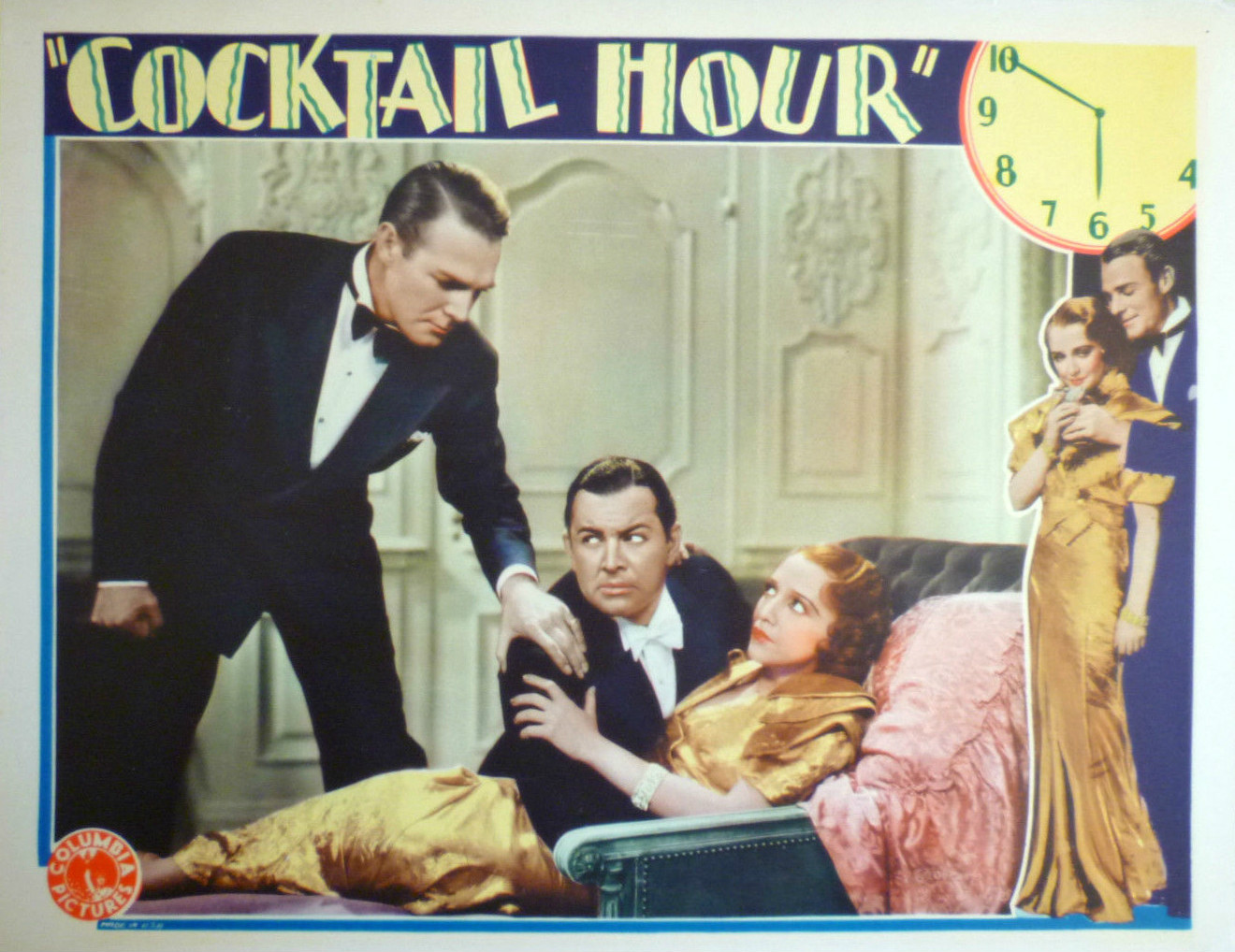
- Lobby card
- Directed by: Victor Schertzinger
- Screenplay by: Gertrude Purcell; Richard Schayer
- Based on: Pearls and Emeralds story by James Kevin McGuinness
- Produced by: Robert North; Victor Schertzinger
- Starring: Bebe Daniels
- Cinematography: Joseph H. August
- Edited by: Jack Dennis
- Music by: Victor Schertzinger
- Distributed by: Columbia Pictures
- Release date: June 5, 1933
- Running time: 73 minutes
- Country: United States
- Language: English

Cocktail Hour is a 1933 American pre-Code romantic drama film produced and distributed by Columbia Pictures and starring Bebe Daniels. This film was directed by Victor Schertzinger.

A copy of the film is preserved in the Library of Congress.

== Plot ==
Cynthia Warren is an attractive and talented illustrator for major magazines, living the high life in a fashionable New York City penthouse. Proud of her accomplishments and her independence, she has no interest in marriage or children despite her many suitors seeking her hand in marriage. Prior to leaving on a vacation to Europe, she throws herself a going-away party and plans to leave on the ship at midnight, but her boss, Randolph Morgan, calls and insists she bring over her latest leggy cigarette ad illustration before her departure. He professes his love for her and locks her in the bathroom when she attempts to leave through the wrong door; a watchman hears her screams and lets her out in time for her to make it to her ship. In her suite, she gives one last party. Randolph turns up just before the ship sets sail and tells Cynthia he wants to marry her, to which she objects again.

During the trip, Cynthia falls for William Lawton, a fellow wealthy passenger who takes her for a "sporting girl"; they spend a rather intimate night together. While getting off the ship, he informs her he is married and can only see her on the sly. She and another friend she made on the ship, Olga Raimoff, decide to go out to a bar and get drunk to celebrate Cynthia's newly-free status—and wake up several days later. At a party given by her friend, Princess de Longville, William shows up with his wife who publicly insults her. Lawton follows her to her hotel, as does de Longville's son Philippe; a fight breaks out between the two of them, resulting in Philippe pushing Lawton out a window and leaving him for dead. Cynthia takes the blame for the spat. Eventually Randolph arrives and pretends he doesn't care about her, saying he only wants illustrations for his magazine. She realizes her love for him and finally consents to marry him.

== Cast ==
- Bebe Daniels as Cynthia Warren
- Randolph Scott as Randolph Morgan
- Sidney Blackmer as William Lawton
- Muriel Kirkland as Olga Raimoff, aka Tessie Burns
- Jessie Ralph as Princess de Longville
- Barry Norton as Prince Philippe de Longville
- George Nardelli as Raoul Alvarez
- Marjorie Gateson as Mrs. Pat Brown
- Jay Eaton as Jerry (uncredited)
- Wild Bill Elliott as Party Guest (uncredited)
- Willie Fung as Mori (uncredited)
- Forrester Harvey as Barfly (uncredited)
- Kenneth MacDonald as Ship's Steward (uncredited)
- Alphonse Martell as French Butler (uncredited)
- Paul McVey as Attorney (uncredited)
- Dennis O'Keefe as Party Guest (uncredited)
- Lorin Raker as Well-Wisher (uncredited)
- Rolfe Sedan as Hotel Clerk (uncredited)
- Phillips Smalley as Captain (uncredited)
- Oscar Smith as Porter (uncredited)
- John St. Polis as French Police Investigator (uncredited)
- Larry Steers as Dick (uncredited)
- Florence Wix as Party Guest (uncredited)
