= Here's Flash Casey =

- Directed by: Lynn Shores
- Written by: George Harmon Coxe (story); John W. Krafft (screenplay)
- Produced by: Arthur Alexander (producer); Max Alexander (producer); Alfred Stern (associate producer)
- Cinematography: Marcel Le Picard
- Edited by: Charles Henkel Jr.
- Production company: Grand National
- Release date: October 22, 1937
- Running time: 58 minutes
- Country: United States
- Language: English

Here's Flash Casey is a 1937 American film directed by Lynn Shores and starring Eric Linden and Boots Mallory.

== Plot ==
Flash Casey is able finally to get the job as photographer at Globe Press. And he would like to marry newspaper woman Kay Lanning. Some blackmailing-crooks are stealing pictures from people who bring them in to be developed in the shop run by the same crooks, to blackmail socialites. Then Kay is kidnapped and Flash is able with some help to find her.

== Cast ==
- Eric Linden as "Flash" Casey
- Boots Mallory as Kay Lanning
- Cully Richards as Tom Wade
- Holmes Herbert as Major Rodney Addison
- Joseph Crehan as Blaine (City Editor)
- Howard Lang as "Pop" Lawrence
- Victor Adams as "King" Ricker
- Harry Harvey as Gus Payton
- Suzanne Kaaren as Mitzi LaRue
- Matty Kemp as Rodney Addison Jr.
- Dorothy Vaughan as Mrs.O'Hara (Landlady)
- Maynard Holmes as Joe (Roommate)
- unbilled players include Sven Hugo Borg, Lynton Brent, Don Brodie, Leonard Carey, Virginia Dabney, and Spec O'Donnell

== See also ==
- Casey, Crime Photographer
