= Ed Dodd =

American cartoonist (1902–1991)

- Ed Dodd by Walt Kelly
- Born: Edward Benton Dodd; November 7, 1902 LaFayette, Georgia, U.S.
- Died: May 27, 1991 (aged 88) Gainesville, Georgia, U.S.
- Area: Cartoonist
- Notable works: Mark Trail (1946–1978)

Edward Benton Dodd (November 7, 1902 – May 27, 1991) was a 20th-century American cartoonist known for his Mark Trail comic strip.

== Early years ==
Born in LaFayette, Georgia to Reverend Jesse Mercer Dodd and Effie Cook Dodd (the artist Lamar Dodd was his first cousin), Ed Dodd went to work for Dan Beard, founder of the Boy Scouts of America, at the age of 16. Dodd worked at Beard's camp in Pennsylvania for 13 summers, where he honed his writing and illustration skills under Beard's guidance. Dodd became a scoutmaster and the first paid youth and physical education director for the city of Gainesville, Georgia.

== Back Home Again ==
After studying architecture at Georgia Tech and at the Art Students League of New York, he purchased a ranch in Wyoming in 1926. In 1930, while working as a guide in the national parks, he created Back Home Again, a moderately successful daily single-panel which included characters from Gainesville and North Georgia. The panel, about a hillbilly family, was distributed nationally by United Feature Syndicate until 1945.

== Mark Trail ==
On April 15, 1946, he launched Mark Trail as a daily comic strip distributed by The New York Post to 45 newspapers. Mark Trail centers on environmental themes and its title character, a wildlife photographer and author whose assignments inevitably lead to involvement in local environmental conflicts. Trail was a younger "alter ego" of Dodd (Gurr 2006), likewise a pipe-smoking outdoorsman and conservationist but footloose and free to travel to adventure. Trail owned a St. Bernard named Andy and lived (between travels) with Doc and Cherry Davis in Lost Forest. Likewise, Dodd had a St. Bernard named Andy, and owned a home and studio (designed by Frank Lloyd Wright's student Herbert Millkey) in a 130-acre (0.5 km^{2}) forest in North Georgia that he named Lost Forest. Dodd's challenge with this alter ego was to write an educational outdoors-themed continuity strip, in varied settings, about a good-guy conservationist who nevertheless remained credible as a man in his responses to exploiters and to underdogs, and to romance and to hardship. At its peak in the 1960s, the strip enjoyed distribution to about 500 newspapers through North America Syndicate and spun off numerous publications about camping and wildlife.

Mark Trail was written by Dodd and drawn by Tom Hill until the latter's death in 1978. Dodd then retired, and the strip was continued by his long-time assistant, Jack Elrod, and later by James Allen and Jules Rivera.

Dodd enjoyed wide respect for his support of conservation, and among his honors was Georgia Conservationist of the Year in 1967. On the occasion of the 40th anniversary of Mark Trail in 1986, he told a reporter that he had quit Georgia Tech's architecture program because of failing grades in math and chemistry. "In my case, finishing college would have been a mistake," he said. "I'd probably have become a mediocre architect and starved to death." Towards the end of his life, he established the Mark Trail/Ed Dodd Foundation. He died in Gainesville in 1991, survived by his fourth wife, Rosemary, who still resides in Gainesville. Rosemary Dodd died in 2023 after many years of steering the Mark Trail Foundation. That same year of 1991, the U.S. Congress honored Dodd's hero with the Mark Trail Wilderness in the Chattahoochee National Forest. Dodd's 130-acre Lost Forest is now residential neighborhoods, one bearing the name "Lost Forest" with a street named "Mark Trail". In 1996, the house formerly occupied by Dodd in Lost Forest burned to the ground (Hill 2003).

== Works ==
- Mark Trail's 2nd book of animals: (North American mammals), by Ed Dodd, 1959
- Mark Trail's Book of Animals (North American Mammals), by Ed Dodd, 1965
- Flapfoot (Carousel book), by Ed Dodd, 1968
- Chipper the Beaver (A See and read beginning to read book), by Ed Dodd, 1968
- Mark Trail's Hunting Tips, by Ed Dodd, 1969
- Careers for the '70s: conservation (Crowell-Collier careers), by Ed Dodd, 1971
- Mark Trail's Cooking Tips, by Ed Dodd, 1971
- Mark Trail's Camping Tips, by Ed Dodd, 1971
- Mark Trail in the Smokies!: A Naturalist's Look at Great Smoky Mountains National Park and the Southern Appalachians, by Ed Dodd, 1989

== Sources ==
- Georgia Tech Alumni. Deaths: Ed Dodd
- Gurr, Steve. 2006. New Georgia Encyclopedia: Ed Dodd
- Hill, Jack. 2003. "Memories of Lost Forest", talk before the Pleasant Oaks Gem and Mineral Society, June 5, 2003
- Wilderness.net. Mark Trail Wilderness
