= Richard Carlyle =

Canadian-American actor (1914–2009)

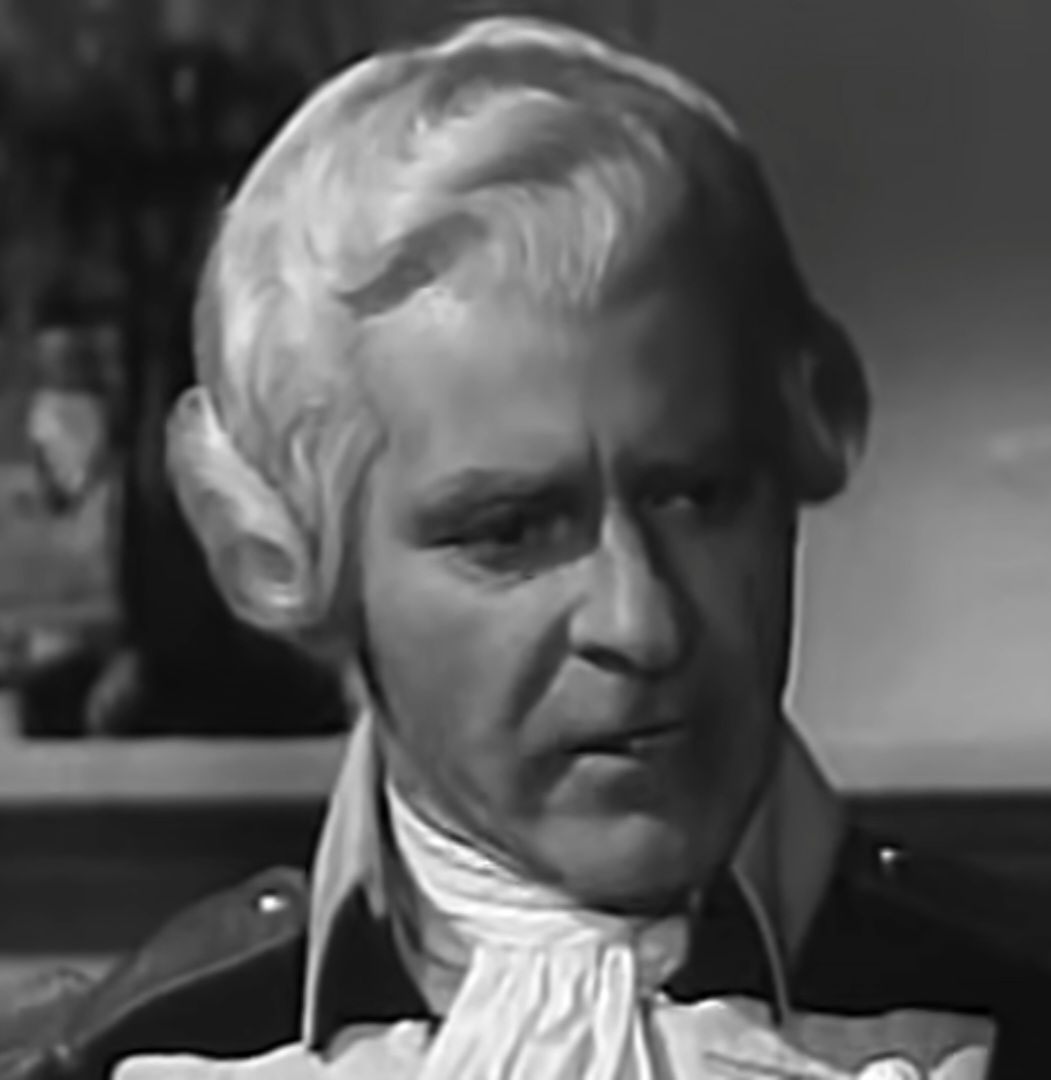
- Carlyle in the TV series One Step Beyond, episode "Night of Decision", 1961
- Born: March 20, 1914; St. Catharines, Ontario, Canada
- Died: November 15, 2009 (aged 95); Los Angeles, California, U.S.
- Occupation: Actor
- Years active: 1950–1994

Richard Carlyle (March 20, 1914 – November 15, 2009) was a Canadian-American film, television and Broadway actor. (Note: IBDb has blended credits of the two Richard Carlyles. All credits before 1949 are to the Richard Carlyle born in 1879.) (Note: The reference book Encyclopedia of Early Television Crime Fighters: All Regular Cast Members in American Crime and Mystery Series gives Carlyle's birth date as March 20, 1920.)

== Early years ==
Carlyle was born in St. Catharines, Ontario, Canada. His education included attendance at Sherwood Dramatic Art School and the Art Institute of Chicago.

== Career ==
Carlyle's early work on stage came with the troupe at the Barter Theatre and in stock theatre in Springfield, Illinois.

On television, Carlyle co-starred in "The Long Walk", the May 30, 1950, episode of Cameo Theatre. In 1951, Carlyle starred as Jack Casey in the television version of Casey, Crime Photographer on CBS.

He had a prolific career beginning in the 1950s appearing in a variety of theatre productions and as a character actor on numerous television series. He played Rezin Bowie in The Iron Mistress (1952) and Commander Don Adams in the Oscar-nominated war drama Torpedo Run (1959) starring Glenn Ford. He also had a long tenure with Theatre West in Los Angeles.

In the original Star Trek series he played Lieutenant Carl Jaeger in "The Squire of Gothos" (1967).

== Death ==
Carlyle died in Los Angeles on November 15, 2009 at the age of 95.

== Filmography ==
Year	Title	Role	Notes
1951	Target Unknown	Brooklyn	
1952	The Iron Mistress	Rezin Bowie	
1958	Torpedo Run	Commander Don Adams	
1960	The Gallant Hours	Father Frederic Gehring	
1961	Alfred Hitchcock Presents	Mace	Season 7 Episode 8: "The Old Pro"
1963	The Alfred Hitchcock Hour	Dr. Leo Wales	Season 1 Episode 20: "The Paragon"
1965	Gunsmoke	Carl	Season 10 Episode 18: “One Killer On Ice"
1966	Harper	Fred Platt	
1967	Star Trek (Original Series)	Yeager	"The Squire of Gothos"
1967	Sail to Glory	George Schugler	
1973	Brady Bunch	Mr Hillary - school principal	'Bobby's Hero' episode
1990	Going Under	General Air Quality	
