= Joyce Gordon =

American actress (1929–2020)

- Born: March 25, 1929; Des Moines, Iowa, United States
- Died: February 28, 2020 (aged 90)
- Education: University of Illinois; University of Wisconsin
- Occupation: Actress
- Spouse: Bernard Grant
- Children: 2

Joyce Gordon (March 25, 1929 – February 28, 2020) was an American actress.

== Early life ==
Joyce Gordon was born on March 25, 1929, in Des Moines, Iowa, to Jule and Diana (Cohn) Gordon. Her father was the founder of the National Barber and Beauty Manufacturers Association. She grew up in Chicago, later attending the University of Illinois and the University of Wisconsin. In her late teens, she left Chicago and went to New York to seek opportunities to appear on television programs.

== Career ==
On television, Gordon appeared on The Ad-Libbers, Studio One and Robert Montgomery Presents. She also acted in commercials, at one point appearing daily on CBS as she promoted different products. Gordon was the on screen spokeswoman for Crisco and Duncan Hines and did numerous promos for sports and news programs. She was the first woman of many things in her field. In the 1950s, she became the first woman to do network promos, and the first woman announcer for a political convention on network television. She was very active in the Screen Actors Guild (SAG) and became the first woman to lead a local branch of the union when she became president of the New York branch in 1966. She was the first person to wear glasses on television while playing herself, earning her the nickname "The Girl With the Glasses".

Gordon provided English-language voices for actresses who spoke other languages including Jeanne Moreau and Claudia Cardinale, such as for Once Upon a Time in the West. Over a two-year span, she dubbed 32 films that originally had dialog in other languages.

On radio, Gordon portrayed Cherry on Mark Trail and Barbara Miller on the comedy My Son Jeep.

She was also the voice of the Intercept messages for callers hear when dialing a disconnected number, forgetting to dial a 1, and others She is commonly played on Verizon Wireline Exchanges and Ziply Fiber Exchanges (Former Verizon, GTE and Frontier).

== Personal life and death ==
Gordon was married to actor Bernard Grant for more than 50 years, and they had two children, Mark and Melissa. She died on February 28, 2020 at age 90.
