= Women Are Trouble =

1936 film by Errol Taggart

- Directed by: Errol Taggart
- Screenplay by: Michael Fessier
- Story by: George Harmon Coxe
- Produced by: Michael Fessier; Lucien Hubbard
- Starring: Stuart Erwin; Paul Kelly; Florence Rice; Margaret Irving; Cy Kendall; John Harrington
- Cinematography: Oliver T. Marsh
- Edited by: Conrad A. Nervig
- Music by: Score: Edward Ward; Songs: Walter Donaldson (music); Harold Adamson (lyrics)
- Production company: Metro-Goldwyn-Mayer
- Distributed by: Metro-Goldwyn-Mayer
- Release date: July 31, 1936
- Running time: 58 minutes
- Country: United States
- Language: English

Women Are Trouble is a 1936 American crime film directed by Errol Taggart and written by Michael Fessier. The film stars Stuart Erwin, Paul Kelly, Florence Rice, Margaret Irving, Cy Kendall, and John Harrington. The film was released on July 31, 1936, by Metro-Goldwyn-Mayer.

== Cast ==
- Stuart Erwin as Matt Casey
- Paul Kelly as Bill Blaine
- Florence Rice as Ruth Nolan
- Margaret Irving as Frances Blaine
- Cy Kendall as Inspector Matson
- John Harrington as Gleason
- Harold Huber as Pete the Pusher
- Kitty McHugh as Della Murty
- Raymond Hatton as Joe Murty
- George Chandler as Reporter

== Critical reception ==
Lionel Collier, for the British magazine Picturegoer, described the film as "quite an entertaining blend of thrills and comedy, put over by an accomplished cast, and directed in a polished and actionful manner." He provided a positive assessment of the three principal cast members, and wrote, "Stuart Erwin is in good form as a lazy, wisecracking reporter … An excellent study of a sarcastic news editor comes from Paul Kelly, and Florence Rice is intelligent and responsive as the woman reporter. Her performance here puts her in the forefront of comedy artistes."

== See also ==
- Casey, Crime Photographer
