= George Harmon Coxe =

American novelist

- Born: April 23, 1901; Olean, New York, U.S.
- Died: January 31, 1984 (aged 82); Old Lyme, Connecticut, U.S.
- Occupations: Author, writer
- Spouse: Elizabeth Fowler (m. 1929-84; his death)
- Children: 2
- Writing career
- Years active: 1922–1975
- Genre: Crime fiction
- Notable works: Black Mask; Casey, Crime Photographer; Kent Murdock
- Notable awards: Grand Master Award, Mystery Writers of America

George Harmon Coxe (April 23, 1901 – January 31, 1984) was an American writer of crime fiction. He created the series featuring crime scene photographer Jack "Flashgun" Casey, which became a popular radio show airing through to the 1940s.

== Early years ==
Coxe grew up in Olean, New York, where he was born, and Elmira, New York. He graduated from Elmira Free Academy, then attended Cornell and Purdue for one year each and then worked for newspapers in New York, Florida, and California. After working for a printer for five years, he became a full-time writer.

== Overview ==
Coxe started writing around 1922, initially working as a newspaperman and penning stories for nickel-and-dime pulp fiction publications. To maximize his earnings, he originally wrote in many genres, including romance and adventure stories. But he was especially fond of crime fiction and soon made it his specialty. He wrote his first book in 1935.

His series characters in the mystery genre are Jack "Flashgun" Casey, Kent Murdock, Leon Morley, Sam Crombie, Max Hale and Jack Fenner. Casey and Murdock are both detectives and photographers. Coxe wrote a total of 63 novels, the last being published in 1975. He was associated with MGM as a writer.

Married to Elizabeth Fowler in 1929, Coxe had two children.

He was named a Grand Master in 1964 by the Mystery Writers of America. He had been elected the group's national president by acclamation in 1952.

== Novels ==
He wrote a total of 63 novels starting in 1937, the last being published in 1975.

== Periodicals ==
Coxe appeared regularly in the pulp magazine Black Mask from 1934 to 1943.

== Radio and television ==
Coxe's stories formed the basis for Dr. Standish, Medical Examiner, which debuted on CBS radio on July 1, 1948. Gary Merrill starred as Standish, who helped police "in cases involving sudden death under mysterious circumstances". The Standish stories were published in national magazines.

His crime photographer character was featured on radio in the series Casey, Crime Photographer and on television in a series with the same title.

== Motion pictures ==
Three films were made from his stories: Women Are Trouble, starring Stuart Erwin, Paul Kelly and Florence Rice, released in 1936; Murder with Pictures, which starred Lew Ayres and Gail Patrick, also released in 1936; and Here's Flash Casey, starring Eric Linden and Boots Mallory, released in 1938.

== Awards ==
Coxe was the 1964 recipient of the Mystery Writers of America's Grand Master Award.

== See also ==
- List of Casey, Crime Photographer stories in Black Mask
