= Staats Cotsworth =

American radio actor (1908–1979)

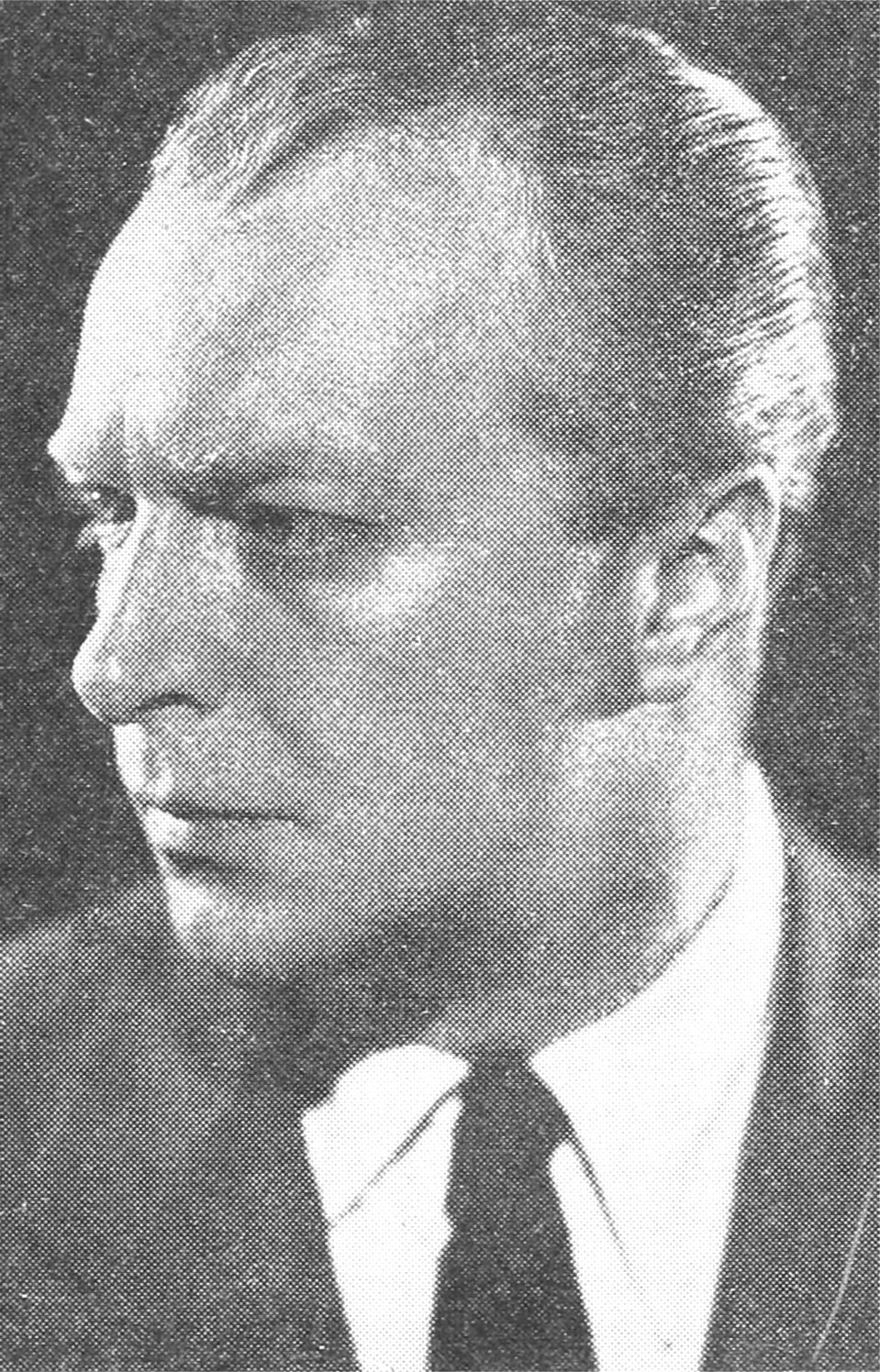
- Cotsworth in 1948
- Born: Staats Cotsworth, Jr. February 17, 1908; Oak Park, Illinois, US
- Died: April 9, 1979 (aged 71); New York City, US
- Occupation: Actor
- Known for: Title role in radio's Casey, Crime Photographer
- Spouse(s): Muriel Kirkland (1936–1968, her death); Josephine Hutchinson (1972–1979, his death)

Staats Cotsworth (February 17, 1908 – April 9, 1979) was an American actor in old-time radio. He is perhaps best known for playing the title role in Casey, Crime Photographer.

== Early years ==
Staats Cotsworth Jr. was born in Oak Park, Illinois, the son of Staats and Dorothy (Bodley) Cotsworth. He had a brother named John Littlefield Cotsworth. In 1929, he earned a diploma in the Department of Art from the Pennsylvania Museum's School of Industrial Art.

== Radio ==
Cotsworth was once described as "the busiest actor in radio," having performed in 7,500 broadcasts in 12 years. His roles as a regular cast member included those shown in the table below.

Program	Role
Amanda of Honeymoon Hill	Edward Leighton
Big Sister	Dr. John Wayne
Casey, Crime Photographer	Jack "Flashgun" Casey
Front Page Farrell	David Farrell
Inspector Thorne	Thorne
Lone Journey	Wolfe Bennett
Ma Perkins	Gideon Harris
Mark Trail	Mark Trail
Mr. and Mrs. North	Lieutenant Weigand
Pepper Young's Family	Jeff Taylor
Roger Kilgore, Public Defender	District Attorney Sam Howe
The Man from G-2	Major Hugh North
When a Girl Marries	Phil Stanley

Other programs on which Cotsworth appeared included The Chase, These Are Our Men, X Minus One, Mr. Keen, Tracer of Lost Persons, The Right to Happiness, Cavalcade of America, Grand Central Station, The Story of Mary Marlin, and Silver Theater.

== Stage ==
Cotsworth's professional debut on stage was in Alice in Wonderland, produced by Eva LeGallienne. His Broadway credits include First Episode (1934), Othello (1935), Macbeth (1935 and 1941–1942), Damaged Goods (1937), As You Like It (1937), Stop-Over (1938), Madame Capet (1938), Boudoir (1941), She Stoops to Conquer (1949–1950), Richard III (1953), Inherit the Wind (1955–1957), Pictures in the Hallway (1956), I Knock at the Door (1957), Advise and Consent (1960–1961), The Right Honourable Gentleman (1965–1966), Weekend (1968), A Patriot for Me (1969), and Lost in the Stars (1972).

== Television ==
Cotsworth was seen in Killer's Choice, the premiere episode of Kraft Mystery Theatre, in June 1958, and in "The Thirty-first of February'", an episode of The Alfred Hitchcock Hour, in January 1963. He was in Macbeth when that play was presented on Hallmark Hall of Fame.

== Art ==
Cotsworth was also an artist. "He attended several art schools in this country and studied for seven years in Paris," at the Académie Colarossi. His work included illustrating Ernest Peixotto's book, A Bacchic Pilgrimage, published by Charles Scribner's Sons and painting "three murals for some swank bowling alleys in Washington." His work was exhibited at the Corcoran Gallery of Art in Washington and at the Pennsylvania Academy of the Fine Arts and the Water Color Club in Philadelphia.

A newspaper obituary described Cotsworth as "an accomplished painter of oils and watercolors," noting that at the time of his death he was "listed in the current Who's Who in American Art."

== Union activities ==
Cotsworth was elected a member of the New York Local Board of the American Federation of Radio Artists in 1946 and in 1949.

== Personal life ==
Cotsworth married Muriel Kirkland, an actress, in New York City on May 24, 1936. They remained married until her death in 1968. Later he married Josephine Hutchinson, who was also an actress. He was an Episcopalian and served as president of the Episcopal Actors Guild from 1968 to 1971.

== Death ==
Cotsworth died April 9, 1979, aged 71, in his apartment in Manhattan, New York. He was survived by his second wife Josephine.

== Filmography ==
Year	Title	Role	Notes
1957	That Night!	Salesman	
1957	Peyton Place	Charles Partridge	
1963	The Alfred Hitchcock Hour	Vincent	Season 1 Episode 15: "The Thirty-First of February"
1964	Hamlet	Polonius	
1971	They Might Be Giants	Winthrop	
1972	Silent Night, Bloody Night	Wilfred Butler	Voice, (final film role)
