= Matt Crowley =

American actor (1905–1983)

- Publicity Photo of Matt Crowley
- Born: June 20, 1905; New Haven, Connecticut, US
- Died: March 7, 1983 (aged 77); Clearwater, Florida, US
- Occupation: Actor

Matt Crowley (June 20, 1905 – March 7, 1983) was an American film, television and radio actor.

== Life and career ==
Matt Crowley was born in New Haven, Connecticut. He was a student of George Pierce Baker at Yale University.

As an actor, Crowley had a career in radio before he moved into films, where he was best known for his roles in The Mob (1951), The Edge of Night (1956), and April Love (1957).

He died on March 7, 1983, in Clearwater, Florida, US.

== Work ==
=== Partial filmography ===
- The Mob (1951)
- The Edge of Night (1956)
- April Love (1957)

=== Television ===
- Naked City (1958–63)
- Car 54, Where Are You?

=== Radio ===
- Buck Rogers in the 25th Century in the title role
- Pretty Kitty Kelly as narrator (1940s)
- Casey, Crime Photographer as Jack Casey (1930s-50s)
- Dick Tracy as Dick Tracy
- John's Other Wife as John Perry. (1936–42)
- Jungle Jim as Jungle Jim Bradley (1935–38)
- Keeping Up with Wigglesworth as the announcer (1945)
- Mark Trail as Mark Trail (1950–53)
- Myrt and Marge as Anthony Link (1931–47)
- The Adventures of Superman as Batman and Inspector Henderson (1940–51)
- Perry Mason as Paul Drake (1943–55)
- Pretty Kitty Kelly as announcer and narrator (1937–46)
- The Road of Life as Dr. Jim Brent (1937–59)
