= Bernard Grant =

American actor (1920–2004)

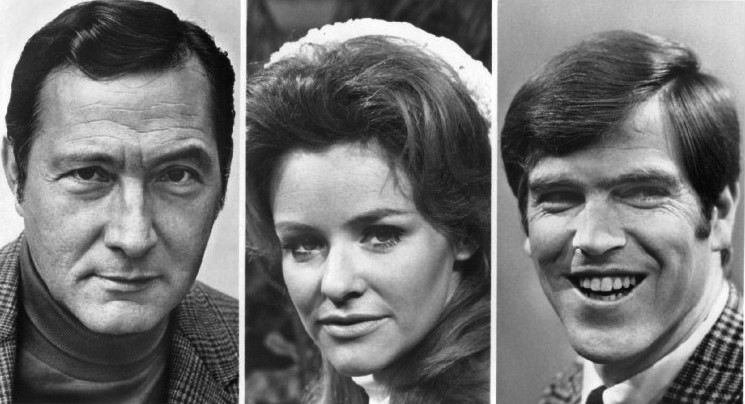
- Bernard Grant (left) as Steve Burke in One Life to Live, c. 1973
- Born: October 10, 1920; The Bronx, New York City, U.S.
- Died: June 30, 2004 (aged 83); Manhattan, New York City, U.S.
- Other names: Bernie Grant
- Occupation: Actor
- Years active: 1960–1996
- Spouse: Joyce Gordon
- Children: 1 son, 1 daughter

Bernard Grant (October 10, 1920 – June 30, 2004) was an American actor.

Grant was born in New York City, New York, in The Bronx. He served in the United States Army during World War II. Grant also went to the City College of New York. Active in soap operas such as The Guiding Light and One Life to Live, he was the regular English voice of Marcello Mastroianni and Gian Maria Volonté (dubbing over him in A Fistful of Dollars, For a Few Dollars More, Bandits in Milan and A Bullet for the General). He also dubbed Captain Clinton (Aldo Giuffrè) in The Good, the Bad and the Ugly and Valmont (Adolfo Celi) in Danger: Diabolik.
