= Jan Miner =

American actress (1917–2004)

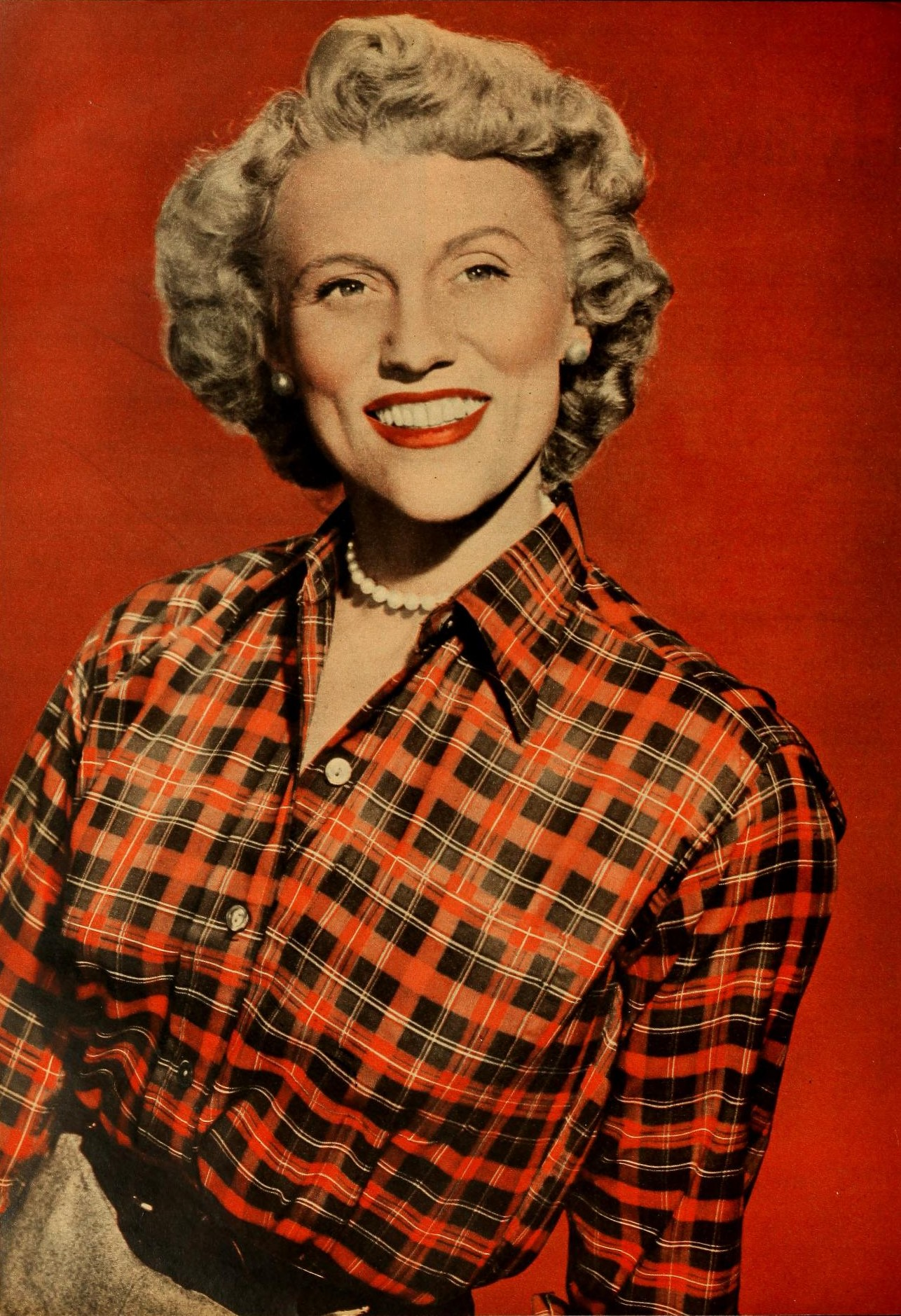
- Miner in 1953
- Born: Janice Miner; October 15, 1917; Boston, Massachusetts, U.S.
- Died: February 15, 2004 (aged 86); Bethel, Connecticut, U.S.
- Occupations: Radio, television, film and stage actress
- Years active: 1944–2004
- Spouse: Richard Merrell (m. 1963–1998) (his death)

Janice Miner (October 15, 1917 – February 15, 2004) was an American actress best known as the character Madge the manicurist in Palmolive dish-washing detergent television commercials from the 1960s to the 1990s.

== Biography ==
=== Early life and career ===
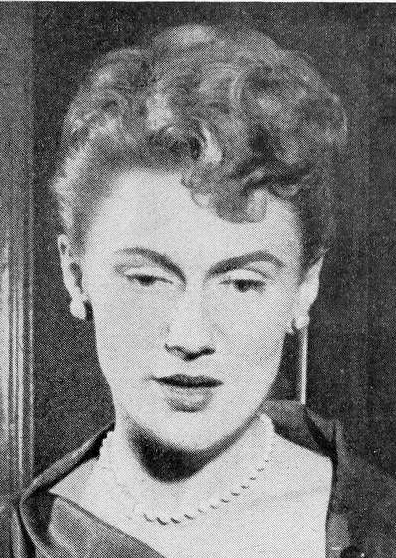
Miner in Hilltop House (1953)

Janice Miner was the daughter of a dentist and a painter, and had three brothers, Sheldon, Donald and Lyndsey. She studied at the Vesper George School of Art in her native Boston, then studied acting under Lee Strasberg and others. She made her stage debut in 1945 in a Boston production of Elmer Rice's Street Scene.

Miner then became established on radio, and worked through the 1950s in several series simultaneously. Among other roles, she was one of three actresses who played secretary Della Street on Perry Mason and one of five to play girlfriend Ann Williams on Casey, Crime Photographer. She also appeared as Mary Wesley on Boston Blackie.

Miner played featured roles in the anthology series Radio City Playhouse, in "Soundless", "Portrait of Lenore" and other episodes. Her appearance in the premiere broadcast of the series "created a minor sensation in the play Long Distance"; the episode proved so popular that she repeated her performance later in the season.

From circa 1948 through some time before the series ended in 1957, Miner starred as Julie Erickson, head of the titular orphanage in the soap opera Hilltop House, during most of the show's revival beginning in 1948. The series was sponsored by the Colgate-Palmolive Company, for which she later appeared in a famous, long-running series of television commercials.

=== Broadway career ===
As radio drama faded with the popularity of television, Miner turned to the theater and made her New York City debut in the 1958 melodrama Obbligato at Theatre Marquee, adapted by Jane Hinton Gates from the novel Une Ombre by Paul Vialar; Miner starred as a spinster in romantic competition with her younger sister, played by Carol Vandermeir. In 1960 she made her Broadway debut in Viva Madison Avenue!, a comedy about the advertising world by George Panetta, at the Longacre Theatre.

=== Television icon ===
Miner as Madge, the manicurist in the Palmolive commercials

Miner appeared on television in several shows, among them Boston Blackie and Casey, Crime Photographer, in roles she originated on radio. She became an icon to TV viewers as Madge, the wisecracking manicurist in commercials for Palmolive dish-washing detergent. In an advertising campaign created by the agency Ted Bates Advertising, Madge worked at the Salon East Beauty Parlor and soaked her customers’ fingernails in Palmolive ("Palmolive softens hands while you do the dishes"). The campaign ran from 1966 to 1992.

Miner's Palmolive commercials appeared in other countries, where Madge was often given a different name. In France she was called Françoise; in Germany, Switzerland, and Austria she was known as Tilly; in Finland as Marissa; and in Denmark as Sylvia. In Australia and New Zealand, Madge was played by Robina Beard. Madge's trademark line, "You're soaking in it," became one of the more famous and parodied television commercial quotes.

Miner was a regular on the 1974 CBS situation comedy Paul Sand in Friends and Lovers in which she played the mother of the character portrayed by Paul Sand.

=== Theater and film career ===
Following her 1960 debut, Miner appeared on Broadway in The Milk Train Doesn't Stop Here Anymore (1963) and Butterflies Are Free (1972) (in each as an understudy); the 1973 revival of The Women; the 1976 revival of The Heiress with Jane Alexander; the 1980 revival of Watch on the Rhine, by Lillian Hellman; the 1983–1984 Circle in the Square Theatre revival of Heartbreak House, with Rex Harrison, Philip Bosco, Rosemary Harris, Amy Irving, Dana Ivey, and Stephen McHattie; and the Franco Zeffirelli productions of Terrence McNally's adaptation of The Lady of the Camellias (1963) and Eduardo De Filippo's Saturday Sunday Monday (1974).

She also appeared in Shakespeare on Broadway, as Emilia in the American National Theater and Academy production of Othello (1970), starring Moses Gunn; and as Juliet's nurse in director Theodore Mann's Circle in the Square production of Romeo and Juliet (1977). Other theater work included Major Barbara.

In 1986, Miner appeared at the off-Broadway Lucille Lortel Theatre as Gertrude Stein in the play Gertrude Stein and a Companion, by Win Wells, with Marian Seldes as Alice B. Toklas. Miner and Seldes reprised the roles in a June 1987 television version for Bravo. Miner also appeared for six seasons in repertory roles at the American Shakespeare Festival in Stratford, Connecticut.

Miner played Lenny Bruce's mother, Sally Marr, in the Bob Fosse film Lenny (1974) with Dustin Hoffman as Lenny Bruce and Valerie Perrine as Honey Bruce. She also appeared in The Swimmer (1968), Willie & Phil (1980), Endless Love (1981), and as the Mother Superior in Mermaids (1990). Her latter-day work in television included an episode of Law & Order.

== Personal life ==
Miner was married to actor and writer Richard Merrell (1925–1998) from 1963 until his death from heart failure at age 73, on September 13, 1998. The two often appeared together onstage, including in The Gin Game at the Missouri Repertory Theater, (later renamed the Kansas City Repertory Theatre), as well as in Night Must Fall, High Spirits, and what Miner called their favorite play together, Eugene O'Neill's Long Day's Journey Into Night at the Byrdcliffe Theater in Woodstock, New York.

Miner adopted a daughter named Molly Rose in the early 1960s. She resided in Southbury, Connecticut in her later years, and died at the Bethel Health Care Facility in Bethel, Connecticut, after several years of failing health. She was cremated.

== Filmography ==
=== Film ===
Year	Title	Role	Notes
1968	The Swimmer	Lillian Hunsacker	
1974	Lenny	Sally Marr	
1980	Willie & Phil	Maria Kaufman	
1981	Endless Love	Mrs. Switzer	
1990	Mermaids	Mother Superior	

=== Television ===
Year	Title	Role	Notes
1949	Lights Out	Mrs. Leon Jackson	Episode: "Long Distance"
1955	Studio One in Hollywood	Mother	Episode: "Julie"
1959	One Step Beyond	Grace Harkness	Episode: "The Inheritance"
1959	Deadline	Alma/Mrs. Landley	2 episodes
1963-1964	The Defenders	Mrs. Thomas/Mrs. Berger	2 episodes
1967	N.Y.P.D.	Mrs. Matthews	Episode: "To Catch a Hero"
1969	The Jackie Gleason Show	Stella the Makeup Lady	Episode: "The Honeymooners: The Honeymoon Is Over"
1974	Paul Sand in Friends and Lovers	Marge Dreyfuss	4 episodes
1978	One Day at a Time	Rose Stegemuller	Episode: "The New Owner"
1983	Cagney & Lacey	Stella Wall	Episode: "Hopes and Dreams"
1985	Great Performances	Nurse Guinness	Episode: Heartbreak House
1987	Gertrude Stein and a Companion!	Gertrude Stein	TV movie
1990	ABC Afterschool Special	Mrs. Abbott	Episode: "Stood Up"
1994	Law & Order	Edna Hodge	Episode: "Golden Years"
1997	Remember WENN	Aunt Agatha	Episode: "Scott Sherwood of the F.B.I."
