= Ken Terrell =

American actor (1904–1966)

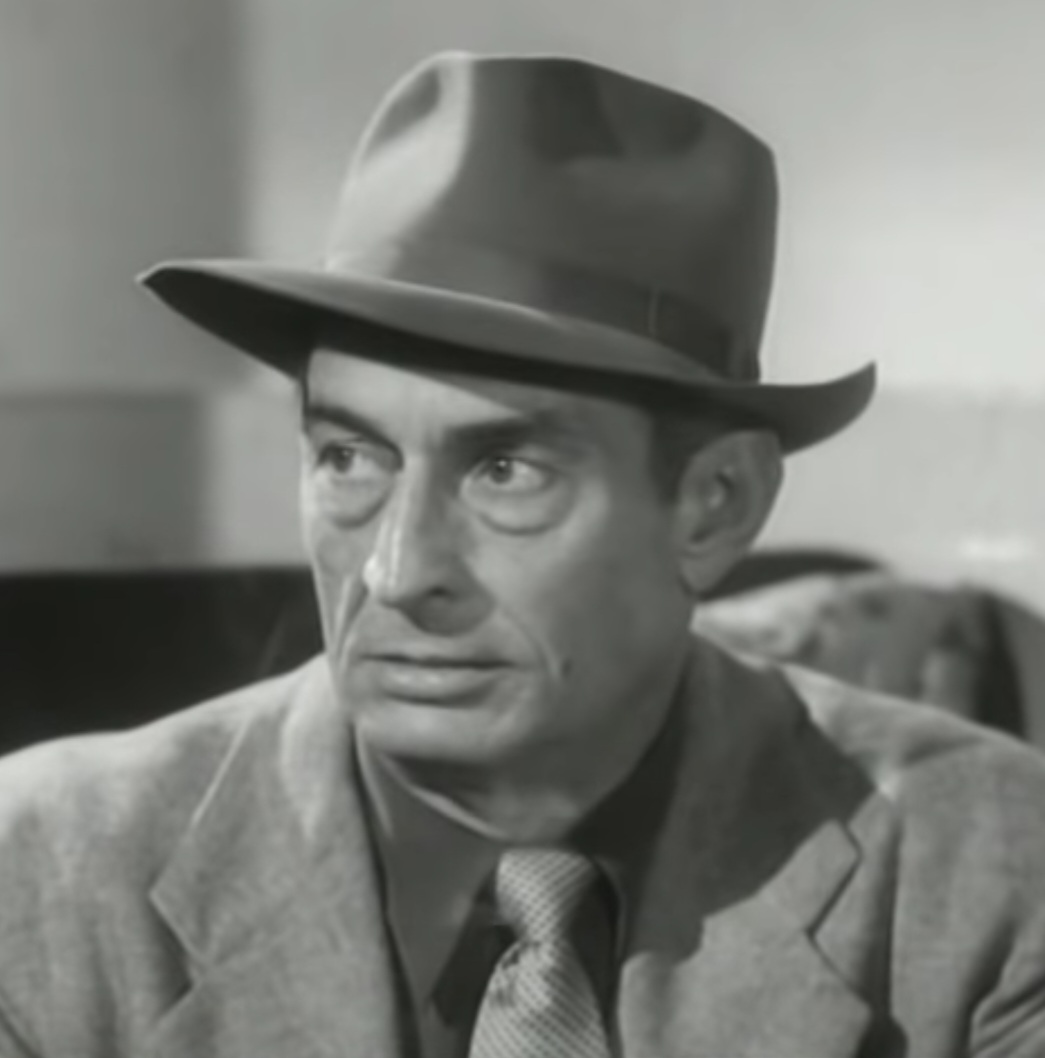
- Terrell in Indestructible Man (1956)
- Born: Kenneth Jones Terrell; April 29, 1904; Coolidge, Georgia, U.S.
- Died: March 8, 1966 (aged 61); Sherman Oaks, California, U.S.
- Resting place: Oakwood Memorial Park Cemetery
- Occupations: Actor; Stuntman
- Years active: 1936–1962

Kenneth Jones Terrell (April 29, 1904 – March 8, 1966) was an American western and action film actor and stuntman best known for playing Joe Marcelli in the 1956 film Indestructible Man and Jess in the 1958 film Attack of the 50 Foot Woman.

== Biography ==
Born in the small town of Coolidge, Georgia, Terrell attended Georgia Tech in Atlanta. As a young man, he took up bodybuilding and developed the athletic skills that helped him become a Hollywood stuntman. His roles in action films were usually minor, and sometimes he did stunt work and acting in the same film.

Terrell did only limited stunt work after a foot injury in the late 1950s. He died from arteriosclerosis at the age of 61. He was interred at Oakwood Memorial Park Cemetery in Chatsworth, California.

== Filmography ==
Films
Year	Title	Role	Notes
1936	The King Steps Out	Strong Man	Uncredited
1937	Conquest	Minor Role	Uncredited
1937	Living on Love	Ghonoff Brother	credited as Kenneth Terrell
1937	A Damsel in Distress	Drunk	Uncredited
1939	Daredevils of the Red Circle	Gas Plant Thug	Serial, Uncredited
1939	Dick Tracy's G-Men	Ed	Serial
1939	The Night of Nights	2nd Acrobat	Uncredited
1939	Zorro's Fighting Legion	Martin / Cristobal - Dungeon Guard	Serial, [Ch. 4] / [Ch. 7], Uncredited
1940	Drums of Fu Manchu	Shanghai St. / Wax Museum Dacoit 18	Serial, [Chs. 1, 5], Uncredited
1940	Covered Wagon Days	Henchman	Uncredited
1940	Adventures of Red Ryder	Henchman Bart Wade	Serial, [Chs. 1, 3–5, 9, 12], Uncredited
1940	Winners of the West	Indian	Serial, Uncredited
1940	Oklahoma Renegades	Carter Cowhand	Uncredited
1940	King of the Royal Mounted	Henchman Al	Serial, [Chs. 1, 3-5], Uncredited
1940	The Mummy's Hand	Egyptian Thug	Uncredited
1940	Under Texas Skies	Jeff	Uncredited
1940	Mysterious Doctor Satan	Corwin	Serial
1941	Adventures of Captain Marvel	Hawks - Bentley's Butler	Serial, [Ch. 6], Uncredited
1941	Sky Raiders	Henchman	Serial, Uncredited
1941	The Spider Returns	Henchman	Serial, Uncredited
1941	In the Navy	Brawler in Dance Hall	Uncredited
1941	Jungle Girl	Mananga	Serial
1941	Six-Gun Gold	Jim	Uncredited
1941	Sailors on Leave	Sailor	Uncredited
1941	King of the Texas Rangers	Scaffold Thug	Serial, (Ch. 6) Uncredited
1941	Dick Tracy vs. Crime, Inc.	Plant Heavy 4	Serial, Uncredited
1942	Don Winslow of the Navy	Sam Munn / Rocky- Henchman	Serial, Uncredited
1942	Call Out the Marines	Brawler	Uncredited
1942	Cowboy Serenade	Henchman	Uncredited
1942	Raiders of the Range	Henchman	Uncredited
1942	Spy Smashe	Second HQ Sentry / Third Warehouse Cop / Raygun Thug	Serial, [Ch. 1] / [Ch. 6] / [Ch. 7], Uncredited
1942	Syncopation	Gangster	Uncredited
1942	The Falcon Takes Over	Headwaiter	Uncredited
1942	Perils of Nyoka	Ahmed - Arab Henchman	Serial
1942	King of the Mounties	Al	Serial, Uncredited
1942	Outlaws of Pine Ridge	Henchman Blake	Uncredited
1943	G-Men vs. the Black Dragon	Garage Thug / Yacht Thug / Explosives Thug / Warehouse Thug	Serial, Uncredited
1943	Daredevils of the West	Bartender	Serial, (Ch. 3, 11), Uncredited
1943	Days of Old Cheyenne	Henchman	Uncredited
1943	Bordertown Gun Fighters	Train Rowdy	Uncredited
1943	Secret Service in Darkest Africa	Fireman 1 / Ahmed Ali / Workshop Arab / Warehouse Arab / Rokan / Sheik's Guard / Lobby Heavy 1 / Residence Guard	Serial, [Ch. 1] / [Chs. 3-4] / [Ch.8] / [Ch.9] / [Ch. 10-11] / [Ch.12] / [Ch. 14] / [Ch. 15], Uncredited
1943	The Masked Marvel	Launch Thug / Bridge Thug #1 / Super-X Warehouse Thug #2	Serial, Uncredited
1943	The Man from the Rio Grande	Trask - Croupier	Uncredited
1944	Captain America	Dodge Bldg. Thug / Gang Sharpshooter / Phony Humane Society Driver	Serial, [Chs. 1-2] / [Ch. 6] / [Ch. 10], Uncredited
1944	Tucson Raiders	Saloon Henchman	Serial, Uncredited
1944	The Tiger Woman	Bolton - Thug / Depot Thug / Oil Truck Driver	Serial, [Ch. 1] / [Ch. 4, 9] / [Ch. 11]
1944	Marshal of Reno	Mustang Saloon Waiter	Uncredited
1944	Haunted Harbor	Taola, Tobacco Peddler / Sailor	Serial, [Ch. 7] / [Chs. 13-14], Uncredited
1944	Code of the Prairie	Brawling Henchman	Uncredited
1944	Girl Rush	Henchman Reporting to Barlan	Uncredited
1944	Zorro's Black Whip	Herald Heavy / Mine Heavy #1	Serial, Uncredited
1944	Song of the Range	Henchman Sanborn	Uncredited
1944	Winged Victory	Minor Role	Uncredited
1944	Destiny	Radio Patrolman	Uncredited
1945	The Master Key	Henchman	Serial, Uncredited
1945	In Old New Mexico	Deputy	Uncredited
1945	The Missing Corpse	Arresting Officer	Uncredited
1945	Federal Operator 99	Norton Corby	Serial, Uncredited
1945	Trail of Kit Carson	Anderson	Uncredited
1945	Secret Agent X-9	'Lorelei' Sailor	Serial, Uncredited
1945	The Purple Monster Strikes	Andy Martin	Serial, [Ch. 8]
1945	Her Highness and the Bellboy	Brawler	Uncredited
1945	Marshal of Laredo	Henchman	Uncredited
1946	Tarzan and the Leopard Woman	Leopard Man	Uncredited
1946	Detour to Danger	Joe	
1946	The People's Choice	2nd Bank Robber	
1946	King of the Forest Rangers	Naylor - Lumber Mill Henchman	Serial, [Ch. 9], Uncredited
1946	Daughter of Don Q	Slick Sam Sloan - aka Channing	Serial, Uncredited
1946	The Crimson Ghost	Warehouse Thug	Serial, [Chs.10-11], Uncredited
1946	The Secret of the Whistler	Detective	Uncredited
1946	Out California Way	Movie Scene Sheriff	Uncredited
1947	Son of Zorro	George Thomas / Pancho	doubling Stanley Price
1947	Jack Armstrong	Tabori	Serial, Uncredited
1947	Angel and the Badman	Brawl Spectator	Uncredited
1947	Vigilantes of Boomtown	Guest-Fighter at Governor's Meeting	Uncredited
1947	Apache Rose	Sniper	Uncredited
1947	Jesse James Rides Again	2nd Riverboat Engineer-Thug	Serial, Uncredited
1947	The Black Widow	Mendoza	Serial, Uncredited
1948	The Gay Ranchero	Henchman Roberts	
1948	G-Men Never Forget	Kelsey (Thug) / Joe (Camera Thug) / Henchman Joe	Serial, [Ch. 1] / [Ch. 6]
1948	The Miracle of the Bells	Miner	Uncredited
1948	Are You with It?	Stair Accident	Uncredited
1948	The Bold Frontiersman	Judd - Bartender	
1948	Dangers of the Canadian Mounted	Art / Curry / Fenton / Grady / Masters / Guard / Tom	Serial, Uncredited
1948	The Iron Curtain	Spy on Trial	Uncredited
1948	The Timber Trail	Henchman	Uncredited
1948	Good Sam	Moving Man	Uncredited
1948	Adventures of Frank and Jesse James	Water Tower Henchman	Serial, [Ch. 12], Uncredited
1948	The Plunderers	Indian	Uncredited
1948	Grand Canyon Trail	Mike Delaney - Regan Henchman	
1949	Federal Agents vs. Underworld, Inc	Museum Thug	Serial, [Ch. 6], Uncredited
1949	The Clay Pigeon	Davis - Driver Henchman	Uncredited
1949	Ghost of Zorro	Henchman	Serial, Uncredited
1949	The Window	Man	Uncredited
1949	The James Brothers of Missouri	Stark / Trent	Serial, Uncredited
1949	Radar Patrol vs. Spy King	Tami, the Mechanic	Serial, [Chs. 2, 10], Uncredited
1949	A Dangerous Profession	Man	Uncredited
1950	Bells of Coronado	Henchman	Uncredited
1950	Killer Shark	Barroom Tough In Black	Uncredited
1950	Comanche Territory	Brawler in Saloon	Uncredited
1950	The Invisible Monster	Kern - Henchman	Serial, [Chs. 8-9], Uncredited
1950	Flying Disc Man from Mars	Graves, Mechanic	Serial, [Ch. 3], Uncredited
1950	Watch the Birdie	Construction Guard	Uncredited
1950	Trail of Robin Hood	Henchman	Uncredited
1950	Hunt the Man Down	Paper Bag Hold-up Man	Uncredited
1951	I Was a Communist for the FBI	Communist Goon Agitator	Uncredited
1951	Secrets of Monte Carlo	Renault	Uncredited
1951	The Prince Who Was a Thief		Uncredited
1951	The Mark of the Renegade	Ranchhand	Uncredited
1951	His Kind of Woman	Gunman	Uncredited
1951	Roadblock	Patrolman	Uncredited
1951	Pals of the Golden West	Henchman Tony	
1951	On Dangerous Ground	Crook	Uncredited
1952	Radar Men from the Moon	Stock Footage Henchman	Serial, Uncredited
1952	Meet Danny Wilson	Driscoll's Henchman	Uncredited
1952	Lydia Bailey	Barbe	Uncredited
1952	Scarlet Angel	Bartender in Brawl	Uncredited
1952	Cripple Creek	Saloon Brawler	Uncredited
1952	Zombies of the Stratosphere	Henchman	Serial, Uncredited
1952	Captain Pirate	Knife-Wielding Pirate of Esterling	Uncredited
1952	Last Train from Bombay	Ceylonese Assassin	
1952	Assignment – Paris!	Military Aide	Uncredited
1952	The Pathfinder	Indian	Uncredited
1953	Sword of Venus	Coachman	Uncredited
1953	Old Overland Trail	Lone Feather	Uncredited
1953	Jeopardy	Officer at 2nd Barricade	Uncredited
1953	Desert Legion	Arab	Uncredited
1953	Port Sinister	Hollis	
1953	Ma and Pa Kettle on Vacation	Cab Driver	Uncredited
1953	Iron Mountain Trail	Bartender Tim	Uncredited
1953	Abbott and Costello Meet Dr. Jekyll and Mr. Hyde	Second Heckler in Park	Uncredited
1953	Red River Shore	Henchman	Uncredited
1954	Trader Tom of the China Seas	Capt. Gaines' Crewman	Serial, Uncredited
1954	Ma and Pa Kettle at Home	Indian	Uncredited
1954	Captain Kidd and the Slave Girl	Pirate	Uncredited
1954	Return to Treasure Island	Thompson	
1954	The Raid	Confederate Soldier with Moneybags	Uncredited
1955	Son of Sinbad	Tartar Killed on Cliff	Uncredited
1955	Finger Man	Sears - Truck Driver	Uncredited
1955	The Last Command	Alamo Defender	Uncredited
1956	The Conqueror	Sorgan - Mongol Warrior	Uncredited
1956	The Price of Fear	Emilio Ferranti	Uncredited
1956	Indestructible Man	Joe Marcelli	
1956	The Proud Ones	The Weasel	Uncredited
1956	Congo Crossing	McLeod	Uncredited
1956	A Strange Adventure	Armored Car Guard	Uncredited
1956	The Ten Commandments	Amalekite	Uncredited
1956	Reprisal!	Lyncher	Uncredited
1957	The Daughter of Dr. Jekyll		
1957	Portland Exposé	Henchman	Uncredited
1957	Man of a Thousand Faces	Reporter at Chaney's House	Uncredited
1957	Short Cut to Hell	Joseph--Butler	Uncredited
1957	The Brain from Planet Arous	Colonel in Conference Room	
1957	Sabu and the Magic Ring	Wazir's Guard	Uncredited
1958	Attack of the 50 Foot Woman	Jess Stout	
1958	Once Upon a Horse...	Old-Timer in Saloon Fight	Uncredited
1958	The Buccaneer	Pirate #6	
1959	The Big Fisherman	Centurion on Horseback	Uncredited
1959	Pier 5, Havana	Man #2	Uncredited
1960	Elmer Gantry	Blind Man	Uncredited
1960	Spartacus	Minor Role	Uncredited
1961	Master of the World	Shanks	Uncredited
1962	How the West Was Won	River Pirate	Uncredited, (final film role)

Television
Year	Title	Role	Notes
1950	The Lone Ranger	Constable	Uncredited, Episode: "Outlaw Town"
1954	Fireside Theatre		Episode: "Member of the Jury", credited as Kenneth Terrell
1954	The Cisco Kid	Paul Blackwell	Episode: "The Lowest Bidder"
1954	The Hospital	Jason Turnbull	
1955	Cisco and the Giant	Henchman Lobo	
1957	Dragnet		Episode: "The Big Cup", credited as Kenneth Terrell
1957	Cheyenne	Long Bow	Episode: "Hard Bargain"
1957	Zorro	Lancer	Uncredited, Episode: "Garcia's Secret Mission"
1959	Maverick	Blackie Dolan	Uncredited, Episode: "The Saga of Waco Williams"
1959	Lassie	Thief	Episode: "Swami"
