= John Crawford (actor) =

American actor (1920–2010)

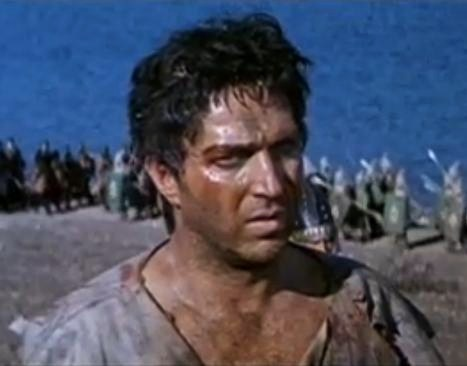
- Screenshot of John Crawford from the trailer for 1962's The 300 Spartans
- Born: Cleve Allen Richardson; September 13, 1920; Colfax, Washington, U.S.
- Died: September 21, 2010 (aged 90); Newbury Park, California, U.S.
- Occupation: Actor
- Years active: 1944–1989
- Spouses: Lorraine Crawford (m. 1945; div. 1953) Anne Wakefield (m. 1956; div. 1966) Nancy D. Jeris (m. 1968; div. 1974): Beverly Long (m. 1976; div. ?)
- Children: 3

John Crawford (born Cleve Allen Richardson; September 13, 1920 – September 21, 2010) was an American actor. He appeared in a 1961 episode of The Twilight Zone, called "A Hundred Yards Over the Rim", and in several Gunsmoke episodes. He had a key role in the 1975 film Night Moves, a crime thriller starring Gene Hackman. He also played the mayor of San Francisco in 1976's The Enforcer, the third Dirty Harry film featuring Clint Eastwood, and in producer-director Irwin Allen's classic disaster films, 1972's The Poseidon Adventure and 1974's The Towering Inferno, as the ill-fated Chief Engineer, and as Callahan, the head chief of building utilities in the Glass Tower, respectively.

== Life and career ==
Crawford was born in Colfax, Washington, and studied at the School of Drama at the University of Washington. In films from the 1940s, Crawford appeared in bit parts for many years before playing leads in several films in the United Kingdom in the late 1950s and early 1960s, including the lead antagonist in Hammer's noir film Hell Is a City opposite Stanley Baker.

In 1960 in the UK, he appeared in Danger Man in the episode entitled "The Girl in the Pink Pajamas" as Dr. Keller.

When he returned to the United States, he played supporting roles in several films but was more prolific on TV in character roles, in scores of series such as State Trooper (in the episode "The Last Stage Robbery"), Gunsmoke (14 episodes between 1959 and 1974), The Twilight Zone, Combat!, The Fugitive, Harry O, Voyage to the Bottom of the Sea, Wheels, The Dukes of Hazzard, The Incredible Hulk, The Time Tunnel, Mannix, Lost in Space, Star Trek, Mission: Impossible, Hogan's Heroes, The Rockford Files and most notably as Sheriff Ep Bridges on CBS' The Waltons.

Crawford co-wrote the screenplay of the film The Ballad of Cable Hogue (1970), directed by Sam Peckinpah. In addition to appearing with James Arness in 14 episodes of Gunsmoke, he was in two episodes of Arness' subsequent western series How the West Was Won (1976–79) and in two episodes of Arness' subsequent police detective series McClain's Law (1981–1982).

His other notable silver screen turns include the investigating State Trooper in I Saw What You Did (1965), the Chief Engineer in The Poseidon Adventure (1972), Callahan in The Towering Inferno (1974), and as Brian Deering in The Boogens (1981).

== Death ==
Crawford died from a stroke eight days past his 90th birthday. According to Variety, he died in Newbury Park, California and was survived by his longtime companion and former wife, Ann Wakefield.

== Selected filmography ==
Year	Title	Role	Notes
1944	Thoroughbreds		Uncredited
1945	The Phantom of 42nd Street	John Carraby	
1946	Without Reservations	Soldier	Uncredited
1946	The Time of Their Lives	Dandy at Party	Uncredited
1948	G-Men Never Forget	Duke, Dictaphone Boobytrap Thug	Serial; Ch. 5; Uncredited
1948	Dangers of the Canadian Mounted	Danton, Henchman	
1948	Sons of Adventure	George Norton, Cameraman	
1948	Adventures of Frank and Jesse James	Amos Ramsey	
1949	Ghost of Zorro	Mulvaney	Serial; Ch. 3, 4
1949	The James Brothers of Missouri	Mr. Carson	Uncredited
1949	Radar Patrol vs. Spy King	Sands	Serial; Chs. 7-8
1950	Chain Lightning	Radio Operator	Uncredited
1950	The Invisible Monster	Harris	
1950	The Asphalt Jungle	Reporter	Uncredited
1950	Mystery Street	Reporter	Uncredited
1950	Lonely Heart Bandits	Stevedore	
1950	Union Station	Hackett	Uncredited
1950	A Life of Her Own	Photographer	Uncredited
1950	Right Cross	Photographer	Uncredited
1950	Cyrano de Bergerac	Cadet	
1951	Cuban Fireball	Photographer	Uncredited
1951	Raton Pass	Sam	
1951	I Was a Communist for the FBI	FBI Agent McGowan	Uncredited
1951	Hollywood Story	1st Detective	Uncredited
1951	Show Boat	Hotel Clerk	Uncredited
1951	The Red Badge of Courage	Soldier	Uncredited
1951	Honeychile	Marvin McKay	
1951	Man in the Saddle	Isham Rider	Uncredited
1951	Northwest Territory	LeBeau	
1952	The Greatest Show on Earth	Jack, Circus Attendant	Uncredited
1952	Scaramouche	Vignon	Uncredited
1952	Actor's and Sin	Movie Hero	Segment "Woman of Sin"
1952	Zombies of the Stratosphere	Roth	
1952	Blackhawk: Fearless Champion of Freedom	Chuck	
1952	Old Oklahoma Plains	Chuck Ramsey	
1952	The Ring	Cop in Diner	Uncredited
1952	Son of Geronimo: Apache Avenger	Ace Devlin	Serial; Chs. 1-9
1952	Invasion U.S.A.	Man in Bar	Uncredited
1952	Stop, You're Killing Me	State Trooper	Uncredited
1953	Star of Texas	Texas Ranger Stockton	
1953	Marshal of Cedar Rock	Chris Peters, Henchman	
1953	Salome	Guard	Uncredited
1953	Serpent of the Nile	Captain Domitius	
1953	Rebel City	Joe Spencer	
1953	Mission Over Korea	Tech Sergeant	Uncredited
1953	Conquest of Cochise	Capt. Bill	Uncredited
1953	The Great Adventures of Captain Kidd	Capt. Kidd	Chs. 1-13
1953	The Big Heat	Al, Bannion's Brother-in-Law	Uncredited
1953	Slaves of Babylon	Avil, Belshazzar's Chief Soldier	
1953	Prisoners of the Casbah	Guard	Uncredited
1953	Three Sailors and a Girl	Shore Patrolman	Uncredited
1953	Man Crazy	Farmer	
1954	Trader Tom of the China Seas	Bill Gaines	
1954	The Battle of Rogue River	Capt. Richard Hillman	
1954	Jesse James vs. the Daltons	Gang Member	Uncredited
1954	Captain Kidd and the Slave Girl	Bonnett	
1958	The Key	American Captain	
1958	Blind Spot	Doctor	
1958	Orders to Kill	Maj. Kimball	
1958	Intent to Kill	Boyd	
1958	Floods of Fear	Jack Murphy	
1959	John Paul Jones	George Washington	
1959	Solomon and Sheba	Joab	
1960	Hell Is a City	Don Starling	
1960	I Aim at the Stars	Dr. Bosco	White Sands, New Mexico
1960	Piccadilly Third Stop	Joe Preedy	
1960	The Man Who Was Nobody	South Africa Smith	
1960	Exodus	Captain Hank Schlosberg	
1961	The Impersonator	Sgt. Jimmy Bradford	
1961	The Long Shadow	Kelly	
1962	The 300 Spartans	Agathon the Spartan Spy	
1962	The Longest Day	Col. Caffey	Uncredited
1963	Come Fly with Me	Co-Pilot	
1963	Captain Sindbad	Aram	
1963	Jason and the Argonauts	Polydeuces	Uncredited
1963	The Victors	U.S. Army Captain at rest area	
1963	"Combat!"	German Sergeant Gunnar	
1964	The Americanization of Emily	Chief Petty Officer Paul Adams	
1965	The Greatest Story Ever Told	Alexander	
1965	I Saw What You Did	State Trooper	
1966	Duel at Diablo	Clay Dean	
1967	Return of the Gunfighter	Butch Cassidy	
1967	The Galileo Seven		Star Trek Episode
1969	The Ravine	Captain Keller	
1971	J. W. Coop	Rancher	
1972–1981	The Waltons	Sheriff Ep Bridges	TV Series
1972	Napoleon and Samantha	Desk Sergeant	
1972	Trouble Man	Sergeant Koeppler	
1972	The Poseidon Adventure	Chief Engineer	
1973	The Severed Arm	Doctor Ray Sanders	
1974	The Towering Inferno	Callahan	
1975	Night Moves	Tom Iverson	
1976	The Enforcer	The Mayor	
1977	Outlaw Blues	Buzz Cavenaugh	
1979	Tilt	Mickey	
1979	Hollywood Knight	Josh	
1979	Dreamer	Riverboat Captain	
1979	The Apple Dumpling Gang Rides Again	Captain Sherick	
1981	Elvis and the Beauty Queen	Vernon Presley	
1981	The Boogens	Brian Deering	
1981	The Other Victim		
1981	McClain's Law	Salvi	
1984	Yak's Best Ride	Director	
1989	Grave Secrets	Homer	
