= List of actors who have played Zorro =

The following is a list of actors who have played Zorro in various media.

== Radio and audio dramas ==
Name	Title	Date	Type
Guy Williams	The Adventures of Zorro	1958	Disney record series
Daniel Gélin	Zorro	1959	Disney record series (France-Canada)
Mark Arden	The Mark of Zorro	1997	BBC Radio serial
Kevin Cirone	Zorro and the Pirate Raiders	2009	Colonial Radio Theatre (American)
Kevin Cirone	Zorro Rides Again	2011	Colonial Radio Theatre (American)
Val Kilmer	The Mark of Zorro	2011	Blackstone Audio release
Gregg Porter	Zorro: The Legend Begins	2019	BearManor Media
Martin Marquez	The Legacy of Zorro	2026	Big Finish Productions

== Stage ==
Name	Title	Date	Type
Matt Rawle	Zorro	2008	Musical (UK Tour/West End)
Ricardo Afonso	Zorro	2020	Musical (Cadogan Hall concert)
Benjamin Purkiss	Zorro	2022	Musical (London production)
David Bustamante	El Zorro	2026	Musical (Spanish)

== Television and DTV films ==
Name	Title	Date	Type
Frank Langella	The Mark of Zorro	1974	Television film (American)
Patrick James	Zorro: The Legend Continues	1990	Unaired TV pilot (American)
Cusse Mankuma	The Amazing Zorro	2002	Animated TV movie (American)

== Television series ==
Name	Title	Date	Type
Guy Williams	Zorro	1957–1959	TV series (American)
Henry Darrow	The New Adventures of Zorro	1981	Animated series (American)
Henry Darrow	Zorro and Son	1983	TV series (American)
Paul Regina	Zorro and Son	1983	TV series (American)
Duncan Regehr	Zorro	1990–1993	TV series (American)
Toshihiko Seki	The Legend of Zorro	1996–1997	TV anime series (Japanese)
Michael Gough	The New Adventures of Zorro	1997–1998	Animated series (American)
Ben Small	Zorro: Generation Z	2006	Animated series (British-American-German)
Morgan Deare	Zorro: Generation Z – "A 'Z' in Time"	2006	Animated series (British-American-German)
Christian Meier	El Zorro, la espada y la rosa	2007	Telenovela (Colombian-American)
Richard Gutierrez	El Zorro, la espada y la rosa	2009	TV series (Filipino)
Johnny Yong Bosch	Zorro: The Chronicles	2015–2016	Animated series (Canadian-Italian-French)
Miguel Bernardeau	Zorro	2024	TV series (Spanish)
Dalia Xiuhcoatl	Zorro	2024	TV series (Spanish)
Cristo Fernández	Zorro	2024	TV series (Spanish)
Jean Dujardin	Zorro	2024	TV series (French)

== Theatrical films ==
Name	Title	Date	Type
Douglas Fairbanks	The Mark of Zorro	1920	American film
Douglas Fairbanks	Don Q, Son of Zorro	1925	American film
William Elid	À la manière de Zorro	1926	Belgian film
Robert Livingston	The Bold Caballero	1936	American film
John Carroll	Zorro Rides Again	1937	Film serial (American)
Reed Hadley	Zorro's Fighting Legion	1939	Film serial (American)
Tyrone Power	The Mark of Zorro	1940	American film
Linda Stirling	Zorro's Black Whip	1944	Film serial (American)
George Turner	Son of Zorro	1947	Film serial (American)
Resortes	El nieto del Zorro	1948	Mexican film
Clayton Moore	Ghost of Zorro	1949	Film serial (American)
Walter Chiari	The Dream of Zorro	1952	Italian film
José Suárez	Lawless Mountain	1953	Spanish film
Luis Aguilar	El Zorro escarlata en la venganza del ahorcado	1959	Mexican films, El Zorro escarlata series
Luis Aguilar	El regreso del monstruo	1959	Mexican films, El Zorro escarlata series
Luis Aguilar	El Zorro escarlata en diligencia fantasma	1959	Mexican films, El Zorro escarlata series
Luis Aguilar	El correo del norte	1960	Mexican films, El Zorro escarlata series
Luis Aguilar	La máscara de la muerte	1961	Mexican films, El Zorro escarlata series
Luis Aguilar	La trampa mortal	1962	Mexican films, El Zorro escarlata series
Luis Aguilar	La venganza de la Sombra	1962	Mexican films, El Zorro escarlata series
Luis Aguilar	El Zorro Vengador	1962	Mexican films, El Zorro escarlata series
Guy Williams	The Sign of Zorro	1958	Compilation film
Guy Williams	Zorro, the Avenger	1959	Compilation film
George Ardisson	Zorro alla corte di Spagna	1962	Italian film
George Ardisson	El Zorro	1968	Italian film
Frank Latimore	Zorro the Avenger	1962	Spanish film
Frank Latimore	The Shadow of Zorro	1962	Spanish film
Ámgel María Baltanás	Zorro the Avenger	1962	Voice only
Guy Stockwell	Le tre spade di Zorro	1963	Spanish-Italian film
Gordon Scott	Zorro and the Three Musketeers	1963	Italian film
Pierre Brice	Samson and the Slave Queen	1963	Italian film
Sean Flynn	Duel at the Rio Grande	1963	Spanish-Italian-French film
Tony Russel	Behind the Mask of Zorro	1965	Italian-Spanish film
Howard Ross	Zorro the Rebel	1966	Italian film
Dean Reed	The Nephews of Zorro	1968	Italian film
Franco Fantasia	The Nephews of Zorro	1968	Italian film
Tamer Yiğit	Zorro Kamçılı Süvari	1969	Turkish film
Tamer Yiğit	Zorro'nun İntikamı	1969	Turkish film
Nadir Moretti	Zorro marchese di Navarra	1969	Italian film
Spiros Focás	Zorro in the Court of England	1969	Italian film
Fabio Testi	The Avenger, Zorro	1969	Italian-Spanish film
Carlos Quiney	Zorro il dominatore	1969	Spanish-Italian film
Carlos Quiney	Zorro, il cavaliere della vendetta	1971	Spanish-Italian film
Carlos Quiney	El Zorro de Monterrey	1971	Spanish-Italian film
Jean-Michel Dhermay	Les aventures galantes de Zorro	1972	French-Belgian film
Douglas Frey	The Erotic Adventures of Zorro	1972	Italian-German film
Alberto Dell'Acqua	Man with the Golden Winchester	1973	Italian film
Alain Delon	Zorro	1975	Italian-French film
Franco Franchi	Il sogno di Zorro	1975	Italian film
Navin Nischol	Zorro	1975	Indian film
George Hilton	Mark of Zorro	1975	Italian film
Rodolfo de Anda	The Great Adventure of Zorro	1976	Mexican film
George Hamilton	Zorro, The Gay Blade	1981	American-Mexican film
Anthony Hopkins	The Mask of Zorro	1998	American film
Antonio Banderas	The Mask of Zorro	1998	American film
Antonio Banderas	The Legend of Zorro	2005	American film

== Video games ==
Name	Title	Date	Type
David Lugo	Zorro	1995	(Live-action cutscenes)
David Gasman	The Shadow of Zorro	2001	PlayStation 2
J.S. Gilbert	The Destiny of Zorro	2008	Wii
