= Son of Zorro =

1947 film

- Directed by: Spencer Gordon Bennet; Fred C. Brannon
- Written by: Franklin Adreon; Basil Dickey; Jesse Duffy; Sol Shor
- Produced by: Ronald Davidson
- Starring: George Turner; Peggy Stewart; Roy Barcroft; Ed Cassidy; Ernie Adams; Stanley Price; Edmund Cobb; Ken Terrell
- Cinematography: Bud Thackery
- Distributed by: Republic Pictures
- Release dates: January 18, 1947 (U.S. serial); December 23, 1957 (re-release)
- Running time: 13 chapters (180 minutes (serial); 6 26½-minute episodes (TV)
- Country: United States
- Language: English
- Budget: $146,723 (negative cost: $156,745)

Son of Zorro is a 1947 American Western film serial from Republic Pictures. It was the 43rd of the 66 serials produced by that studio. The serial was directed by Spencer Gordon Bennet and Fred C. Brannon. George Turner starred as a descendant of the original Zorro in 1860s United States.

== Plot ==
A man returning home after having fought in the American Civil War discovers that corrupt politicians have taken over the county and are terrorizing and shaking down the citizens. He dons the costume of his ancestor, the famous Zorro, and sets out to bring them to justice.

== Cast ==
- George Turner as Jeffrey "Jeff" Stewart/Zorro
- Peggy Stewart as Kate Wells
- Roy Barcroft as Boyd
- Ed Cassidy as Sheriff Moody
- Ernie Adams as Judge Hyde
- Stanley Price as Pancho
- Edmund Cobb as Stockton
- Ken Terrell as George Thomas
- Si Jenks as Fred
- Tom London as Mark Daniels (uncredited)

== Production ==
Son of Zorro was budgeted at $156,745 although the final negative cost was $119,343 (a $10,022, or 6.8%, overspend). It was the cheapest Republic serial of 1947. It was filmed between 21 June and 20 July 1946 under the working title Zorro Strikes Again. The serial's production number was 1695.

This was one of only four 13-chapter serials to be released by Republic. Three of the four were released in 1947, the only original serials released in that year. The fourth serial of the year was a re-release of the 15-chapter, 1941 serial Jungle Girl. This marked the first time Republic had re-released a serial to add to their first run serial releases.

=== Stunts ===
- Dale Van Sickel as Boyd, doubling Roy Barcroft
- Fred Graham as Boyd, doubling Roy Barcroft
- Ken Terrell as Pancho, doubling Stanley Price
- Tom Steele
- Tommy Coats
- John Daheim
- Ted Mapes
- Eddie Parker
- Post Park
- Gil Perkins
- Rocky Shahan
- Duke Taylor
- Bud Wolfe

=== Special effects ===
The special effects were created by the Lydecker brothers.

== Release ==
=== Theatrical ===
Son of Zorro's official release date is 18 January 1947, although this is actually the date the sixth chapter was made available to film exchanges. The release of Son of Zorro was followed by a re-release of Jungle Girl instead of a new serial. This was the first time Republic had re-released a serial. This was followed by the next new serial, Jesse James Rides Again. The serial was re-released on 23 December 1957 between the similar re-releases of Radar Men from the Moon and Zorro's Fighting Legion. The last original Republic serial release had been King of the Carnival in 1955.

=== Television ===
In the early 1950s, Son of Zorro was one of fourteen Republic serials edited into a TV series. It was broadcast in six 26½-minute episodes.

== Chapter titles ==
181 minutes =3h, 0m, 55s

1. Outlaw Country (19 min 59s)
2. The Deadly Millstone (13min 24s)
3. Fugitive from Injustice (13min 24s)
4. Buried Alive (13min 22s)
5. Water Trap (13min 25s)
6. Volley of Death (13min 24s)
7. The Fatal Records (13min 27s)
8. Third Degree (13min 25s)
9. Shoot to Kill (13min 22s) - a re-cap chapter
10. Den of the Beast (13min 24s)
11. The Devil's Trap (13min 25s)
12. Blazing Walls (13min 23s)
13. Check Mate (13min 25s)

_{Source:}

== See also ==
- List of film serials
- List of film serials by studio

Preceded by The Crimson Ghost (1946)	Republic Serial; Son of Zorro (1947)	Succeeded by Jesse James Rides Again (1947)
Preceded by Zorro's Black Whip (1944)	Zorro Serial; Son of Zorro (1947)	Succeeded by Ghost of Zorro (1949)
