= Secret Service in Darkest Africa =

1943 film by Spencer Gordon Bennet

- Directed by: Spencer Gordon Bennet
- Written by: Royal Cole; Ronald Davidson; Basil Dickey; Jesse Duffy; Joseph O'Donnell; Joseph Poland
- Produced by: William J. O'Sullivan
- Starring: Rod Cameron; Joan Marsh; Duncan Renaldo; Lionel Royce; Kurt Kreuger; Frederic Brunn
- Cinematography: William Bradford
- Edited by: Wallace Grissell; Tom Malloy
- Music by: Mort Glickman
- Distributed by: Republic Pictures
- Release date: July 24, 1943
- Running time: 15 chapters (243 minutes) (serial); 100 minutes (TV)
- Country: United States
- Language: English
- Budget: $174,536 (negative cost: $210,033)

Secret Service in Darkest Africa is a 1943 Republic serial. It was Republic's 30th serial, of the 66 produced by the studio.

It was a sequel to G-Men vs. the Black Dragon released earlier in 1943, again starring Rod Cameron as American secret agent Rex Bennett. This time Bennet faces the Nazis rather than the Japanese. As with the earlier installment, Bennet is supported by characters from some of the allied nations in World War II.

The serial is also known by the titles Manhunt in the African Jungles, changed when it was re-released in 1954, and The Baron's African War, when it was edited into a 100-minute film for television in 1966.

== Plot ==
In an attempt to control the entire Middle East and defeat the Allies, Nazi agent Baron von Rommler captures and impersonates Sultan Abou Ben Ali, leader of all the Arabs. Opposed to him is Secret Service Agent Rex Bennett, along with British reporter and aviatrix Janet Blake and French Chief of Police in Casablanca, Captain Pierre LaSalle.

== Cast ==
- Rod Cameron as Rex Bennett
- Joan Marsh as Janet Blake
- Duncan Renaldo as Captain Pierre LaSalle
- Lionel Royce as Baron von Rommler
- Kurt Kreuger as Ernst Muller
- Frederic Brunn as Wolfe
- Sigurd Tor as Luger
- Georges Renavent as Armand

== Production ==
Filming on Secret Service in Darkest Africa took place between April 12 and May 27, 1943. The production budget was $174,536 but the negative cost rose to $210,033 ($35,497, or 20.3%, overbudget compared to a studio average of $8,199, or 5.7%, over all its serial production). Not only did this make the serial the most expensive of 1943 it was also the third most expensive and third most over budget of all the sixty-six serials Republic produced. The only serials that were more expensive were The Lone Ranger Rides Again (1939, $213,997) and Captain America (1944, $222,906). While Captain America was also the most overbudget (by $40,283 or 22.1%), the second most overbudget Republic serial was another 1944 serial, Haunted Harbor (by $37,757 or 22.2%).

At forty-five days, the serial's production also shares the title of the second longest shoot of all Republic serials with Jungle Girl (1941). The longest was Drums of Fu Manchu (1940) at forty-seven days. The serial's production number was 1295.

A car chase from this serial was re-used in Flying Disc Man from Mars.

=== Stunts ===
- Tom Steele as Rex Bennett (doubling Rod Cameron)
- John Daheim
- George DeNormand
- Bud Geary
- Duke Green
- Carey Loftin
- Eddie Parker
- Ken Terrell
- Joe Yrigoyen

=== Special Effects ===
The special effects in this serial were produced by Republic's in-house effects duo, the Lydecker brothers.

== Release ==
=== Theatrical ===
Secret Service in Darkest Africa's official release date is July 24, 1943, although this is actually the date the seventh chapter was made available to film exchanges.

The serial was re-released on April 5, 1954, under the new title Manhunt in the African Jungles, between the first runs of Trader Tom of the China Seas and Man with the Steel Whip.

=== Television ===
Secret Service in Darkest Africa was one of twenty-six Republic serials re-released as a film on television in 1966. The title of the film was changed to The Baron's African War. This version was cut down to 100 minutes in length.

== Critical reception ==
Stedman compares Secret Service in Darkest Africa poorly to the first serial, G-Men vs. the Black Dragon, which was directed by William Witney. He considered Darkest Africa to be example of the decline of serials. Spencer Gordon Bennet, the director of this sequel, is blamed for this lapse, giving the serial a style similar to the Batman television series of the mid-1960s. Two scenes are highlighted. In the first, a duel goes into and then out of a wardrobe without stopping. In the second, the meaning of a clue is deduced with the following dialogue:

"Two face cards lying face up"
"With holes in them"
"Wait a minute! Holes? No, they're 'O's. Aces with 'O's!"
"'O'-Aces!"
"Oasis Cafe! Let's Go!"

This style was toned down in future Bennet-directed serials.

In the words of Cline, both this serial and its predecessor were "well-made topical drama with highly capable and professional casts". In a departure from the normal formula, the villain's identity is known to the audience.

== Chapter titles ==
1. North African Intrigue (25min 26s)
2. The Charred Witness (15min 35s)
3. Double Death (15min 33s)
4. The Open Grave (15min 34s)
5. Cloaked in Flame (15min 36s)
6. Dial of Doom (15min 36s)
7. Murder Dungeon (15min 35s)
8. Funeral Arrangements Completed (15min 35s)
9. Invisible Menace (15min 35s)
10. Racing Peril (15min 34s)
11. Lightning Terror (15min 34s)
12. Ceremonial Execution (15min 33s)
13. Fatal Leap (15min 33s)
14. Victim of Villainy (15min 33s)
15. Nazi Treachery Unmasked (15min 33s)

_{Source:}>

This was the only 15-chapter serial produced by Republic in 1943. The other two productions were both 12-chapter serials. It had been the standard since 1938 for Republic to release two of each (which they did again for the last time in 1944).
