= G–Men Never Forget =

1948 film by Fred C. Brannon, Yakima Canutt

G-Men Never Forget
- Directed by: Fred C. Brannon; Yakima Canutt
- Written by: Franklin Adreon; Basil Dickey; Jesse Duffy; Sol Shor
- Produced by: M. J. Frankovich
- Starring: Clayton Moore; Roy Barcroft; Ramsay Ames; Drew Allen; Tom Steele; Dale Van Sickel; Edmund Cobb; Stanley Price; Jack O'Shea
- Cinematography: John MacBurnie
- Distributed by: A Republic Serial
- Release date: January 31, 1948 (U.S. serial)
- Running time: 12 chapters / 167 minutes (serial); 100 minutes (TV)
- Country: United States
- Language: English
- Budget: $151,061 (negative cost: $151,554)

G–Men Never Forget is a 1948 American movie serial from Republic Pictures. The serial was condensed into a 100-minute feature film in 1966 under the title Code 645.

== Plot ==
Escaped criminal Victor Murkland (Roy Barcroft) kidnaps the police commissioner and, with the aid of plastic surgery, takes his place. Federal Agent Ted O'Hara (Clayton Moore) is called in to try to stop the wave of crime initiated by Murkland, not knowing that Murkland is posing as the police commissioner and is aware of O'Haras' every move. The real commissioner is being held captive in a mental hospital run by Dr. Benson (Stanley Price). O'Hara is aided by the beautiful Sgt. Frances Blake (Ramsay Ames). Murkland's gang threatens to destroy a major tunnel being built underneath a channel, and blackmails the builder into paying him protection money.

== Cast ==
- Clayton Moore as Agent Ted O'Hara
- Roy Barcroft as Victor Murkland/Commissioner Angus Cameron
- Ramsay Ames as Frances Blake
- Drew Allen as Duke Graham
- Tom Steele as Parker, a thug
- Dale Van Sickel as Brent/Slocum, both thugs
- Edmund Cobb as R.J. Cook
- Stanley Price as 'Doc' Benson
- Jack O'Shea as Slater

== Production ==
G-Men Never Forget was budgeted at $151,061 although the final negative cost was $151,554 (a $493, or 0.3%, overspend). It was the most expensive Republic serial of 1948.

It was filmed between July 16 and August 7, 1947. The serial's production number was 1698.

=== Stunts ===
- Tom Steele as Agent Ted O'Hara/Vic Murkland/Commissioner Angus Cameron/Duke Graham (doubling Clayton Moore, Drew Allen & Roy Barcroft)
- Dale Van Sickel as Agent Ted O'Hara/Duke Graham (doubling Clayton Moore & Drew Allen)
- David Sharpe
- John Daheim
- Duke Green
- Carey Loftin
- George Magrill
- Gil Perkins
- Ken Terrell
- Bud Wolfe

=== Special effects ===
The special effects were created by the Lydecker brothers.

== Release ==
=== Theatrical ===
G–Men Never Forget's official release date is January 31, 1948, although this is actually the date the sixth chapter was made available to film exchanges.

=== Television ===
G-Men Never Forget was one of twenty-six Republic serials re-released as a film on television in 1966. The title of the film was changed to Code 645. This version was cut down to 100-minutes in length.

== Chapter titles ==
1. Death Rides the Torrent (20min)
2. The Flaming Doll House/100,000 Volts (13min 20s)
3. Code Six-Four-Five (13min 20s)
4. Shipyard Saboteurs (13min 20s)
5. The Dead Man Speaks (13min 20s)
6. Marked Money/Marked Evidence (13min 20s)
7. Hot Cargo (13min 20s)
8. The Fatal Letter (13min 20s)
9. The Death Wind (13min 20s) - a re-cap chapter
10. The Innocent Victim (13min 20s)
11. Counter-Plot (13min 20s)
12. Exposed (13min 20s)

_{Source:}

== See also ==
- List of film serials by year
- List of film serials by studio

Preceded by The Black Widow (1947)	Republic Serial; G-Men Never Forget (1948)	Succeeded by Dangers of the Canadian Mounted (1948)
