= Dangers of the Canadian Mounted =

1948 film by Fred C. Brannon, Yakima Canutt

- Directed by: Fred C. Brannon; Yakima Canutt
- Written by: Franklin Adreon; Basil Dickey; Sol Shor; Robert G Walker
- Produced by: M.J. Frankovich
- Starring: Jim Bannon; Virginia Belmont; Anthony Warde; Dorothy Granger; Bill Van Sickel; Tom Steele; Dale Van Sickel
- Cinematography: John MacBurnie
- Release dates: April 24, 1948 (U.S. serial); December 31, 1956 (U.S. re-release)
- Running time: 12 chapters / 167 minutes (serial); 100 minutes (TV)
- Budget: $150,038 (negative cost: $150,130)

Dangers of the Canadian Mounted is a 1948 Northern Republic film serial.

== Plot ==
A criminal gang discovers a Genghis Khan treasure ship on the Canada-Alaska border. However, the treasure itself is hidden on land. In their efforts to find the hidden riches, they resort to murder and sabotage to stop the construction of the Alcan highway which will bring homesteaders to the area.

Sergeant Christopher 'Chris' Royal of the Royal Canadian Mounted Police and his allies battle their way to find the crooks, and to learn the identity of their mysterious leader known only as 'The Boss'.

== Cast ==
- Jim Bannon as Sergeant Christopher 'Chris' Royal, RCMP
- Virginia Belmont as Roberta "Bobbie" Page
- Anthony Warde as Mort Fowler
- Dorothy Granger as Skagway Kate
- Bill Van Sickel as Dan Page
- Tom Steele as Fagan/Carter/Truck Driver/Lou/Sloane/Spike
- Dale Van Sickel as Boyd/Pete/Bart/Scott/Steele

== Production ==
Dangers of the Canadian Mounted was budgeted at $150,038 although the final negative cost was $150,130 (a $92, or 0.1%, overspend).

It was filmed between 7 October and 28 October 1947. The serial's production number was 1699.

=== Stunts ===
- Tom Steele as Sergeant Chris Royal (doubling Jim Bannon)
- Dale Van Sickel as Mort Fowler (doubling Anthony Warde)
- Carey Loftin
- Eddie Parker
- Ken Terrell
- Bud Wolfe

=== Special effects ===
The special Effects were created by the Lydecker brothers.

== Release ==
=== Theatrical ===
Dangers of the Canadian Mounted's official release date is 24 April 1948, although this is actually the date the sixth chapter was made available to film exchanges.

This was followed by a re-release of Dick Tracy Returns instead of a new serial. The next new serial, Adventures of Frank and Jesse James, followed in the autumn.

The serial was re-released on 31 December 1956 between the similar re-releases of Federal Operator 99 and The Purple Monster Strikes. The last original Republic serial release was King of the Carnival in 1955.

=== Television ===
Dangers of the Canadian Mounted was one of twenty-six Republic serials re-released as a film on television in 1966. The title of the film was changed to R.C.M.P. and the Treasure of Genghis Khan. This version was cut down to 100 minutes in length.

== Chapter titles ==
1. Legend of Genghis Khan (20min)
2. Key to the Legend (13min 20s)
3. Ghost Town (13min 20s)
4. Terror in the Sky (13min 20s)
5. Pursuit (13min 20s)
6. Stolen Cargo (13min 20s)
7. The Fatal Shot (13min 20s)
8. False Testimony (13min 20s)
9. The Prisoner Spy (13min 20s)
10. The Secret Meeting (13min 20s) - a re-cap chapter
11. Secret of the Altar (13min 20s)
12. Liquid Jewels (13min 20s)

_{Source:}

== See also ==
- List of film serials by year
- List of film serials by studio

Preceded by G-Men Never Forget (1948)	Republic Serial; Dangers of the Canadian Mounted (1948)	Succeeded by Adventures of Frank and Jesse James (1948)
