= Jesse James Rides Again =

1947 film by Thomas Carr, Fred C. Brannon

- Directed by: Fred C. Brannon; Thomas Carr
- Written by: Franklin Adreon; Basil Dickey; Jesse Duffy; Sol Shor
- Produced by: M. J. Frankovich
- Starring: Clayton Moore; Linda Stirling; Roy Barcroft; John Compton; Tristram Coffin; Tom London; Holly Bane; Edmund Cobb
- Cinematography: John MacBurnie
- Distributed by: Republic Pictures
- Release dates: August 2, 1947 (U.S. serial); March 28, 1955 (U.S. re-release)
- Running time: 13 chapters / 180 minutes
- Country: United States
- Language: English
- Budget: $149,967 (negative cost: $180,497)

Jesse James Rides Again is a 1947 American Republic Western film serial.

== Plot ==
Gunfighter Jesse James is framed for a Missouri bank job and murder by a black-cowled outlaw gang, known as "The Black Raiders". Unable to clear his name, he and companion Steve Lane, whose father was murdered during the bank robbery, flee to escape the posse. They ride into a town where they receive shelter from Ann Bolton and her elderly father, Sam Bolton, whose ranch is being regularly attacked by The Black Raiders. The same gang are led by Frank Lawton, who in turn had been hired by James Clark, a businessman. Through him, The Black Raiders attempt to drive the Boltons and other farmers off their land because of localized oil reserves in the area.

== Cast ==
- Clayton Moore as Jesse James
- Linda Stirling as Ann Bolton. It was during filming of this serial that Linda Stirling met her future husband Sloane Nibley.
- Roy Barcroft as Frank Lawton
- John Compton as Steve Lane
- Tristram Coffin as James Clark
- Tom London as Sam Bolton
- Holly Bane as Tim
- Edmund Cobb as Farmer Wilkie

== Production ==
Jesse James Rides Again was budgeted at $149,967 although the final negative cost was $180,497 (a $30,530, or 20.4%, overspend).

It was filmed between January 10 and February 5, 1947. The serial's production number was 1696.

This was one of only four 13-chapter serials to be released by Republic. Three of the four were released in 1947, the only original serials released in that year. The fourth serial of the year was a re-release of the 15-chapter, 1941 serial Jungle Girl. This marked the first time Republic had re-released a serial to add to their first run serial releases.

=== Stunts ===
- Tom Steele as Jesse James (doubling Clayton Moore)
- Dale Van Sickel as Frank Lawton/James Clark (doubling Roy Barcroft & Tristram Coffin)

=== Special Effects ===
Special effects were created by the Lydecker brothers.

== Release ==
=== Theatrical ===
Jesse James Rides Again's official release date is 2 August 1947, although this is actually the date the sixth chapter was made available to film exchanges.

The serial was re-released on 28 March 1955 between the first runs of Panther Girl of the Kongo and King of the Carnival.

== Chapter titles ==
1. The Black Raiders (20 min)
2. Signal for Action (13 min 20 s)
3. The Stacked Deck (13 min 20 s)
4. Concealed Evidence (13 min 20 s)
5. The Corpse of Jesse James (13 min 20 s)
6. The Traitor (13 min 20 s)
7. Talk or Die! (13 min 20 s)
8. Boomerang (13 min 20 s)
9. The Captured Raider (13 min 20 s) – a re-cap chapter
10. The Revealing Torch (13 min 20 s)
11. The Spy (13 min 20 s)
12. Black Gold (13 min 20 s)
13. Deadline at Midnight (13 min 20 s)

_{Source:}

== See also ==
- Adventures of Frank and Jesse James (1948) – Republic's 2nd Jesse James serial
- The James Brothers of Missouri (1949) – Republic's 3rd Jesse James serial
- List of film serials by year
- List of film serials by studio

Preceded by Son of Zorro (1947)	Republic Serial; Jesse James Rides Again (1947)	Succeeded by The Black Widow (1947)
