= Adventures of Red Ryder =

1940 film by John English, William Witney

The Adventures of Red Ryder
- Theatrical poster for Chapter 1
- Directed by: William Witney; John English
- Written by: Franklin Adreon; Ronald Davidson; Norman S. Hall; Barney A. Sarecky; Sol Shor
- Produced by: Hiram S. Brown Jr
- Starring: Donald "Red" Barry; Noah Beery; Tommy Cook; Bob Kortman; William Farnum; Maude Pierce Allen; Vivian Coe; Hal Taliaferro
- Cinematography: William Nobles
- Edited by: William P. Thompson; Edward Todd
- Music by: Cy Feuer; William Lava; Paul Sawtell
- Distributed by: Republic Pictures
- Release date: June 28, 1940
- Running time: 12 chapters / 211 minutes
- Country: United States
- Language: English
- Budget: $144,852 (negative cost: $145,961)

The Adventures of Red Ryder is a 1940 American 12-chapter movie serial from Republic Pictures, directed by William Witney and John English and starring Don "Red" Barry and Noah Beery, Sr., based on the Western comic strip Red Ryder by Fred Harmon. This serial is the 18th of the 66 serials produced by Republic.

== Plot ==
A gang, led by banker Calvin Drake, plans to drive off ranchers from their land to profit from a railroad. However, on one of these ranches, the Circle R, lives the Ryder family who resist the gang. After his father, Tom, is killed by One Eye Chapin, Red Ryder swears revenge and sets out to defeat the gang once and for all.

== Cast ==
- Donald "Red" Barry as Red Ryder. Donald Barry retained the nickname from this serial as Don "Red" Barry.
- Noah Beery as Ace Hanlon
- Tommy Cook as Little Beaver
- Maude Pierce Allen as Duchess Ryder
- Vivian Coe as Beth Andrews
- Harry Worth as Calvin Drake
- Hal Taliaferro as Cherokee Sims
- William Farnum as Colonel Tom Ryder
- Bob Kortman as One-Eye Chapin
- Carleton Young as Sheriff Dade
- Ray Teal as Shark
- Gene Alsace as Deputy Lawson
- Gayne Whitman as Harrison
- Hooper Atchley as Commissioner Treadway
- John Dilson as Hale
- Lloyd Ingraham as Sheriff Luke Andrews
- Charles Hutchinson as Brown
- Gardner James as H.S. Barnett
- Wheaton Chambers as Boswell
- Lynton Brent as Len Clark

== Production ==
The Adventures of Red Ryder was based on Fred Harman's comic strip. The serial was budgeted at $144,852 although the final negative cost was $145,961 (a $1,109, or 0.8%, overspend). 1940 was the first year in which Republic's overall spending on serial production was less than in the previous year. It was filmed between 27 March and 25 April 1940. The serial's production number was 997. The special effects were created by the Lydecker brothers, Republic's in-house effects team.

=== Stunts ===
- David Sharpe as Red Ryder (doubling Don "Red" Barry)
- Duke Green
- Ted Mapes
- Post Park
- Ken Terrell
- Bill Yrigoyen
- Joe Yrigoyen

== Release ==
=== Theatrical ===
The Adventures of Red Ryder's official release date is 28 June 1940, although this is actually the date the sixth chapter was made available to film exchanges.

== Chapter titles ==
1. Murder on the Santa Fe Trail (27min 48s)
2. Horsemen of Death (16min 42s)
3. Trail's End (16min 41s)
4. Water Rustlers (16min 39s)
5. Avalanche (16min 44s)
6. Hangman's Noose (16min 44s)
7. Framed (16min 42s)
8. Blazing Walls (16min 42s)
9. Records of Doom (16min 42s)
10. One Second to Live (16min 43s)
11. The Devil's Marksman (16min 41s)
12. Frontier Justice (16min 44s)

_{Source:}

This was one of two 12-chapter serials produced by Republic in 1940. The other is the following King of the Royal Mounted, also based on a comic strip. Republic's standard pattern was two 12-chapter serials and two 15-chapter serials in each year.

Preceded by Drums of Fu Manchu (1940)	Republic Serial; Adventures of Red Ryder (1940)	Succeeded by King of the Royal Mounted (1940)
Preceded by Drums of Fu Manchu (1940)	Witney-English Serial; Adventures of Red Ryder (1940)	Succeeded by King of the Royal Mounted (1940)
