= Radar Patrol vs. Spy King =

1949 film by Fred C. Brannon

- Directed by: Fred C. Brannon
- Written by: Royal Cole; William Lively; Sol Shor
- Produced by: Franklin Adreon
- Starring: Kirk Alyn; Jean Dean; John Merton; George J. Lewis; Eve Whitney; Anthony Warde
- Cinematography: Ellis W. Carter
- Music by: Stanley Wilson
- Distributed by: Republic Pictures
- Release date: November 23, 1949 (U.S.)
- Running time: 12 chapters (167 minutes)
- Country: United States
- Language: English
- Budget: $164,970 (negative cost: $164,632)

Radar Patrol vs. Spy King is a 1949 12-chapter black-and-white spy film serial produced and distributed by Republic Pictures from an original, commissioned screenplay collaboratively written by Royal K. Cole, William Lively and Sol Shor. Kirk Alyn played the lead.

== Plot ==
John Baroda, a neo-Nazi and his alter ego, The Spy King and his aide Nitra, are part of a sabotaging team for a vast defense system of radar stations along the US borders. Radar Defense Bureau operative Chris Calvert comes to the rescue of radar scientist, Joan Hughes, who has been kidnapped by Baroda's henchmen...

== Cast ==
- Kirk Alyn as Chris Calvert
- Jean Dean as Joan Hughes
- John Merton as John Baroda/Spy King
- George J. Lewis as Lt Manuel Agura
- Eve Whitney as Nitra
- Anthony Warde as Ricco
- Stephen Gregory as Hugo
- Tristram Coffin as Franklin Lord

== Production ==
Radar Patrol vs. Spy King was budgeted at $164,970 although the final negative cost was $164,632 (a $338, or 0.2%, under spend). It was filmed between 20 September and 12 October 1949. The serial's production number was 1706.

=== Stunts ===
- Tom Steele as Chris Calvert & Ricco Morgan (doubling Kirk Alyn & Anthony Warde)
- Dale Van Sickel Chris Calvert, Ricco Morgan & Lt Manuel Agura (doubling Kirk Alyn, Anthony Warde and George J. Lewis)
- David Sharpe as Lt Manuel Agura (doubling George J. Lewis)

=== Special effects ===
The special effects were created by the Lydecker brothers.

== Release ==
=== Theatrical ===
Radar Patrol vs. Spy King's official release date is November 23, 1949, although this is actually the date the sixth chapter was made available to film exchanges. This was followed by a re-release of Undersea Kingdom instead of a new serial. The next new serial, The Invisible Monster, followed in spring of 1950.

== Chapter titles ==
1. The Fatal Fog (20min)
2. Perilous Trail (13min 20s)
3. Rolling Fury (13min 20s)
4. Flight of the Spy King (13min 20s)
5. Trapped Underground (13min 20s)
6. Wheels of Disaster (13min 20s)
7. Electrocution (13min 20s)
8. Death Rings the Phone (13min 20s)
9. Tomb of Terror (13min 20s)
10. Death Dive (13min 20s) - a re-cap chapter
11. Desperate Mission (13min 20s)
12. Day of Reckoning (13min 20s)

_{Source:}

== See also ==
- List of film serials
- List of film serials by studio

Preceded by The James Brothers of Missouri (1949)	Republic Serial; Radar Patrol vs. Spy King (1949)	Succeeded by The Invisible Monster (1950)
