= Dick Tracy's G-Men =

1939 film by John English, William Witney

- Directed by: William Witney; John English
- Written by: Franklin Adreon; Ronald Davidson; Barry Shipman; Rex Taylor; Sol Shor; Chester Gould (comic strip)
- Produced by: Robert M. Beche
- Starring: Ralph Byrd; Irving Pichel; Ted Pearson; Phylis Isley; Walter Miller; George Douglas
- Cinematography: William Nobles
- Distributed by: Republic Pictures
- Release dates: September 2, 1939 (U.S.); September 19, 1955 (U.S. re-release)
- Running time: 15 chapters / 263 minutes
- Country: United States
- Language: English
- Budget: $159,876 (negative cost: $163,530)

Dick Tracy's G-Men (1939) is a 15-Chapter Republic movie serial based on the Dick Tracy comic strip by Chester Gould. It was directed by William Witney and John English.

This serial was the fifteenth of the sixty-six produced by Republic, and the third Dick Tracy serial (there would be one more, Dick Tracy vs. Crime, Inc., in 1941). As with the other three Dick Tracy serials, Ralph Byrd plays the lead. This time he faces Irving Pichel as Zarnoff, head of an international spy ring. Future Academy Award winner Jennifer Jones (credited here under her birth name of Phylis Isley) co-stars as Gwen Andrews.

"G-Man" is a contemporary slang term for an agent of the FBI. In the comic strip, Dick Tracy is a detective in the police force of an unnamed Midwestern city resembling Chicago, but this was changed for the serial.

== Plot ==
Zarnoff, an international spy in the employ of "The Three Powers" (presumably a fictionalized reference to the Axis) is captured by Dick Tracy at the start of the serial, tried and sentenced to death. However, through the use of a rare drug embedded by his agents in the evening newspaper, he escapes from the gas chamber. His men pick up his "corpse" by ambushing the hearse and administering another drug to counter the effects. He continues his espionage, while planning his revenge on Tracy.

== Cast ==
- Ralph Byrd as Dick Tracy
- Irving Pichel as Nicolas Zarnoff
- Ted Pearson as Steve Lockwood
- Phylis Isley as Gwen Andrews. The 20-year-old Phylis Isley went on to win an Academy Award for best actress four years later in 1943 for The Song of Bernadette, under the screen name Jennifer Jones.
- Walter Miller as Robal, one of Zarnoff's henchmen. Miller was a veteran of action features and serials, with a screen career going back to 1911; Dick Tracy's G-Men was his last serial. He died in early 1940.
- George Douglas as Sandoval, one of Zarnoff's henchmen

== Production ==
Dick Tracy's G-Men was budgeted at $159,876 although the final negative cost was $163,530 (a $3,654, or 2.3%, overspend). Although the previous serial, Daredevils of the Red Circle, came in under budget, that was an exception to the rule. Most Republic serials went slightly over budget and this one was not significantly so in comparison.

It was filmed between June 17 and July 27, 1939 under the working title Dick Tracy and his G-Men. The serial's production number was 896.

The footage of the exploding airship at the end of Chapter 9 and the beginning of Chapter 10 was newsreel footage of the Hindenburg airship explosion of 1937.

This serial, like all the sequels to the 1937 original Dick Tracy serial, was permitted by an interpretation of the original contract, which allowed a "series or serial". Therefore, Chester Gould was not paid again for the right to produce this serial.

== Reception ==
As was customary with serials, the first chapter was treated as a special attraction, running longer than the others as a means of generating audience interest. Trade reviewers were shown the first chapter, running half an hour, as a sample of the entire serial. In a review titled "Whirlwind Action", Film Daily raved, "Examination of the initial chapter of this new serial is convincing evidence that the screen's sagas of excitement have reached a new spine-tingling level, for Ralph Byrd, in interpreting the character of Dick Tracy, furnishes enough action and hair-raising exploits to satisfy the most jaded thirsters for peril and adventure." Motion Picture Herald observed, "Dick Tracy on the screen is slowly but surely acquiring the permanence of Dick Tracy of printers' ink. Judging from what happens in the first chapter this serial appears likely to be as popular as its predecessors, replete with action, suspense, and more action." Boxoffice predicted a good response from serial fans: "An appraisal of the first episode indicates action, and suspense is paramount... Credulity is set aside and it is every script writer for himself. And what they turn out will make the kids come around for more." Showmen's Trade Review noted that the imaginative perils were an asset: "Republic has made the implausible seem indeed plausible and exciting. Well directed and acted, it will please wherever serials are in demand."

A 1940 poll of exhibitors ranked short subjects and serials in order of audience popularity. Dick Tracy's G-Men just missed the top 10 in the serial category, ranking at #11. (The winners, by large margins, were Columbia serials: The Spider's Web and The Great Adventures of Wild Bill Hickok.)

== Releases ==
Dick Tracy's G-Men's official release date was September 2, 1939, although this is actually the date the seventh chapter was made available to film exchanges.

The serial was re-released on September 19, 1955 following the release of Republic's final, newly produced serial King of the Carnival. Republic had been re-releasing serials since 1948 but, beginning with Dick Tracy's G-Men, all of Republic's remaining serial releases would be reissues, finishing with a re-release of Zorro's Fighting Legion in March 1958.

VCI released the serial on two DVD discs in 2008. It was later released together with the other three Dick Tracy serials in a boxed DVD set by VCI in 2013.

== Chapter titles ==
1. The Master Spy (29min 55s)
2. Captured (16min 42s)
3. The False Signal (16min 38s)
4. The Enemy Strikes (16min 44s)
5. Crack-up! (16min 39s)
6. Sunken Peril (16min 39s)
7. Tracking the Enemy (16min 40s)
8. Chamber of Doom (16min 41s)
9. Flames of Jeopardy (16min 37s)
10. Crackling Fury (16min 40s)
11. Caverns of Peril (16min 39s)
12. Fight in the Sky (16min 39s)
13. The Fatal Ride (16min 40s) - a recap chapter
14. Getaway (16min 38s)
15. The Last Stand (16min 41s)

_{Source:}
