= Daredevils of the Red Circle =

1939 film by John English, William Witney

- Directed by: William Witney; John English
- Written by: Barry Shipman; Franklin Adreon; Rex Taylor; Ronald Davidson; Sol Shor
- Produced by: Robert M. Beche
- Starring: Charles Quigley; Herman Brix; David Sharpe; Carole Landis; Miles Mander; Charles Middleton
- Cinematography: William Nobles
- Edited by: Edward Todd; William Thompson
- Music by: William Lava
- Distributed by: Republic Pictures
- Release dates: June 10, 1939 (U.S. serial); March 1953 (Austria); January 26, 2002 (France)
- Running time: 12 chapters / 211 minutes (serial); 6 26½-minute episodes (TV)
- Country: United States
- Language: English
- Budget: $126,855 (negative cost: $126,118)

Daredevils of the Red Circle (1939) is a 12-chapter Republic Movie Serial starring Charles Quigley, David Sharpe, Herman Brix (better known under his subsequent stage name, Bruce Bennett), Carole Landis, Miles Mander (in a dual role) and Charles Middleton. It was directed by William Witney and John English and is considered one of the better serials produced by Republic. The serial was the fourteenth of the sixty-six serials produced by the studio.

== Plot ==
An escaped criminal, known as Harry Crowl, but preferring to be called by his prison number 39013 (pronounced Thirty Nine - Oh - Thirteen), seeks revenge on the man who sent him to prison, millionaire philanthropist Horace Granville. He kidnaps Granville, imprisoning him within his own house, and disguises himself to take Granville's place, as the frail old man in a clean room, necessary for his health, with the only other person allowed past the glass barrier being his doctor. He then sets about methodically destroying everything Granville owns. When we enter the film, he has already destroyed a number of Granville properties, and has set his sights on the Granville Amusement Centre, at which a trio of acrobats is performing. The daredevils, Gene, Bert, and Tiny escape but Gene's kid brother is badly wounded in the blaze, and later dies of his injuries. Seeking revenge, they take jobs as private investigators for the man they believe to be Horace Granville. Through a series of deadly traps, and with the help of a mysterious cloaked figure, known only as "The Red Circle", the daredevils begin to unravel the truth.

In the first chapter, we are introduced to all the above facts, and even shown the secret room within the Granville estates where 39013 is keeping the real Granville. He is kept in a cell, the exact duplicate of the one in which 39013 resided for his abruptly ended sentence. This room is trapped, so that in the event that 39013 does not return, a dripping reservoir will run dry. The loss of weight will tip the scale, causing deadly gas capsules to break upon the floor, killing Granville in a very short time. This causes him to spout the characteristic line, "You best hope I continue to live, Granville."

== Cast ==
=== Main cast ===
- Charles Quigley as Gene Townley, high diver, one of the Daredevils of the Red Circle
- Herman Brix as Tiny Dawson, strongman, one of the Daredevils of the Red Circle
- David Sharpe as Bert Knowles, escape artist, one of the Daredevils of the Red Circle
- Carole Landis as Blanche Granville, Granddaughter of Horace Granville
- Miles Mander as Horace Granville, millionaire philanthropist victim and ex-partner of 39013, and also as 39013 when he is impersonating Granville
- Charles Middleton as Harry Crowel/39013, escaped criminal with a vendetta against Horace Granville

=== Supporting cast ===
- C. Montague Shaw as Malcolm, Horace Granville's doctor
- Ben Taggart as Dixon, Horace Granville's manager
- William Pagan as Landon, police chief
- Corbet Morris as Klein, one of 39013's henchmen
- Raymond Bailey as Stanley, Horace Granville's secretary and one of 39013's henchmen
- Snowflake as Snowflake, black comic-relief servant of Horace Granville
- George Chesebro as Sheffield, one of 39013's henchmen
- Ray Miller as Jeff, Horace Granville's nurse
- Robert Winkler as Sammy Townley, Gene's younger brother
- Stanley Price as Prof. Selden (uncredited)
- "Tuffie", the dog

== Production ==
Daredevils of the Red Circle was budgeted at $126,855 although the final negative cost was $126,118 (a $737, or 0.6%, under spend). It was the cheapest Republic serial of 1939 and one of only three pre-war serials to be made under budget. The other two were The Fighting Devil Dogs (1938) and Mysterious Doctor Satan (1940).

It was filmed between 28 March and 28 April 1939. The serial's production number was 897.

Ironically, David Sharpe, who is generally considered to have been one of the greatest stuntmen in the movies, had to be doubled in action scenes by Jimmy Fawcett because he was playing a leading role, and the studio could not risk any production delays were Sharpe to suffer injury.

== Release ==
=== Theatrical ===
Daredevils of the Red Circle's official release date is 10 June 1939, although this is actually the date the sixth chapter was made available to film exchanges.

=== Television ===
In the early 1950s, Daredevils of the Red Circle was one of fourteen Republic serials edited into a television series. It was broadcast in six 26½-minute episodes.

== Chapter titles ==
1. The Monstrous Plot (27 min 48s)
2. The Mysterious Friend (16 min 41s)
3. The Executioner (16 min 45s)
4. Sabotage (16 min 38s)
5. The Ray of Death (16 min 39s)
6. Thirty Seconds to Live (16 min 39s)
7. The Flooded Mine (16 min 42s)
8. S.O.S. (16 min 40s)
9. Ladder of Peril (16 min 39s)
10. The Infernal Machine (16 min 36s)
11. The Red Circle Speaks (16 min 39s) -- Re-Cap Chapter
12. Flight to Doom (16 min 40s)

_{Source:}

Note: This was one of two 12-chapter serials released by Republic in 1939. The other was Zorro's Fighting Legion. Republic also released two 15-chapter serials in this year.

== See also ==
- List of film serials by year
- List of film serials by studio

| Preceded by The Lone Ranger Rides Again (1939) | Republic Serial; Daredevils of the Red Circle (1939) | Succeeded by Dick Tracy's G-Men (1939) |
| Preceded by The Lone Ranger Rides Again (1939) | Witney-English Serial; Daredevils of the Red Circle (1939) | Succeeded by Dick Tracy's G-Men (1939) |
