= Drums of Fu Manchu =

1940 film by John English, William Witney

- Directed by: William Witney; John English
- Written by: Franklin Adreon; Morgan B. Cox; Ronald Davidson; Norman S. Hall; Barney A. Sarecky; Sol Shor; Sax Rohmer (novel)
- Produced by: Hiram S. Brown Jr.
- Starring: Henry Brandon; William Royle; Robert Kellard; Gloria Franklin; Olaf Hytten; Tom Chatterton; Luana Walters
- Cinematography: William Nobles
- Edited by: William Thompson; Edward Todd
- Distributed by: Republic Pictures
- Release dates: March 15, 1940 (U.S. serial); November 27, 1943 (U.S. feature)
- Running time: 15 chapters / 269 minutes (serial); 69 minutes (feature)
- Country: United States
- Language: English
- Budget: $164,052 (negative cost: $166,312)

Drums of Fu Manchu (1940) is a 15-chapter Republic serial film based on the character created by Sax Rohmer. Though using the title of the ninth novel in the series, it actually is based on numerous elements from throughout the series to that point, cherry-picked by the writers. It starred Henry Brandon, William Royle and Robert Kellard. It was directed by the serial team of William Witney and John English and is often considered one of the best serial films ever made.

== Plot ==
Fu Manchu attempts to conquer the world by acquiring the sceptre of Genghis Khan, which will unite the people of Asia under his rule. Allan Parker allies himself with the traditional British literary nemeses of Fu Manchu, Sir Denis Nayland Smith and his associate, Dr. Flinders Petrie after his father is kidnapped and killed by Fu Manchu's dacoits.

== Cast ==
- Henry Brandon as Fu Manchu
- William Royle as Sir Denis Nayland Smith
- Robert Kellard as Allan Parker
- Luana Walters as Mary Randolph
- Olaf Hytten as Dr. Flinders Petrie
- Gloria Franklin as Fah Lo Suee
- Tom Chatterton as Professor Edward Randolph
- John Merton as Loki
- Dwight Frye as Professor Anderson
- Lal Chand Mehra as Sirdar Prahni

== Production ==
Drums of Fu Manchu was budgeted at $164,052 although the final negative cost was $166,312 (a $2,260, or 1.4%, overspend). It was the most expensive Republic serial of 1940, although this year was the first in which Republic's overall spending on serial production was less than in the previous year. Republic spent $597,528 producing serials in 1940 compared to $648,064 in 1939 (1939's total would not be beaten until the $782,204 of 1944). The studio produced four serials in each year, with the same mix of two 12-chapter serials and two 15-chapter serials.

The serial was filmed between December 22, 1939, and February 7, 1940, the longest filming period of any Republic serial. The serial's production number was 995.

Directors Witney and English, working with photographer William Nobles, stressed the elements of mystery in the plot over the usual action. Strong use of shadows was made with "the eeriest lighting possible falling upon Fu Manchu".

It was one of the very rare films made under the US Motion Picture Production Code to allow the villain to escape at the end. According to serial expert Alan Barbour, the Hays Office accepted the explanation that Fu Manchu always "got away" at the end of his novels to wreak further havoc in the next adventure, and Republic may well have been considering follow-ups.

== Release ==
Drums of Fu Manchu's official release date is March 15, 1940, although this is actually the date the seventh chapter was made available to film exchanges.

A 69-minute feature film version of the same name was created by editing the serial footage together and released on November 27, 1943. The feature version had the working titles Fu Manchu and Fu Manchu Strikes. It was one of fourteen feature films Republic made from their serials. This version changed the ending of the film. Fu Manchu's escape at the end is edited out and he dies in the final car crash instead. A similar change was made in the feature version of the Victory Pictures serial Shadow of Chinatown .

== Home media ==
The complete serial was released on region 1 DVD in the US by VCI Entertainment on February 25, 2003.

== Critical reception ==
Harmon and Glut regard Drums of Fu Manchu as one of Republic's best film serials.

Brandon as Fu Manchu is, in Cline's opinion, "a performance that stands alone".

Hans J. Wollstein, writing at Allmovie, concurs that Drums of Du Fu Manchu is "one of [Republic's] very best" serials. He does, however, note mistakes such as the misspelling of "Ghengis Khan" and Fu Manchu referring to Mary Randolph as "Miss Parker" but considers them part of the charm of the serial. In terms of acting, Brandon is a "compelling and strangely ageless fiend" while Kellard is "competent as the action hero". Witney and English are afforded the usual praise for their work.

== Influences ==
The influences on many similar serials and motion pictures cannot be overstated. Many similarities exist between Drums of Fu Manchu and the Indiana Jones saga, especially Raiders of the Lost Ark and Indiana Jones and the Temple of Doom.

== Chapter titles ==
1. Fu Manchu Strikes (29min 18s)
2. The Monster (17min 39s)
3. Ransom in the Sky (17min 38s)
4. The Pendulum of Doom (16min 49s)
5. The House of Terror (17min 23s)
6. Death Dials a Number (17min 43s)
7. Vengeance of the Si Fan (18min 15s)
8. Danger Trail (16min 48s)
9. The Crystal of Death (16min 54s)
10. Drums of Doom (17min 11s)
11. The Tomb of Genghis Khan (16min 59s)
12. Fire of Vengeance (16min 39s)
13. The Devil's Tattoo (16min 47s)
14. Satan's Surgeon (16min 40s)
15. Revolt! (16min 45s)

_{Source:}

This was one of Republic's two 15-chapter serials in 1940. The other was Mysterious Doctor Satan. Following their standard practice of 1938–1944, Republic also released two 12-chapter serials in this year, Adventures of Red Ryder and King of the Royal Mounted.

== See also ==
- List of film serials by year
- List of film serials by studio
- Yellow Peril

| Preceded by Zorro's Fighting Legion (1939) | Republic Serial; Drums of Fu Manchu (1940) | Succeeded by Adventures of Red Ryder (1940) |
| Preceded by Zorro's Fighting Legion (1939) | Witney-English Serial; Drums of Fu Manchu (1940) | Succeeded by Adventures of Red Ryder (1940) |
