= King of the Forest Rangers =

1946 film by Spencer Gordon Bennet, Fred C. Brannon

- Directed by: Spencer Gordon Bennet; Fred C. Brannon
- Written by: Albert DeMond; Basil Dickey; Jesse Duffy; Lynn Perkins
- Produced by: Ronald Davidson
- Starring: Larry Thompson; Helen Talbot; Stuart Hamblen; Anthony Warde; LeRoy Mason; Scott Elliott
- Cinematography: Bud Thackery
- Distributed by: Republic Pictures
- Release date: April 27, 1946 (U.S. serial)
- Running time: 12 chapters (167 minutes) (serial); 6 26½-minute episodes (TV)
- Country: United States
- Language: English
- Budget: $134,948 (negative cost: $137,320)

King of the Forest Rangers (1946) is a Republic film serial.

== Cast ==
- Larry Thompson as Forest Ranger Captain Steve King
- Helen Talbot as Marion Brennan
- Stuart Hamblen as Prof Carver
- Anthony Warde as Burt Spear
- LeRoy Mason as "Flush" Haliday
- Scott Elliott as Andrews/Bryan/Merkle/Sands

== Production ==
King of the Forest Rangers was budgeted at $134,948 although the final negative cost was $137,320 (a $2,372, or 1.8%, overspend). It was the cheapest Republic serial of 1946.

It was filmed between 27 September and 25 October 1945. The serial's production number was 1595.

Republic liked calling their heroes "King" in order to use the title "King of..." The studio had found success with this naming scheme following the adaptation of Zane Grey's King of the Royal Mounted.

=== Stunts ===
- Tom Steele as Forest Ranger Captain Steve King (doubling Larry Thompson)
- David Sharpe as Prof Carver (doubling Stuart Hamblen)
- Dale Van Sickel as Burt Spear (doubling Anthony Warde)
- Carey Loftin
- Eddie Parker
- Ken Terrell
- Sailor Vincent
- Bud Wolfe
- Joe Yrigoyen

=== Special effects ===
Special effects created by the Lydecker brothers.

== Release ==
=== Theatrical ===
King of the Forest Rangers' official release date is 27 April 1946, although this is actually the date the sixth chapter was made available to film exchanges.

=== Television ===
In the early 1950s, King of the Forest Rangers was one of fourteen Republic serials edited into a television series. It was broadcast in six 26½-minute episodes.

== Chapter titles ==
1. The Mystery of the Towers (20min)
2. Shattered Evidence (13min 20s)
3. Terror by Night (13min 20s)
4. Deluge of Destruction (13min 20s)
5. Pursuit into Peril (13min 20s)
6. Brink of Doom (13min 20s)
7. Design for Murder (13min 20s)
8. The Flying Coffin (13min 20s) - a re-cap chapter
9. S.O.S. Ranger (13min 20s)
10. The Death Detector (13min 20s)
11. The Flaming Pit (13min 20s)
12. Tower of Vengeance (13min 20s)

_{Source:}

== See also ==
- List of film serials by year
- List of film serials by studio
