= Daughter of Don Q =

1946 American film by Fred C. Brannon, Spencer Gordon Bennet

- Directed by: Spencer Gordon Bennet; Fred C. Brannon
- Written by: Albert DeMond; Basil Dickey; Jesse Duffy; Lynn Perkins
- Produced by: Ronald Davidson
- Starring: Lorna Gray; Kirk Alyn; LeRoy Mason; Roy Barcroft; Claire Meade; Kernan Cripps
- Cinematography: Bud Thackery
- Edited by: Cliff Bell Sr. Harold Minter
- Music by: Cy Feuer (director); Raoul Kraushaar (director); Mort Glickman
- Distributed by: Republic Pictures
- Release date: July 27, 1946
- Running time: 12 chapters / 167 minutes
- Country: United States
- Language: English
- Budget: $137,988 (negative cost: $140,156)

Daughter of Don Q (1946) is a Republic Movie serial. It combines elements of the B-Western genre with contemporary crime films, especially the popular "land grab" plot in which the villain attempts to steal apparently worthless land from the heroine (in this case) because he secretly knows it is worth a fortune. In this case, Dolores Quantero, is the rightful heir to extremely valuable metropolitan land which another family member, Carlos Manning, wants for himself.

== Plot ==
Delores Quantero is the descendant of Zorro-style hero, Don Quantero, who was granted land by the Spanish crown. This grant, which is still legally valid, now covers the business district of the city. Another descendant, Carlos Manning, has discovered the existence of this document and plots to inherit the fortune by murdering his relatives.

== Cast ==
- Lorna Gray as Dolores Quantero, heiress and heroine (billed as Adrian Booth)
- Kirk Alyn as Cliff Roberts, reporter aiding Dolores
- LeRoy Mason as Carlos Manning, villain
- Roy Barcroft as Mel Donovan
- Claire Meade as Marie Martinez
- Kernan Cripps as Inspector Grogan
- Jimmy Ames as Romero
- Eddie Parker in multiple small roles including "Store Clerk" and "Henchman"
- Tom Steele in multiple small roles including "Streetsweep" and "Bomb thug"

== Production ==
Daughter of Don Q was budgeted at $137,988 although the final negative cost was $140,156 (a $2,168, or 1.6%, overspend).

At 1.6% overbudget this was low for a Republic serial, with an average over all 66 of 5.7% over and especially considering the subsequent serial, The Crimson Ghost, would exceed its budget by 16.9%. Although budgeted to be the most expensive Republic serial of 1946, The Crimson Ghost took that title with its final negative cost of $161,174.

It was filmed between January 3 and 30, 1946. The serial's production number was 1596.

=== Special effects ===
Special effects by the Lydecker brothers

== Release ==
=== Theatrical ===
Daughter of Don Q's official release date is July 27, 1946, although this is actually the date the sixth chapter was made available to film exchanges.

== Chapter titles ==
1. Multiple Murder (20min)
2. Vendetta (13min 20s)
3. Under the Knives (13min 20s)
4. Race to Destruction (13min 20s)
5. Blackout (13min 20s)
6. Forged Evidence (13min 20s)
7. Execution by Error (13min 20s)
8. Window to Death (13min 20s) – a re-cap chapter
9. The Juggernaut (13min 20s)
10. Cremation (13min 20s)
11. Glass Guillotine (13min 20s)
12. Dead Man's Vengeance (13min 20s)

_{Source:}

Note: All serials produced by Republic in 1946 were 12 chapters long and this was the first year that no 15-chapter serials were produced by the serial. Almost all future Republic serials would follow this 12-chapter limit until the last was released in 1955.

== See also ==
- List of film serials by year
- List of film serials by studio

Preceded by King of the Forest Rangers (1946)	Republic Serial; Daughter of Don Q (1946)	Succeeded by The Crimson Ghost (1946)
