= Sons of Adventure =

1948 film by Yakima Canutt

- Theatrical release poster
- Directed by: Yakima Canutt
- Screenplay by: Franklin Adreon; Sol Shor
- Produced by: Franklin Adreon
- Starring: Lynne Roberts; Russell Hayden; Gordon Jones; Grant Withers; George Chandler; Roy Barcroft
- Cinematography: John MacBurnie
- Edited by: Harold Minter
- Production company: Republic Pictures
- Distributed by: Republic Pictures
- Release date: September 1, 1948
- Running time: 60 minutes
- Country: United States
- Language: English

Sons of Adventure is a 1948 American Western film directed by Yakima Canutt, written by Franklin Adreon and Sol Shor, and starring Lynne Roberts, Russell Hayden, Gordon Jones, Grant Withers, George Chandler and Roy Barcroft. It was released on September 1, 1948 by Republic Pictures.

== Cast ==
- Lynne Roberts as Jean
- Russell Hayden as Steve Malone
- Gordon Jones as Andy Baldwin
- Grant Withers as J.L. Sterling
- George Chandler as Billy Wilkes
- Roy Barcroft as Leslie Bennett
- John Newland as Peter Winslow
- Stephanie Bachelor as Laura Gifford
- John Holland as Paul Kenyon
- Gil Frye as Sam Hodges
- Richard Irving as Eddie
- Joan Blair as Glenda
- John Crawford as George Norton
- Keith Richards as Harry
- James Dale as Whitey
