= Paul Thatcher =

Paul Thatcher may refer to:

- Paul Thatcher, candidate in Portsmouth Council election, 2003
- Paul Thatcher, character in The Adventures of Frank and Jesse James
