= Adventures of Frank and Jesse James =

1948 film by Fred C. Brannon, Yakima Canutt

- Directed by: Fred C. Brannon; Yakima Canutt
- Written by: Franklin Adreon; Basil Dickey; Sol Shor
- Produced by: Franklin Adreon
- Starring: Clayton Moore; Steve Darrell; Noel Neill; George J. Lewis; John Crawford; Sam Flint
- Cinematography: John MacBurnie
- Distributed by: Republic Pictures
- Release date: October 30, 1948
- Running time: 13 chapters / 180 minutes (serial)
- Budget: $149,985 (negative cost: $149,805)

Adventures of Frank and Jesse James is a 1948 Republic film serial directed by Fred C. Brannon and Yakima Canutt and starring Clayton Moore, Steve Darrell, Noel Neill, George J. Lewis, John Crawford, and Sam Flint.

== Cast ==
- Clayton Moore as Jesse James a.k.a. John Howard
- Steve Darrell as Frank James a.k.a. Bob Carroll
- Noel Neill as Judy Powell
- George J. Lewis as Rafe Henley
- John Crawford as Amos Ramsey
- Sam Flint as Paul Thatcher
- Lane Bradford as Henchman Bill

== Production ==
Adventures of Frank and Jesse James was budgeted at $149,985 although the final negative cost was $149,805 (a $180, or 0.1%, under spend). It was the cheapest Republic serial of 1948, despite having one more chapter than the other two serials.

It was filmed between 5 April and 26 April 1948. The serial's production number was 1700.

This was the fourth of only four 13-chapter serials to be released by Republic. The previous three were released in 1947, the only original serials released in that year.

== Release ==
=== Theatrical ===
Adventures of Frank and Jesse James' official release date is 30 October 1948, although this is actually the date the sixth chapter was made available to film exchanges.

This was followed by a re-release of Darkest Africa, re-titled as King of Jungleland, instead of a new serial. The next new serial, Federal Agents vs. Underworld, Inc., followed in 1949.

The serial was re-released on 16 April 1956 between the similar re-releases of Manhunt of Mystery Island and King of the Rocket Men. The last original Republic serial release was King of the Carnival in 1955.

== Stunts ==
- Tom Steele as Jesse James (doubling Clayton Moore)
- Dale Van Sickel as Rafe Henley (doubling George J. Lewis)

== Special effects ==
- Lydecker brothers

== Chapter titles ==
1. Agent of Treachery (20min)
2. The Hidden Witness (13min 20s)
3. The Lost Tunnel (13min 20s)
4. Blades of Death (13min 20s)
5. Roaring Wheels (13min 20s)
6. Passage to Danger (13min 20s)
7. The Secret Code (13min 20s)
8. Doomed Cargo (13min 20s)
9. The Eyes of the Law (13min 20s)
10. The Stolen Body (13min 20s)
11. Suspicion/The Death Trap (13min 20s) - a re-cap chapter
12. Talk or Die! (13min 20s)
13. Unmasked (13min 20s)

_{Source:}

== See also ==
- List of film serials by year
- List of film serials by studio
- Jesse James Rides Again (1947) - earlier Jesse James serial
- The James Brothers of Missouri (1949) - later Jesse James serial

Preceded by Dangers of the Canadian Mounted (1948)	Republic Serial; Adventures of Frank and Jesse James (1948)	Succeeded by Federal Agents vs. Underworld, Inc (1949)
