= Federal Agents vs. Underworld, Inc =

1949 film by Fred C. Brannon

Federal Agents vs. Underworld, Inc.
- Directed by: Fred C. Brannon
- Written by: Royal K Cole; Basil Dickey; William Lively; Sol Shor
- Produced by: Franklin Adreon
- Starring: Kirk Alyn; Rosemary La Planche; Roy Barcroft; Carol Forman
- Cinematography: John MacBurnie
- Music by: Stanley Wilson
- Distributed by: Republic Pictures
- Release date: January 29, 1949 (U.S. serial)
- Running time: 12 chapters / 167 minutes (serial); 100 minutes (TV)
- Country: United States
- Language: English
- Budget: $156,120 (negative cost: $155,807)

Federal Agents vs. Underworld, Inc. (1949) is a 12-episode black-and-white film serial produced by Republic Pictures during July 1948 and released in January 1949, an original screenplay written collaboratively by Royal K. Cole, Basil Dickey, William Lively and Sol Shor as a crime story with elements of "the mysterious Orient" incorporated in the plot.

== Plot ==
Nila, an Abistahnian criminal, and Spade Gordon, an American gangster, conspire to form a super-mob dubbed Underworld, Incorporated, funded by the treasure of Kurigal I of Abistahn, instructions for the location of which are contained in hieroglyphics written on two golden statues in the shape of hands, found in Kurigal's tomb. When the professor in charge of the tomb's dig disappears under mysterious circumstances while translating the writing on one of the hands back at his American office, a team of special government agents led by David Worth and his aide Steve Evans, assisted by the professor's aide Laura Keith, set out to find the professor and the now-missing hands. The criminals manage to get possession of one of the Hands, but they need both of them to recreate the treasure map.

== Cast ==
- Kirk Alyn as Inspector David Worth
- Rosemary LaPlanche as Laura Keith
- Roy Barcroft as Spade Gordon
- Carol Forman as Nila
- James Dale as Agent Steve Evans
- Bruce Edwards as Prof Paul Williams
- James Craven as Prof James Clayton
- Tristram Coffin as Frank Chambers

== Production ==
Federal Agents vs. Underworld, Inc. was budgeted at $156,120 although the final negative cost was $155,807 (a $313, or 0.2%, under spend). It was the cheapest Republic serial of 1949.

It was filmed between 6 July and 27 July 1948 under the working title Crime Fighters vs. Underworld, Inc. The serial's production number was 1701.

=== Stunts ===
- Tom Steele as Inspector David Worth/Spade Gordon/Frank Chambers (doubling Kirk Alyn, Roy Barcroft & Tristram Coffin)
- Dale Van Sickel as Inspector David Worth/Prof Paul Williams (doubling Kirk Alyn & Bruce Edwards)
- John Daheim as Agent Steve Evans (doubling James Dale)

=== Special Effects ===
The special effects in this serial were created by the Howard & Theodore Lydecker, Republic's in-house effect team.

== Release ==
=== Theatrical ===
Federal Agents vs. Underworld, Inc.'s official release date is January 29, 1949, although this is actually the date the sixth chapter was made available to film exchanges.

=== Television ===
Federal Agents vs. Underworld, Inc. was one of twenty-six Republic serials re-released as a film on television in 1966. The title of the film was changed to Golden Hands of Kurigal. This version was cut down to 100-minutes in length.

== Chapter titles ==
Thirteen minutes and 20 seconds long, unless otherwise specified

1. The Golden Hands (20 minutes)
2. Criminals' Lair
3. Death in Disguise
4. Fatal Evidence
5. The Trapped Conspirator
6. Wheels of Disaster
7. The Hidden Key
8. The Enemy's Mouthpiece
9. The Stolen Hand
10. Unmasked - a re-cap chapter
11. Tombs of the Ancients
12. The Curse of Kurigal

_{Source:}

== See also ==
- List of film serials by year
- List of film serials by studio

Preceded by Adventures of Frank and Jesse James (1948)	Republic Serial; Federal Agents vs. Underworld, Inc. (1949)	Succeeded by Ghost of Zorro (1949)
