= The Crimson Ghost =

1946 American film serial directed by Fred C. Brannon and William Witney

- Promotional release poster
- Directed by: Fred C. Brannon; William Witney
- Written by: Albert DeMond; Basil Dickey; Jesse Duffy; Sol Shor
- Produced by: Ronald Davidson
- Starring: Charles Quigley; Linda Stirling; Clayton Moore; I. Stanford Jolley
- Cinematography: Bud Thackery
- Production company: Republic Pictures
- Distributed by: Republic Pictures
- Release date: October 26, 1946 (serial)
- Running time: 167 minutes (12 chapters); 100 minutes (edited Cyclotrode "X" version)
- Country: United States
- Language: English
- Budget: $161,174

The Crimson Ghost is a 1946 American film serial directed by Fred C. Brannon and William Witney. Produced by Republic Pictures and written by Albert DeMond, Basil Dickey, Jesse Duffy, and Sol Shor, it was the last serial directed by Witney. It is divided into twelve chapters and stars Charles Quigley as a criminologist who attempts to thwart the efforts of the eponymous villain to steal a device that can render electrical devices powerless. The serial also stars Linda Stirling, Clayton Moore, and I. Stanford Jolley.

In the 1950s, the serial was re-edited as a six-episode television series, and in 1966, it was re-edited and re-released as a television film titled Cyclotrode "X". By the 1990s, The Crimson Ghost was one of two Republic serials to be colorized.

The serial's titular villain, the Crimson Ghost, has become a pop-culture icon due to the punk rock band Misfits having adapted his skull-like visage into their iconography.

== Plot ==
The masked Crimson Ghost is determined to steal the Cyclotrode X, a device designed to repel atomic bomb attacks and that can disable electrical devices. Its inventor, university professor Dr. Chambers, demonstrates its powers at a faculty meeting by having it detect and fell a model airplane. After the meeting, two of the Ghost's henchmen attempt to steal the device, but Chambers destroys it to prevent them from doing so. Criminologist Duncan Richards, a colleague of Chambers, arrives and fights the henchmen. One of them, Ashe, escapes, and the other is killed when a collar around his neck is removed. Chambers informs his fellow professors—Richards, Anderson, Van Wyck, Maxwell, and Parker—that a duplicate Cyclotrode is located in a bonded warehouse.

Chambers finds himself in the mansion hideout of the Ghost, who tells Chambers that he is one of his fellow professors and forces him to wear a collar that will compel him to do his will and is designed to kill the wearer if forcefully removed. Chambers, under the Ghost's control, retrieves the duplicate Cyclotrode from the warehouse. Richards pursues them by car. The Ghost commands Chambers to use the Cyclotrode to impede Richards' car, and Richards narrowly avoids being sent hurtling off a cliff.

Back in his mansion hideout, the Ghost relieves Chambers of his influence and tells him to make a larger, more powerful Cyclotrode that could cripple entire cities. Instead, Chambers builds a death ray and sets it as a trap. Richards finds his way to the lair and almost steps into the path of the death ray; Chambers leaps forward to stop him and is killed by the weapon. Upon learning of Chambers' death, the Ghost decides to build a larger Cyclotrode himself.

After unsuccessfully attempting to steal heavy water (a compound integral to the Cyclotrode's operation) and a truckload of refined uranium (an ingredient he would need to make heavy water himself), the Ghost has his henchmen capture Diana, a secretary who has been assisting Richards in his efforts to combat them. The Ghost places a control collar on her, and she returns to the university. Richards notices the collar around her neck, and attempts to remove it with the help of a doctor and a nurse. Richards is able to remove the collar without killing Diana, and discovers that the doctor who is present is actually Ashe in disguise.

Ashe manages to escape, and flees by car to the Ghost's mountain hideout. There, in a laboratory, scientist Bain has devised a way to make heavy water without uranium. Richards tracks them down to the hideout, and a fight ensues. A fire breaks out, and the Ghost and Ashe escape with a supply of heavy water. At the next faculty meeting, Richards announces that the wreckage of the Ghost's laboratory equipment has been hauled to a warehouse and will be checked for fingerprints. Richards reveals to Diana that he does not actually intend for the wreckage to be checked for fingerprints, with his actual goal being to catch the Ghost.

At the warehouse, Richards and Diana find Professor Van Wyck, and wrongly assume him to be the Ghost. The real Ghost arrives and Van Wyck is killed in the melee. With Professor Anderson and Van Wyck now dead, Richards determines that either Maxwell or Parker must be the Ghost. Richards and Diana use a dog to track Ashe to the Ghost's mansion hideout. Richards enters the estate, where the Ghost and his henchmen have constructed a larger Cyclotrode. Richards shoots the device and unmasks the Ghost. Back at the university, the captured Crimson Ghost is revealed to be Professor Parker.

== Cast ==
- Charles Quigley as Professor Duncan Richards, a criminologist and physicist.
- Linda Stirling as Diana Farnsworth, a secretary who assists Richards in his efforts to combat the Crimson Ghost.
- Clayton Moore as Ashe, a gangster and the Crimson Ghost's chief henchman.
- I. Stanford Jolley as Doctor Blackton, a psychologist who is forced by the Crimson Ghost into impersonating another psychologist hired by Duncan to assist him.
  - Jolley also provides the voice of the Crimson Ghost.
- Kenne Duncan as Dr. Chambers, a university professor and the inventor of the Cyclotrode device.
- Forrest Taylor as Professor Van Wyck, one of the professors at the university.
- Emmett Vogan as Professor Anderson, one of the professors at the university.
- Sam Flint as Professor Maxwell, one of the professors at the university.
- Joseph Forte as Professor Parker, the university professor revealed to be the Crimson Ghost.
- Stanley Price as Count Fator, a representative of an unnamed foreign power that the Crimson Ghost intends to sell the Cyclotrode to.

Bud Geary portrays the Crimson Ghost in-costume. Rex Lease plays Bain, a scientist working for the Crimson Ghost. Virginia Carroll plays a nurse.

== Chapter titles ==
1. Atomic Peril
2. Thunderbolt
3. The Fatal Sacrifice
4. The Laughing Skull
5. Flaming Death
6. Mystery of the Mountain
7. Electrocution
8. The Slave Collar
9. Blazing Fury
10. The Trap That Failed
11. Double Murder
12. The Invisible Trail

== Production ==
The Crimson Ghost was budgeted at $137,912, although the final negative cost was $161,174 (a $23,262, or 16.9%, overspend). It was the most expensive Republic serial of 1946. It was reportedly filmed between March 28 and April 24, 1946 under the working title The Scarlet Shadow. The serial's production number was 1597.

In order to prevent the audience deducing the identity of the Crimson Ghost, I. Stanford Jolley, who portrayed the character Doctor Blackton on-screen, provided the voice of the Ghost. Jolley received fourth-billing and was therefore highly suspect. When the Crimson Ghost was unmasked in the twelfth and final chapter, he proved to be yet another actor entirely, Joseph Forte, who played Professor Parker.

The Crimson Ghost was director William Witney's last serial. His first was The Painted Stallion in 1937 and prior to this production had temporarily left the serial business to serve in World War II.

== Release ==
=== Theatrical ===
The Crimson Ghost's official release date is considered October 26, 1946, the date that the sixth chapter was made available to film exchanges.

=== Television ===
In the early 1950s, The Crimson Ghost was one of fourteen Republic serials edited into a television series. It was broadcast in six 26½-minute episodes. The Crimson Ghost was one of twenty-six Republic serials re-released as a film on television in 1966. The title of the film was changed to Cyclotrode "X". This version was cut down to 100 minutes in length. The Crimson Ghost was one of two Republic serials to be colorized in the 1990s.

== Critical reception ==
Hans J. Wollstein of AllMovie gave The Crimson Ghost a rating of three out of five stars, calling it "one of the most entertaining serials to be released by Republic Pictures". Author William C. Cline praised the serial's eponymous antagonist as "a most striking and visually fascinating villain". Similarly, author Roy Kinnard praised the design of the Crimson Ghost's costume, and called the character "one of the single greatest menaces in serial history." Writing of the serial as a whole, Kinnard commented that "Although The Crimson Ghost is a slick, well-made serial, it suffers from the same overall blandness that afflicted most Republic serial from the mid-'40s on."

== Legacy ==
The Crimson Ghost is popularly known as part of the iconography of the punk rock band Misfits. The Misfits first made use of the character's likeness in a flyer promoting one of their gigs on March 28, 1979 at Max's Kansas City, after vocalist Glenn Danzig and bassist Jerry Only came across a picture of the Crimson Ghost while searching for images to silkscreen on T-shirts. The band later incorporated an image of the Ghost on the cover artwork of their single "Horror Business", first released on June 26, 1979. The Crimson Ghost became a recognizable mascot and logo for the band throughout their career, and has become somewhat of a pop culture icon as a result. Oddly enough, the original owners, Republic Pictures, did not sue the band for copyright infringement, possibly because the assets changed hands several times, making enforcement messy, and the fact the film went into public domain.

Iron Maiden have also used The Crimson Ghost in their "The Number of the Beast" music video.

Full motion video clips from The Crimson Ghost serial were used in the Philips CD-i video game Jack Sprite vs. The Crimson Ghost, released by OlderGames in 2002. The gameplay involved watching clips from the serial and injecting the Jack Sprite character into the scene At certain times for fighting levels, with the Crimson Ghost acting as a boss character.

== See also ==
- List of film serials by year
- List of film serials by studio

Preceded by Daughter of Don Q (1946)	Republic Serial; The Crimson Ghost (1946)	Succeeded by Son of Zorro (1947)
