= The James Brothers of Missouri =

1946 film by Fred C. Brannon

- Directed by: Fred C. Brannon
- Written by: Royal Cole; William Lively; Sol Shor
- Produced by: Franklin Adreon
- Starring: Keith Richards; Robert Bice; Noel Neill; Roy Barcroft; Patricia Knox; Lane Bradford
- Cinematography: Ellis W. Carter
- Music by: Stanley Wilson
- Distributed by: Republic Pictures
- Release date: August 31, 1949 (U.S.)
- Running time: 12 chapters / 167 minutes
- Country: United States
- Language: English
- Budget: $164,986 (negative cost: $164,757)

The James Brothers of Missouri is a 1949 American Republic Western film serial. Frank and Jesse James attempt to assist a young woman who inherited a gold mine from her murdered father, and now his murderers are trying to scare her off so they can take control of the mine.

== Cast ==
- Keith Richards as Jesse James
- Robert Bice as Frank James
- Noel Neill as Peg Royer
- Roy Barcroft as Ace Marlin
- Patricia Knox as Belle Calhoun
- Lane Bradford as Monk Tucker

== Production ==
The James Brothers of Missouri was budgeted at $164,986 although the final negative cost was $164,757 (a $229, or 0.1%, under spend).

It was filmed between 6 July and 27 July 1949. The serial's production number was 1705.

=== Stunts ===
- David Sharpe
- Tom Steele
- Dale Van Sickel

=== Special effects ===
Special effects were created by the Lydecker brothers.

== Release ==
=== Theatrical ===
The James Brothers of Missouri's official release date is 31 August 1949, although this is actually the date the sixth chapter was made available to film exchanges.

== Critical reception ==
William C. Cline, author of In the Nick of Time: Motion Picture Sound Serials, dismisses this serial as a "quick warm-over" of the first two Jesse James serials.

== Chapter titles ==
1. Frontier Renegades (20min)
2. Racing Peril (13min 20s)
3. Danger Road (13min 20s)
4. Murder at Midnight (13min 20s)
5. Road to Oblivion (13min 20s)
6. Missouri Manhunt (13min 20s)
7. Hangman's Noose (13min 20s)
8. Coffin on Wheels (13min 20s)
9. Dead Man's Return (13min 20s)
10. Galloping Gunslingers (13min 20s) - a re-cap chapter
11. The Haunting Past (13min 20s)
12. Fugitive's Code (13min 20s)

_{Source:}

== See also ==
- Jesse James Rides Again (1947) - earlier Jesse James serial
- Adventures of Frank and Jesse James (1948) - earlier Jesse James serial
- List of film serials by year
- List of film serials by studio

Preceded by King of the Rocket Men (1949)	Republic Serial; The James Brothers of Missouri (1949)	Succeeded by Radar Patrol vs Spy King (1949)
