= Basil Dickey =

American screenwriter (1880–1958)

- Born: November 23, 1880; Chicago, Illinois
- Died: June 17, 1958 (aged 77); Long Beach, California
- Years active: 1916–1958

Basil Dickey (November 23, 1880 – June 17, 1958) was an American screenwriter. He wrote for more than 140 films between 1916 and 1958. He was born in Illinois and died in Long Beach, California. His brother was playwright and screenwriter Paul Dickey.

== Selected filmography ==
- The Secret Kingdom (1916)
- In Search of a Thrill (1923)
- Driftin' Thru (1926)
- The Frontier Trail (1926)
- Wolf's Trail (1927)
- A Final Reckoning (1928)
- Thunder Riders (1928)
- The Fearless Rider (1928)
- The Ridin' Demon (1929)
- The Tip Off (1929)
- The Lost Special (1932)
- The Secrets of Wu Sin (1932)
- The New Adventures of Tarzan (1935)
- Flash Gordon (1936)
- The Spider's Web (1938)
- Flash Gordon Conquers the Universe (1940)
- Daredevils of the West (1943)
- Secret Service in Darkest Africa (1943)
- The Masked Marvel (1943)
- Captain America (1944)
- Haunted Harbor (1944)
- Zorro's Black Whip (1944)
- Manhunt of Mystery Island (1945)
- Federal Operator 99 (1945)
- The Purple Monster Strikes (1945)
- The Phantom Rider (1946)
- King of the Forest Rangers (1946)
- Daughter of Don Q (1946)
- The Crimson Ghost (1946)
- Son of Zorro (1947)
- Jesse James Rides Again (1947)
- The Black Widow (1947)
- G-Men Never Forget (1948)
- Dangers of the Canadian Mounted (1948)
- Adventures of Frank and Jesse James (1948)
- The Rangers Ride (1948)
- Brand of Fear (1949)
- Federal Agents vs. Underworld, Inc (1949)
