= King of the Royal Mounted (serial) =

1940 film by John English, William Witney

- Directed by: William Witney; John English
- Written by: Franklin Adreon; Norman S. Hall; Joseph F. Poland; Barney A. Sarecky; Sol Shor
- Produced by: Hiram S. Brown Jr.
- Starring: Allan Lane; Robert Strange; Robert Kellard; Lita Conway; Herbert Rawlinson; Harry Cording; Bryant Washburn; Budd Buster
- Cinematography: William Nobles
- Distributed by: Republic Pictures
- Release dates: September 20, 1940 (U.S. serial); April 30, 1942 (U.S. feature)
- Running time: 12 chapters (211 minutes) (serial); 68 minutes (feature)
- Country: United States
- Language: English
- Budget: $136,686 (negative cost: $137,874)

King of the Royal Mounted (1940) is a Republic Pictures northern serial based on the King of the Royal Mounted comic strip directed by William Witney and John English.

Set and filmed during World War II, the story is about the Royal Canadian Mounted Police against unnamed enemy spies (the United States was then not at war) after a new Canadian discovery, "Compound X".

A feature version, called The Yukon Patrol was released in 1942.

== Plot ==
Although the Royal Canadian Mounted Police are few in number, they successfully guard a vast dominion of the British Empire. From the United States border to the Arctic ice pack and from the Atlantic to the Pacific, the red coat of the Mountie is the symbol of law and order and a promise that justice will prevail. To these gallant men, "King of the Royal Mounted" is respectfully dedicated.

— Opening caption

In World War II, an unnamed enemy require a special mineral, Compound X, discovered in Canada. Although intended to cure paralysis, the enemy has discovered that it can be used in magnetic mines to destroy the British fleet and blockade America to prevent it assisting the Allies. The Mounties discover this plot and work to defeat and capture the spies sent to obtain the ore. Sgt King's father is killed in the line of duty, saving his son from death on a circular saw, and leaving him to carry on the fight against the enemy.

The plot was described as "pure and simple propaganda" by William Witney.

== Cast ==
- Allan Lane as Sergeant Dave King
- Robert Strange as John Kettler. Strange's performance is described by Cline as "a flawless characterisation".
- Robert Kellard as Corporal Tom Merritt Jr
- Lita Conway as Linda Merritt
- Herbert Rawlinson as Inspector King
- Harry Cording as Wade Garson
- Bryant Washburn as Matt Crandall
- Budd Buster as Vinegar Smith

== Production ==
King of the Royal Mounted was budgeted at $136,686 although the final negative cost was $137,874 (a $1,188, or 0.9%, overspend). It was the cheapest Republic serial of 1940 which was the first year in which Republic's overall spending on serial production was less than in the previous year. It was filmed between 18 June and 12 July 1940. The serial's production number was 998.

Republic found success with this naming scheme following this adaptation and subsequently liked calling their heroes "King" in order to use the title "King of ..." It even led the studio to name Roy Rogers "King of the Cowboys".

Director William Witney records that production of the serial was not pleasant. Although the interview for the leading man went well, neither Witney nor his partner John English subsequently had a high opinion of Allan Lane as a person or as an actor. The serial is only afforded three pages in the autobiography of his serial-years, in a chapter entitled "Two Duds and a Hot Water Tank".

Filming took place on location, following a good weather forecast from a Doctor Krich at Caltech, at Big Bear Lake. The area had a log cabin settlement and a disguised dam (logs covering concrete) built by Paramount Pictures for The Trail of the Lonesome Pine (1936). The area also had the pine trees necessary for the Canadian setting.

== Release ==
=== Theatrical ===
King of the Royal Mounted's official release date is 20 September 1940, although this is actually the date the sixth chapter was made available to film exchanges.

A 68-minute feature film version, created by editing the serial footage together, was released on 30 April 1940 under the title The Yukon Patrol. It was one of fourteen feature films Republic made from their serials.

== Chapter titles ==
1. Manhunt (26 min 48s)
2. Winged Death (17 min 6s)
3. Boomerang (16 min 45s)
4. Devil Doctor (16 min 45s)
5. Sabotage (16 min 51s)
6. False Ransom (16 min 42s)
7. Death Tunes In (16 min 43s)
8. Satan's Cauldron (16 min 40s)
9. Espionage (16 min 43s)
10. Blazing Guns (16 min 41s)
11. Master Spy (16 min 50s)
12. Code of the Mounted (16 min 40s)

_{Source:}
