= King of the Carnival =

1955 film by Franklin Adreon

- Directed by: Franklin Adreon
- Written by: Ronald Davidson
- Produced by: Franklin Adreon
- Starring: Harry Lauter; Fran Bennett; Keith Richards; Robert Shayne; Gregory Gay; Rick Vallin; Robert Clarke
- Cinematography: Bud Thackery
- Distributed by: Republic Pictures
- Release date: June 27, 1955 (U.S.)
- Running time: 12 chapters (167 minutes)
- Country: United States
- Language: English
- Budget: $172,995 (negative cost: $177,050)

King of the Carnival is a 1955 Republic movie serial that contains stock footage from the 1939 Republic serial Daredevils of the Red Circle. It is the 66th and final serial produced by Republic and is often considered to be among the studio's weakest. The plot concerns treasury agents investigating a Cold War counterfeiting operation believed to be connected to a circus.

== Plot ==
Treasury agents Art Kerr and Jim Haynes are investigating a global counterfeiting operation believed to be linked to the circus. Acrobat Bert King agrees to help his old friend Art search for the counterfeiters, and his acrobatic partner June Edwards assists him. They are repeatedly threatened by two thugs, Daley and Travis.

Early evidence leads Bert and June to a cave that leads to an isolated beach and contains gear belonging to the gang. They are unaware that in a minisub off the shoreline hides Zorn, the counterfeiter who is printing the phony bills. However, the evidence points to an unknown, higher authority directing the operations, and indeed someone connected with the circus. Among the circus staff who act suspiciously are a clown named Burton and three rubes.

After several false turns, ringmaster Jess Carter is exposed as the counterfeit gang leader and Zorn's handler. Carter attempts to flee from the agents, but falls from the trapeze swing and breaks his neck. With the criminals' ringleader dead, the counterfeit operation is hastily shut down by the U.S. Treasury.

== Cast ==
=== Principal players ===
- Harry Lauter as Bert King, acrobat and former paratrooper
- Fran Bennett as June Edwards, acrobat
- Keith Richards as Daley, henchman
- Terry Frost as Travis, henchman
- Robert Shayne as Jess Carter, circus ringmaster
- Rick Vallin as Agent Art Kerr, a T-man (Treasury agent) and former paratrooper
- Robert Clarke as Agent Jim Hayes, a T-man (Treasury agent)
- Gregory Gay as Zorn, agent of a foreign power
- Lee Roberts as Hank
- Mauritz Hugo as Sam, Sideshow barker and henchman
- Chris Mitchell as Bill
- Stuart Whitman as Mac, acrobat
- Tom Steele as Matt Winston, acrobat
- George DeNormand as Garth

== Production ==
King of the Carnival was budgeted at $172,995 although the final negative cost was $177,050 (an overspend of $4,055, or 2.3%). It was the cheapest Republic serial of 1955.

Under the working title King of the Circus (production number 1800), the production was filmed between March 8 and March 25 of 1955; its 17 days of production marked the shortest schedule of all Republic serials.

Republic would often name its films' heroes King in order to use the title "King of..." The studio had found success with this approach following the adaptation of Zane Grey's King of the Royal Mounted.

Though Republic serials traditionally employed many stuntmen, this serial required only two: Tom Steele and George DeNormand.

The film's special effects were created by the team of Howard and Theodore Lydecker.

== Release ==
=== Theatrical ===
King of the Carnival's official release date was June 27, 1955, although that is actually the date when the sixth chapter was made available to film exchanges.

This was the last new serial released by Republic. The studio then re-released old serials until March 1958, beginning with a reissue of Dick Tracy's G-Men and ending with a reprint of Zorro's Fighting Legion.

== Reception ==
By the mid-1950s trade publications had largely stopped reviewing serials, but The Exhibitor sampled the first chapter: "The first chapter ends with attempted sabotage to the aerial act performing high over a cage of lions. The action is here, if little else, although the combination of the tanbark with counterfeiting activities is a curious one, to say the least. Serial spots should find it okeh [sic]."

== Chapter titles ==
1. Daredevils of the Air (20:00)
2. Death Takes the Wheel (13:20)
3. The Trap that Failed (13:20)
4. Operation Murder (13:20)
5. The Mechanical Bloodhound (13:20)
6. Undersea Peril (13:20)
7. High Hazard (13:20)
8. Death Alley (13:20)
9. Cave of Doom (13:20)
10. The Masked Executioner (13:20) (recap chapter)
11. Undersea Warfare (13:20)
12. Vengeance Under the Big Top (13:20)

== See also ==
- List of American films of 1955
- List of film serials by year
- List of film serials by studio
