= The Invisible Monster =

1950 film by Fred C. Brannon

- Directed by: Fred C. Brannon
- Written by: Ronald Davison
- Produced by: Franklin Adreon
- Starring: Richard Webb; Aline Towne; Lane Bradford; Stanley Price; John Crawford; George Meeker
- Cinematography: Ellis W. Carter
- Music by: Stanley Wilson
- Distributed by: Republic Pictures
- Release date: May 10, 1950
- Running time: 12 chapters / 167 minutes (serial); 100 minutes (TV)
- Language: English
- Budget: $153,070 (negative cost: $119,343)

The Invisible Monster is a 1950 Republic film serial, starring Richard Webb and Aline Towne.

== Plot ==
A would-be dictator and scientist, known only as The Phantom Ruler, has developed a formula which, when sprayed on some solid object, renders that object and everything it contains invisible when exposed to rays emitted by a special lamp, also his own invention. Covered from head to toe in formula-treated cloth, he thus moves about unseen, presently with the objective of stealing enough money and formula components to render an entire army of willing followers invisible. Two henchmen assist him, along with several illegal aliens smuggled into the US by him and used to infiltrate, as employees, possible sites for him to later rob while invisible. When he successfully robs a bank vault, an investigator from the bank's insurer teams up with a woman police detective to solve the mystery of the money which to all outside appearances has just vanished. Tracking clues and interrupting other attempts by the Phantom Ruler to commit crimes, the protagonists round up enough evidence that they are not merely dealing with an ordinary crime ring. Eventually they discover the invisibility fluid and lamp, and the Phantom Ruler is killed when he trips over an open high-power electric cable he had laid on the floor of his den to do in the forces of law and order closing in upon him.

== Cast ==
- Richard Webb as Lane Carson
- Aline Towne as Carol Richards
- Lane Bradford as Burton
- Stanley Price as The Phantom Ruler. The villain of the serial uses the trappings of the Mystery Villain but his identity is revealed to the audience in the first chapter.
- John Crawford as Harrison
- George Meeker as Harry Long

== Production ==
The Invisible Monster was budgeted at $153,070 although the final negative cost was $152,115 (a $955, or 0.6%, under spend).

It was filmed between March 7 and 30, 1950 under the working title The Phantom Ruler. The serial's production number was 1707.

=== Stunts ===
- Tom Steele as Lane Carson (doubling Richard Webb)
- Dale Van Sickel as Harry Long (doubling George Meeker)

=== Special effects ===
Special effects created by the Lydecker brothers.

== Release ==
=== Theatrical ===
The Invisible Monster's official release date is May 10, 1950, although this is actually the date the sixth chapter was made available to film exchanges.

=== Television ===
The Invisible Monster was one of twenty-six Republic serials edited to a uniform runtime of 100 minutes and syndicated directly to television as a package of TV Movies in 1966. The title of this new version was Slaves of the Invisible Monster.

== Critical reception ==
Cline describes this serial as just a "quickie." In Creature Feature, this movie serial was given three out of five stars, stating that the movie villain is incredibly inept and rarely uses his creation intelligently, and that the entire series is naive, but that there was an underlying sense of non-stop fun.

== Chapters ==
The Invisible Monster has 12 chapters. The first chapter is 20 minutes long, and each one thereafter is 13 minutes, 20 seconds. Chapter 10, "High Voltage Danger", is a recap of all previous episodes.

1. Slaves of the Phantom
2. The Acid Clue
3. The Death Car
4. Highway Holocaust
5. Bridge to Eternity
6. Ordeal by Fire
7. Murder Train
8. Window of Peril
9. Trail to Destruction
10. High Voltage Danger (clip show)
11. Death's Highway
12. The Phantom Meets Justice

== See also ==
- 1950 in film
- List of science fiction films of the 1950s
