= Ghost of Zorro =

1949 film by Fred C. Brannon

- Directed by: Fred C. Brannon
- Written by: Royal K Cole; William Lively; Sol Shor
- Produced by: Franklin Adreon
- Starring: Clayton Moore; Pamela Blake; Roy Barcroft; George J. Lewis; Eugene Roth
- Cinematography: John MacBurnie
- Music by: Stanley Wilson
- Distributed by: Republic Pictures
- Release dates: March 24, 1949 (U.S. serial); June 30, 1959 (U.S. feature)
- Running time: 12 chapters / 167 minutes (serial); 69 minutes (feature)
- Country: United States
- Language: English
- Budget: $165,086 (negative cost: $164,895)

Ghost of Zorro is a 1949 Republic Movie serial. It uses substantial stock footage from earlier serials, including Son of Zorro and Daredevils of the West. This film was shot in Chatsworth, Los Angeles.

== Plot ==
The year is 1865 and the telegraph is heading west. George Crane, wanting to keep law and order out of his territory, is out to stop the construction. One of the main engineers on the job is Ken Mason, the grandson of the original Zorro. As Crane hires his men to stop the work, Mason finds himself in the legendary role his ancestor originated.

== Cast ==
- Clayton Moore as Ken Mason/Zorro
- Pamela Blake as Rita White
- Roy Barcroft as Hank Kilgore
- George J. Lewis as Moccasin
- Eugene Roth as George Crane
- I. Stanford Jolley
- Steve Clark
- Tom Steele
- Dale Van Sickel
- John Crawford

== Production ==
Ghost of Zorro was budgeted at $165,086 although the final negative cost was $164,895 (a $191, or 0.1 percent, under-spend).

It was filmed between January 11 and February 2, 1949. The serial's production number was 1702.

=== Stunts ===
- Tom Steele as Ken Mason/Zorro (doubling Clayton Moore)

=== Special Effects ===
Special effects by the Lydecker brothers.

== Release ==
=== Theatrical ===
Ghost of Zorro's official release date is March 24, 1949, although this is actually the date the sixth chapter was made available to film exchanges.

A 69-minute feature film version, created by editing the serial footage together, was released on June 30, 1959. It was one of fourteen feature films Republic made from their serials.

== Chapter titles ==
166 minutes = 2h, 45m, 12s

1. Bandit Territory (19min 56s)
2. Forged Orders (13min 13s)
3. Robber's Agent (13min 09s)
4. Victims of Vengeance (13min 07s)
5. Gun Trap (13min 11s)
6. Deadline at Midnight (13min 18s)
7. Tower of Disaster (13min 14s)
8. Mob Justice (13min 18s)
9. Money Lure (13min 15s)
10. Message of Death (12min 39s) - a re-cap chapter
11. Runaway Stagecoach (13min 48s)
12. Trail of Blood (12min 59s)

_{Source:}

== See also ==
- List of film serials by year
- List of film serials by studio
- Earlier Republic Zorro serials:-
  - Zorro Rides Again (1937)
  - Zorro's Fighting Legion (1939)
  - Zorro's Black Whip (1944)
  - Son of Zorro (1947)

Preceded by Federal Agents vs. Underworld, Inc (1948)	Republic Serial; Ghost of Zorro (1949)	Succeeded by King of the Rocket Men (1949)
Preceded by Son of Zorro (1947)	Zorro Serial; Ghost of Zorro (1949)	Succeeded by none
