= Fred C. Brannon =

American film director

- Born: April 26, 1901; Louisiana, United States
- Died: April 6, 1953 (aged 51); Los Angeles
- Years active: 1945 - 1953
- Spouse: Dorothy

Fred Curtis Brannon (April 26, 1901 – April 6, 1953) was an American film director of the 1940s and 1950s. He is known among film buffs as a staff director at Republic Pictures, where he directed or co-directed serials and westerns from 1945 until his death.

His first film, The Purple Monster Strikes (1945), was a collaboration with veteran serial director Spencer Gordon Bennet. Bennet and Brannon (then billed as Fred Brannon) remained a team until 1947, when Bennet left the studio for Sam Katzman's serial unit at Columbia Pictures. Brannon then became Republic's principal serial director (now billed as Fred C. Brannon) and continued to direct serials and western features for the studio for the next six years.

== Death ==
Brannon died on April 6, 1953 at Cedars of Lebanon Hospital in Los Angeles, a few weeks short of his 52nd birthday. He was interred at Forest Lawn Memorial Park.

== Filmography ==
- 1945: The Purple Monster Strikes
- 1946: The Phantom Rider (as Fred Brannon)
- 1946: King of the Forest Rangers (as Fred Bannon)
- 1946: Daughter of Don Q
- 1946: The Crimson Ghost
- 1947: Son of Zorro
- 1947: Jesse James Rides Again
- 1947: The Black Widow
- 1948: G-Men Never Forget
- 1948: Dangers of the Canadian Mounted (as Fred Bannon)
- 1948: Adventures of Frank and Jesse James (as Fred Brannon)
- 1949: Federal Agents vs. Underworld, Inc.
- 1949: Ghost of Zorro
- 1949: Frontier Investigator
- 1949: King of the Rocket Men
- 1949: Bandit King of Texas
- 1949: The James Brothers of Missouri
- 1949: Radar Patrol vs. Spy King
- 1950: Gunmen of Abilene
- 1950: Code of the Silver Sage
- 1950: Salt Lake Raiders
- 1950: The Invisible Monster
- 1950: Desperadoes of the West
- 1950: Vigilante Hideout
- 1950: Rustlers on Horseback
- 1950: Flying Disc Man from Mars
- 1951: Arizona Manhunt
- 1951: Lost Planet Airmen
- 1951: Government Agents vs Phantom Legion
- 1951: Don Daredevil Rides Again
- 1951: Night Riders of Montana
- 1951: Rough Riders of Durango
- 1952: Radar Men from the Moon
- 1952: Captive of Billy the Kid
- 1952: Wild Horse Ambush
- 1952: Zombies of the Stratosphere
- 1953: Jungle Drums of Africa
- 1955: Commando Cody: Sky Marshal of the Universe

The following feature films, credited to Fred Brannon, were compiled from his serials and released to theaters or television:

- 1951: Lost Planet Airmen (theatrical feature condensed from King of the Rocket Men)
- 1958: Missile Monsters (theatrical feature condensed from Flying Disc Man from Mars)
- 1958: Satan's Satellites (theatrical feature condensed from Zombies of the Stratosphere)
- 1959: Ghost of Zorro (theatrical feature condensed from the serial of the same name)
- 1966: Cyclotrode "X" (television feature condensed from The Crimson Ghost)
- 1966: R.C.M.P. and the Treasure of Genghis Khan (television feature condensed from Dangers of the Canadian Mounted)
- 1966: D-Day on Mars (television feature condensed from The Purple Monster Strikes)
- 1966: Retik, the Moon Menace (television feature condensed from Radar Men from the Moon)
- 1966: U-238 and the Witch Doctor (television feature condensed from Jungle Drums of Africa)
- 1966: Slaves of the Invisible Monster (television feature condensed from The Invisible Monster)
- 1966: Code 645 (television feature condensed from G-Men Never Forget)
