= King of the Royal Mounted =

American comic series

- Author: Stephen Slesinger; Romer Grey, Gaylord Du Bois
- Illustrator(s): Allen Dean, Charles Flanders, Jim Gary
- Current status/schedule: Concluded daily & Sunday strip
- Launch date: February 17, 1935 (Sundays), March 2, 1936 (dailies)
- End date: February 14, 1954
- Syndicate(s): King Features Syndicate
- Publisher(s): Big Little Books, Dell Comics
- Genre(s): Western, Northern

King of the Royal Mounted is an American comics series which debuted February 17, 1935 by Stephen Slesinger, based on popular Western writer Zane Grey's byline and marketed as Zane Grey's King of the Royal Mounted. The series' protagonist is Dave King, a Canadian Mountie who always gets his man and who, over the course of the series, is promoted from Corporal to Sergeant. King has appeared in newspaper strips, comics, Big Little Books, and other ancillary items.

Zane Grey's son Romer and Slesinger collaborated on many of the stories, and the artwork was produced by Allen Dean, Charles Flanders, and Jim Gary in Slesinger's New York studio. A movie serial was produced in 1942.

== Newspaper strip ==
King of the Royal Mounted started as a Sunday comic strip from King Features Syndicate on Sunday, February 17, 1935. The strip was initially drawn by the comics artist Allen Dean.

Allen Dean previously collaborated with Zane Grey on the original King of the Royal Mounted in 1935 but quit when Romer Grey/Slesinger later took over production, as told to son Allen M. Dean Jr, who was born in 1942.

A daily version was added on March 2, 1936, at which point the Sunday strip was passed on to Charles Flanders, who took over the daily strip as well in April 1938. From 1939, Gaylord DuBois became the writer and Jim Gary became the artist, creating King until it ended on February 14, 1954 In the end, it was Jim Gary who became the artist most closely associated with the strip.

== Film ==
- King of the Royal Mounted, 20th Century Fox, September 11, 1936, starred Robert Kent. The feature was retitled Romance of the Royal Mounted when it was released on video.
- King of the Royal Mounted, Republic, September 20, 1940, 12-part serial, starred Allan "Rocky" Lane
- The Yukon Patrol, Republic, April 30, 1942, feature film version of the 1940 serial King of the Royal Mounted
- King of the Mounties, Republic, Oct. 17, 1942, 12-part serial, also starring Allan "Rocky" Lane

== Big Little Books ==
- King of the Royal Mounted, 1936, Big Little Book GW138-1103
- King of the Royal Mounted and the Northern Treasure, 1937, Big Little Book GW180-1179
- King of the Royal Mounted Gets His Man, 1938, Big Little Book GW230-1452
- King of the Royal Mounted and the Great Jewel Mystery, 1939, Better Little Book SW32-1486
- King of the Royal Mounted and the Long Arm of the Law, 1942, Better Little Book SW119-1405

== Comic books ==
- Feature Book #1 (David McKay Publications, May 1937)
- King Comics (David McKay Publications) — series published 1936–1949
- Famous Feature Stories (Dell Comics, 1938)
- Red Ryder (Dell, 1940) — newspaper comic strip reprints
- Four Color Comics #207, 265, 283, 310, 340, 363, 384 (Dell, 1948–1952) — newspaper comic strip reprints, with Jim Gary cover art
  - King of the Royal Mounted #8–28 (Dell, June 1952–March 1958) — Written by Gaylord Du Bois with art in the Jim Gary style. The series started with issue #8 because the issues published under the Four Color Comics banner were considered the first seven issues.
  - Four Color Comics #935 (Dell, April 1958) — final comic book issue

== See also ==
- Sergeant Preston of the Yukon
- Renfrew of the Royal Mounted
- Northern (genre)
