= Zorro's Fighting Legion =

1939 film by John English, William Witney

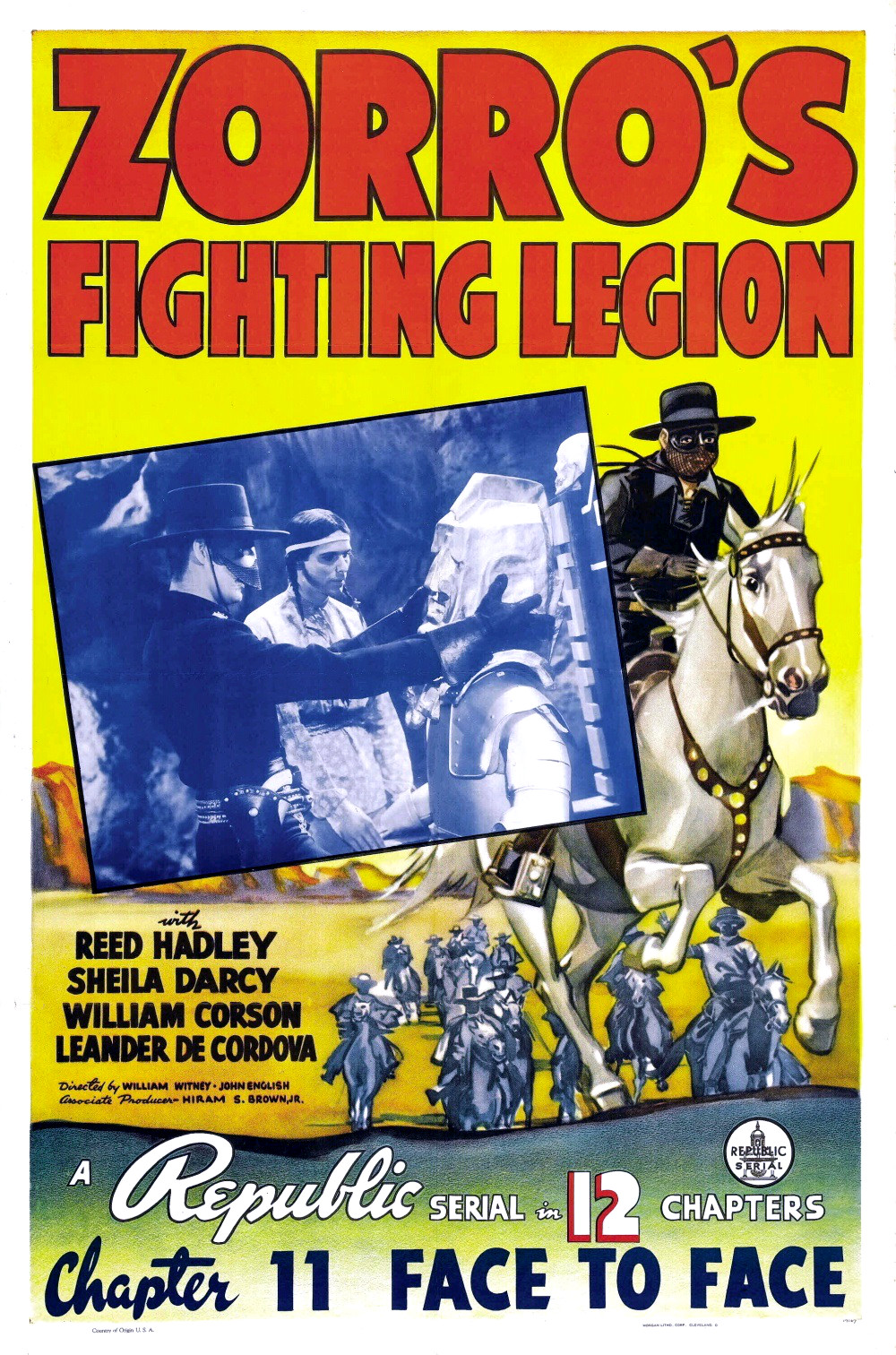
- Directed by: William Witney; John English
- Written by: Ronald Davidson; Franklin Adreon; Morgan Cox; Sol Shor; Barney A. Sarecky; Johnston McCulley (Original Zorro Novel)
- Produced by: Hiram S. Brown Jr
- Starring: Reed Hadley; Sheila Darcy; William Corson; Leander De Cordova; Edmund Cobb; John Merton; C. Montague Shaw
- Cinematography: Reggie Lanning
- Distributed by: Republic Pictures
- Release date: December 16, 1939
- Running time: 12 chapters (211 minutes) (serial); 6 26½-minute episodes (TV)
- Language: English
- Budget: $137,826 (negative cost: $144,419)

Zorro's Fighting Legion, Chapter 1: Golden God.

Zorro's Fighting Legion is a 1939 Republic Pictures film serial consisting of twelve chapters starring Reed Hadley as Zorro and directed by William Witney and John English. The plot revolves around his alter-ego Don Diego's fight against the evil Don Del Oro.

The serial is unusual in featuring a real historical personage, Mexican President Benito Juárez, as a minor character. It is the second in a series of five Zorro serials: Zorro Rides Again (1937), Zorro's Black Whip (1944), Son of Zorro (1947) and Ghost of Zorro (1949).

== Plot ==
The mysterious Don Del Oro ("Lord of Gold"), an idol of the Yaqui, emerges and attacks the gold trade of the Republic of Mexico, intent on becoming Emperor. A man named Francisco is put in charge of a fighting legion to combat the Yaqui tribe and protect the gold; he is attacked by men working for Don Del Oro. Francisco's partner recognizes Zorro as the hidalgo Don Diego Vega. Francisco asks Diego, as Zorro, to take over the fighting legion and defeat Don Del Oro.

== Cast ==
- Reed Hadley as Don Diego Vega/Zorro

Though there were numerous Zorro serials, Hadley was the only actor to play the original Zorro in any of them.

- Sheila Darcy as Volita
- William Corson as Ramón
- Leander De Cordova as Governor Felipe
- Edmund Cobb as Manuel González
- John Merton as Comandante Manuel
- C. Montague Shaw as Chief Justice Pablo/Don Del Oro
- Budd Buster as Juan
- Carleton Young as Benito Juárez
- Bud Geary as Don Del Oro (body and voice)

== Production ==
Zorro's Fighting Legion was budgeted at $137,826, although the final negative cost was $144,419 (a $6,593, or 4.8%, overspend). It was filmed between 15 September and 14 October 1939 under the working title Return of Zorro. The serial's production number was 898.

This film was shot in Simi Hills and Chatsworth, Los Angeles.

=== Stunts ===
- Dale Van Sickel doubling Reed Hadley
- Yakima Canutt
- James Fawcett
- Ted Mapes
- Ken Terrell

== Release ==
=== Theatrical ===
Zorro's Fighting Legion's official release date is 16 December 1939, although this is actually the date the sixth chapter was made available to film exchanges. The serial was re-released on 24 March 1958, making it the last serial released by Republic, which re-released serials for several years following the release of their final serial King of the Carnival in 1955.

=== Television ===
In the early 1950s, Zorro's Fighting Legion was one of fourteen Republic serials edited into a television series. It was broadcast in six 26½-minute episodes.

== Chapter titles ==
209 minutes = 3h, 28m, 58s

1. The Golden God (27 min 21s)
2. The Flaming "Z" (16 min 37s)
3. Descending Doom (16 min 40s)
4. The Bridge of Peril (16 min 42s)
5. The Decoy (16 min 38s)
6. Zorro to the Rescue (16 min 37s)
7. The Fugitive (16 min 23s)
8. Flowing Death (16 min 23s)
9. The Golden Arrow (16 min 36s) – Re-Cap Chapter
10. Mystery Wagon (16 min 37s)
11. Face to Face (16 min 20s)
12. Unmasked (16 min 34s)

_{Source:}

== Differences from the Zorro canon ==
The story takes a few liberties with Zorro's official timeline: it takes place in Mexico instead of Alta California; Zorro wears a masquerade mask, rather than the traditional bandana; the characters Don Alejandro Vega (Don Diego's father) and Bernardo are absent; and Zorro's horse, Tornado, was changed to white (much like Kaiketsu Zorro). However, this story is presented as a further adventure of Zorro, a sequel to the traditional "Mark of Zorro" origin story originally starring Douglas Fairbanks and Noah Beery Sr., which would be remade the year after Zorro's Fighting Legion with Tyrone Power and Basil Rathbone: Don Diego is said to be visiting from Los Angeles, and the serial intentionally did not remake the Zorro story; instead, it shows Zorro visiting Mexico because his help is needed there. The people of Mexico immediately recognize Zorro when he first appears, strongly suggesting that Zorro is a well-known hero.

The date given for the movie is 1824, which in and of itself establishes that it takes place well after Zorro's California adventures: Zorro opposed a corrupt Spanish Colonial government in his canon tales, and California ceased being a Spanish Colony in 1821.
