= Jesse Duffy =

American screenwriter

Jesse Ardene Duffy (March 24, 1894 – December 14, 1952), sometimes billed as J. A. Duffy, was an American serial screenwriter for Republic Pictures and Columbia Pictures during the 1940s. He also directed some of the "Mickey McGuire" series starring Mickey Rooney released by Post Pictures Corporation, and later distributed by Columbia.

Duffy, born to Clarence and Lizzy Goode Duffy, spent his early years in Owensboro, Kentucky, and the surrounding Daviess County area before moving westward to California. As a screenwriter, he primarily wrote Western films. Duffy died on December 14, 1952, at the Westover Sanitorium in Los Angeles after a bout of illness.
