= Franklin Adreon =

American actor (1902–1979)

- Born: November 18, 1902; Gambrills, Maryland, U.S.
- Died: September 10, 1979 (aged 76); Thousand Oaks, California, U.S.
- Other names: Franklyn Adreon; Lt. Franklyn Adreon
- Occupations: Screenwriter, director, producer, actor
- Years active: 1935–1966

Franklin "Pete" Adreon (born Franklyn Adreon, November 18, 1902 – September 10, 1979) was an American film and television director, producer, screenwriter, and actor. He is best known to film buffs as the longtime producer of Republic Pictures' serials.

== Early life and career ==
Born in Gambrills, Maryland, Franklyn Adreon (pronounced "AD-re-on") began his career as a bond salesman before enlisting in the United States Marine Corps in 1931. After his four-year enlistment he remained on call as a Marine Reservist during the 1930s, and served in the United States Marine Corps in World War II. Stationed initially with the 6th Marines in Iceland, Major Adreon was put in charge of the Marine Corps' photographic unit at Quantico, and produced military training films.

Adreon entered motion pictures in 1935 with Mascot Pictures as a technical advisor on the serial The Fighting Marines (in which he also appeared in the role of Captain Holmes). This led to a post as an assistant director, which he held while the studio was absorbed by Republic Pictures in 1936. In 1937 Adreon became a screenwriter, collaborating on the scripts of Republic's serials. He worked with serial director William Witney, who also served in the Marines during the war.

Adreon soon became the head of Republic's serial unit, and produced many hit serials, with his first name now billed as "Franklin". After the unit's resident director Fred C. Brannon died in April 1953, Adreon took over Brannon's duties himself and both produced and directed the serials until the studio ceased serial production in 1955.

He stayed with Republic as a director, producer, and writer on various television series and films. When the studio halted production in 1957, Adreon moved to Warner Bros. as a director, and worked on its popular TV series, including Maverick and Sugarfoot. Adreon kept busy with western and action assignments until 1966, when he retired at age 63.

Franklin Adreon died on September 10, 1979, in Thousand Oaks, California, at the age of 76.

== Selected filmography ==
Film
Year	Film	Notes
1937	S.O.S. Coast Guard	Original screenplay
1938	The Fighting Devil Dogs	Original screenplay
1939	Zorro's Fighting Legion	Original screenplay
1940	Adventures of Red Ryder	Original screenplay Credited as Franklyn Adreon
1947	Jesse James Rides Again	Original screenplay
1948	Adventures of Frank and Jesse James	Associate producer
1949	Ghost of Zorro	Associate producer
1950	The Invisible Monster	Associate producer
1951	Government Agents vs Phantom Legion	Associate producer
1952	Zombies of the Stratosphere	Associate producer
1953	Canadian Mounties vs. Atomic Invaders	Director, associate producer
1954	Trader Tom of the China Seas	Director, associate producer
1955	King of the Carnival	Director, associate producer
1956	The Man is Armed	Director
1962	The Nun and the Sergeant	Director
1966	Dimension 5	Director
1966	Cyborg 2087	Director; Alternative title: Man from Tomorrow
Television
Year	Title	Notes
1955	Commando Cody: Sky Marshal of the Universe	Associate producer, 12 episodes
1957	Cheyenne	Director, 2 episodes
1957–1958	Maverick	Director, 2 episodes
1957–1958	Colt .45	Director, 4 episodes
1957–1958	Sugarfoot	Director, 10 episodes
1958	Frontier Doctor	Director, 2 episodes
1958–1959	26 Men	Director, 2 episodes
1958–1959	Lassie	Director, 14 episodes
1958–1959	The Rough Riders	Director, 5 episodes
1959–1960	Tombstone Territory	Director, 5 episodes
1960	Pony Express	Director, 1 episode
1960	Men into Space	Director, 1 episode
1960	Lock-Up	Director, 3 episodes
1960	Shotgun Slade	Director, 2 episodes
1960	Gunsmoke	Director, 1 episode
1960–1961	Bat Masterson	Director, 5 episodes
1961	Ripcord	Director, 1 episode
1961	The Tall Man	Director, 1 episode
