= Sol Shor =

American screenwriter

Sol Shor (July 17, 1913 – May 1985) was an American film and television screenwriter, credited mostly with B-westerns and movie serials.

== Early life, education and career ==
Shor was born in the Bronx and graduated from the City College of New York. After working as general manager of the Novelty Manufacturing Company and as a freelancer, Shor was signed as a writer to Republic Pictures in 1937.

Sol Shor admitted to having been an American Communist Party member before the House Un-American Activities Committee and named other party members in his testimony.

== Death ==
Shor died in May 1985 in New Rochelle, New York.

== Filmography ==
- The Lone Ranger Rides Again (1939)
- Dick Tracy's G-Men (1939)
- Drums of Fu Manchu (1940)
- Adventures of Captain Marvel (1941)
- The Yukon Patrol (1942)
- The Crimson Ghost (serial, 1946)
- Daughter of the Jungle (1949)
- Federal Agents vs. Underworld, Inc. (1949)
- Ghost of Zorro (serial, 1949)
- King of the Rocket Men (serial, 1949)
- Flame of Calcutta (1953)
- Savage Mutiny (1953)
