= Negative cost =

Expenses of film production

Negative cost is the net expense to produce and shoot a film, excluding such expenditures as distribution and promotion.

Low-budget movies, for example The Blair Witch Project, can have promotional expenses that are much larger than the negative cost.

The term comes from the costs up to the production of the final negative.
