= Carey Loftin =

American motorcycle stunt performer

- Born: William Carey Loftin; January 31, 1914; Blountstown, Florida, U.S.
- Died: March 4, 1997 (aged 83); Huntington Beach, California, U.S.
- Resting place: Forest Lawn Memorial Park (Hollywood Hills)
- Other names: Cary Loftin; Carry Loftin; Carey Lofton; Gary Loftin; William Carey Loftin
- Occupations: Stuntman; stunt coordinator; actor
- Years active: 1937–1997

William Carey Loftin (January 31, 1914 – March 4, 1997, a.k.a. Cary Loftin, Carry Loftin, Carey Lofton, Gary Loftin) was an American professional stuntman, stunt coordinator and actor in the U.S. film industry. He is considered to be one of the film industry's most accomplished stunt drivers. In a lengthy career spanning 61 years, his body of work included classic films such as Thunder Road, Bullitt, Vanishing Point, Duel, and The French Connection. He was posthumously inducted into the AMA Motorcycle Hall of Fame in 2001.

== Early life ==
Loftin was born in Blountstown, Florida, and grew up in Alabama and Mississippi where he learned to ride a motorcycle when he was 10 years old. He attended high school in Hattiesburg, Mississippi, and began his stunt career at the age of 19 as a member of a traveling motorcycle stunt show in the early 1930s. Having to constantly repair and maintain motorcycles made him a proficient mechanic. After serving in the United States Marine Corps, Loftin moved to Los Angeles, California, in the late 1930s where he worked as a mechanic.

== Film industry career ==
Loftin began his career as a stuntman in the 1930s, working in serials such as Dick Tracy Returns and The Green Hornet. During the 1940s and 1950s, Loftin raced in many Southern California off-road motorcycle events such as the Catalina Grand Prix, the Big Bear Hare & Hound desert race, the Greenhorn Enduro and others. Loftin was soon being hired by film studios for his talent as a motorcycle stunt rider but, also became invaluable for his mechanical expertise on film sets. Although Loftin performed many different types of stunt work, it is his driving abilities for which he is most remembered. His stunt driving in the 1958 film Thunder Road was considered groundbreaking for its realism. He had an uncredited stunt driver role in the seminal 1966 auto racing film Grand Prix.

Loftin served as the uncredited stunt coordinator for the 1968 film Bullitt, which included one of the most influential car chase scenes in film history. He was also one of the stuntmen driving the green Ford Mustang during the chase scene filmed on the streets of San Francisco. While working on Bullitt, one of his fellow stuntmen called him "the greatest car man in the business". Loftin was also involved in the filming of the car chase scene in the 1971 film The French Connection, which is also considered one of the most impressive car chases in film history. Loftin mentioned that the hardest stunt to do during his whole career was during the final scene in White Line Fever (1975) driving the main character truck, for which he was the only hired stuntman. Followed by second hardest stunt in his whole entire career he had mentioned was with the truck in the final scene of Duel (1971). These two roles later got him more iconic stuntman roles for the main characters trucks in Road Movie (1972), Hijack! (1974), Movin' On (1974-1976), Truck Stop Women (1974), La Menace (1975), Trucker's Woman (1976), The Great Smokey Roadblock (1977), Smokey and the Bandit (1977), High Ballin' (1978), Steel Cowboy (1978), Steel (1979), B. J. and the Bear (1979-1981), Willa (1979), Smokey and the Bandit II (1980), Time Bomb (1984), Thunder Run (1986), Armed and Dangerous (1986), Near Dark (1987), Over The Top (1987), The Wizard (1989), License To Kill (1989), Jacknife (1989), The Chase (1990), Pink Lightning (1991), Stop! Or My Mom Will Shoot (1992), Revenge on the Highway (1992), Heat (1996), Hit & Run (1996), Fire Down Below (1997), Country Justice (1997), Breakdown (1997) and in Black Dog (1998)

Aside from being a busy stuntman, Loftin also acted in bit parts of the many films and television shows in which he performed stunts. One of his most famous, yet discreet roles was as the murderous truck driver in Steven Spielberg's Duel (billed as Cary Loftin), in which only his arm and boots can be seen. He also acted as a truck driver in Stroker Ace (1983) in which his face is never seen as in Duel, but not as a villain this time.

Loftin did, however, act as a kind of villainous car driver in Christine (1983) and similarly, as a faceless truck driver in Maximum Overdrive (1986), both in which films the machinery comes to life as evil. He did some acting, stunt work, and driving scenes in Christine, along with Terry Leonard. He also did much of the stunt work and driving scenes in Maximum Overdrive, being the sole driver of the red trash truck marked "Zeke's Trash Removal" and one of two stunt drivers, along with Tommy J. Huff, of the lead character Green Goblin truck. Loftin acted as a murderous faceless truck driver in Messenger of Death (1988) again with Tommy J. Huff and Gene Hartline, and had a supporting role as Skinner in the Keenan Wynn and Bob Mathias series The Troubleshooters, which aired on NBC in the 1959–1960 season.

A notable demonstration of stunt driving that Loftin performed was the car chase/race in Against All Odds (1984). He was the driver of the black 1982 Ferrari 308 GTS. According to the movie's director, Taylor Hackford, Loftin was 68 when he did this stunt. At first Hackford was reluctant to hire the aging stuntman, but stunt coordinator Gary Davis convinced Hackford that, even at his age, Loftin was by far the best car man in the business at that time.

Loftin has also previously mentioned that the hardest vehicle to drive during his whole career was a 1974 Autocar A64B seen in Maximum Overdrive (1986). Loftin mentions that it was due to very little visibility that made the vehicle very hard to maneuver.

== Later life ==
Loftin eventually semi-retired in 1991 at age 77 after doing Pink Lightning (1991), although he still took minor stunt roles as a truck driver. He did stunt driving for the main characters' trucks in B.J. and the Bear (1978–81) and Movin' On (1974-76). His last major role was in Black Dog (1998), stunt driving for the main characters' truck. Loftin died after the movie was filmed and before the movie premiered.

Loftin died of natural causes on March 4, 1997, in Huntington Beach, California, aged 83. He is a member of the Stuntmen's Hall of Fame, and the Motorcycle Hall of Fame.

== Selected filmography ==
- Public Cowboy No. 1 (1937) - Motorcycle Rider (uncredited)
- Radio Patrol (1937, Serial) - Pollard Henchman (uncredited)
- Burn 'Em Up O'Connor (1939) - Starter (uncredited)
- Dick Tracy's G-Men (1939, Serial) - Trooper on Foot (uncredited)
- Nick Carter, Master Detective (1939) - Minor Role (uncredited)
- Rocky Mountain Rangers (1940) - Ranger-Guard (uncredited)
- Grand Ole Opry (1940) - Hillbilly (uncredited)
- The Bank Dick (1940) - Townsman (uncredited)
- Flying Wild (1941) - Henchman (uncredited)
- Down Mexico Way (1941) - Motorcycle Cop (uncredited)
- Spy Smasher (1942, Serial) - Launch Heavy [Ch. 8] (uncredited)
- Perils of Nyoka (1942, Serial) - Tuareg (uncredited)
- Shantytown (1943) - Gangster (uncredited)
- Secret Service in Darkest Africa (1943, Serial) - Workman [Ch. 6] / Arab 1 [Ch. 7] (uncredited)
- The Masked Marvel (1943, Serial) - Harbor Café Thug #2 (uncredited)
- The Tiger Woman (1944, Serial) - Slim (uncredited)
- In Society (1944) - Mugg (uncredited)
- Haunted Harbor (1944, Serial) - Cave Thug #2 [Ch. 7] (uncredited)
- Lost in a Harem (1944) - Chase Guard (uncredited)
- Zorro's Black Whip (1944, Serial) - Dirk (uncredited)
- I'll Remember April (1945) - Roughneck (uncredited)
- Trail to Vengeance (1945) - Gunman (uncredited)
- Secret Agent X-9 (1945, Serial) - 'Swanson' Sailor / Charlie (uncredited)
- The Purple Monster Strikes (1945, Serial) - Mack (uncredited)
- King of the Forest Rangers (1946, Serial) - Forbes - Trading Post Henchman [Ch. 1] (uncredited)
- The Crimson Ghost (1946, Serial) - Lab Guard #1 [Ch. 9] (uncredited)
- The Michigan Kid (1947) - Brawler (uncredited)
- Jesse James Rides Again (1947, Serial) - Henchman at Nelson's (uncredited)
- Louisiana (1947) - Motorcycle Policeman
- The Black Widow (1947, Serial) - Spike (uncredited)
- G-Men Never Forget (1948, Serial) - Hodge - Cook's Killer [Ch. 5] (uncredited)
- Here Comes Trouble (1948) - Hood at Burlesque House (uncredited)
- Dangers of the Canadian Mounted (1948, Serial) - Baggage Car Clerk / Porter (uncredited)
- Raw Deal (1948) - Motorcycle Cop (uncredited)
- Adventures of Frank and Jesse James (1948, Serial) - Pete - Henchman [Chs. 3-4] / Henchman [Ch. 11] (uncredited)
- Federal Agents vs. Underworld, Inc. (1949, Serial) - Ambulance Thug [Ch. 3] (uncredited)
- King of the Rocket Men (1949, Serial) - Sparks - Henchman [Ch. 2] (uncredited)
- Mighty Joe Young (1949) - Deputy (uncredited)
- Radar Patrol vs. Spy King (1949, Serial) - Cave Heavy [Ch. 9-10] (uncredited)
- The Threat (1949) - Motorcycle Cop (uncredited)
- The Invisible Monster (1950, Serial) - Dirk - Dynamite Thug [Ch.6] (uncredited)
- Armored Car Robbery (1950) - Duff (uncredited)
- The Flame and the Arrow (1950) - Outlaw (uncredited)
- The Milkman (1950) - Milkman (uncredited)
- Flying Disc Man from Mars (1950, Serial) - Truck loader-thug [Chs. 7-8] (uncredited)
- Soldiers Three (1951) - Brawler (uncredited)
- Don Daredevil Rides Again (1951, Serial) - Owens (uncredited)
- Radar Men from the Moon (1952, Serial) - Motorist transporting pursuit cop [Ch. 8] (uncredited)
- Fearless Fagan (1952) - Truck Driver (uncredited)
- Army Bound (1952) - Duke Horner
- Jalopy (1953) - Jalopy driver (uncredited)
- Code Two (1953) - Policeman (uncredited)
- Canadian Mounties vs. Atomic Invaders (1953, Serial) - Launch heavy # [Ch.6] (uncredited)
- Captain Scarface (1953) - Radio Man, S.S. Banos (uncredited)
- The Wild One (1953) - Gang Member (uncredited)
- Gypsy Colt (1954) - Bill (uncredited)
- A Star Is Born (1954) - Signboard man #2 (uncredited)
- Six Bridges to Cross (1955) - Policeman (uncredited)
- The Steel Jungle (1956) - Truck Driver
- Don't Go Near the Water (1957) - Navy officer on roof (uncredited)
- The Perfect Furlough (1958) - French cart peddler (uncredited)
- Johnny Rocco (1958) - Motorcycle Cop
- The Rebel Set (1959)
- The Shaggy Dog (1959) - Stunt driver (uncredited)
- The Big Operator (1959) - Chris Baker (uncredited)
- The Rise and Fall of Legs Diamond (1960) - Thug (uncredited)
- Thunder in Carolina (1960) - Tommy Webb
- Spartacus (1960) - Guard (uncredited)
- It's a Mad, Mad, Mad, Mad World (1963) - Stunt Supervisor, stunt driver (uncredited), stunt double (uncredited)
- The Satan Bug (1965) - First agent at truck crash (uncredited)
- The Great Race (1965) - Saloon brawler (uncredited)
- Dr. Goldfoot and the Bikini Machine (1965)
- The Love Bug (1968) - Driver (uncredited)
- The Wrecking Crew (1968) - Driver (uncredited)
- Patton (1970) - Gen. Bradley's driver
- Duel (1971) - Truck driver
- Walking Tall (1973) - Dice player
- The Taking of Pelham One Two Three (1974) - Motorcycle cop (uncredited)
- Night Moves (1975) - Cop (uncredited)
- Walking Tall Part 2 (1975) - Truck driver (uncredited)
- Herbie Goes to Monte Carlo (1977) - Driver
- The Promise (1979) - Truck driver
- Stroker Ace (1983) - Truck Driver (uncredited)
- Christine (1983) - Truck driver (uncredited)
- City Heat (1984) - Roxy driver
- Messenger of Death (1988) - Truck driver (uncredited)
