= Canadian Mounties vs. Atomic Invaders =

1953 film by Franklin Adreon

- Original poster
- Directed by: Franklin Adreon
- Written by: Ronald Davidson
- Produced by: Franklin Adreon
- Starring: William Henry; Susan Morrow; Arthur Space; Dale Van Sickel; Pierre Watkin
- Cinematography: John MacBurnie
- Music by: Stanley Wilson
- Distributed by: Republic Pictures
- Release dates: July 8, 1953 (U.S. serial); 1966 (U.S. TV)
- Running time: 12 chapters / 167 minutes (serial); 100 minutes (TV)
- Country: United States
- Language: English
- Budget: $172,795 (negative cost: $167,669)

Canadian Mounties vs. Atomic Invaders (1953) is a Republic Movie serial starring Bill Henry and both produced and directed by Franklin Adreon. It was the sixty-second serial (of sixty-six) produced by Republic. Despite the title, this is not a science fiction serial. The plot is a northern Cold War adventure involving secret missile bases and a planned invasion of the United States.

== Plot ==
A foreign power, which is represented by their agent Marlof, attempts to set up secret missile bases in Canada to target the United States for their planned summer invasion. Meanwhile, acting on intelligence following the smashing of a spy ring in Montreal, Royal Canadian Mounted Police (RCMP) officers Don Roberts and Kay Conway go undercover in a settling party headed for the Yukon. Marlof also has agents, Beck and Reed, in the party en route to the site of the planned missile bases. Their attempts to disrupt the party only call the attention of the Mounties to the larger plot who, once the settlers finally reach their goal, continue to pursue the troublemakers, uncover their plot against the free world, unmask Marlof and bring them to justice.

== Cast ==
- Bill Henry as Don Roberts, Sergeant in the RCMP
- Susan Morrow as Kay Conway, undercover operative of the RCMP
- Arthur Space as Marlof, agent of a foreign power masquerading as Smoky Joe, a senile trapper
- Dale Van Sickel as Beck, one of Marlof's two key henchmen.
- Pierre Watkin as Morrison, Commissioner of the RCMP
- Mike Ragan as Reed, the other of Marlof's two key henchmen.
- Stanley Andrews as Anderson, lead headed for the Yukon
- Edmund Cobb as Warner, a settler headed for the Yukon
- Jean Wright as Betty Warner, a settler headed for the Yukon
- Fred Graham as Mason, a henchman embedded with the settlers to keep them from reaching the Yukon
- Hank Patterson as Jed Larson, a wizened Yukon trapper
- Gayle Kellogg as Guy Sanders, a Corporal in the RCMP
- Harry Lauter as Clark, a Mountie
- Tom Steele as Mac, Marlof's truck driving henchman

== Production ==
Canadian Mounties vs. Atomic Invaders was budgeted at $172,795 although the final negative cost was $167,669 (a $5,126, or 3%, under spend). It was the cheapest Republic serial of 1953 and the most under budget of all Republic serials.

The next most under budget was the preceding Jungle Drums of Africa at $5,082 (2.9%) under budget. Those were the only two Republic serials released in 1953, although the studio did re-release Adventures of Captain Marvel (as Return of Captain Marvel) and Captain America (as Return of Captain America) to pad out their release schedule, not to mention the serial Commando Cody: Sky Marshal of the Universe, which was originally intended to be a television series.

Though filmed entirely in the United States, early chapters in Canadian Mounties vs. Atomic Invaders are set in a snowy region of northern Canada referred to as Taniak and rely heavily on the use of footage from earlier Republic productions including the 1938 feature Call of the Yukon and serials King of the Royal Mounted and King of the Mounties. These are blended with rear projection scenes featuring the serial's cast on studio sets and a "snow-dressed" Republic backlot. Later chapters set in snow-free forest were largely filmed in the Big Bear Lake region of California's San Bernardino National Forest.

It was filmed between 24 March and 13 April 1953. The serial's production number was 1936.

=== Stunts ===
- George DeNormand
- Fred Graham
- Carey Loftin
- Dale Van Sickel
- Joe Yrigoyen

=== Special effects ===
Special Effects by the Lydecker brothers

== Release ==
=== Theatrical ===
Canadian Mounties vs. Atomic Invaders official release date is 8 July 1953, although this is actually the date the sixth chapter was made available to film exchanges.

This was followed by a re-release of Captain America, re-titled as Return of Captain America, instead of a new serial. The next new serial, Trader Tom of the China Seas, followed in 1954.

=== Television ===
Canadian Mounties vs. Atomic Invaders was one of twenty-six Republic serials re-released as a 100-minute "Century 66" feature film on television in 1966, titled Missile Base at Taniak.

== Chapter titles ==
1. Arctic Intrigue (20 min 00s)
2. Murder or Accident? (13 min 20s)
3. Fangs of Death (13 min 20s)
4. Underground Inferno (13 min 20s)
5. Pursuit to Destruction (13 min 20s)
6. The Boat Trap (13 min 20s)
7. Flame Versus Gun (13 min 20s)
8. Highway of Horror (13 min 20s)
9. Doomed Cargo (13 min 20s)
10. Human Quarry (13 min 20s) -- Re-cap Chapter
11. Mechanical Homicide (13 min 20s)
12. Cavern of Revenge (13 min 20s)

_{Source:}
