= Man with the Steel Whip =

1954 film by Franklin Adreon

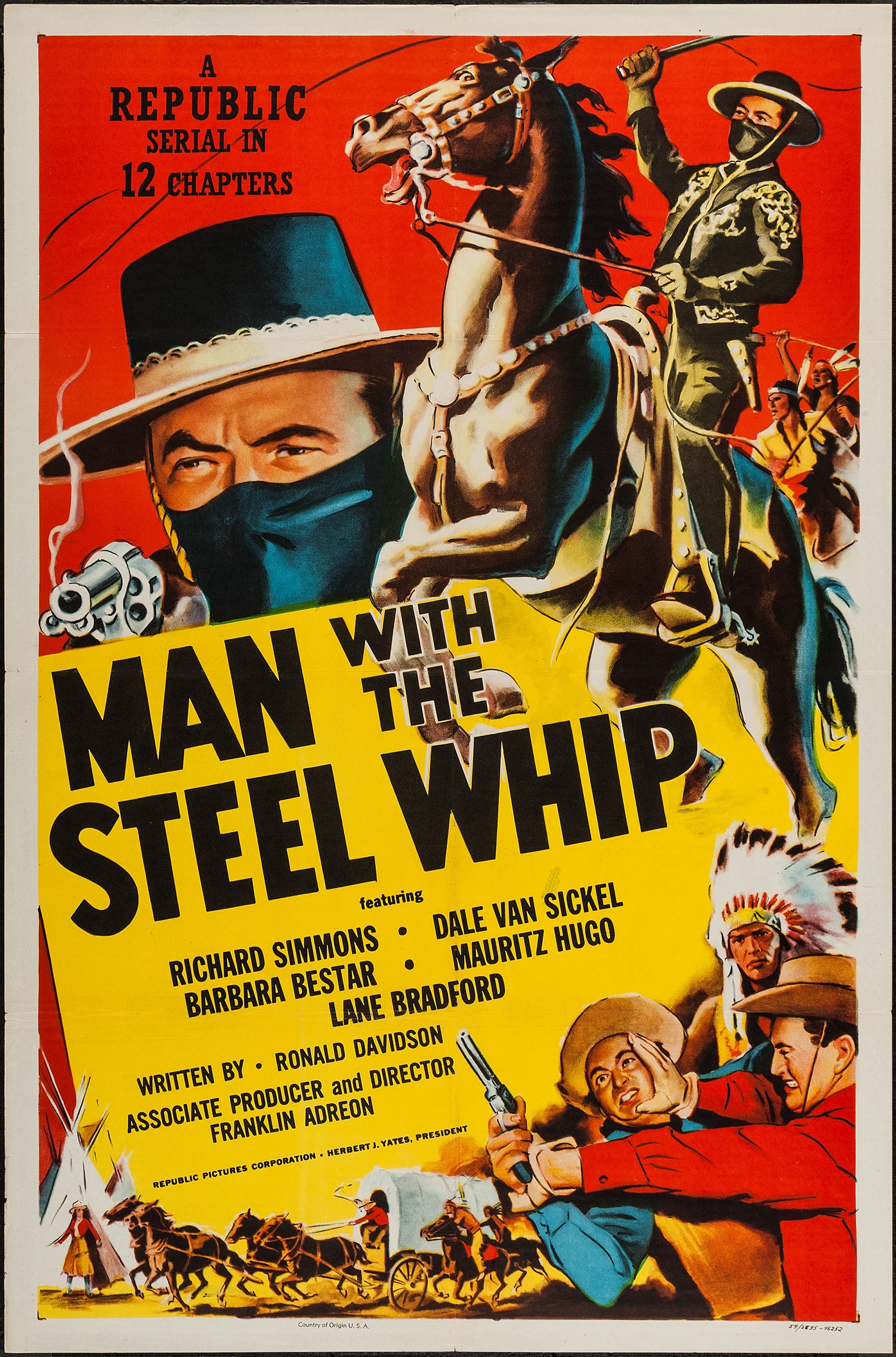
- Directed by: Franklin Adreon
- Written by: Ronald Davidson
- Produced by: Franklin Adreon
- Starring: Dick Simmons; Barbara Bestar; Dale Van Sickel; Mauritz Hugo; Lane Bradford
- Cinematography: Bud Thackery
- Distributed by: Republic Pictures
- Release date: July 19, 1954 (U.S.)
- Running time: 12 chapters (167 minutes)
- Country: United States
- Language: English
- Budget: $172,794 (negative cost: $174,718)

Man with the Steel Whip is a 1954 Republic Western serial film. It uses considerable stock footage from the previous Republic serials "Zorro's Black Whip", "The Painted Stallion" and "Daredevils of the West."

== Plot ==
Saloon owner Barnett wants the land on the local Indian reservation for its gold deposits. In order to remove the people living on the reservation, he forms a gang to attack the local ranchers and frame the Indians. Rancher Jerry Randall opposes him using the legendary masked identity of El Latigo, a friend to the Indians.

== Cast ==
- Richard Simmons as Jerry Randall, a rancher, and the secret identity of El Latigo, legendary masked hero
- Barbara Bestar as Nancy Cooper, school teacher
- Mauritz Hugo as Barnett, saloon owner and villain attempting a land grab
- Dale Van Sickel as Crane, a henchman
- Lane Bradford as Tosco
- Pat Hogan as the Indian Chief
- Roy Barcroft as the Sheriff

=== Stunts ===
- Tom Steele as Jerry Randall/Henchman Tom/Henchman Gage (doubling Dick Simmons)
- Babe De Freest as El Latigo (doubling Dick Simmons via stock footage)
- Guy Teague as Price
- Chuck Hayward as Barn Henchman
- Robert "Buzz" Henry as Orco
- Walt La Rue as a townsman
- Eddie Parker (via stock footage)
- Bill Yrigoyen (via stock footage)
- Joe Yrigoyen (via stock footage)

== Production ==
Man with the Steel Whip was budgeted at $172,794 although the final negative cost was $174,718 (a $1,924, or 1.1%, overspend). It was the most expensive Republic serial of 1954.

It was filmed between March 2 and 22 of 1954 under the working title Man with a Whip. The serial's production number was 1938.

Man with the Steel Whip used stock footage from all of the previous Zorro serials produced by Republic Pictures. As a result, the costume and body shape of the hero El Latigo change between scenes, even becoming female in scenes taken from Zorro's Black Whip (1944).

The serial contains many mistakes; for example, Nancy occasionally refers to the character Jerry Randall as Dick (Richard Simmons' real name).

The film's special effects were handled by the Lydecker brothers.

== Release ==
Man with the Steel Whip's official release date was July 19, 1954, although that was the date on which the sixth chapter was made available to film exchanges.

The film's release was followed by a rerelease of The Phantom Rider, retitled as Ghost Riders of the West, instead of a new serial. The next new serial, Panther Girl of the Kongo, followed in 1955.

== Chapter titles ==
1. The Spirit Rider (20:00)
2. Savage Fury (13:20)
3. Mask of El Latiago (13:20)
4. The Murder Cave (13:20)
5. The Stone Guillotine (13:20)
6. Flame and Battle (13:20)
7. Double Ambush (13:20)
8. The Blazing Barrier (13:20)
9. The Silent Informer (13:20)
10. Window of Death (13:20) (recap chapter)
11. The Fatal Masquerade (13:20)
12. Redskin Raiders (13:20)

== See also ==
- List of film serials
- List of film serials by studio

Preceded by Trader Tom of the China Seas (1953)	Republic Serial; Man with the Steel Whip (1954)	Succeeded by Panther Girl of the Kongo (1955)
