= Government Agents vs. Phantom Legion =

1951 film by Fred C. Brannon

- Directed by: Fred C. Brannon
- Written by: Ronald Davidson
- Produced by: Franklin Adreon
- Starring: Walter Reed; John Pickard; Dick Curtis; Mary Ellen Kay; Fred Coby; Pierce Lyden; George Meeker
- Cinematography: John L. Russell
- Edited by: Cliff Bell
- Music by: Stanley Wilson
- Distributed by: Republic Pictures
- Release date: July 14, 1951
- Running time: 12 chapters, 167 minutes
- Country: United States
- Language: English
- Budget: $153,083 (negative cost: $153,612)

Government Agents vs. Phantom Legion (1951) is a 12-chapter American black-and-white action film serial produced and distributed by Republic Pictures Corporation in 1951. The film was produced by Franklin Adreon and directed by Fred C. Brannon, from an original screenplay by Ronald Davidson.

== Plot ==
Two American government agents, Hal Duncan and Sam Bradley, must prevent Regan and Cady, henchmen for a foreign power, from hijacking defense materials being transported by trucks. Duncan and Bradley are hired by an interstate trucking association, whose constituent truck lines have been principal targets of the hijacking. It later becomes evident that one of the four directors of the association is "The Voice," the secret leader of the gang, who provides Regan and Cody with shipment and route information necessary for the gang's success.

== Cast ==
- Walter Reed as Hal Duncan
- John Pickard as Sam Bradley
- Dick Curtis as Regan
- Mary Ellen Kay as Kay Roberts
- Fred Coby as Cady
- Pierce Lyden as Armstrong
- Arthur Space as Crandall
- Mauritz Hugo as Thompson
- George Meeker as Willard

Stunts

- Dale Van Sickel as Brice/Kern (also doubling Walter Reed)
- Tom Steele as Brandt/Warehouse Thug (also doubling Dick Curtis and Pierce Lyden)
- Eddie Parker as Payne
- Duke Taylor as Kirk
- David Sharpe

== Production ==
Republic had been economizing on its serials, shortening the running time from an average of 18 minutes per chapter to 13, and reusing cliffhanger endings from older serials to avoid staging new ones. The studio also stopped licensing expensive comic-strip and radio properties (like The Lone Ranger, Dick Tracy, and Captain America) and instead filmed generic cops-and-robbers adventures and original science-fiction stories. The studio scaled back production as well, from four new serials per year to three. (The fourth would now be a reissue of an older serial.)

Republic's serials of the 1930s and 1940s had been scripted by writers working in teams, with as many as seven authors contributing to a single screenplay. Government Agents vs. Phantom Legion was written by only one man: Ronald Davidson. Davidson was the ideal choice because he had written and/or produced many Republic serials, and therefore knew where to consult the old film footage, and how to work it into his new screenplay. Most of Government Agents vs. Phantom Legion is new material, but Davidson's 12-chapter script incorporates clips from six older Republic serials.

Leading man Walter Reed recalled, "One reason they wanted me was because I looked a lot like Ralph Byrd -- 15 feet away you couldn't tell us apart -- and they had all these stock shots from his Dick Tracy serials. I must have driven 20 different cars to match stock footage they had. We'd do 60 to 70 [camera] setups in a day [and] we'd do 25 pages of script in a day. In an A film, you'd do two pages a day. You work so hard in serials that you don't have time to socialize. You hit your marks, do your lines, and move on."

Government Agents vs. Phantom Legion was the least expensive Republic serial of 1951, budgeted at $153,083 although the final negative cost was $153,612 (an overspend of $529, or 0.3%). The script's working title was Government Agents vs. Underground Legion, but the film went into production as Government Agents vs. Phantom Legion on May 1, 1951, as confirmed by The Hollywood Reporter. The serial's production number was 1931, and filming concluded on May 23, 1951. All special effects in Government Agents vs. Phantom Legion were created by Republic's in-house team of Howard and Theodore Lydecker.

== Release ==
Government Agents vs. Phantom Legion was released on July 14, 1951. (One source cites the date as July 4, which was when the sixth chapter was made available to film exchanges, but trade publications The Exhibitor and Boxoffice agree on the July 14 release date.)

The film was followed by a re-release of Haunted Harbor, retitled Pirates' Harbor, instead of a new serial. The next new serial, Radar Men from the Moon, followed in 1952.

== Reception ==
The Exhibitor graded Government Agents vs. Phantom Legion as only a "fair" serial but had good words for the first chapter, which the reviewer sampled: "Crammed with fast-moving action, including demolition of trucks, fast motor chases, fist fights, pistol battles, etc., this gets off to a good start. It will satisfy the kids and serial addicts." The serial was popular among exhibitors and circulated in American theaters for three years, with the final chapter playing on July 4, 1954 in Great Falls, Montana.

== Chapter titles ==
1. River of Fire (20 min., includes footage from Spy Smasher, 1942)
2. The Stolen Corpse (13:20, includes footage from The Black Widow, 1947)
3. The Death Drop (13:20, includes footage from Dick Tracy vs. Crime, Inc., 1941)
4. Doorway to Doom (13:20)
5. Deadline for Disaster (13:20)
6. Mechanical Homicide (13:20, includes footage from Captain America, 1944)
7. The Flaming Highway (13:20, includes footage from Mysterious Doctor Satan, 1940)
8. Sea Saboteurs (13:20, includes footage from Dick Tracy vs. Crime, Inc., 1941)
9. Peril Underground (13:20, includes footage from King of the Forest Rangers, 1946)
10. Execution by Accident (13:20, recap chapter)
11. Perilous Plunge (13:20)
12. Blazing Retribution (13:20)

== See also ==
- List of film serials by year
- List of film serials by studio

Preceded by Don Daredevil Rides Again (1950)	Republic Serial; Government Agents vs Phantom Legion (1951)	Succeeded by Radar Men from the Moon (1952)
