= Manhunt of Mystery Island =

1945 film

- Directed by: Spencer Gordon Bennet; Yakima Canutt; Wallace Grissell
- Written by: Albert DeMond; Basil Dickey; Jesse Duffy; Alan James; Grant Nelson; Joseph Poland
- Produced by: Ronald Davidson
- Starring: Richard Bailey; Linda Stirling; Roy Barcroft; Kenne Duncan; Forrest Taylor; Forbes Murray; Jack Ingram; Harry Strang
- Cinematography: Bud Thackery
- Distributed by: Republic Pictures
- Release dates: March 17, 1945 (U.S. serial); January 2, 1956 (re-release); 1966 (U.S. TV)
- Running time: 15 chapters (219 minutes (serial); 100 minutes (TV)
- Country: United States
- Language: English
- Budget: $167,912 (negative cost: $182,388)

Manhunt of Mystery Island is a 1945 science fiction movie serial. It was the thirty-sixth serial produced by Republic Pictures (of a total of sixty-six) and the first released in 1945.

It is the penultimate 15-chapter serial to be released by the studio. The year 1945, the end of the Golden Age of Serials, was the last in which Republic released any 15-chapter serials, the remainder being either 12 or 13 chapters in length.

In 1966 footage from the serial was edited together into the 100-minute film Captain Mephisto and the Transformation Machine.

Three of the serial's cliffhanger gags and set pieces are copied in Indiana Jones and the Temple of Doom.

== Plot ==
A breakthrough scientific device will revolutionize the world's energy usage if the kidnapped creator can be found. To rescue her father, Claire Forrest enlists the help of private detective, Lance Reardon. Clues lead them to a remote Pacific isle known only as Mystery Island, where the two confront sinister and astonishing forces. The descendants of a long-dead pirate, Captain Mephisto are holding the scientist for their own gain. Worst of all, one of the heirs possesses a Transformation Machine with the impossible ability of changing him into the molecular duplicate of his ancestor, Mephisto.

== Cast ==
- Richard Bailey as Lance Reardon, a private detective
- Linda Stirling as Claire Forrest, daughter of Professor Forrest
- Roy Barcroft as Higgins and Captain Mephisto
- Kenne Duncan as Sidney Brand
- Forrest Taylor as Professor William Forrest, inventor of the Radiatomic Power Transmitter
- Forbes Murray as Professor Harry Hargraves
- Jack Ingram as Edward Armstrong
- Harry Strang as Frederick "Fred" Braley
- Ed Cassidy as Paul Melton

== Production ==
Manhunt of Mystery Island was budgeted at $167,912 although the final negative cost was $182,388 (a $14,476, or 8.6%, overspend).

It was filmed between 16 October and 18 November 1944 under the working titles Mystery Island and Manhunt. The serial's production number was 1496.

== Release ==
=== Theatrical ===
Manhunt of Mystery Island's official release date is 17 March 1945, although this is actually the date the seventh chapter was made available to film exchanges.

The serial was re-released on 2 January 1956 between the similar re-releases of Dick Tracy's G-Men and Adventures of Frank and Jesse James. The last original Republic serial release was King of the Carnival in 1955.

=== Television ===
Manhunt of Mystery Island was one of twenty-six Republic serials re-released as a "Century 66" film on television in 1966. The title of the film was changed to Captain Mephisto and the Transformation Machine. This version was cut down to 100 minutes in length.

== Chapter titles ==
1. Secret Weapon (24min 38s)
2. Satan's Web (14min 27s)
3. The Murder Machine (14min 26s)
4. The Lethal Chamber (14min 27s)
5. Mephisto's Mantrap (14min 26s)
6. Ocean Tomb (14min 27s)
7. The Death Trap (14min 27s)
8. Bombs Away (14min 26s)
9. The Fatal Flood (13min 20s)
10. The Sable Shroud (13min 20s) - a re-cap chapter
11. Satan's Shadow (13min 20s)
12. Cauldron of Cremation (13min 20s)
13. Bridge to Eternity (13min 20s)
14. Power Dive to Doom (13min 20s)
15. Fatal Transformation (13min 20s)

_{Source:}

== See also ==
- List of film serials
- List of film serials by studio

Preceded by Zorro's Black Whip (1944)	Republic Serial; Manhunt of Mystery Island (1945)	Succeeded by Federal Operator 99 (1945)
