= The Tiger Woman (1944 film) =

1944 film by Wallace Grissell, Spencer Gordon Bennet

- Directed by: Spencer Bennet; Wallace Grissell
- Written by: Royal Cole; Ronald Davidson; Basil Diskey; Jesse Duffy; Grant Nelson; Joseph Poland
- Produced by: William J. O'Sullivan
- Starring: Linda Stirling; Allan Lane; Duncan Renaldo; George J. Lewis; LeRoy Mason; Crane Whitley; Robert Frazer; Rico De Montez
- Cinematography: Bud Thackery; Ernest Miller
- Distributed by: Republic Pictures
- Release dates: May 27, 1944 (U.S. serial); January 17, 1951 (re-release); 1966 (TV)
- Running time: 12 chapters (196 minutes (serial); 100 minutes (TV)
- Country: United States
- Language: English
- Budget: $180,292 (negative cost: $206,191)

The Tiger Woman (1944) is a 12-chapter film serial by Republic Pictures starring Allan Lane and Linda Stirling (her serial debut). The serial was re-released in 1951 under the title Perils of the Darkest Jungle and, in 1966, it was edited into the 100-minute Century-66 film Jungle Gold.

Stirling was immediately popular in The Tiger Woman. Due to her impact, Zorro's Black Whip was quickly put into production with her as the main star.

Linda Stirling is a jungle girl lost in the South American rainforest and ruling a native tribe. The serial's plot is a variant on the common serial and B-Western "land grab" plot - in this case, the villains attempt to run the natives off the land so that they can claim its valuable oil reserves.

== Plot ==
Evil oil speculators in South America attempt to drive away a native tribe and their leader, the Tiger Woman. The Tiger Woman, a white woman, might be the lost heiress to a vast fortune, and later plotlines in the serial are built around determining her true identity.

== Cast ==
- Linda Stirling as Tiger Woman/Rita Arnold
- Allan Lane as Allen Saunders
- Duncan Renaldo as José Delgado
- George J. Lewis as Morgan
- LeRoy Mason as Fletcher Walton
- Crane Whitley as Tom Dagget
- Robert Frazer as Ramgah, High Priest
- Rico De Montez as Tegula
- Stanley Price as Mack, Dagget's Clerk

== Production ==
The Tiger Woman was budgeted at $180,292 although the final negative cost was $206,191 (a $25,899, or 14.4%, overspend). It was the most expensive Republic serial of 1944. This serial had the third biggest budget of the sixty-six Republic serials (exceeded only by Captain America (1944) at $182,623 and The Lone Ranger Rides Again (1939) at $193,878) although it is only the fifth most expensive in terms of the actual production cost. The other four, however, were all 15-chapters long, compared to Tiger Woman's 12-chapters, so this is, per chapter, the most expensive of all Republic serials.

It was filmed at Lake Sherwood, California locations between 20 January and 25 February 1944 under the working title Tiger Woman of the Amazon. The serial's production number was 1298. The Tiger Woman was Republic's attempt to create a new Pearl White with their recent discovery of Linda Stirling.

Stedman notes several errors in the production: The Tiger Woman costume is made from leopard fur. When outside, the natives are dressed as Navaho but, when inside, they are dressed as Aztecs. The chorus girl line, and their "harem-girl" costume, during an execution is frowned on. The men in the serial do not remove their hats whether inside or out. However, in South America "Tiger" refers to any big cat.

=== Stunts ===
- Babe DeFreest as Tiger Woman/Rita Arnold (doubling Linda Stirling)
- Tom Steele as Allen Saunders/Tunnel Thug/Road Block Thug/Ambusher (doubling Allan Lane)
- Ken Terrell as José Delgado/Morgan/Mack/Fletcher Walton/Bolton/Depot Thug/Oil Truck Driver (doubling Duncan Renaldo, George J. Lewis, Stanley Price & LeRoy Mason)
- Eddie Parker as Tom Dagget/Office Thug/Depot Thug/Trooper/Travis/Oil Truck Thug (doubling Crane Whitley)
- Duke Greene as Gentry/Steward-Thug/Motor Boat Thug/Truck Driver/Shack Heavy/Ambusher (doubling Kenne Duncan)
- Carey Loftin as Thug

=== Special effects ===
The special model effects were produced by Theodore Lydecker.

== Release ==
=== Theatrical ===
The Tiger Woman's official release date is 27 May 1944, although this is actually the date the sixth chapter was made available to film exchanges. The serial was re-released on 17 January 1951, under the new title Perils of the Darkest Jungle, between the first runs of Flying Disc Man from Mars and Don Daredevil Rides Again.

=== Television ===
The Tiger Woman was one of twenty-six Republic serials re-released as a Century-66 film on television in 1966. The title of the film was changed to Jungle Gold. This version was cut down to 100-minutes in length.

== Critical reception ==
Stedman believes that, when compared to the earlier Witney-English serials, The Tiger Woman is a poor serial.

== Chapter titles ==
1. The Temple of Terror (24min 52s)
2. Doorway to Death (15min 33s)
3. Cathedral of Carnage (15min 32s)
4. Echo of Eternity (15min 34s)
5. Two Shall Die (15min 34s)
6. Dungeon of the Doomed (15min 33s)
7. Mile-a-Minute Murder (15min 33s)
8. Passage to Peril (15min 33s)
9. Cruise to Cremation (15min 33s)
10. Target for Murder (15min 33s)
11. The House of Horror (15min 33s)
12. Triumph Over Treachery (15min 34s)

_{Source:}

This was one of the two 12-chapter serials produced by Republic Pictures in 1944. The other, also starring Linda Stirling, was Zorro's Black Whip. As was customary for Republic, two 15-chapter serials were also released in this year.

== See also ==
- List of film serials
- List of film serials by studio

Preceded by Captain America (1944)	Republic Serial; The Tiger Woman (1944)	Succeeded by Haunted Harbor (1944)
