= Desperadoes of the West =

1950 film

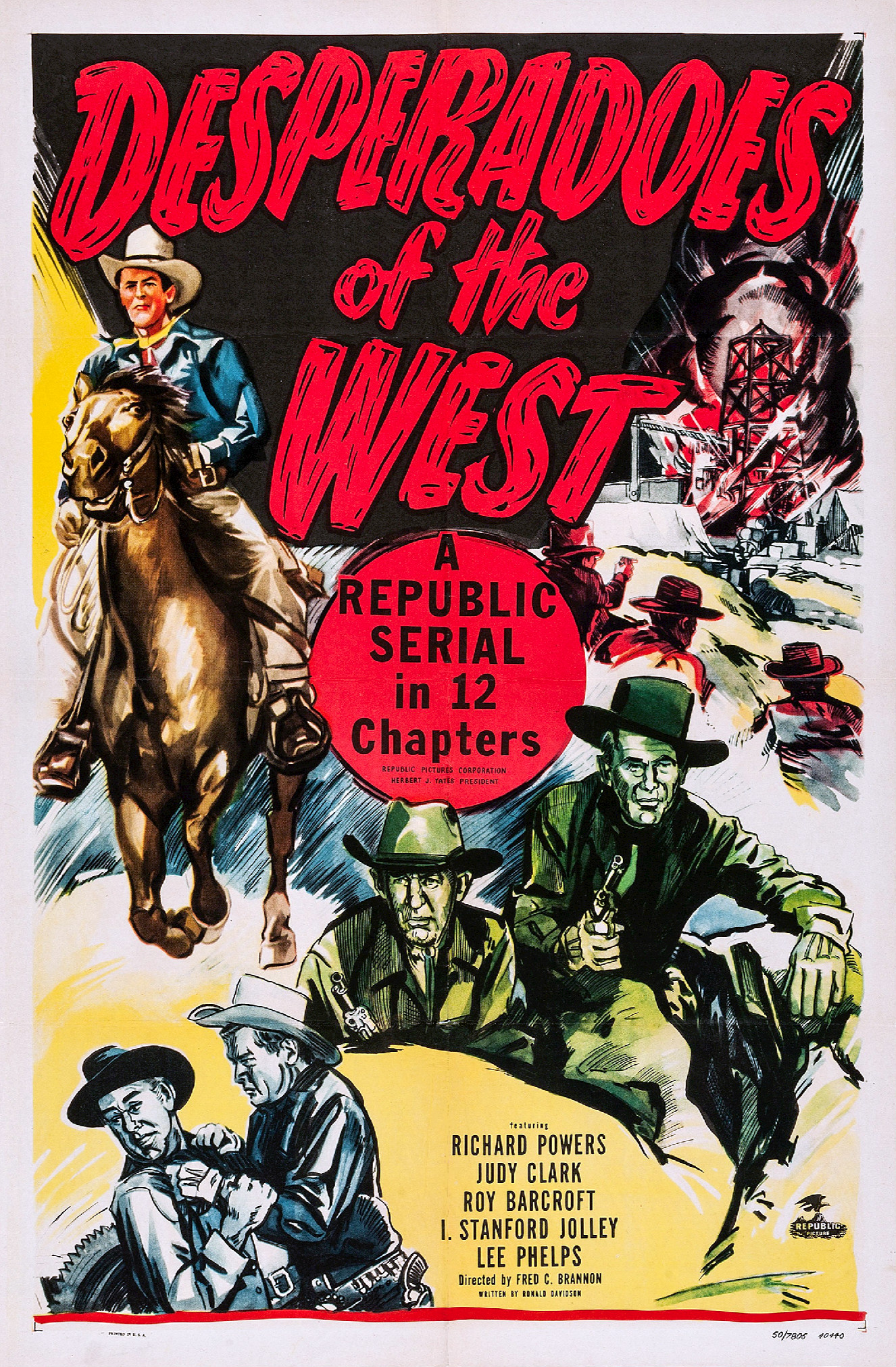
- Directed by: Fred C. Brannon
- Written by: Ronald Davidson
- Produced by: Franklin Adreon
- Starring: Tom Keene; Judy Clark; Roy Barcroft; I. Stanford Jolley; Lee Phelps; Lee Roberts; Cliff Clark
- Cinematography: John MacBurnie
- Music by: Stanley Wilson
- Distributed by: Republic Pictures
- Release date: August 2, 1950 (U.S.)
- Running time: 12 chapters / 167 minutes
- Country: United States
- Language: English
- Budget: $153,081 (negative cost: $150,246)

Desperadoes of the West (1950) is a 12-chapter Republic film serial.

== Plot ==
Colonel Arnold and Ward Gordon lead a group of local ranchers in drilling an oil well, but they have to contend with a band of outlaws trying to stop them every step of the way.

== Cast ==
- Tom Keene as Ward Gordon (credited as Richard Powers)
- Judy Clark as Sally Arnold
- Roy Barcroft as Hacker, a henchman
- I. Stanford Jolley as J. B. "Dude" Dawson
- Lee Phelps as Rusty Steele
- Lee Roberts as Larson, a henchman
- Cliff Clark as Colonel Arnold
- Guy Teague as Jack

== Production ==
Desperadoes of the West was budgeted at $153,081 although the final negative cost was $150,246 (a $2,835, or 1.9%, under spend). It was the cheapest Republic serial of 1950.

It was filmed between May 31 and June 22, 1950 under the working titles Bandit King of Oklahoma and Desperado Kings of the West. The serial's studio production number was 1708.

=== Stunts ===
- Tom Steele as Ward Gordon (doubling Richard Powers)
- Dale Van Sickel as Hacker/Ward Gordon (doubling Roy Barcroft & Richard Powers)
- John Daheim

=== Special effects ===
Special effects by the Lydecker brothers.

== Release ==
=== Theatrical ===
Desperadoes of the West's official release date is 2 August 1950, although this is actually the date the sixth chapter was made available to film exchanges.

== Chapter titles ==
1. Tower of Jeopardy (20min)
2. Perilous Barrier (13min 20s)
3. Flaming Cargo (13min 20s)
4. Trail of Terror (13min 20s)
5. Plunder Cave (13min 20s)
6. Six-Gun Hijacker (13min 20s)
7. The Powder Keg (13min 20s)
8. Desperate Venture (13min 20s)
9. Stagecoach to Eternity (13min 20s)
10. Hidden Desperado (13min 20s) - a re-cap chapter
11. Open Warfare (13min 20s)
12. Desperate Gamble (13min 20s)

_{Source:}

== See also ==
- List of film serials by year
- List of film serials by studio

Preceded by The Invisible Monster (1950)	Republic Serial; Desperadoes of the West (1950)	Succeeded by Flying Disc Man from Mars (1950)
