= Panther Girl of the Kongo =

1955 film by Franklin Adreon

- Directed by: Franklin Adreon
- Written by: Ronald Davidson
- Produced by: Franklin Adreon
- Starring: Phyllis Coates; Myron Healey; Arthur Space; John Daheim; Mike Ragan; Morris Buchanan; Roy Glenn
- Cinematography: Bud Thackery
- Distributed by: Republic Pictures
- Release date: January 3, 1955 (U.S. serial)
- Running time: 12 chapters (167 minutes (serial); 100 minutes (TV)
- Country: United States
- Language: English
- Budget: $172,793 (negative cost: $179,341)

Panther Girl of the Kongo is a 1955 Republic movie serial that contains a great deal of stock footage from the 1941 Republic serial Jungle Girl. This was the penultimate of Republic's 66 serial films.

== Plot ==
Mad scientist Dr. Morgan wants sole access to secret diamond mines in the local area of Africa. He breeds giant crayfish ("Claw Monsters") to scare away any other inhabitants. Jean Evans, the Panther Girl and friend Larry Sanders encounter the plot while on a photo safari in the region.

== Cast ==
- Phyllis Coates as Jean Evans, the Panther Girl
- Myron Healey as Larry Sanders, a big game hunter
- Arthur Space as Dr. Morgan, a mad scientist
- John Daheim as Cass, one of Dr. Morgan's henchmen
- Mike Ragan as Rand, one of Dr Morgan's henchmen
- Morris Buchanan as Tembo
- Roy Glenn as Chief Danka
- James Logan as Constable Harris

=== Stunts ===
- Tom Steele as Larry Sanders (doubling Myron Healey)
- Helen Thurston as Jean Evans/Panther Girl (doubling Phyllis Coates)
- David Sharpe as Panther Girl (doubling Phyllis Coates via stock footage from Jungle Girl)
- Fred Graham as Nick Burgass

== Production ==
Panther Girl of the Kongo was budgeted at $172,793, although the final negative cost was $179,341 (a $6,548, or 3.8%, overspend). It was the most expensive Republic serial of 1955.

It was filmed between August 16 and September 4 of 1954 under the working title Panther Woman of the Kongo. The serial's production number was 1939.

In order to use significant stock footage from the earlier Jungle Girl and cheaply pad Panther Girl of the Kongo, a duplicate costume was used. As a result, Republic's last female lead wore the same costume as its first.

The film's special effects were created by the Lydecker brothers. They used real crayfish as the monsters, and employed scaled-down props to create the illusion of gigantic size.

== Release ==
Panther Girl of the Kongo's official release date was January 3, 1955, although this was actually the date when the sixth chapter was made available to film exchanges. This was followed by a rerelease of Jesse James Rides Again instead of a new serial. The last new serial, King of the Carnival, followed in the summer.

The film was one of 26 Republic serials packaged for television broadcast as part of Republic's Century 66 in 1966. The title of the film was changed to The Claw Monsters, and it was trimmed 100 minutes in length.

== Chapter titles ==
1. The Claw Monster (20:00)
2. Jungle Ambush (13:20)
3. The Killer Beast (13:20)
4. Sands of Doom (13:20)
5. Test of Terror (13:20)
6. High Peril (13:20)
7. Timber Trap/Double Trap (Double Trap is the title shown on screen in chapter 7 and at the end of chapter 6) (13:20)
8. Crater of Flame (13:20)
9. River of Death (13:20)
10. Blasted Evidence (13:20) (recap chapter)
11. Double Danger (13:20)
12. House of Doom (13:20)

== See also ==
- List of film serials
- List of film serials by studio

Preceded by Man with the Steel Whip (1954)	Republic Serial; Panther Girl of the Kongo (1955)	Succeeded by King of the Carnival (1955)
