= Guy Teague =

American actor and stuntman

- Born: Albert Guy Teague; January 20, 1913; Mount Vernon, Texas, U.S.
- Died: January 24, 1970 (aged 57); Mineral Wells, Texas, U.S.
- Occupations: Actor, stuntman

Albert Guy Teague (January 20, 1913 – January 24, 1970) was an American actor and stuntman. He was known for serving as a double for Eric Fleming's character Gil Favor in the American western television series Rawhide.

== Life and career ==
Teague was born in Mount Vernon, Texas. He began his career in 1947 in the film King of the Bandits, which starred Gilbert Roland and Angela Greene. Teague then appeared and performed a stunt for the 1948 film Panhandle, which starred Rod Cameron. In the same year, he performed a stunt for the film Adventures of Frank and Jesse James, starring Clayton Moore, Steve Darrell, Noel Neill and George J. Lewis.

In 1950, Teague had credited roles in films that included Jack in Desperadoes of the West (with Tom Keene, Judy Clark, Roy Barcroft, I. Stanford Jolley and Lee Phelps), Blackie in Vigilante Hideout (with Allan Lane) and Pickney in The Showdown (with Wild Bill Elliott, Walter Brennan and Marie Windsor). He made numerous appearances in films such as Giant, Don Daredevil Rides Again, The Phantom Stagecoach, The Kid from Amarillo (as Dirk), A Lawless Street, No Time to Be Young, Fury at Gunsight Pass, Wyoming Renegades (as 'Black Jack' Ketchum), Man with the Steel Whip and Siege at Red River.

Teague's television appearances included Gunsmoke, State Trooper, Colt .45, Tales of Wells Fargo, Gunslinger, Tales of the Texas Rangers, Bat Masterson, Maverick and The Adventures of Kit Carson. He had served as a stunt double for actor John Wayne and numerous other notable actors. In Rawhide, Teague acted as a double for Eric Fleming in his role as Gil Favor, also appearing as a drover throughout the show, and helped Clint Eastwood become more comfortable riding a horse. He was honored in the Stuntmen's Hall of Fame.

== Death ==
Teague died on January 24, 1970, in Mineral Wells, Texas, at the age of 57. He is interred in Elmwood Cemetery.

== Television ==
Year	Title	Role	Notes
1961	Rawhide	Stitch	S4:E2, "The Sendoff"
