= Flying Disc Man from Mars =

1950 film by Fred C. Brannon

- Theatrical release poster
- Directed by: Fred C. Brannon
- Written by: Ronald Davidson
- Produced by: Franklin Adreon
- Starring: Walter Reed; Lois Collier; Gregory Gaye; James Craven; Harry Lauter; Richard Irving
- Cinematography: Walter Strenge
- Music by: Stanley Wilson
- Distributed by: Republic Pictures
- Release date: October 25, 1950
- Running time: 12 chapters / 167 minutes (serial)
- Country: United States
- Language: English
- Budget: $152,640 (negative cost: $157,439)

Flying Disc Man from Mars is a 1950 Republic Pictures 12-chapter black-and-white science fiction adventure film serial, produced by Franklin Adreon, directed by Fred C. Brannon, that stars Walter Reed, Lois Collier, Gregory Gaye, James Craven, Harry Lauter, and Richard Irving. Disc Man is considered a weak example of the serial medium, even compared to other post-World War II serials. In 1958 Republic edited the serial's 167 minutes of footage into a 75-minute feature, released under the new title Missile Monsters.

== Plot ==
Martian invader, Mota (Gregory Gaye), attempts to conquer the Earth as Mars is worried about its use of new atomic technology. The Martians consider that it would be much safer, and beneficial for both Earth and Mars, if the Martians were in charge. Mota, having been shot down by an experimental ray gun, blackmails American scientist, and former Nazi, Dr. Bryant (James Craven) into assisting him and hires some criminals to be his henchmen.

Kent Fowler (Walter Reed), the private pilot who shot down Mota with Dr. Bryant's ray gun, gets caught up in these events while working security for atomic industrial sites.

=== Chapter titles ===
1. "Menace from Mars"
2. "The Volcano's Secret"
3. "Death Rides the Stratosphere"
4. "Execution by Fire"
5. "The Living Projectile"
6. "Perilous Mission"
7. "Descending Doom"
8. "Suicidal Sacrifice"
9. "The Funeral Pyre"
10. "Weapons of Hate" - re-cap chapter
11. "Disaster on the Highway"
12. "Volcanic Vengeance"

_{Source:}

== Cast ==
- Walter Reed as Kent Fowler, pilot
- Lois Collier as Helen Hall
- Gregory Gaye as Mota, martian invader
- James Craven as Dr Bryant, scientist and secretly a former Nazi supporter
- Harry Lauter as Drake, one of Mota's henchmen
- Richard Irving as Ryan, one of Mota's henchmen
- Sandy Sanders as Steve, Kent's sidekick
- Michael Carr as Trent, disc-ship pilot-henchman

== Production ==
Flying Disc Man from Mars was budgeted at $152,640, although the final negative cost was $157,439 (a $4,799, or 3.1%, overspend). It was the most expensive Republic serial made in 1950.

Disc Man was filmed between August 21 and September 12, 1950, under several working titles: Atom Man from Mars, Disc Man from Mars, Disc Men of the Skies, Flying Planet Men, and Jet Man from Mars. The serial's production number was 1709.

This is not a sequel to Republic's earlier serial The Purple Monster Strikes, although the villain Mota wears the Purple Monster costume from that serial.

=== Special effects ===
The flying disc aircraft from Republic's King of the Mounties is reused for this serial (note that the Japanese rising sun logo is still visible), and most of the shots of it in flight are taken from that serial. In some shots this flying wing footage is from Republic's Spy Smasher serial (used in chapter three of Disc Man), where the tail fin is missing (the flying wing was built for Spy Smasher, and the tail-fin with rising sun insignia was added for Republic's King of the Mounties serial).

Other stock footage from several earlier Republic serials was reused to pad out Disc Man in order to lower its production costs. This includes the rocket crash from The Purple Monster Strikes, a car chase from Secret Service in Darkest Africa, and various scenes from G-Men vs. the Black Dragon.

All special effects in this serial were produced by the Lydecker brothers, the in-house duo who designed most of Republic's special effects.

=== Stunts ===
- Dale Van Sickel Kent Fowler/Watchman (doubling Walter Reed)
- David Sharpe Henchman Ryan/Technician (doubling Richard Irving)
- Tom Steele as Henchman Drake/Trent/Taylor (doubling Harry Lauter and Michael Carr)
- Carey Loftin as Truck Loader Thug

== Release ==
=== Theatrical ===
Flying Disc Man from Mars's official release date is 25 October 1950, although this is actually the date the sixth chapter was made available to film exchanges.

This was followed by a re-release of The Tiger Woman, re-titled as Perils of the Darkest Jungle, instead of a new serial. The next new serial, Don Daredevil Rides Again, followed in spring of 1951.

A 75-minute feature film version was created by editing the serial's footage, and was released on March 28, 1958, under the new title Missile Monsters as a double feature with Satan's Satellites. It was one of 14 feature films Republic made from their serials.

== See also ==
- 1950 in film
- List of science fiction films of the 1950s
