= G-Men vs. the Black Dragon =

1943 film by Spencer Gordon Bennet

G-Men vs. The Black Dragon
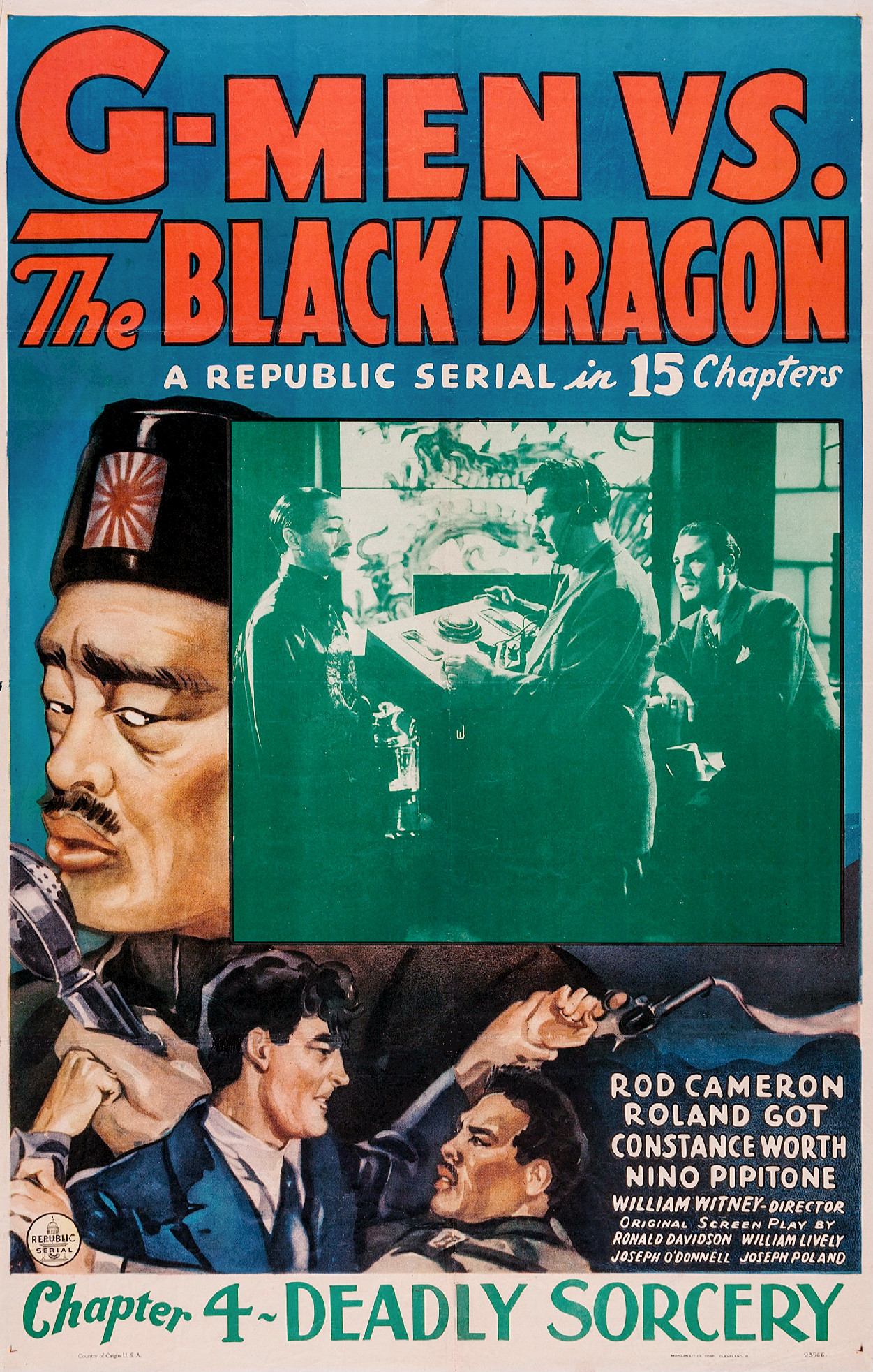
- Directed by: Spencer Gordon Bennet; William Witney; William J O'Sullivan
- Written by: Ronald Davidson; William Lively; Joseph O'Donnell; Joseph Poland
- Produced by: William J. O'Sullivan
- Starring: Rod Cameron; Roland Got; Constance Worth; Nino Pipitone; Noel Cravat; George J. Lewis
- Cinematography: Bud Thackery
- Release dates: January 16, 1943 (U.S. serial); 1966 (U.S. TV)
- Running time: 15 chapters / 243 minutes (serial); 100 minutes (TV)
- Country: United States
- Language: English
- Budget: $148,445 (negative cost: $156,599)

G-Men vs. The Black Dragon (1943) is a Republic Pictures movie serial. It is noteworthy among adventure serials as containing an unusually high number of fistfights, all staged by director William Witney and a team of stuntmen.

This was Witney's last production before leaving to serve in World War II. He actually shipped out before filming was complete. It also sees the return of Witney's wife, Maxine Doyle, to acting for the first time since they met on the set of an earlier serial, S O S Coast Guard (1937).

== Plot ==
After Japanese spies from the Black Dragon Society infiltrate United States borders, Federal Agent Rex Bennett is enlisted by the government to capture them. As Oyama Haruchi, leader of the dangerous paramilitary group, begins to destabilize the United States war effort through sabotage and corruption, Bennett must team up with British special agent Vivian Marsh and Chinese special agent Chang Sing to stop them and help win the war.

== Cast ==
- Rod Cameron as US agent Rex Bennett
- Roland Got as Chinese agent Chang Sing
- Constance Worth as British agent Vivian Marsh
- Nino Pipitone as Oyama Haruchi, Japanese spy and leader of the Black Dragon Society
- Noel Cravat as Ranga, Haruchi's assistant
- George J. Lewis as Lugo, Haruchi's assistant

== Production ==
G-Men vs. The Black Dragon was commissioned based on the success of the serial Spy Smasher, although the production team preferred to have a non-costumed character.

G-Men vs. The Black Dragon was budgeted at $148,445 although the final negative cost was $156,599 (a $8,154, or 5.5%, overspend).

It was filmed between 26 September and 11 November 1942. The serial's production number was 1198.

This was director William Witney's last production before leaving to serve in World War II, he actually shipped out before filming was complete. Witney arranged for his wife, Maxine Doyle, to be auditioned for a part as he would be leaving her in the United States for the duration of the war. It was also arranged that she was the only candidate for the role, but this was not revealed to her until she arrived for the audition. This was her first time acting role since the couple met on the set of an earlier serial, S O S Coast Guard (1937). This arrangement almost led to slight trouble in the relationship when Australian actress Constance Worth turned up at Witney's hotel room drunk. She was led away by a colleague before Maxine became aware of her presence.

Rod Cameron's characterization of federal agent Rex Bennett was so successful that Republic hurriedly made changes to Cameron's next serial, already in production. It became an unofficial sequel, Secret Service in Darkest Africa, with Cameron's reprising the character of Rex Bennett, and the feminine lead taken by Joan Marsh playing Janet Blake, a British reporter.

In 1966 the serial was edited into a feature titled Black Dragon of Manzanar. It played on television as part of Republic's "Century 66" package of 100-minute serial adaptations.

=== Special effects ===
All the special effects in this serial were produced by Republic's in-house effects team, the Lydecker brothers. Many of the scenes were filmed so impressively that Republic reused them in later serials.

=== Stunts ===
- Tom Steele as Rex Bennett (doubling Rod Cameron)
- Duke Taylor as Lugo (doubling George J. Lewis)
- Ken Terrell as Ranga & Chang Sing (doubling Noel Cravat and Roland Got)
- Dale Van Sickel (doubling Stanley Price)
- John Daheim (doubling Crane Whitley and Harry Burns)

== Release ==
=== Theatrical ===
G-Men vs. The Black Dragon's official release date is January 16, 1943, although this is actually the date the seventh chapter was made available to film exchanges.

=== Television ===
G-Men vs. The Black Dragon was one of twenty-six Republic serials re-released as a film on television in 1966. The title of the film was changed to Black Dragon of Manzanar. This version was cut down to 100-minutes in length.

== Critical reception ==
In the words of Cline, both this serial and its sequel were "well-made topical drama with highly capable and professional casts." In a departure from the normal formula, the villain's identity is known to the audience.

== Chapter titles ==
1. The Yellow Peril (25min 26s)
2. Japanese Inquisition (15min 34s)
3. Arsenal of Doom (15min 32s)
4. Deadly Sorcery (15min 34s)
5. Celestial Murder (15min 36s)
6. Death and Destruction (15min 35s)
7. The Iron Monster (15min 35s)
8. Beast of Tokyo (15min 39s)
9. Watery Grave (15min 31s)
10. The Dragon Strikes (15min 34s)
11. Suicide Mission (15min 35s)
12. Dead on Arrival (15min 31s)
13. Condemned Cargo (15min 34s)
14. Flaming Coffin (15min 34s)
15. Democracy in Action (15min 40s)

_{Source:}
