= George Selk =

American film and television actor

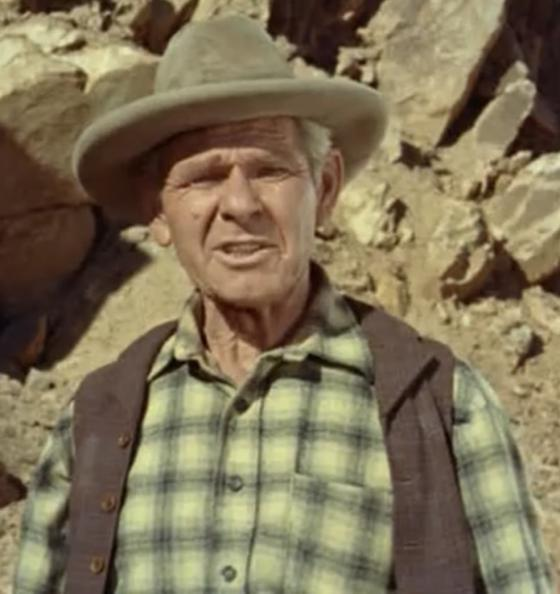
- Selk in Sergeant Preston of the Yukon, 1956
- Born: May 15, 1893; Lincoln, Nebraska, U.S.
- Died: January 22, 1967 (aged 73); Montrose, California, U.S.
- Occupation(s): Film and television actor
- Years active: 1953–1967

George Selk (May 15, 1893 – January 22, 1967) was an American film and television actor. He was known for playing the role of stableman Moss Grimmick in the American western television series Gunsmoke from 1955 to 1963.

Selk portrayed Geppetto in Pinocchio's Christmas in La Canada, California. His other work on stage included acting in a production of Rope in Montrose, California.

== Partial filmography ==
- Cry of the Hunted (1953) - Josh (uncredited)
- It Came from Outer Space (1953) - Tom
- All I Desire (1953) - Townsman (uncredited)
- City of Bad Men (1953) - Old-Timer (uncredited)
- So Big (1953) - Johnnes Ambuul (uncredited)
- Trader Tom of the China Seas (1954) - Ole
- Phantom of the Rue Morgue (1954) - Lamplighter (uncredited)
- Rogue Cop (1954) - Parker (uncredited)
- The Bounty Hunter (1954) - Hotel Guest (uncredited)
- The Silver Chalice (1954) - Audience Member (uncredited)
- Battle Cry (1955) - Old Man (uncredited)
- The Prodigal (1955) - Citizen (uncredited)
- The McConnell Story (1955) - Janitor (uncredited)
- I'll Cry Tomorrow (1955) - Switchman (uncredited)
- Storm Center (1956) - Bill the Elevator Operator (uncredited)
- The Fastest Gun Alive (1956) - Doctor (uncredited)
- Bus Stop (1956) - Elderly Passenger (uncredited)
- The Spirit of St. Louis (1957) - Mechanic (uncredited)
- The Vampire (1957) - Mr. Spine (uncredited)
- The Hard Man (1957) - Clerk (uncredited)
- Gun Fever (1958) - Farmer
- The FBI Story (1959) - Janitor/Organist (uncredited)
- Guns of the Timberland (1960) - Amos Stearns
- The Bramble Bush (1960) - Clerk (uncredited)
- All the Fine Young Cannibals (1960) - Minister (uncredited)
