= The Showdown (1950 film) =

1950 film by Dorrell McGowan

- Theatrical release poster
- Directed by: Dorrell McGowan; Stuart E. McGowan
- Screenplay by: Dorrell McGowan; Stuart E. McGowan
- Produced by: William J. O'Sullivan
- Starring: Wild Bill Elliott; Walter Brennan; Marie Windsor
- Cinematography: Reggie Lanning
- Edited by: Harry Keller
- Music by: Stanley Wilson
- Production company: Republic Pictures
- Distributed by: Republic Pictures
- Release date: August 15, 1950 (United States)
- Running time: 86 minutes
- Country: United States
- Language: English

The Showdown is a 1950 American Western film directed by Dorrell McGowan and Stuart E. McGowan and starring Wild Bill Elliott, Walter Brennan and Marie Windsor.

== Plot ==
A former Texas lawman. Shadrach Jones (William Elliott) sets out to discover who killed his brother and stole their combined savings. While at the saloon run by the beautiful Adelaide (Marie Windsor), Jones becomes convinced that the thieving murderer is one of a group of cowboys on a cattle drive led by Captain MacKellar (Walter Brennan). Determined to find justice, Jones joins the cattle drive and slowly gets closer to uncovering the identity of the killer.

== Cast ==
- Wild Bill Elliott as Shadrach Jones (as William Elliott)
- Walter Brennan as Cap MacKellar
- Marie Windsor as Adelaide
- Harry Morgan as Rod Main (as Henry Morgan)
- Rhys Williams as Chokecherry
- Jim Davis as Cochran
- William Ching as Mike Shattay
- Nacho Galindo as Gonzales
- Leif Erickson as Big Mart
- Henry Rowland as Dutch
- Charles Stevens as Indian Joe
- Victor Kilian as Hemp
- Yakima Canutt as Davis
- Guy Teague as Pickney
- William Steele as Terry
- Jack Sparks as Bartender
