= Captain America (serial) =

1944 Republic black-and-white serial film

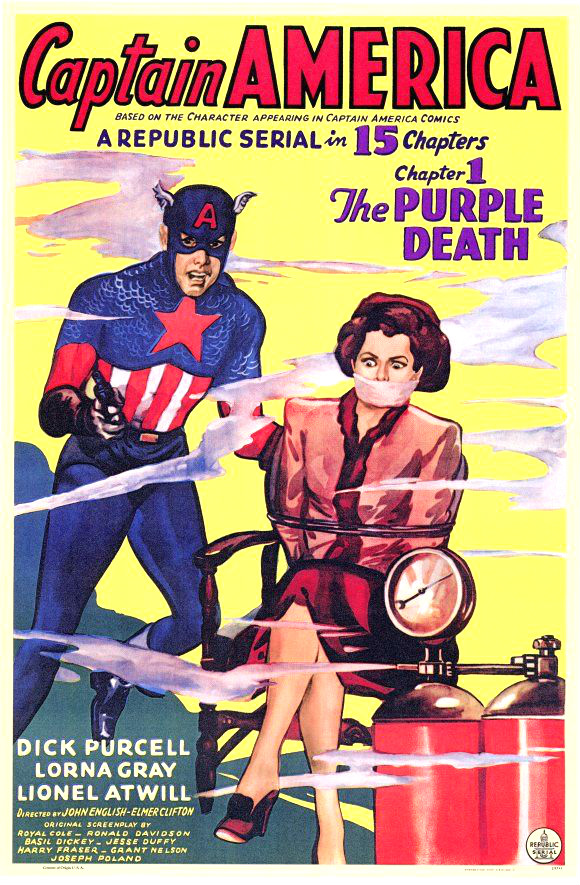
- Theatrical poster
- Directed by: Elmer Clifton; John English
- Written by: Royal Cole; Harry Fraser; Joseph Poland; Ronald Davidson; Basil Dickey; Jesse Duffy; Grant Nelson
- Based on: Captain America by: Jack Kirby; Joe Simon
- Produced by: William J O'Sullivan
- Starring: Dick Purcell; Lorna Gray; Lionel Atwill; Charles Trowbridge; Russell Hicks; George J. Lewis; John Davidson
- Cinematography: John MacBurnie
- Edited by: Wallace Grissell; Earl Turner
- Music by: Mort Glickman
- Distributed by: Republic Pictures
- Release dates: February 5, 1944 (U.S. serial); September 30, 1953 (U.S. re-release)
- Running time: 15 chapters / 243 minutes
- Country: United States
- Language: English
- Budget: $182,623 (negative cost: $222,906)

Captain America is a 1944 Republic black-and-white 15-chapter serial film loosely based on the Timely Comics (now Marvel Comics) character Captain America. It was the last Republic serial made about a superhero. It also has the distinction of being the most expensive serial that Republic ever made. It stands as the first theatrical release connected to a Marvel character. The film was re-released in 1953. It was released in Turkey and became popular, spurring the creation of other Turkish Captain America films such as the 1968 film Binbaşı Tayfun and the 1973 film 3 Dev Adam. It was the first live-action rendition of a Marvel character.

The serial sees Captain America, really District Attorney Grant Gardner, trying to thwart the plans of the Scarab, really museum curator Dr. Cyrus Maldor—especially regarding his attempts to acquire the "Dynamic Vibrator" and "Electronic Firebolt", devices that could be used as super-weapons.

In a rare plot element for Republic, the secret identity of the villain is known to the audience from the beginning, if not to the characters in the serial. The studio's usual approach was the use of a mystery villain who was unmasked as one of the other supporting characters only in the final chapter.

== Plot ==
A rash of suspicious suicides among scientists and businessmen, all found holding a small scarab, gets the attention of Mayor Randolph. He demands that Police Commissioner Dryden and District Attorney Grant Gardner get to the bottom of the case, while openly wishing that Captain America, a masked man who has helped defeat crime in the past, were around to solve the mystery. Gail Richards, Grant Gardner's secretary, investigates and realizes someone knows of the "Purple Death", a hypnotic chemical responsible for the suicides. However, he then pulls out a gun and takes her into another room. He then orders an associate to tie her up. The D.A. realizes she is there and forces the man to take him to her. He finds her tied up and gagged. He frees her, but it is threatened that the purple death will be dropped, killing them all. The D.A. shoots him, then gets out of the room with Gail.

All of the suicides were members of an expedition to some Mayan ruins. One of the few remaining survivors, Professor Lyman, turns to his friend Doctor Maldor for support. Doctor Maldor, however, reveals that he is the man responsible for the deaths. He wants revenge because he planned and organized the expedition, but everyone else claimed the fame and fortune. Lyman has developed the "Dynamic Vibrator" - a device intended for mining operations but one that can be amplified into a devastating weapon. Using his purple death, Doctor Maldor forces Lyman to disclose the location of his plans.

Captain America intervenes as The Scarab's heavies attempt to steal the plans, and this leads to a sequence of plots by The Scarab to acquire a working version, as well as other devices, while trying to eliminate the interfering Captain before he succeeds in discovering Doctor Maldor's true identity or defeats him.

== Cast ==
- Dick Purcell as Grant Gardner / Captain America:
  The character drastically differs from his comic book counterpart, who was a frail soldier named Steve Rogers who underwent a supersoldier experiment to enhance his physiology to the peak of human perfection. These elements are completely omitted, and the character's identity is changed to a District Attorney named Grant Gardner. Purcell was cast as the hero despite, as described by Harmon and Glut, having an average and slightly overweight physique. He died a few weeks after filming was completed; he collapsed in the locker room at a Los Angeles country club. In the opinion of film historian Raymond Stedman, the strain of filming Captain America had been too much for his heart.
- Lorna Gray as Gail Richards, Grant Gardner's secretary
- Lionel Atwill as Doctor Cyrus Maldor/The Scarab
- Charles Trowbridge as Police Commissioner Dryden
- Russell Hicks as Mayor Randolph
- George J. Lewis as Bart Matson
- John Davidson as Gruber
- Frank Reicher as Lyman
- Al Ferguson as Detective (uncredited)
- Howard C. Hickman as Lyman's Attorney (uncredited)
- Tom London as Mack (uncredited)
- Edward Van Sloan as Gregory (uncredited)

== Production ==
Captain America was budgeted at $182,623, although the final negative cost was $222,906 (a $40,283, or 22.1%, overspend). It was the most expensive of all Republic serials (as well as the most over budget). It was filmed between October 12 and November 24, 1943. The serial's production number was 1297. Captain America was written by seven of the top serial screenwriters, including Harry Fraser’s only work at Republic.

The Captain America costume was really gray, white, and dark blue, as these colors photographed better in black and white. The costume also lost the wings on the head, the pirate boots became high shoes, and the chainmail became normal cloth. Miniature flags were added to the gloves, and the belt buckle became a small shield.

Republic was notorious for making changes in its adaptations. This occurred with Captain America more than most. Timely, the owner of Captain America, was unhappy with the omission of Steve Rogers, the lack of an army setting, and his use of a gun. Republic responded in writing that the sample pages provided by Timely did not indicate that Captain America was a soldier called Steve Rogers, nor that he did not carry a revolver. They also noted that the serial was well into production by this point, and they could not return to the original concept without expensive retakes and dubbing. Finally, they pointed out that Republic was under no contractual obligation to do any of this.

The differences between the comic book and film versions of the title character in this serial are more extreme than with other Republic comic adaptations, such as Adventures of Captain Marvel and Spy Smasher. For example:

- His secret identity is District Attorney Grant Gardner rather than U.S. Army Private Steve Rogers.
- The "Super-Soldier Serum" origin is not used.
- His famous shield does not appear, replaced by a standard gun.
- Even though this serial was made in 1944, and Captain America regularly fought Nazis in the comics, the Nazis are not part of the story in any way.
- His sidekick, Bucky, does not appear.

The reason for the differences appears not to be arbitrary, but that the script for the serial originally featured an entirely different licensed lead character, and it was only decided later to replace the original character with Captain America. Film historians Jim Harmon and Don Glut speculated that the script was originally written as a sequel to 1940's Mysterious Doctor Satan, which featured the masked hero The Copperhead. This character was himself a substitution for DC's Superman, after Republic's bid for that character's film rights lost to Paramount, who had a series of cartoon shorts made by the Fleischer Studios, and would later on acquire Republic, as well as distribute a feature-length Captain America film.

Republic previously had adapted Fawcett Comics characters (Captain Marvel and Spy Smasher). Because the lead in Captain America is a crime-fighting district attorney aided by a female secretary who knows his identity, and that the serial includes a chapter entitled "The Scarlet Shroud" in which nothing scarlet appears, film restoration director Eric Stedman suggests that it is more likely that the script was originally developed to feature Fawcett's comic book hero Mr. Scarlet, secretly D.A. Brian Butler, whose comic book appearances had proved unpopular and who had actually disappeared from comic book covers and been relegated to being a backup feature between the time the serial was planned and the final film produced.

Writer Raymond William Stedman believes that the differences between the comic-book and film versions of Captain America were "for the better," as, for example, the hero did not have to sneak out of an army base every time he needed to change identities.

=== Stunts ===
- Dale Van Sickel as Captain America (doubling Dick Purcell)
- Bert LeBaron as Dr. Maldor/The Scarab (doubling Lionel Atwill)
- Helen Thurston as Gail Richards (doubling Lorna Gray)
- Ken Terrell Bart Matson/Dirk (doubling George J. Lewis & Crane Whitley)
- John Bagni
- Fred Graham
- Duke Green
- Eddie Parker
- Allen Pomeroy
- Tom Steele

Dale Van Sickel was the "ramrod" of the stunt crew, doubling Dick Purcell as Captain America. Ken Terrell doubled George J. Lewis, and Fred Graham doubled Lionel Atwill. Additional stunts were performed by Duke Green and Joe Yrigoyen. Tom Steele only appeared in chapter one as he was busy on The Masked Marvel.

=== Special effects ===
All the special effects in Captain America were created by Republic's in-house team, the Lydecker brothers.

== Release ==
Captain America's official release date was 5 February 1944, although this is actually the date the seventh chapter was made available to film exchanges. The serial was filmed in 1943. The serial was re-released on 30 September 1953, under the new title Return of Captain America, between the first runs of Canadian Mounties vs. Atomic Invaders and Trader Tom of the China Seas. All 15 episodes were released on VHS on dual cassettes and later DVD.

=== Copyright status ===
In 1971, the serial’s copyright was renewed by National Telefilm Associates, whose assets later became part of Viacom through a series of acquisitions.

== Critical reception ==
Captain America is regarded as the "apex of the traditional action film fight...[in the] opinion of many cliffhanger enthusiasts". Stedman wrote that this was a "much better serial than either Batman or The Masked Marvel". Dr. Maldor is, in Cline's opinion, Lionel Atwill's best serial role.

== Later references ==
In Captain America vol. 1 #219 (March 1978), it is revealed that a Captain America serial also exists in the Marvel Universe. In the serial, Steve Rogers himself stars as the Star-Spangled Man in secret, and the serial also features the shield being replaced by a standard gun, the identity of Grant Gardner, and Bucky is absent.

In 2007, after the Civil War comic event, Rogers is seemingly killed off. News channel CNN produces a special on his death, and while Rogers' death is focused, the serial is shown. In Captain America #27, the poster is seen in the Captain America museum.

Steve Rogers' ex-girlfriend in the Ultimate Marvel continuity is named after Gail Richards, Grant Gardner's secretary. The 2011 Marvel Cinematic Universe (MCU) film Captain America: The First Avenger features the title character starring in a serial early in his career.

== Chapter titles ==
1. The Purple Death (25:40)
2. Mechanical Executioner (15:38)
3. The Scarlet Shroud (15:33)
4. Preview of Murder (15:33)
5. Blade of Wrath (15:33)
6. Vault of Vengeance (15:33)
7. Wholesale Destruction (15:34)
8. Cremation in the Clouds (15:33)
9. Triple Tragedy (15:33)
10. The Avenging Corpse (15:33)
11. The Dead Man Returns (15:33)
12. Horror on the Highway (15:34)
13. Skyscraper Plunge (15:33)
14. The Scarab Strikes (15:32)
15. The Toll of Doom (15:33)

_{Sources:}

== See also ==
- Captain America in film
- List of American films of 1944
- List of film serials by year
- List of film serials by studio

Preceded by The Masked Marvel (1943)	Republic Serial; Captain America (1944)	Succeeded by The Tiger Woman (1944)
