= Zorro's Black Whip =

1944 film by Spencer Gordon Bennet

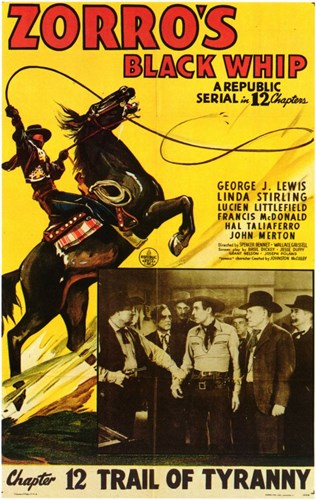
- Directed by: Spencer Gordon Bennet; Wallace Grissell
- Written by: Basil Dickey; Jesse Duffy; Grant Nelson; Joseph Poland; Johnston McCulley (Original Zorro Novel)
- Produced by: Ronald Davidson
- Starring: Linda Stirling; George J. Lewis; Lucien Littlefield; Francis McDonald
- Cinematography: Bud Thackery
- Distributed by: Republic Pictures
- Release dates: December 16, 1944 (U.S. serial); July 8, 1957 (U.S. re-release)
- Running time: 12 chapters (182 minutes)
- Country: United States
- Language: English
- Budget: $134,899 (negative cost: $145,251)

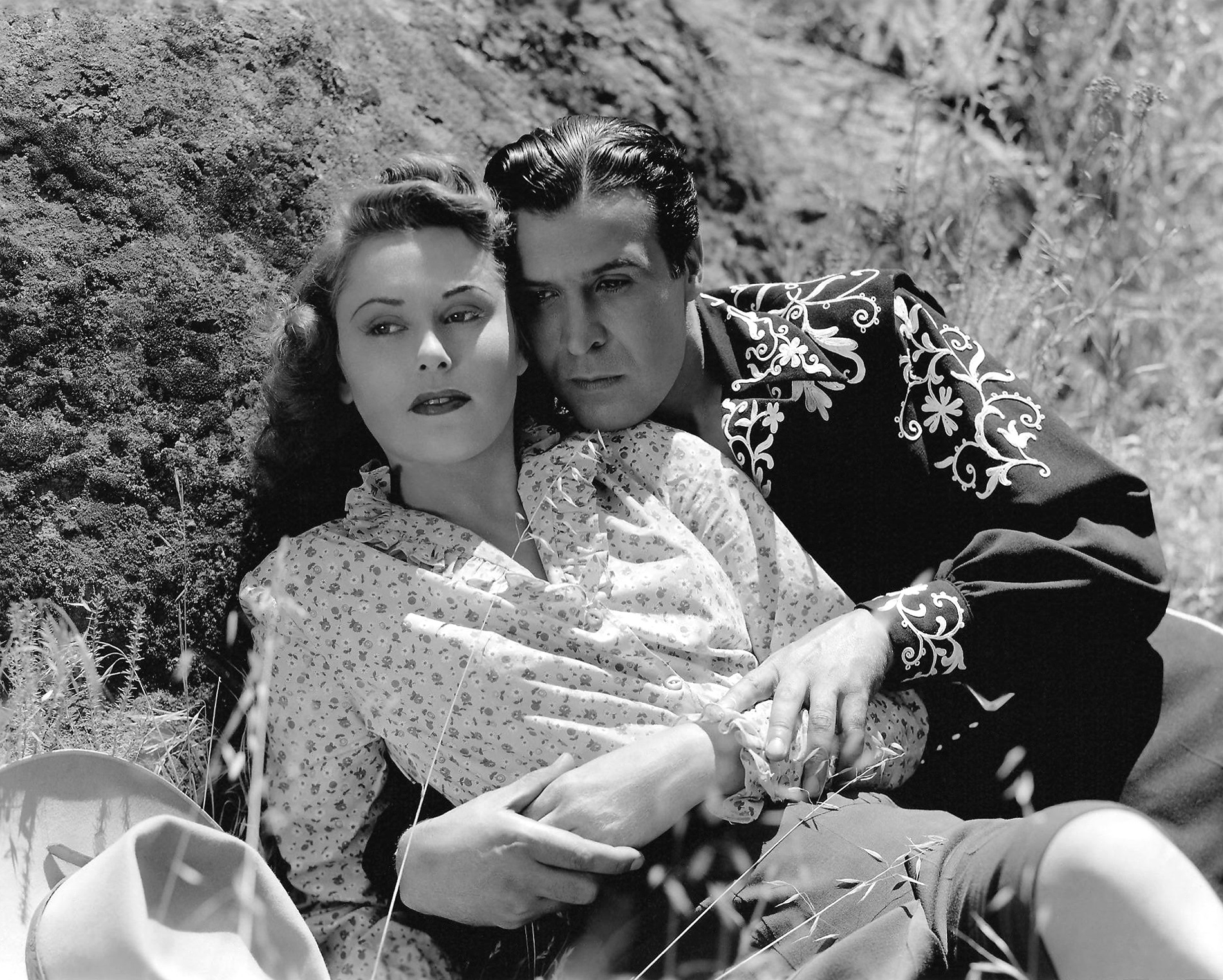
Linda Stirling and George J. Lewis

Zorro's Black Whip, Chapter 1: The Masked Avenger.

Zorro's Black Whip is a 1944 12-chapter film serial by Republic Pictures starring Linda Stirling. The film was made after the 1940 20th Century-Fox remake of The Mark of Zorro in order to capitalize on it. Republic was not able to use the character of Zorro himself, however, and despite the title, the hero(ine) is called The Black Whip throughout.

The serial is set in pre-statehood Idaho, and involves a fight to prevent and ensure statehood by the villains and heroes respectively.

Parts of the serial were reused as stock footage to pad out later serials such as Don Daredevil Rides Again (1951) and Man with the Steel Whip (1954) – despite the fact that both of those serials had male leads.

== Plot ==
In Zorro's Black Whip the word Zorro never occurs, but a woman who behaves like Don Diego in Idaho fights a cabal of corrupt politicians as "The Black Whip" after her brother (the original Black Whip) is killed.

Hammond, owner of the town's stagecoach line and a leading citizen on the council, is secretly opposed to Idaho becoming a state—because government protection would destroy the system and organization he has constructed—and conducts raids against citizens and settlers alike to prevent order, while keeping his own identity as the organization's leader secret. The town marshal is meanwhile powerless to act outside his jurisdiction beyond the town boundary. Randolph Meredith, owner of the town's newspaper, as the Black Whip, opposes this scheme to defeat statehood, but one day he is killed after preventing yet another coup. Meredith's sister Barbara, expert with a bullwhip and pistol, dons Randolph's black costume and mask and becomes "The Black Whip" in her brother's place, dealing a blow to Hammond and his gang each time they perform some heinous act in their efforts to keep the town, and their power over it, unchanged.

Aided by recently arrived undercover United States government agent Vic Gordon, Barbara (Linda Stirling) as The Black Whip is quite obviously female but, even after a bout of wrestling, the villains do not realise they aren't fighting a man. Some reference is made to this in the script, however, when the villains are trying to determine who the Black Whip's secret identity could be:

Hammond: Barbara Meredith, she's the Black Whip! Baxter: She couldn't be! The Black Whip's got to be a man! He's outshot us, outrode us, and outfought us, stopped us at every turn!

— Chapter Nine: Avalanche

Hammond orders her taken, but the day is saved when Vic Gordon discovers Barbara's secret and removes her from suspicion by appearing in her costume and overcoming her captors. From this point on, despite relinquishing the costume at her insistence that she must continue as the Black Whip, he tends to assume the hero role while Barbara becomes slightly more of a traditional damsel in distress, even while she still holds her own in successive violent confrontations with Hammond's henchmen, and more than once saves Vic's life.

After the town has finally voted on whether or not to accept statehood, most of Hammond's gang are gunned down while attempting to steal the ballot boxes. Hammond escapes, and secretly trails and confronts Barbara in her cave when she removes her mask. He takes aim, but is struck down by the Black Whip's stallion. The reign of terror has ended. Vic remains with Barbara and the marshal to help maintain peace in the territory.

== Cast ==
- Linda Stirling as Barbara Meredith, The Black Whip and newspaper proprietrix
- George J. Lewis as Vic Gordon, a US government agent allied with the Black Whip. In a related role, Lewis later portrayed Don Diego de la Vega/Zorro's father, Don Alejandro de la Vega in the Walt Disney television series Zorro.
- Lucien Littlefield as "Tenpoint" Jackson, the comic relief newspaper typesetter working with Barbara Meredith
- Francis McDonald as Dan Hammond, villainous owner of the town's Stagecoach company
- Hal Taliaferro as Baxter, one of Hammond's henchmen
- John Merton as Ed Harris, one of Hammond's henchmen
- Stanley Price as Hedges, Hammond's Clerk-Henchman
- John Hamilton
- Tom Chatterton
- Tom London

The surnames of the two lead characters, Meredith and Gordon, are an in-joke referencing two earlier Republic serials. The character Nyoka the Jungle Girl and her father had the surname Meredith in Jungle Girl, but their last name was Gordon in the semi-sequel Perils of Nyoka.

== Production ==
This serial was put into production, with Linda Stirling as the main star, following the actress' popular performance in The Tiger Woman. Zorro's Black Whip was budgeted at $134,899 although the final negative cost was $145,251 (a $10,352, or 7.7%, overspend). It was the cheapest Republic serial of 1944. It was filmed between 29 July and 26 August 1944 under the working title The Black Whip. The serial's production number was 1495. Despite physically wrestling with her, the villains never realize that the very obviously female Black Whip is a woman. Footage from this serial was reused in Don Daredevil Rides Again and Man with the Steel Whip.

=== Stunts ===
- Babe DeFreest as The Black Whip (doubling Linda Stirling)
- Dale Van Sickel as Vic Gordon/Rock Heavy Karl/Camp Heavy/Danley (doubling George J. Lewis]
- Tom Steele as Baxter/Ed (doubling Hal Taliaferro)
- Helen Thurston
- Carey Loftin
- Cliff Lyons

=== Special effects ===
Special effects by Republic's in-house team of the Lydecker brothers.

== Release ==
=== Theatrical ===
Zorro's Black Whip's official release date is 16 November 1944, although this is actually the date the sixth chapter was made available to film exchanges. The serial was re-released on 8 July 1957 between the similar re-releases of The Purple Monster Strikes and Radar Men from the Moon. The last original Republic serial release was King of the Carnival in 1955.

== Chapter titles ==
183 minutes = 3h, 2m, 15s

1. The Masked Avenger (23min 23s)
2. Tomb of Terror (14min 27s)
3. Mob Murder (14min 24s)
4. Detour to Death (14min 24s)
5. Take Off That Mask! (14min 28s)
6. Fatal Gold (14min 27s)
7. Wolf Pack (14min 27s)
8. The Invisible Victim (14min 26s) – a re-cap chapter
9. Avalanche (14min 28s)
10. Fangs of Doom (14min 27s)
11. Flaming Juggernaut (14min 27s)
12. Trail of Tyranny (14min 27s)

_{Source:}

This was one of two 12-chapter serials released in 1944, along with Linda Stirling's serial debut, The Tiger Woman. It had been Republic's standard pattern to produce two 12-chapter serials and two 15-chapter serials each year since 1938 but 1944 was the last year that occurred. In fact, Republic would only produce two more 15-chapter serials, Manhunt of Mystery Island and The Purple Monster Strikes, both in 1945 and both starring Linda Stirling.

== See also ==
- Lady Robinhood
- List of film serials by year
- List of film serials by studio
- List of films in the public domain in the United States
- Queen of Swords (TV series)
- Senorita (film)
- The Bandit Queen (film)

Preceded by Haunted Harbor (1944)	Republic Serial; Zorro's Black Whip (1944)	Succeeded by Manhunt of Mystery Island (1945)
Preceded by Zorro's Fighting Legion (1939)	Zorro Serial; Zorro's Black Whip (1944)	Succeeded by Son of Zorro (1947)
