= Ronald Davidson =

American screenwriter (1899–1965)

Ronald Anstuther Davidson Sr. (July 13, 1899 – July 28, 1965) was an American screenwriter, story editor and associate producer.

== Biography ==
Born in Arizona and reared in Los Angeles, he was the son of Dr. Anstruther Davidson and author Alice Jane Merritt. He married his wife, Anita Merle (Collins) Davidson, in 1937.

Graduated from the University of California, Berkeley, where he was a member of Sigma Pi and Phi Beta Kappa fraternities, he began his career as a short story writer.

Davidson worked on some feature films for Republic Studios as well as several highly successful movie serials, and was appointed their movie serials Story Editor in 1943. He also wrote for TV, films and serials, and was associate producer on several productions. He was a member of the Screen Writers Guild.

Ronald Davidson Sr died on July 28, 1965, in San Diego, California, a few days past his 66th birthday.

== Screenwriter filmography ==
Movie serials

- The Painted Stallion (1937)
- S.O.S. Coast Guard (1937)
- Zorro Rides Again (1937)
- The Lone Ranger (1938)
- The Fighting Devil Dogs (1938)
- Dick Tracy Returns (1938)
- The Lone Ranger Rides Again (1939)
- Daredevils of the Red Circle (1939)
- Dick Tracy's G-Men (1939)
- Zorro's Fighting Legion (1939)
- Drums of Fu Manchu (1940)
- Adventures of Red Ryder (1940)
- Mysterious Doctor Satan (1940)
- Adventures of Captain Marvel (1941)
- Jungle Girl (1941)
- King of the Texas Rangers (1941)
- Dick Tracy vs Crime Inc (1941)
- Spy Smasher (1942)
- Perils of Nyoka (1942)
- King of the Mounties (1942)
- G-Men vs The Black Dragon (1943)
- Daredevils of the West (1943)
- Secret Service in Darkest Africa (1943)
- The Masked Marvel (1943)
- Captain America (1944)
- The Tiger Woman (1944)
- The Invisible Monster (1950)
- Desperadoes of the West (1950)
- Flying Disc Man from Mars (1950)
- Don Daredevil Rides Again (1951)
- Government Agents vs Phantom Legion (1951)
- Radar Men from the Moon (1952)
- Zombies of the Stratosphere (1952)
- Jungle Drums of Africa (1953)
- Canadian Mounties vs Atomic Invaders (1953)
- Trader Tom of the China Seas (1954)
- Man with the Steel Whip (1954)
- Panther Girl of the Kongo (1955)
- King of the Carnival (1955)

Feature films

- Hi-Yo Silver (1940)
- The Fighting Devil Dogs (1943) (Feature version of the 1938 serial)
- Range Renegades (1948)
- Triggerman (1948)
- Cowboy Cavalier (1948)
- The Fighting Ranger (1948)
- Courtin' Trouble (1948)
- Across the Rio Grande (1949)
- Range Justice (1949)
- Roaring Westward (1949)
- Black Hills Ambush (1952)
- Satan's Satellites (1958)
- Missile Monsters (1958)
- Zorro Rides Again (1959) (Feature version of the 1937 serial)

== Story writer (feature films) ==
- Daredevils of the Clouds (1948)
- The Young and The Brave (1963)

== TV series and films ==
- Commando Cody (1953 – TV series)
- The Adventures of Dr. Fu Manchu (1956 – TV series) (episode: The Vengeance of Fu Manchu)
- Torpedo of Doom (1966 – TV film version of Fighting Devil Dogs 1938 serial)
- Sakima and the Masked Marvel (1966 – TV film version of The Masked Marvel 1943 serial)
- Nyoka and the Lost Secrets of Hippocrates (1966 – TV film)
- Target: Sea of China (1966 – TV film)

== Associate producer filmography ==
- Haunted Harbor (1944)
- Zorro's Black Whip (1944)
- Manhunt of Mystery Island (1945)
- Federal Operator 99 (1945)
- The Purple Monster Strikes (1945)
- The Phantom Rider (1946)
- King of the Forest Rangers (1946)
- Daughter of Don Q (1946)
- The Crimson Ghost (1946)
- Son of Zorro (1947)
- D-Day on Mars (1966) (TV – producer)
