= Joseph F. Poland =

American screenwriter

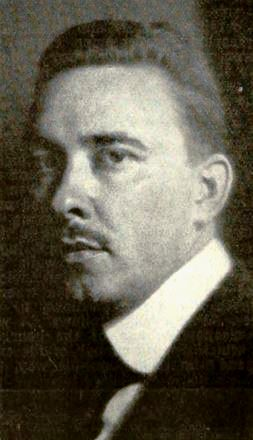
- Poland in 1919
- Born: September 4, 1892; Waterbury, Connecticut, USA
- Died: March 23, 1962 (aged 69); Los Angeles, California, USA
- Occupation: Screenwriter
- Years active: 1913–1954

Joseph Franklin Poland (September 4, 1892 – March 23, 1962) was an American screenwriter. He wrote for more than 130 films between 1913 and 1954. He was born in Waterbury, Connecticut and died in Los Angeles, California.

== Selected filmography ==
- Drawing the Line (1915)
- Patsy (1917)
- The Beautiful Adventure (1917)
- A Daughter of Maryland (1917)
- Wild Primrose (1918)
- Set Free (1918)
- The Spitfire of Seville (1919)
- Yvonne from Paris (1919)
- A Bachelor's Wife (1919)
- The Intrusion of Isabel (1919)
- The Triflers (1920)
- A Thousand to One (1920)
- Blind Hearts (1921)
- Princess Jones (1921)
- The Cup of Life (1921)
- Elope If You Must (1922)
- Madness of Youth (1923)
- Good-By Girls! (1923)
- Man's Size (1923)
- The Night Hawk (1924)
- The Half-Way Girl (1925)
- The Unguarded Hour (1925)
- Hold That Lion (1926)
- The Sophomore (1929)
- Overland with Kit Carson (1930)
- The Lawless Nineties (1936)
- Mysterious Doctor Satan (1940)
- Jungle Girl (1941)
- King of the Texas Rangers (1941)
- Dick Tracy vs. Crime, Inc. (1941)
- Spy Smasher (1942)
- Perils of Nyoka (1942)
- King of the Mounties (1942)
- G-Men vs the Black Dragon (1943)
- Daredevils of the West (1943)
- Secret Service in Darkest Africa (1943)
- Captain America (1944)
- The Tiger Woman (1944)
- Haunted Harbor (1944)
- Zorro's Black Whip (1944)
- Manhunt of Mystery Island (1945)
- Federal Operator 99 (1945)
- The Purple Monster Strikes (1945)
- Stage to Mesa City (1947)
- Black Hills (1947)
- Superman (1948)
- Bruce Gentry (1949)
- Batman and Robin (1949)
- Atom Man vs. Superman (1950)
- Captain Video: Master of the Stratosphere (1951)
- Fargo (1952)
