= King of the Texas Rangers =

1941 film by John English, William Witney

- Directed by: William Witney; John English
- Written by: Ronald Davidson; Norman S. Hall; William Lively; Joseph O'Donnell; Joseph Poland
- Produced by: Hiram S. Brown Jr.
- Starring: "Slingin' Sammy Baugh"; Neil Hamilton; Pauline Moore; Duncan Renaldo; Charles Trowbridge; Herbert Rawlinson; Frank Darien; Rudolph Anders
- Cinematography: Reggie Lanning
- Production company: Republic Pictures
- Distributed by: Republic Pictures
- Release date: October 4, 1941 (U.S. serial)
- Running time: 12 chapters (215 minutes) (serial); 6 26½-minute episodes (TV)
- Country: United States
- Language: English
- Budget: $138,536 (negative cost: $139,701)

King of the Texas Rangers is a 1941 American film serial produced by Republic Pictures. Set in the years prior to America entering World War II, the plot is slightly anachronistic in that the serial features a mix of period western and modern elements, which was familiar in the B-Western films also produced by Republic. Although the serial's plot involves cowboys battling Axis agents in Texas, Nazis are never named as such, but their presence is strongly implied within the serial. (Note: Republic liked calling their heroes "King" in order to use the title "King of..." The studio had found success with this naming scheme following the adaptation of Zane Grey's King of the Royal Mounted.)

== Plot ==
When Captain King of the Texas Rangers is murdered by saboteurs, his son, Tom, a famous football star, leaves college and joins the Texas Rangers himself. Shortly after, Tom is given the mission of avenging his father's death and defeating the foreign agents.

John Barton, supposedly a respectable citizen, works with "His Excellency", a mysterious leader of a gang of saboteurs, intent on destroying the Dobe Hills Oil Company oil fields in Texas. Tom teams up with Sally Crane, a reporter who witnessed his father's murder, and Mexican officer Lt. Pedro Garcia. The agents are working across the border in both countries with destroying the saboteurs' hideouts being their goal.

One of the targets of the gang of saboteurs is an invention by Professor Nelson who has developed a new type of aviation fuel. Tom protects the professor, riding aboard a train as his bodyguard. foiling the plot to kidnap the inventor. When rumours spread that the new aviation fuel is dangerous, Tom and Sally set out in an aircraft to prove the fuel is safe. When Pedro learns that Tom's aircraft is rigged with a time bomb, he warns him in time for Sally and Tom to parachute to safety.

The saboteurs plan to destroy the Whitney Dam would flood the oil fields in Texas, and when Sally finds one of their hideouts, Tom has to rescue her. Barton and his gang finally get their hands on the formula for the special aviation fuel and set out in a dirigible flown by "His Excellency". Their attack on the oil fields is thwarted when Tom and Pedro crash their aircraft into the dirigible, killing the gang. The two lawmen parachute to safety and are later honoured by the Texas Rangers for their bravery.

== Chapter titles ==
1. The Fifth Column Strikes (29min 11s)
2. Dead End (17min 42s)
3. Manhunt (16min 42s)
4. Trapped (17min 9s)
5. Test Flight (16min 40s)
6. Double Danger (16min 30s)
7. Death Takes the Witness (16min 43s)
8. Counterfeit Trail (16min 48s)
9. Ambush (16min 48s)
10. Sky Raiders (16min 51s)
11. Trail of Death (16min 40s)
12. Code of the Rangers (16min 47s)

_{Source:}

== Cast ==
- "Slingin' Sammy Baugh" as Ranger Tom King Jr.
- Neil Hamilton as John Barton/Felix Hauptman
- Pauline Moore as Sally Crane
- Duncan Renaldo as Lt Pedro Garcia
- Charles Trowbridge as Robert Crawford
- Herbert Rawlinson as Colonel Lee Avery
- Frank Darien as Pop Evans
- Rudolph Anders as His Excellency
- Jack Ingram as Shorty
- Joseph Forte as Professor Nelson

== Production ==
King of the Texas Rangers (production number 996) was budgeted at $138,536 although the final negative cost was $139,701 (a $1,165, or 0.8%, overspend). The serial was the cheapest Republic serial of 1941. King of the Texas Rangers was filmed in the Big Bear Valley, San Bernardino National Forest, California between June 17 and July 18, 1941.

Other actors were curious and skeptical about footballer Sammy Baugh as the lead in a sort of western. However, according to co-star Kenne Duncan, Baugh turned out to be a good horseman (he was raised on a ranch, in Texas), took direction well and learned about acting quickly.

In the opinions of researchers Jim Harmon and Donald F. Glut, King of the Texas Rangers contains "one of the greatest cliffhangers of all time." King (Baugh) jumps onto a speeding train and gets into the engine cab just as the train enters a tunnel in a mountain. The villains detonate explosives causing a landslide at the other end of the tunnel. In the resolution, Baugh yells: "Open that throttle!" and the train shoots out of the tunnel to safety.

== Reception ==
The official release date of King of the Texas Rangers is October 4, 1941, although this is actually the date the sixth chapter was made available to film exchanges. In the early 1950s, King of the Texas Rangers was one of 14 Republic serials edited into a television series broadcast in six, 26½-minute episodes.

King of the Texas Rangers was reviewed by Jesse Sublett in his retrospective analysis of the myth of the Texas Rangers, "Lone On The Range: Texas Lawmen: A history of the Texas Rangers". Sublett said: "A search of movie databases can quickly overwhelm the researcher with Ranger movies ...". King of the Texas Rangers is identified as the most important film on the mythology of the Rangers from the period 1926–1948.

== See also ==
- List of film serials by year
- List of film serials by studio

Preceded by Jungle Girl (1941)	Republic Serial; King of the Texas Rangers (1941)	Succeeded by Dick Tracy vs. Crime, Inc. (1941)
Preceded by Jungle Girl (1941)	Witney-English Serial; King of the Texas Rangers (1941)	Succeeded by Dick Tracy vs. Crime, Inc. (1941)
