= Don Daredevil Rides Again =

1951 film by Fred C. Brannon

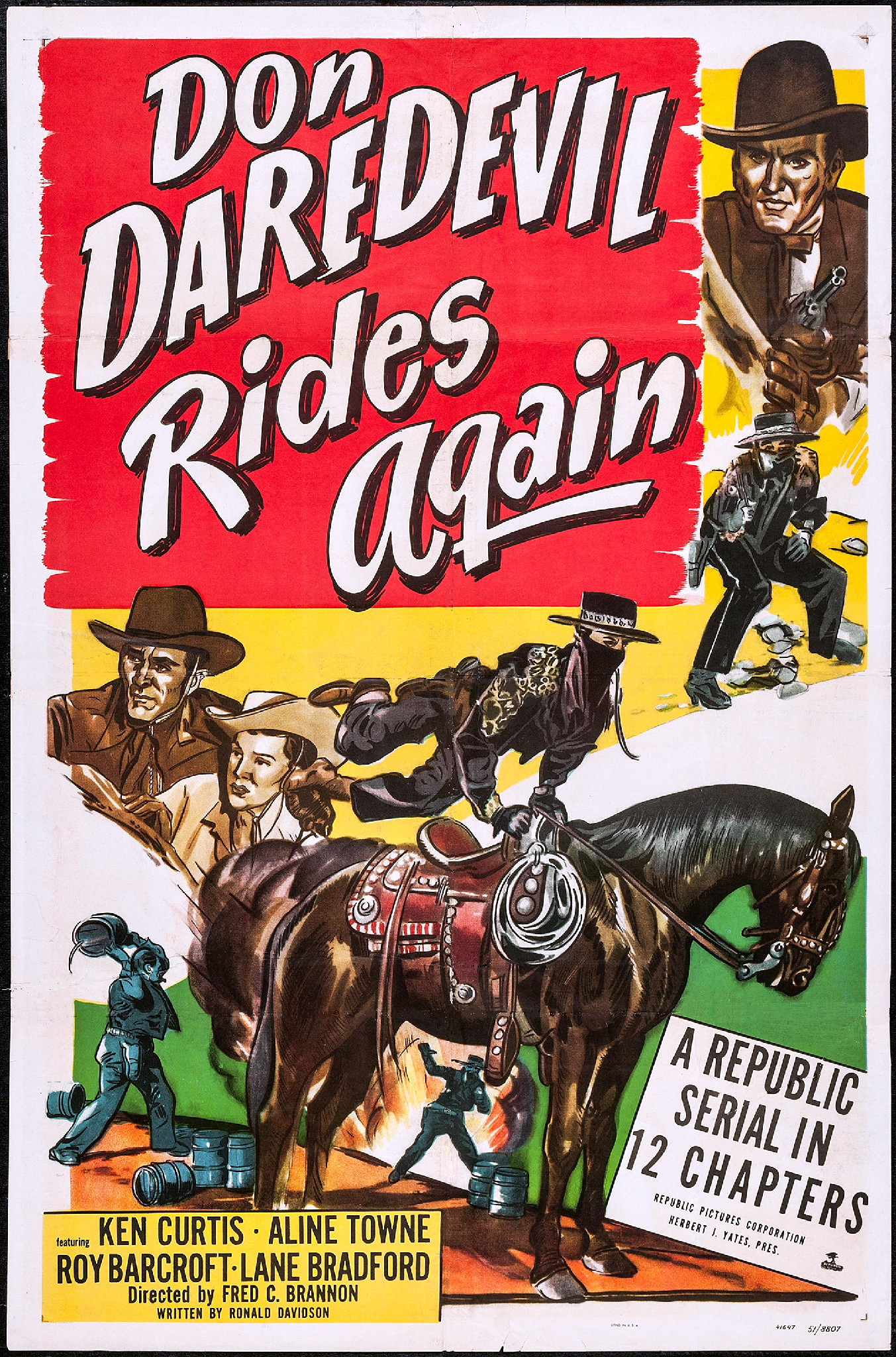
- Directed by: Fred C. Brannon
- Written by: Ronald Davidson
- Produced by: Franklin Adreon
- Starring: Ken Curtis; Aline Towne; Roy Barcroft; Lane Bradford; Robert Einer; John Cason
- Cinematography: Ellis W. Carter
- Music by: Stanley Wilson
- Distributed by: Republic Pictures
- Release date: April 11, 1951 (U.S.)
- Running time: 12 chapters / 167 minutes
- Country: United States
- Language: English
- Budget: $153,080 (negative cost: $155,200)

Don Daredevil Rides Again (1951) is a Republic Movie serial. It makes heavy use of stock footage from Republic's previous Zorro serials. The character of Don Daredevil (Ken Curtis) was created for this serial as the rights to Zorro belonged to Disney by 1951.

== Plot ==
A vile political boss named Stratton (Roy Barcroft) hires a gang of night riders to scare off the local landowners so he can claim their lands for himself. Patricia Doyle (Aline Towne) fights back to keep her property from being stolen from her, with the aid of her cousin Lee Hadley (Ken Curtis) and her neighbor Gary Taylor. Lee realizes that help is not forthcoming from the government, so he disguises himself as a masked Zorro-like figure called Don Daredevil, and battles the land grabbers in much the same way his grandfather used to do many years ago, as the original Don Daredevil. Lee decimates the gang over the course of the 12 episodes, and finally fights Stratton one-on-one inside a burning farmhouse in the finale of the film.

== Cast ==
- Ken Curtis as Lee Hadley, otherwise known as "Don Daredevil"
- Aline Towne as Patricia Doyle
- Roy Barcroft as Douglas Stratton
- Lane Bradford as Webber
- Robert Einer as Gary Taylor
- John Cason as Hagen
- I. Stanford Jolley as the sheriff
- Guy Teague
- Tom Steele
- Sandy Sanders
- Michael Ragan
- Cactus Mack
- Lee Phelps
- Hank Patterson

== Production ==
Don Daredevil Rides Again was budgeted at $153,080 although the final negative cost was $155,200 (a $2,120, or 1.4%, overspend). It was the most expensive Republic serial of 1951.

It was filmed between 5 February and 27 February 1951. The serial's production number was 1930.

Don Daredevil Rides Again used stock footage taken from the earlier serial Zorro's Black Whip.

=== Stunts ===
- Tom Steele as Lee Hadley/Don Daredevil/Henchman Black (doubling Ken Curtis)
- Eddie Parker as Douglas Stratton (doubling Roy Barcroft)
- Dale Van Sickel as Gary Taylor/Dan Farley (doubling Robert Einer)
- Carey Loftin as Hagen/Henchman Owens (doubling John Cason)

=== Special effects ===
Special effects by the Lydecker brothers

== Release ==
=== Theatrical ===
Don Daredevil Rides Again's official release date is 11 April 1951, although this is actually the date the sixth chapter was made available to film exchanges.

== Critical reception ==
Cline describes this serial as just a "quickie."

== Chapter titles ==
1. Return of the Don (20min)
2. Double Death (13min 20s)
3. Hidden Danger (13min 20s)
4. Retreat to Destruction (13min 20s)
5. Cold Steel (13min 20s)
6. The Flaming Juggernaut (13min 20s)
7. Claim Jumper (13min 20s)
8. Perilous Combat (13min 20s)
9. Hostage of Destiny (13min 20s)
10. Marked for Murder (13min 20s) - a re-cap chapter
11. The Captive Witness (13min 20s)
12. Flames of Vengeance (13min 20s)

_{Source:}

== See also ==
- List of film serials by year
- List of film serials by studio
- The Republic Zorro serials:
  - Zorro Rides Again (1937)
  - Zorro's Fighting Legion (1939)
  - Zorro's Black Whip (1944)
  - Ghost of Zorro (1949)

Preceded by Flying Disc Man from Mars (1950)	Republic Serial; Don Daredevil Rides Again (1951)	Succeeded by Government Agents vs Phantom Legion (1951)
