= Trader Tom of the China Seas =

1954 film by Franklin Adreon

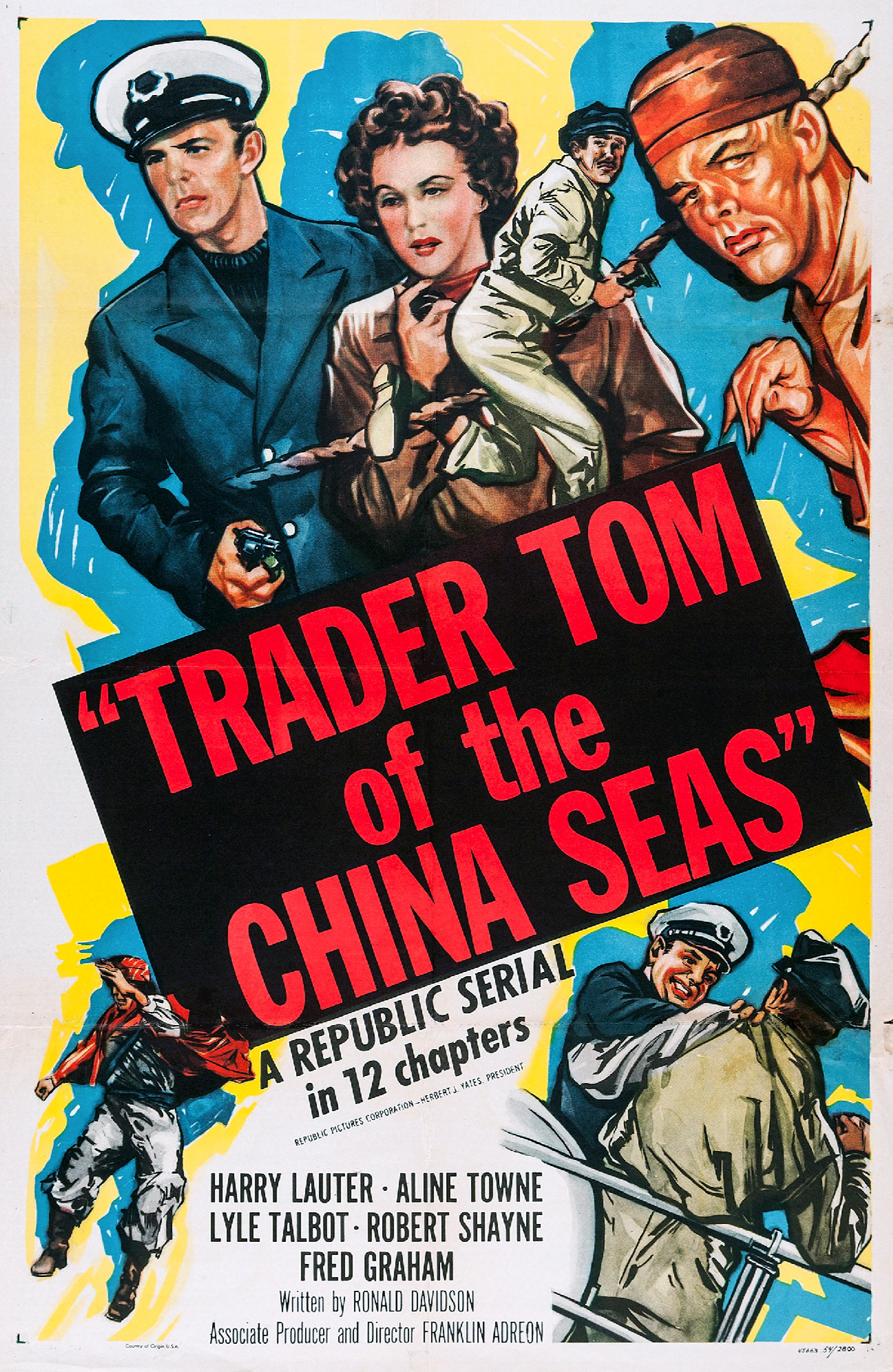
- Directed by: Franklin Adreon
- Written by: Ronald Davidson
- Produced by: Franklin Adreon
- Starring: Harry Lauter; Aline Towne; Lyle Talbot; Robert Shayne; Fred Graham; Richard Reeves; John Crawford; George Selk
- Cinematography: Bud Thackery
- Distributed by: Republic Pictures
- Release dates: January 6, 1954 (U.S. serial); 1966 (U.S. TV)
- Running time: 12 chapters (167 minutes (serial); 100 minutes (TV)
- Language: English
- Budget: $172,789 (negative cost: $169,248)

Trader Tom of the China Seas is a 1954 Republic film serial directed by Franklin Adreon and starring Harry Lauter, Aline Towne, Lyle Talbot, Robert Shayne, Fred Graham, and Richard Reeves. In 1966 the serial was edited into Century 66 100-minute television film with the new title Target: Sea of China.

== Plot ==
The United Nations has island trader Tom Rogers and Vivian Wells, daughter of a schooner captain, spearheading the effort to keep subversive native groups from starting revolutions in Burmatra and neighboring Asian countries.

== Cast ==
- Harry Lauter as Tom Rogers
- Aline Towne as Vivian Wells
- Lyle Talbot as Barent
- Robert Shayne as Major Conroy
- Fred Graham as Kurt Daley
- Richard Reeves as Rebel Chief
- John Crawford as Bill Gaines
- George Selk as Ole

== Production ==
Trader Tom of the China Seas was budgeted at $172,789 although the final negative cost was $169,248 (a $3,541, or 2%, under spend). It was the cheapest Republic serial of 1954. It was filmed between 8 September and 28 September 1953. The serial's production number was 1937.

=== Stunts ===
- Dale Van Sickel as Tom Rogers/Rebel Assassin in Jeep (doubling Harry Lauter)
- Tom Steele as Gursan
- Fred Graham
- Bert LeBaron as Railroad Fireman
- Ken Terrell as Crewman

=== Special Effects ===
Special effects were created by the Lydecker brothers.

== Release ==
=== Theatrical ===
Trader Tom of the China Seas's official release date is 11 January 1954, although this is actually the date the sixth chapter was made available to film exchanges. This was followed by a re-release of Secret Service in Darkest Africa, re-titled as Manhunt in the African Jungles, instead of a new serial. The next new serial, Man with the Steel Whip, followed in the summer.

=== Television ===
Trader Tom of the China Seas was one of twenty-six Republic serials re-released as a Century 66 film on television in 1966. The title of the film was changed to Target: Sea of China. This version was cut down to 100-minutes in length.

== Critical reception ==
Cline describes this serial as just a "quickie."

== Chapter titles ==
1. Sea Saboteurs (20min)
2. Death Takes the Deck (13min 20s)
3. Five Fathoms Down (13min 20s)
4. On Target (13min 20s)
5. The Fire Ship (13min 20s)
6. Collision (13min 20s)
7. War in the Hills (13min 20s)
8. Native Execution (13min 20s)
9. Mass Attack (13min 20s)
10. Machine Murder (13min 20s) - a re-cap chapter
11. Underwater Ambush (13min 20s)
12. Twisted Vengeance (13min 20s)

_{Source:}

== See also ==
- List of film serials
- List of film serials by studio
