= S.O.S. Coast Guard =

S O S Coast Guard
- Directed by: Alan James; William Witney
- Written by: Franklin Adreon; Morgan Cox; Ronald Davidson; Edward Lynn; Winston Miller; Lester Scott; Barry Shipman
- Produced by: Sol C. Siegel
- Starring: Ralph Byrd; Bela Lugosi; Maxine Doyle; Richard Alexander; Lee Ford; Herbert Rawlinson; John Picorri
- Cinematography: William Nobles
- Edited by: Helene Turner; Edward Todd
- Music by: Raoul Kraushaar
- Distributed by: Republic Pictures
- Release dates: August 28, 1937 (U.S. serial); April 16, 1942 (U.S. feature)
- Running time: 12 chapters (224 minutes) (serial); 71 minutes (feature)
- Country: United States
- Language: English
- Budget: $107,217 (negative cost: $128,530)

S O S Coast Guard is a 1937 Republic film serial. It was the seventh of the sixty-six serials made by Republic. The plot concerns the mad scientist Boroff (Bela Lugosi) attempting to sell a superweapon to the highest bidder, opposed by Coast Guard Lieutenant Terry Kent (Ralph Byrd), for both personal and professional reasons.

The main stars were Bela Lugosi and Ralph Byrd. It was made during the 2-year period when the Hayes Office put a moratorium on horror movies, Lugosi's usual genre, and in the midst of Byrd's notoriety for the highly popular Dick Tracy serials.

== Plot ==
Boroff is a mad scientist who has invented a "disintegrator gas" and plans to smuggle it to his buyers in Morovania. When his ship, the Carfax, gets stranded on outlying rocks in the first chapter, the Coast Guard comes to rescue him. Recognized by the reporters, Jean and Snapper, Boroff runs and kills the pursuing Coast Guard Ensign Jim Kent, who turns to be Lt. Terry Kent's brother.

As the gas is made from the rare substances Arnatite (which is radioactive) and Zanzoid, Boroff attempts to acquire more of these materials to create more (including salvaging supplies of arnatite from the sunken Carfax). Hot on his heels are the Coast Guard, led by Lt. Kent, and the two reporters, with the expert aid of Jean's chemist brother, Dick.

Eventually Terry finds, and leads a squad against, Boroff's cave-based hideout, with disintegrator gas bombs exploding around them.

== Cast ==
=== Main cast ===
- Ralph Byrd as Terry Kent, Coast guard lieutenant
- Bela Lugosi as Boroff, mad scientist. The name is similar to, and possibly based on, that of Bela Lugosi's rival, Boris Karloff.
- Maxine Doyle as Jean Norman, reporter. Maxine later married the director William Witney after meeting him for the first time during production of this serial.
- Richard Alexander as Thorg, mute, lobotomised servant of Boroff
- Lee Ford as Snapper McGree, reporter

=== Supporting cast ===
- Herbert Rawlinson as Boyle, Coast guard commander
- John Picorri as G. A. Rackerby, scientist-henchman working for Boroff
- Lawrence Grant as Rabinisi, Boroff's henchman
- Thomas Carr as Jim Kent, Terry's brother and a Coast guard ensign
- Carleton Young as Dodds, Boroff's henchman
- Allen Connor as Dick Norman, Jean's brother and chemist
- George Chesebro as L.H. DeGado, Boroff's henchman
- Ranny Weeks as Wies, Boroff's henchman

== Production ==
S O S Coast Guard was budgeted at $107,217 although the final negative cost was $128,530 (a $21,313, or 19.9%, overspend). It was the most expensive Republic serial of 1937 and the most expensive of all Republic serials until the release of The Lone Ranger in 1938. It was filmed between 10 June and 15 July 1937. The serial's production number was 422.

Director William Witney met his first wife, Maxine Doyle, while working on this serial.

=== Stunts ===
- Earle D. Bunn
- Yakima Canutt
- Loren Riebe
- Duke Taylor

=== Special effects ===
The serial's special effects were created by Jack Coyle and the Lydecker brothers.

== Release ==
=== Theatrical ===
SOS Coast Guard's official release date is 28 August 1937, although this is actually the date the sixth chapter was made available to film exchanges.

A 71-minute feature film version, created by editing the serial footage together with some additional scenes shot during the serial's production, including a new shot featuring Bela Lugosi, was released on 16 April 1942. The new scenes involved a substantial plot alteration to feature a made-up chemical, called arnatite, as a deadly explosive in and of itself, and other dialogue to cover continuity gaps arising from the editing.

== Chapter titles ==
1. Disaster at Sea (30 min 3s)
2. Barrage of Death (19 min 46s)
3. The Gas Chamber (18 min 40s)
4. The Fatal Shaft (19 min 35s)
5. The Mystery Ship (18 min 31s)
6. Deadly Cargo (18 min 4s)
7. Undersea Terror (15 min 46s)
8. The Crash! (16 min 34s)
9. Wolves at Bay (15 min 56s)
10. The Acid Trail (16 min 58s)
11. The Sea Battle (17 min 12s)
12. The Deadly Circle (17 min 3s)

_{Source:}

== Cliffhangers ==
1. Disaster at Sea: Terry and Thorg fight on a Tramp steamer as it sinks.
2. Barrage of Death: Terry is tied up aboard a boat as the Coast guard open fire unawares.
3. The Gas Chamber: Terry and Snapper are trapped in a glass cabinet as the Disintegration Gas melts the room.
4. The Fatal Shaft: A freight elevator crashes down onto Terry.
5. The Mystery Ship: Whilst attempting to shut them down, Terry is caught in a boiler explosion.
6. Deadly Cargo: A water tower, weakened by the Disintegration Gas, collapses on Terry.
7. Undersea Terror: While fighting underwater, Thorg cuts through Terry's air line.
8. The Crash!: The car carrying Terry, Jean and Snapper plunges down a steep slope after Boroff's henchmen shoot out a tyre.
9. Wolves at Bay: Terry, Jean and Snapper are caught inside an exploding warehouse.
10. The Acid Trail: When Terry attempts to rescue Dick Norman from a burning truck, the brake line melts and it plunges over a cliff into the sea.
11. The Sea Battle: Terry is caught by Thorg and pulled into the water to drown.
