= Haunted Harbor =

1944 film by Wallace Grissell, Spencer Gordon Bennet

- Directed by: Spencer Gordon Bennet; Wallace Grissell
- Written by: Royal Cole; Basil Dickey; Jesse Duffy; Grant Nelson; Joseph Poland; Ewart Adamson (novel)
- Produced by: Ronald Davidson
- Starring: Kane Richmond; Kay Aldridge; Roy Barcroft; Clancy Cooper; Marshall J. Reed; Oscar O'Shea
- Cinematography: Bud Thackery
- Distributed by: Republic Pictures
- Release dates: August 26, 1944 (U.S. serial); September 26, 1951 (re-release)
- Running time: 15 chapters / 243 minutes (serial)
- Country: United States
- Language: English
- Budget: $170,099 (negative cost: $207,856)

Haunted Harbor (1944) is a Republic serial, based on the novel by Ewart Adamson.

== Plot ==
Sea captain Jim Marsden is about to be hanged for a murder he didn't commit, and is rescued from the gallows by two of his crewmen. To clear the captain's name, they head for the island of Pulinan, where they believe the real murderer is hiding. During the search for the killer, one thing leads to another and Jim and the crew soon find that their troubles have just started. Investigating a possible hiding place of the killer, Jim encounters huge sea monsters in Haunted Harbor.

== Cast ==
- Kane Richmond as Jim Marsden
- Kay Aldridge as Patricia Harding
- Roy Barcroft as Carter (AKA Kane)
- Clancy Cooper as Yank
- Marshall J. Reed as Tommy
- Oscar O'Shea as John Galbraith
- Forrest Taylor as Dr Oliver Harding
- Hal Taliaferro as Lawson

== Production ==
Haunted Harbor was based on a novel by Ewart Adamson (writing as Dayle Douglas).

The serial was budgeted at $170,099 although the final negative cost was $207,856 (a $37,757, or 22.2%, overspend).

It was filmed between 14 April and 18 May 1944. The serial's production number was 1395.

No other Jungle serial was released by Republic for nine years after Haunted Harbor, when 1953's Jungle Drums of Africa was released.

This was the last serial adaptation made by Republic.

This was writer Ronald Davidson's first time as a film producer. His first writing credit is the 1937 Republic serial The Painted Stallion.

== Release ==
=== Theatrical ===
Haunted Harbor's official release date is 26 August 1944, although this is actually the date the seventh chapter was made available to film exchanges.

The serial was re-released on 26 September 1951, under the new title Pirates' Harbor, between the first runs of Government Agents vs. Phantom Legion and Radar Men from the Moon. It began a pattern of re-releasing an old serial between every new release, which lasted until Republic's last new serial was released in 1955. Three years of purely re-releases then followed.

== Critical reception ==
Cline writes that this "jungle-horror-mystery-sea-story" includes all of the "cliffhanging tricks Republic could muster."

== Chapter titles ==
1. Wanted for Murder (25min 1s)
2. Flight to Danger (15min 33s)
3. Ladder of Death (15min 33s)
4. The Unknown Assassin (15min 33s)
5. Harbor of Horror (15min 33s)
6. Return of the Fugitive (15min 32s)
7. Journey into Peril (15min 34s)
8. Wings of Doom (15min 33s)
9. Death's Door (15min 33s)
10. Crimson Sacrifice (15min 33s)
11. Jungle Jeopardy (15min 33s)
12. Fire Trap (15min 34s)
13. Monsters of the Deep (15min 34s)
14. High Voltage (15min 34s)
15. Crucible of Justice (15min 33s)

_{Source:}

== See also ==
- List of film serials by year
- List of film serials by studio
- List of American films of 1944

Preceded by The Tiger Woman (1944)	Republic Serial; Haunted Harbor (1944)	Succeeded by Zorro's Black Whip (1944)
