= King of the Mounties =

1942 film by William Witney

- Directed by: William Witney
- Written by: Taylor Caven; Ronald Davidson; William Lively; Joseph O'Donnell; Joseph Poland
- Based on: Character created by: Stephen Slesinger; Romer Grey
- Produced by: William J. O'Sullivan
- Starring: Allan Lane; Gilbert Emery; Russell Hicks; Peggy Drake; George Irving; Abner Biberman; William Vaughn; Nestor Paiva; Bradley Page
- Cinematography: Bud Thackery
- Distributed by: Republic Pictures
- Release date: October 17, 1942
- Running time: 12 chapters (196 minutes)
- Country: United States
- Language: English
- Budget: $136,320 (negative cost: $139,422)

King of the Mounties is a 1942 Republic 12-chapter film serial, directed by William Witney. Allan Lane played Sgt. Dave King of the Mounties, with Peggy Drake as heroine Carol Brent, and Abner Biberman played the villainous Japanese admiral Yamata.

== Plot ==
Canada is being bombed mercilessly by a mysterious plane, which is shaped like a boomerang, and is dubbed the Falcon. The plane is under the command of Japanese admiral Yamata. The identity of the plane remains a mystery until Professor Marshall Brent and his daughter Carol arrive with a new type of airplane detector. The Axis forces are planning a Canadian invasion, and feeling that Professor Brent poses a threat to their plan, they kidnap him. RCMP Sergeant Dave King attempts a rescue, but the professor is killed when the plane in which he is held captive crashes into a riverboat.

Carol Brent, determined to carry on her father's work, manages with Sergeant King's help to prevent the Axis spies from capturing the device her father invented. When the spy ring makes a last desperate attempt to capture the device from the cabin in which she is hiding out, she destroys it rather than let it fall into enemy hands. She is kidnapped and taken to a volcanic crater, where the spy ring has its headquarters. Rescuing her is up to King.

== Cast ==
- Allan Lane as Sgt Dave King
- Gilbert Emery as Commissioner Morrison
- Russell Hicks as Marshal Carleton
- Peggy Drake as Carol Brent
- George Irving as Prof Marshall Brent
- Abner Biberman as Admiral Yamata
- William Vaughn as Marshal Von Horst
- Nestor Paiva as Count Baroni
- Bradley Page as Charles Blake
- Anthony Warde as Stark
- Forrest Taylor as Telegrapher

== Production ==
King of the Mounties was budgeted at $136,320 although the final negative cost was $139,422 (a $3,102, or 2.3%, overspend). It was the cheapest Republic serial of 1942.

It was filmed between June 23 and July 17, 1942 under several working titles: King of the Royal Mounted Rides Again, King of the Royal Mounted Strikes Again, King of the Royal Mounted Strikes Back and King of the Northwest Mounted Strikes Again. The serial's production number was 1195.

Republic liked calling their heroes "King" in order to use the title "King of..." The studio had found success with this naming scheme following the adaptation of Zane Grey's King of the Royal Mounted.

The first reel of Chapter 3 was considered lost. However, the serial was recently restored by SerialSquadron.com, with added sound as well as subtitles in the spots where the soundtrack was missing. The restored serial has now been made available on DVD by Serial Squadron.

== Release ==
=== Theatrical ===
King of the Mounties' official release date is 17 October 1942, although this is actually the date the sixth chapter was made available to film exchanges.

== Chapter titles ==
1. Phantom Invaders (24min 10s)
2. Road to Death (15min 33s)
3. Human Target (15min 42s)
4. Railroad Saboteurs (15min 36s)
5. Suicide Dive (15min 34s)
6. Blazing Barrier (15min 33s)
7. Perilous Plunge (15min 34s)
8. Electrocuted (15min 40s)
9. Reign of Terror (15min 32s)
10. The Flying Coffin (15min 35s)
11. Deliberate Murder (15min 32s)
12. On to Victory (15min 32s)

_{Source:}
