= Bud Thackery =

American cinematographer

- Born: January 31, 1903; Shawnee, Oklahoma, United States
- Died: July 15, 1990 (aged 87); Los Angeles, California, United States
- Occupation: Cinematographer
- Years active: 1941–1977

Ellis J. "Bud" Thackery (January 31, 1903 – July 15, 1990) was an American cinematographer who spent the bulk of his film career at Republic Pictures before successfully transitioning to television. His first credit as a director of photography came in 1941, on the film The Gay Vagabond, and he worked steadily from that point well into the 1970s, chalking up an extensive filmography in both features and television.

Thackery took part in two episodes of The Virginian, many episodes of ABC series "McHale's Navy" and many episodes of the Ironside TV series on NBC. He was nominated for an Oscar along with Howard Lydecker, William Bradford and Herbert Norsch in 1941 for Best Effects, Special Effects in the film Women in War.

Working extensively in Republic's prolific series of B-Westerns and serials early in his career, he was a regular at the Iverson Movie Ranch in Chatsworth, Calif., recognized as the most widely filmed outdoor shooting location in movie and television history. In later years, he reportedly lived in a mobile home park that was built on the property of the former Iverson Movie Ranch.

== Selected filmography ==
- Outlaws of Pine Ridge (1942)
- The Girl from Alaska (1942)
- Sons of the Pioneers (1942)
- Haunted Harbor (1944)
- Sheriff of Sundown (1944)
- Oregon Trail (1945)
- The Phantom Rider (1946)
- The Crimson Ghost (1946)
- Son of Zorro (1947)
- Savage Frontier (1953)
- Phantom Stallion (1954)
- The Twinkle in God's Eye (1955)
- No Man's Woman (1955)
- Flame of the Islands (1956)
- Stranger at My Door (1956)
- Terror at Midnight (1956)
- The Man is Armed (1956)
- Beau Geste (1966)
- Coogan's Bluff (film) (1968)
- Strategy of Terror (1969)
