= Blackhawk (serial) =

1952 film by Spencer Gordon Bennet, Fred F. Sears

- Theatrical release insert poster
- Directed by: Spencer Gordon Bennet (as Spencer Bennet); Fred F. Sears
- Written by: George H. Plympton; Royal K. Cole; Sherman L. Lowe
- Based on: Blackhawk by: Chuck Cuidera; Bob Powell; Will Eisner
- Produced by: Sam Katzman
- Starring: Kirk Alyn; Carol Forman; John Crawford
- Cinematography: William Whitley
- Edited by: Earl Turner
- Music by: Mischa Bakaleinikoff
- Color process: Black and white
- Production company: Sam Katzman Productions
- Distributed by: Columbia Pictures
- Release date: July 24, 1952
- Running time: 242 minutes (15 episodes)
- Country: United States
- Language: English

Blackhawk is a 1952 American 15-chapter superhero movie serial from Columbia Pictures, based on the comic book Blackhawk, first published by Quality Comics, but later owned by competitor DC Comics. It was Columbia's forty-ninth serial. The one-sheet poster referred to the serial as The Miraculous Blackhawk: Freedom's Champion. The home video release added the tagline: "Fearless Champion of Freedom". The actual on-screen title is Blackhawk: Fearless Champion of Freedom.

Blackhawk stars Kirk Alyn as Blackhawk and Carol Forman as the foreign spy that must be stopped from stealing the experimental super-fuel "Element-X"; Alyn and Forman were also the hero and villain of Columbia's earlier Superman.

Blackhawk was produced by the famously cheap Sam Katzman and directed by the team of Spencer Gordon Bennet and Fred F. Sears. It is considered cheap and lackluster, made in the waning years of studio movie serial production.

== Premise ==
A flying squadron of World War II veterans, The International Brotherhood, is a private flying investigative force led by Blackhawk. They uncover a gang of underworld henchmen, led by the notorious foreign spy Laska, who reports to The Leader, a mysterious man. During the serial, Blackhawk and his flying squadron set about bringing these criminals to justice, following a series of cliff-hanger adventures.

== Cast ==
- Kirk Alyn as Blackhawk
- Michael Fox as Mr. Case
- Don C. Harvey as Olaf (as Don Harvey)
- Rick Vallin as Stan/Boris
- John Crawford as Chuck
- Frank Ellis as Hendrickson [Chs. 1–2,4,8-9]
- Larry Stewart as Andre
- Weaver Levy as Chop-Chop
- Carol Forman as Laska
- Zon Murray as Bork
- Nick Stuart as Cress
- Marshall Reed as Aller
- Pierce Lyden as Dyke
- William Fawcett as Dr. Rolph [Chs.4-7]
- Rory Mallinson as Hodge [Chs. 11-14]

== Chapter titles ==
1. Distress Call from Space
2. Blackhawk Traps a Traitor
3. In the Enemy's Hideout
4. The Iron Monster
5. Human Targets
6. Blackhawk's Leap for Life
7. Mystery Fuel
8. Blasted from the Sky
9. Blackhawk Tempts Fate
10. Chase for Element X
11. Forced Down
12. Drums of Doom
13. Blackhawk's Daring Plan
14. Blackhawk's Wild Ride
15. The Leader Unmasked

== Production ==
Writer George Plympton described a production staff meeting where they listened to a recording of the short-lived Blackhawk radio series. Everyone at the meeting was terrified by the confusing babble of accents. For Columbia's serial, all recruits of the Blackhawk squadron speak with standard American accents.

=== Stunts ===
In chapter 3, Kirk Alyn performs a potentially dangerous stunt without the use of a stunt double. To save the life of squadron member Stan, who's tied to a stake in the path of a taxiing plane, Blackhawk (Alyn) runs up to the vehicle and turns it aside by grabbing the wing. A hidden pilot inside the plane steered it to simulate the movement. When writing this scene, the screenwriters were thinking of a small lighter wood-and-canvas plane, not the heavy metal aircraft used in the final scene; it could have easily killed Alyn if the stunt's timing had gone wrong.

== Home media ==
The serial was released on VHS in 1997 by Columbia TriStar Home Video. In 2016, it was released on DVD by Mill Creek Entertainment under license from Sony Pictures Home Entertainment.

== Critical reception ==
William C. Cline describes the serial as a "pretty good airplane adventure" in his book In the Nick of Time. Despite this, Blackhawk was the last aviation serial; aviation had rapidly become less impressive in American popular culture, and science fiction was taking its place.

Made during the 1950s, Blackhawk was produced after the movie serial's heyday; many from this period were generally inferior to those made in the previous decade.
