= Atom Man vs. Superman =

1950 theatrical serial by Spencer Gordon Bennet

- Promotional poster
- Directed by: Spencer Gordon Bennet
- Written by: David Mathews; George H. Plympton; Joseph F. Poland
- Based on: Characters by Jerry Siegel; Joe Shuster
- Produced by: Sam Katzman
- Starring: Kirk Alyn; Lyle Talbot; Noel Neill; Tommy Bond
- Cinematography: Ira H. Morgan
- Edited by: Earl C. Turner
- Music by: Mischa Bakaleinikoff
- Color process: Black and white
- Distributed by: Columbia Pictures
- Release date: July 20, 1950 (United States)
- Running time: 15 chapters (252 minutes)
- Language: English

Atom Man vs. Superman is a 1950 American film serial and the second Superman movie serial featuring Kirk Alyn, credited (as with the previous serial) only by his character name, Superman.

When Luthor blackmails the city of Metropolis by threatening to destroy the entire community, Perry White, editor of the Daily Planet assigns Lois Lane, Jimmy Olsen and Clark Kent to cover the story. The first chapter was released in July 1950.

== Plot ==
Luthor, the Atom Man, invents several deadly devices to plague the city, including a disintegrating machine which can reduce people to their basic atoms and reassemble them in another place. Superman manages to thwart each scheme. Since Kryptonite can rob Superman of his powers, Luthor decides to create a synthetic Kryptonite and putters about obtaining the necessary ingredients: plutonium, radium, and the undefined 'etc.' Luthor places the Kryptonite at the launch of a ship, with Superman in attendance. He is exposed to the Kryptonite and passes out. Superman is taken off in an ambulance driven by Luthor's henchmen, and he is now under the control of Luthor. Superman is placed in a device, a lever is pulled, and the Man of Steel vanishes into "The Empty Doom".

== Cast ==
- Kirk Alyn as Kal-El / Clark Kent / Superman
- Noel Neill as Lois Lane
- Lyle Talbot as Luthor / Atom Man. The portrayal predated the character having the first name Lex.
- Tommy Bond as Jimmy Olsen
- Pierre Watkin as Perry White
- Jack Ingram as Foster
- Don C. Harvey as Albor
- Rusty Wescoatt as Carl
- Terry Frost as Baer
- Wally West as Dorr
- Paul Stader as "Killer" Lawson
- George Robotham as Earl

Noel Neill would return to the role of Lois Lane in 1953, replacing Phyllis Coates in the second through sixth (and final) seasons of The Adventures of Superman, and would be the model for Metropolis, Illinois's 2010 Lois Lane statue.

== Production ==
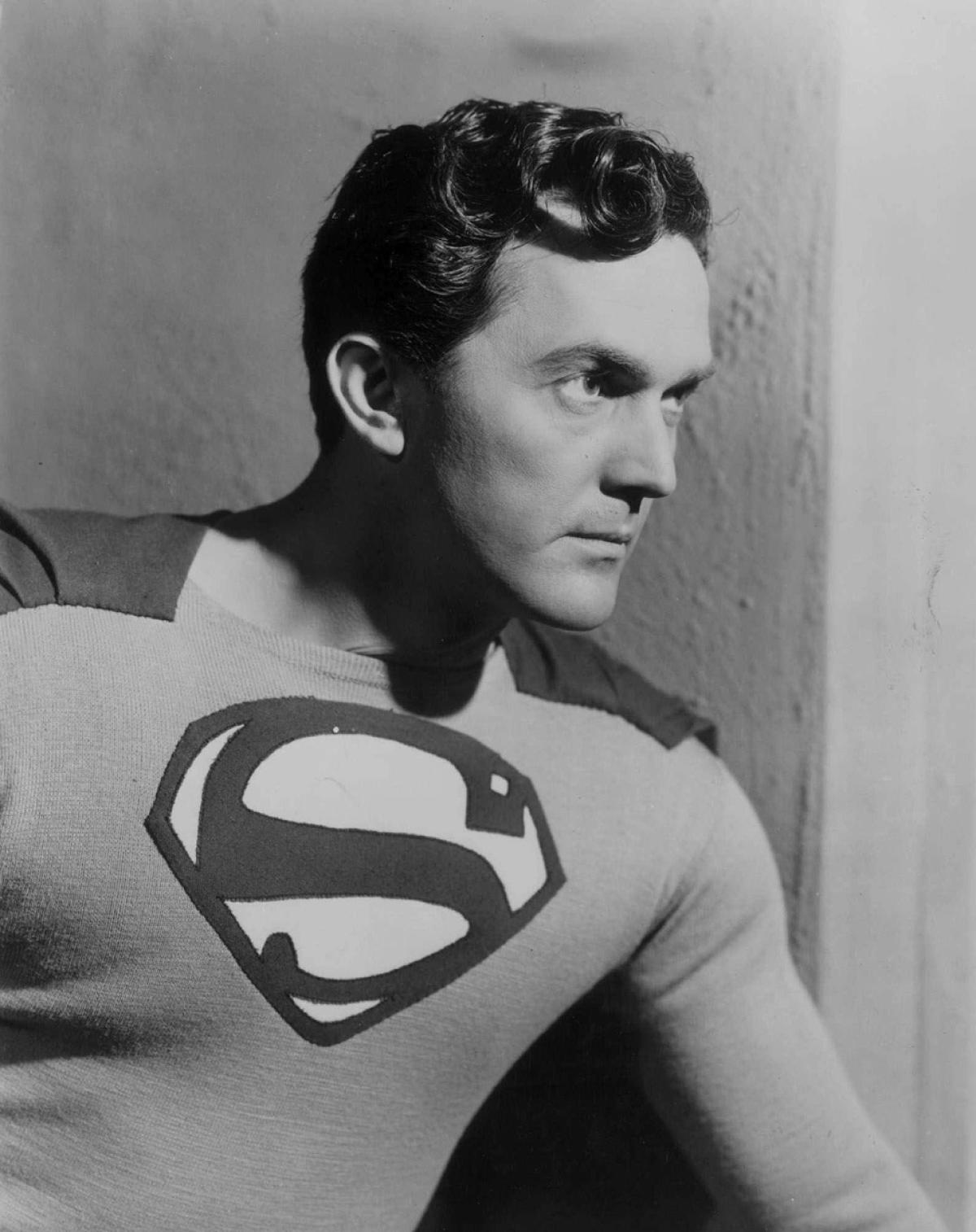
Kirk Alyn as Superman

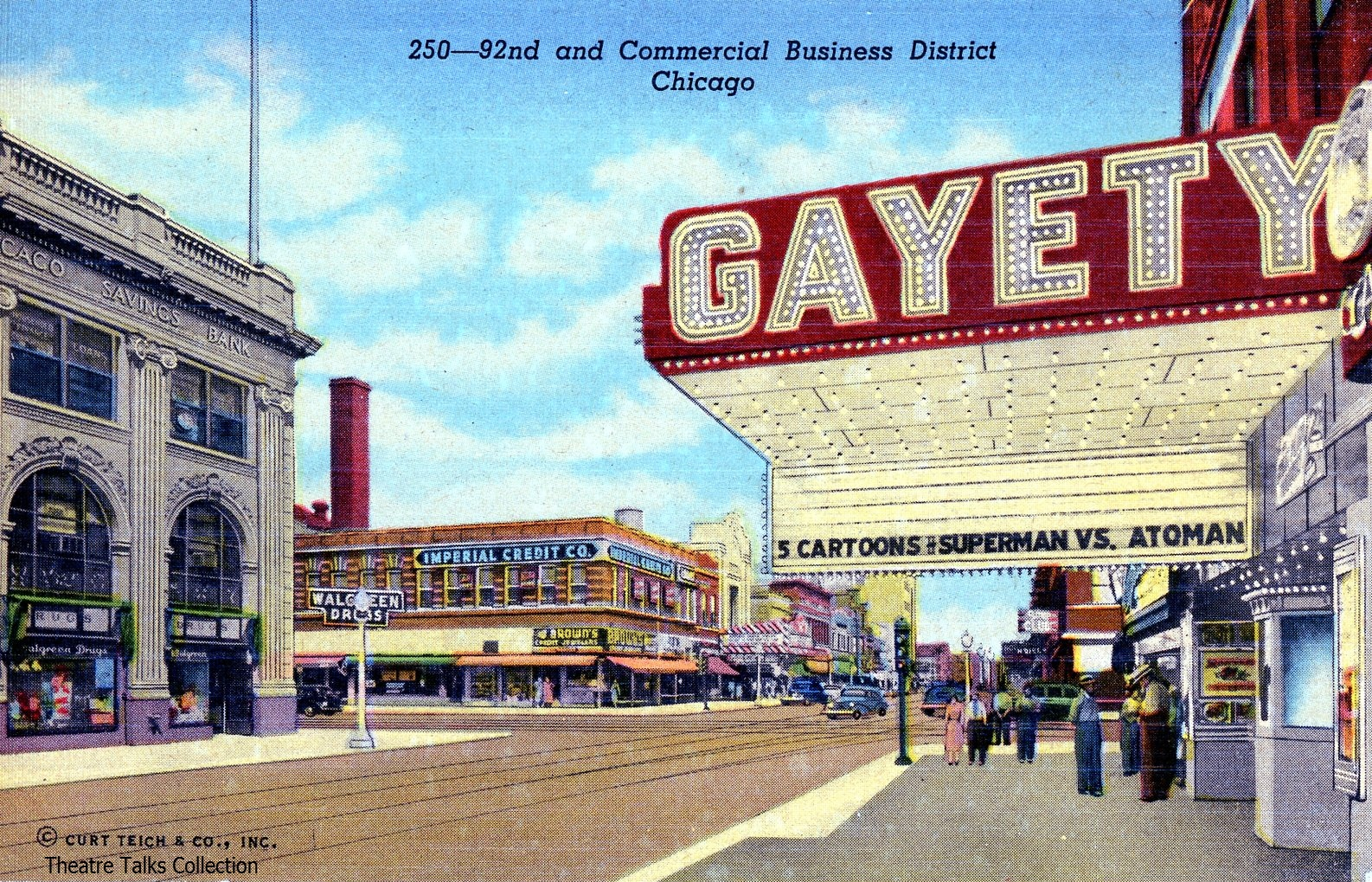
The cinema poster from the Gayety Theatre in Chicago advertises the film with the slogan 'Superman vs. Atoman' (postcard from 1950)

Lyle Talbot, who had previously starred as Commissioner Jim Gordon in the 1949 Columbia Serial Batman and Robin, here portrays Luthor (and also Luthor's alter-ego "Atom Man"). In his "Atom Man" disguise, Talbot, as Luthor, utilizes a vaguely German accent and wears an ominous mask fashioned from a "Metallogen Man" robot costume left over from 1945's The Monster and the Ape. Despite their onscreen personas, Talbot (Luthor), who wore a rubber scalp to create the impression of baldness, and Alyn (Superman) spent much of their time, when not shooting, exchanging recipes, both actors shared an interest in cookery.

=== Special effects ===
The final set piece shows Metropolis under attack by "poorly animated" flying saucers and a torpedo.

The flying effects were somewhat improved in this film than in the original by the simple expedient of turning the camera on its side. Kirk Alyn stood with arms raised in front of a cyclorama, while a wind machine and smoke pot were placed above him (out of frame). This gave an inexpensive illusion of flight. Longer shots continued to use cartoon animation of the Man of Steel.

== Critical appraisal ==
In their book The Great Movie Serials, Jim Harman and Donald F. Glut describe the serial as "far more gimmicky and gadget-prone" than the first Superman serial. In addition to this, they also found it to be flawed with its cheapness characteristic in Katzman productions.

== Home media ==
In 2006, the Atom Man vs. Superman serial was still available for purchase on VHS videotape, where it was first released back in 1989 as a double tape box set. The serial was also available in two separate VHS tapes as Volume 1 (Chapters 1 - 7) and Volume 2 (Chapters 8 - 15). It was officially released on DVD by Warner Home Video, along with its predecessor, 1948's Superman, on November 28, 2006, as Superman - The Theatrical Serials Collection.

With the previous 2006 DVD release out of print for a few years, on October 9, 2018, the serials were re-released as manufactured-on-demand (MOD) DVD from Warner Archive Collection.

== Chapter titles ==
1. Superman Flies Again
2. Atom Man Appears
3. Ablaze in the Sky
4. Superman Meets Atom Man
5. Atom Man Tricks Superman
6. Atom Man's Challenge
7. At the Mercy of Atom Man
8. Into the Empty Doom
9. Superman Crashes Through
10. Atom Man's Heat Ray
11. Luthor's Strategy
12. Atom Man Strikes
13. Atom Man's Flying Saucers
14. Rocket of Vengeance
15. Superman Saves the Universe

== See also ==
- List of film serials by year
- List of film serials by studio

Preceded by Cody of the Pony Express (1950)	Columbia Serial; Atom Man vs. Superman (1950)	Succeeded by Pirates of the High Seas (1950)
