= Carol Forman =

American actress (1919–1997)

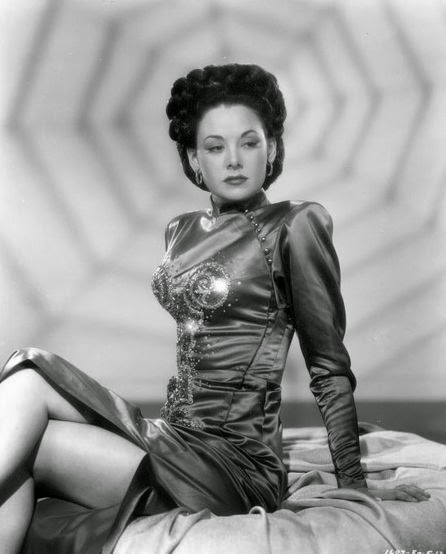
- Carol Forman in the movie serial, "The Black Widow" (1947)
- Born: Maude Carolyn Sawls; June 19, 1919; Epes, Alabama, U.S.
- Died: July 9, 1997 (aged 78); Burbank, California, U.S.
- Occupation: Television actress
- Years active: 1946–1961
- Spouse(s): Robert Forman (1940-?) (divorced); William Dennis (?-1979) (his death)

Carol Forman (June 19, 1919 – July 9, 1997) was an American actress best known for playing exotic villains in action serials, particularly Spider Lady in the 1948 Superman serial, as well as Sombra, the lead villainess in the 1947 Republic serial The Black Widow.

Carol raised three step daughters by William Dennis while they were married. They lived in Corpus Christi Texas for several years.

== Early life ==
Born Maude Carolyn Sawls in Epes, Alabama on July 19, 1919 (some sources indicate 1918), the eldest of two children of Edward D. Sawls, a carpenter, and Annabelle Fleming, a homemaker. Her interest in acting began as a youngster. By the time she was six years old, she was starring in school plays. She would continuing acting throughout high school.

As a teenager, she moved to Memphis. While in Memphis, she worked as a cosmetics salesperson. It was there that she met and married her first husband, Robert D. Forman in 1940. The marriage didn't last long.

== Career ==
By the mid-1940s, Forman had moved to California. While working in small community theater productions, mostly in unsympathetic roles, she was discovered by a talent scout from RKO Pictures. In 1946, RKO signed her to a contract. One of her early roles was playing Raymond Burr's girlfriend in his first film, Code of the West. She played opposite Burr again in San Quentin.

Forman became better known for her appearances in movie serials in which she differed from other actresses by playing villainesses exclusively. Her characters occasionally used disguises to go undercover or to impersonate other characters, in the same manner as Batman, or Artemis Gordon in The Wild Wild West TV series years later. In 1952, in the nostalgic musical comedy By the Light of the Silvery Moon starring Doris Day, Forman spoofed her serial persona by appearing briefly as an evil woman in a young boy's daydream.

She also made guest appearances on The Cisco Kid starring Duncan Renaldo and Leo Carrillo in the early 1950s.

== Filmography ==
Year	Title	Role	Notes
1946	From This Day Forward	Counselor in Unemployment Office	Uncredited
1946	Nocturne	Receptionist	Uncredited
1946	The Falcon's Adventure	Helen Ray	
1946	San Quentin	Ruthie	
1947	Code of the West	Milly	
1947	Honeymoon	Nurse	Uncredited
1947	Desperate	Mrs. Henry Roberts	Uncredited
1947	Under the Tonto Rim	Juanita	
1947	The Black Widow	Sombra, The Black Widow	Serial
1947	Brick Bradford	Queen Khana	Serial
1948	Docks of New Orleans	Nita Aguirre	
1948	Superman	Spider Lady	Serial
1948	The Mozart Story	Catherine Cavallieri	(new scenes)
1948	The Feathered Serpent	Sonia Cabot	
1949	Federal Agents vs. Underworld, Inc	Nila	Serial
1949	Brothers in the Saddle	Flora Trigby	
1951	Oh! Susanna	Blonde	Uncredited
1952	Blackhawk	Laska	Serial
1953	By the Light of the Silvery Moon	Dangerous Dora	Uncredited
1961	Ada	Newspaper Woman	Uncredited, (final film role)

== Death ==
She died in Burbank, California on July 9, 1997, of natural causes.
