= Paul Stader =

American actor, assistant director and stuntman

- Born: February 13, 1911; Neosho, Missouri, U.S.
- Died: April 10, 1991 (aged 80); Los Angeles, California, U.S.
- Education: University of Kansas
- Occupations: Actor, assistant director, stuntman
- Years active: 1937–1991
- Spouse: Marilyn Stader

Paul Stader (February 13, 1911 – April 10, 1991) was an American actor, assistant director and stuntman.

== Life and career ==
Stader was born in Neosho, Missouri. He attended at the University of Kansas, where he played football and practiced swimming. Stader then moved to California, in which he would join the swimming team for the 1932 Summer Olympics in Los Angeles, California. He swam for the Summer Olympics, but didn't make it. While participating at the Summer Olympics, Stader became friends with 400-meter freestyle gold medal winner Buster Crabbe and actor, Johnny Weissmuller. He then was a lifeguard in Santa Monica, California. Stader began his film career in 1937, when he appeared in the film The Hurricane, doing 70-foot, 97-foot and 100-foot highdives. He also had to jump off a cliff. Stader doubled for actor, Jon Hall on the film.

Stader doubled for actor Kirk Alyn in the 1948 serial film Superman. He doubled for actors on numerous films including Our Man Flint, The Missouri Traveler, Demetrius and the Gladiators, The Great Waldo Pepper, The Towering Inferno, Captain Kidd and the Slave Girl, Revolt in the Big House, Creature from the Black Lagoon, Tarzan and the Leopard Woman, Last of the Badmen, Blazing Saddles, Voyage to the Bottom of the Sea, Valley of Head Hunters, Jungle Jim in the Forbidden Land and Our Man Flint. Stader said that his favorite stunt was in the film Markow, in which he doubled for actor Robert Mitchum, and fell from a roof and had his fall broken by an awning. He appeared in westerns, including The Virginian, Wanted: Dead or Alive, Wagon Train and Tales of Wells Fargo, among others, and doubled for actor John Wayne.

On television, Stader doubled for actor Lloyd Bridges in the action adventure television series Sea Hunt from 1958 to 1961.

== Death ==
Stader died in April 1991 in Los Angeles, California, at the age of 80.
