= The Reign of the Superman =

1933 story by Siegel and Shuster

- Short story by Jerry Siegel
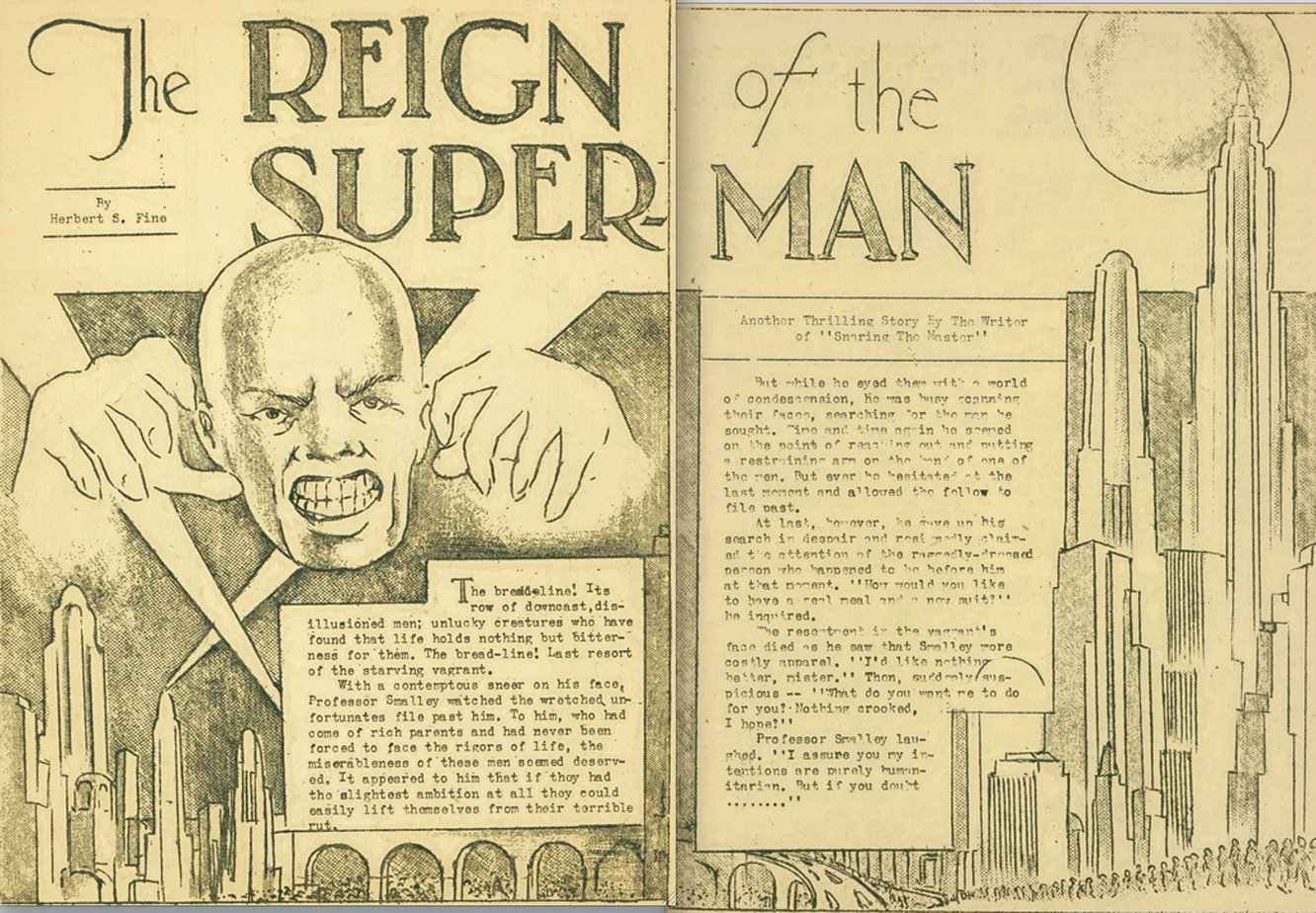
- Opening pages in the fanzine Science Fiction: The Advance Guard of Future Civilization #3.
- Country: USA
- Language: English

Publication
- Publication date: January 1933

"The Reign of the Superman" (January 1933) is a short story written by Jerry Siegel and illustrated by Joe Shuster. It was the writer/artist duo's first published use of the name Superman, which they later applied to their archetypal fictional superhero. The title character of this story is a telepathic villain, rather than a physically powerful hero like the well-known character. Although the name is hyphenated between syllables due to it being broken between pages on the story's opening spread, it is spelled Superman in the magazine's table of contents and in the story's text.

== Publication ==
High school friends Jerry Siegel and Joe Shuster tried selling stories to magazines in order to escape Depression-era poverty. With their work rejected by publishers, 18-year-old Shuster produced the duo's own typed, mimeographed science fiction fanzine titled Science Fiction: The Advance Guard of Future Civilization, producing five issues.

Siegel wrote "The Reign of the Superman" in 1932. Inspired by the spread of the term "superman" in popular culture of their time and thus indirectly inspired by Friedrich Nietzsche's idea of a super-human (the Übermensch), it featured a meek man transformed into a powerful villain bent on dominating the world. It appeared in issue #3 of the fanzine, with accompanying artwork by Shuster. Siegel published it under the pen name Herbert S. Fine, combining the first name of a cousin with his mother's maiden name.

The term "superman" derives from a common English translation of the term Übermensch, which originated with Friedrich Nietzsche's statement, "Ich lehre euch den Übermenschen" ("I will teach you all the superman"), in his 1883 work Thus Spoke Zarathustra. The term "superman" was popularized by George Bernard Shaw with his 1903 play Man and Superman. The character Jane Porter refers to Tarzan as a "superman" in the 1912 pulp novel Tarzan of the Apes by Edgar Rice Burroughs, and Siegel would later name Tarzan as an influence on the creation of his and Shuster's character.

== Story ==
A chemist named Professor Ernest Smalley randomly chooses raggedly dressed vagrant Bill Dunn from a bread line and recruits him to participate in an experiment in exchange for "a real meal and a new suit". When Smalley's experimental potion grants Dunn telepathic super powers, the man becomes intoxicated by his power and seeks to rule the world. This superpowered man uses these abilities for embittered tyranny, only to discover that the potion's effects are temporary. The Super Man vanquishes the equally evil Smalley, who had intended to kill Dunn first as a dog-eat-dog attempt to give himself the same successfully-tested super powers, Dunn realizes that this was a horrible mistake by not keeping Smalley alive to torture and interrogate the secret formula from him, and instead found himself desperately using his low-level knowledge to recreate it. As the story ends, Dunn's powers wear off and he realizes he will be returning to the bread line to be a forgotten man once more.

=== Tuckerization ===
The last two pages of the story feature a reporter named Forrest Ackerman, an early example of what would come to be known as tuckerization. The real Ackerman was not only a friend of Siegel and Shuster, but actually has a brief review on the same page of the fanzine as the last page of the story in which the character named after him appears.

== Subsequent "Superman" characters ==
In 1933, Siegel read a 48-page black-and-white comic book titled Detective Dan, whose title character was a "secret operative". Siegel thought that a superman who was a hero could make a great comic character, and conceived one bearing little resemblance to his villainous namesake. He wrote a crime story which Shuster drew in comic format. Titling it The Superman, they offered it to Consolidated Book Publishing, the company that had published Detective Dan. Although the duo received an encouraging letter, Consolidated never again published comic books. Discouraged, Shuster burned all pages of the story, but the cover survived because Siegel rescued it from the fire. Siegel and Shuster compared the character to Slam Bradley, a private detective the pair later created for Detective Comics #1 (March 1937). Siegel later said that they had a great character and they were determined it would be published. Siegel and Shuster would next use the name in the story they sold to DC Comics, which was published in June 1938's Action Comics #1.

== Later references ==
- After DC Comics' storyline "The Death of Superman", and before Superman's return from the dead, four Superman-themed characters replace him, in a storyline called "Reign of the Supermen", which ran through Action Comics and other Superman titles (June–October 1993).
- In DC's year-long weekly series 52, the events of issue #35 (January 2007) include numerous superhero characters abruptly losing their powers and falling from the sky, in a story with the pun title "Rain of the Supermen".
- DC's Tangent Universe features an alternate conception of "Superman" as a bald, highly evolved human.

== Collector's value ==
Few intact copies of Science Fiction #3 survive. Collectors value it both because of its rarity and because of its importance in the history behind the development of the superhero Superman. In September 2006, Heritage Auction Galleries in Dallas, Texas, auctioned a copy for $47,800.

== Reprints and digital reissues ==
- The Official Overstreet Comic Book Price Guide #18 reprints the first two pages with opening text and Shuster's splash art.
- Nemo, the Classic Comics Library #2 (August 1983) pp. 20–28 reprints the entire story. It has been retyped to salvage legibility, but the artwork and the original text have been preserved exactly.
- A digital copy of the magazine issue that includes this story is available from the University of Florida's digital collections.

== Bibliography ==
- Fine, Herbert S. (August 1983). "The Reign of the Superman". Nemo, the Classic Comics Library (2): 20–28. ISSN 0746-9438.
- Overstreet, Robert M. (1988). The Official Overstreet Comic Book Price Guide (18th ed.). House of Collectibles.
