= Kirk Alyn =

American actor (1910–1999)

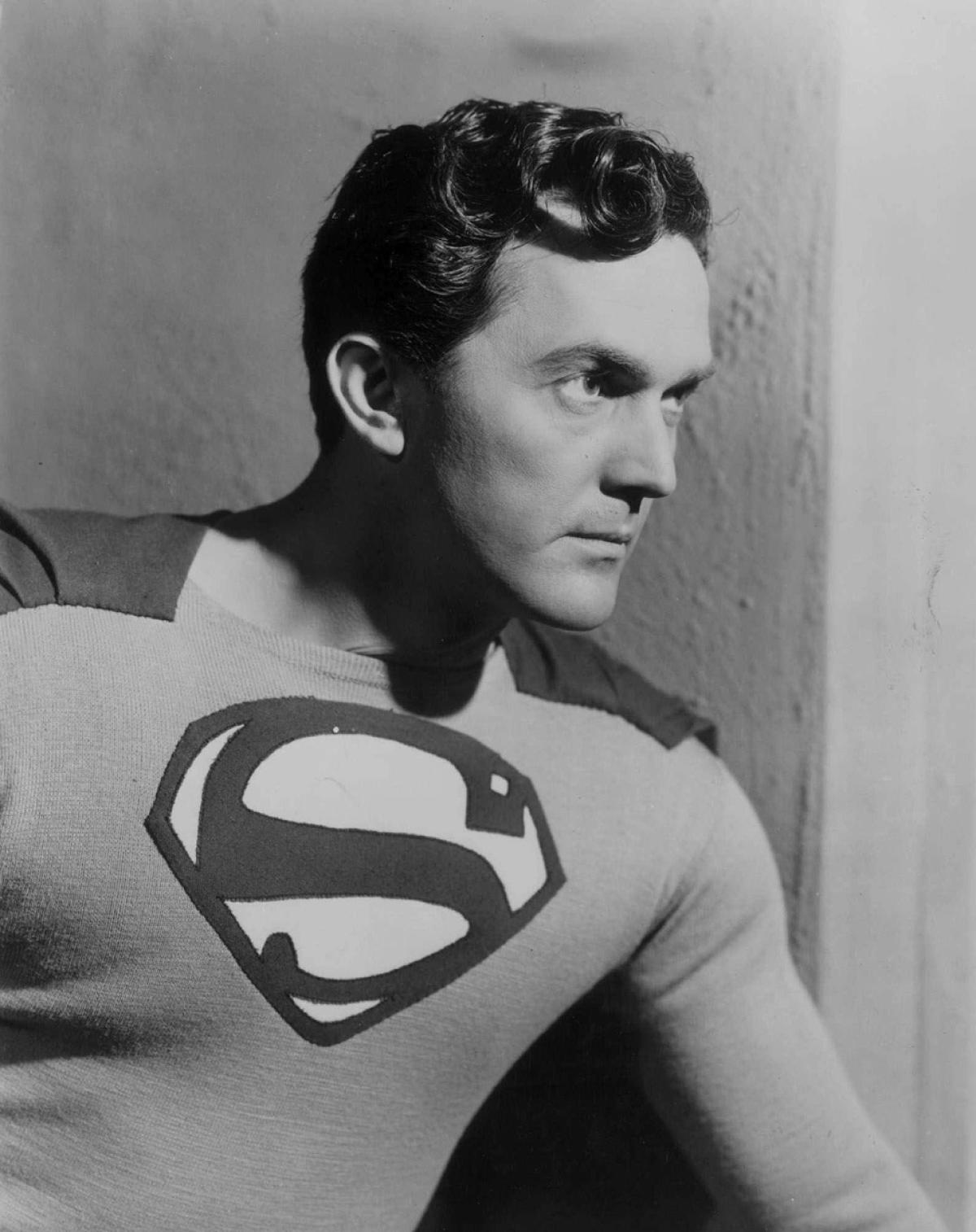
- Kirk Alyn as Superman in the 1948 movie serial
- Born: John Feggo Jr. October 8, 1910; Oxford, New Jersey, U.S.
- Died: March 14, 1999 (aged 88); The Woodlands, Texas, U.S.
- Occupation: Actor
- Years active: 1930–1988
- Spouse: Virginia O'Brien (m. 1942; div. 1955)
- Children: 3

Kirk Alyn (born John Feggo Jr.; October 8, 1910 – March 14, 1999) was an American actor, best known for being the first actor to play the DC Comics character Superman in live-action for the 1948 movie serial Superman and its 1950 sequel Atom Man vs. Superman, as well as fellow DC Comics characters Blackhawk from the Blackhawk movie serial in 1952, and Lois Lane's father Sam Lane in 1978's Superman.

== Early life ==
Kirk Alyn was born as John Feggo Jr. on October 8, 1910, in Oxford, New Jersey, to working class parents from Austria-Hungary. In his youth he lived in Wharton, New Jersey. A plaque commemorating his life in the borough is hung in the municipal building.

== Career ==
Alyn started as a chorus boy for Broadway plays, appearing in notable musicals such as Girl Crazy, Of Thee I Sing, and Hellzapoppin' during the 1930s.

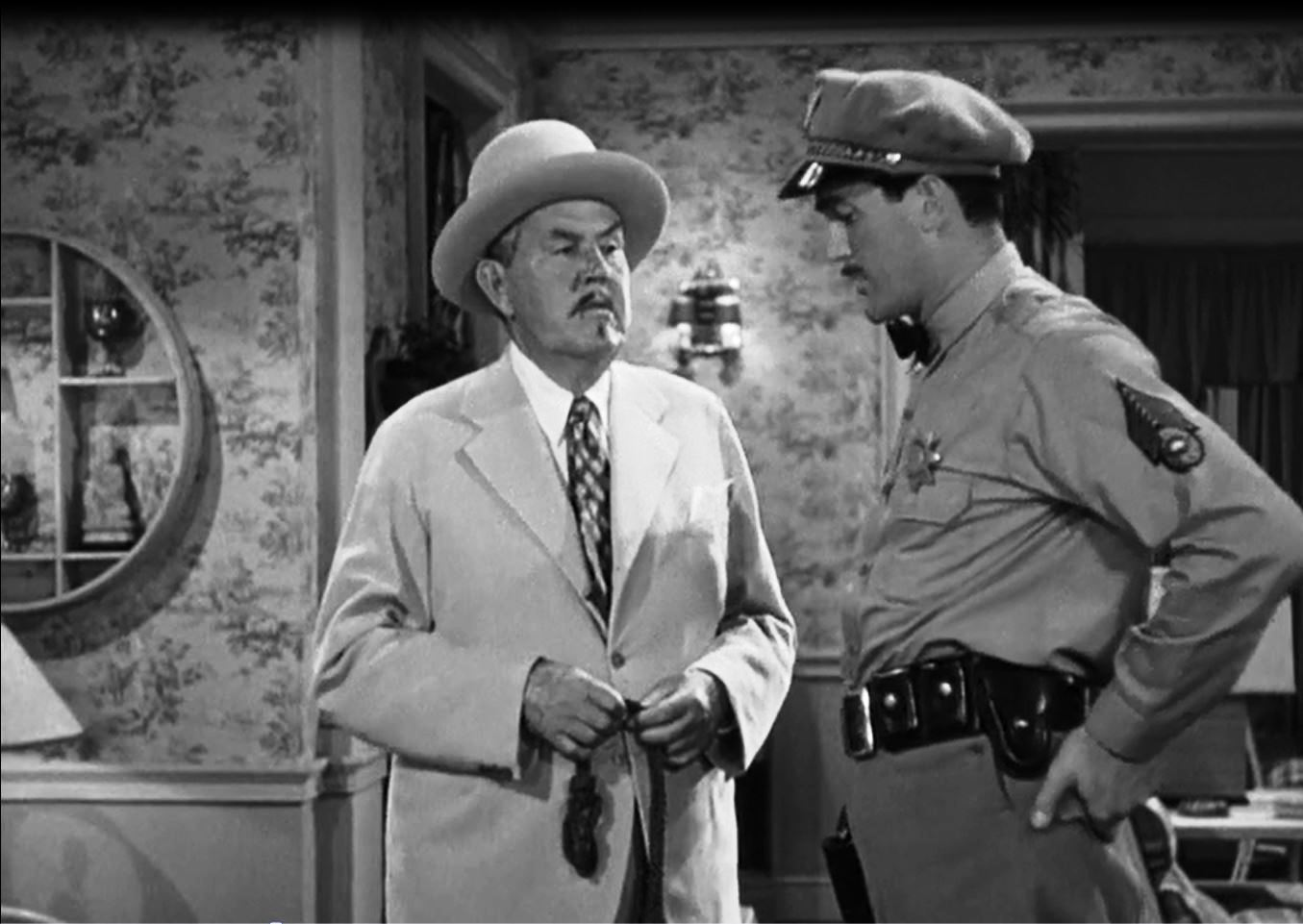
Alyn (right) and Sidney Toler as Charlie Chan in the film The Trap (1946).

He also worked as a singer and dancer in vaudeville before relocating to Hollywood during the early 1940s to act for feature movies, but he was successful only in gaining bit parts for low-budget movies before obtaining the role of Superman in 1948. During World War II, he served in the United States Navy.

Alyn also featured in movie serials, including Federal Agents Vs. Underworld Inc. (1948), Radar Patrol Vs. Spy King (1950) and Blackhawk (1952).

Alyn recalls the day producer Sam Katzman asked him to play Superman:

I thought it was a publicity stunt. I didn't think you could ever put Superman on film. They brought the people from D.C. Comics over and they said, 'Hey, he looks just like Clark Kent.' They said take off your shirt, so I did and flexed my muscles. Then the guy said, 'Take off your pants' and I said, 'Wait a minute.' I was 37 when I played Superman. I picked up that girl and ran up that flight of stairs like it was nothing."

Alyn played Superman for the first live-action Superman movie serial, released in 1948. The serial consisted of 15 episodes which recounted Superman's arrival on Earth, getting a job as a reporter at the Daily Planet newspaper, and meeting Lois Lane and Jimmy Olsen. The main plot consisted of Superman's battle against the arch criminal the Spider Lady.

Two years later, Atom Man vs. Superman was released, featuring Lyle Talbot as Superman's arch-villain Lex Luthor. This serial also included a sequence involving an eerie alternate dimension, not unlike the Phantom Zone, which would not appear in the comics for another 11 years.

Alyn gave the Man of Steel a different portrayal to Clark Kent, adding to the element of disguise. This was in the tradition of radio's Superman, Bud Collyer. By contrast, his successor George Reeves played the dual roles more alike, as pointed out in Gary Grossman's book, Superman: Serial to Cereal. The character's flight was affected by having Alyn jump up, at which point he becomes represented by an animated character by way of rotoscoping, which flew away. Alyn had tried "flying" while suspended by hidden wires for the first serial but the wires turned out to be clearly visible and that footage was scrapped.)

After playing Superman, he again suffered casting problems. Apart from featuring in some similar comic book-type serials, he had few roles in television series and movies, some even uncredited, until he retired.

Alyn was reportedly offered the part of Superman for the television version of 1951, but refused it. In 1971, he published an autobiography entitled A Job for Superman.

Alyn shared a very brief cameo with his serial co-star, Noel Neill, as Sam and Ellen Lane, the parents of the young Lois Lane for the 1978 feature movie, Superman. In a brief on-set interview, he explains his method of portraying Superman and Clark Kent, contained in a documentary narrated by Ernie Anderson, The Making of Superman: The Movie (1978).

In 1981, Alyn appeared as "Pa Cant" in the parody movie Superbman: The Other Movie, a role that lasted only seconds, as Cant dies from heart failure immediately after discovering the strange visitor from the planet "Krapton".

Alyn made his final movie, the horror movie Scalps, in 1983.

In 1988, he participated in the 1988 TV special Superman 50th Anniversary Special as himself. He also had a very brief appearance in a Battlestar Galactica episode.

== Personal life ==
When he first went to Hollywood, Alyn met another performer, singer, dancer, and actress Virginia O'Brien. They were married in 1942, and had three children: daughters Terri O'Brien and Elizabeth Watkins and son John Feggo III. They were divorced in 1955.

== Death ==
Alyn died on March 14, 1999, in The Woodlands, Texas, at the age of 88 from Alzheimer's disease. He was cremated. His ashes were scattered off the coast of California.

== Honors ==
Alyn was the grand marshal of the Metropolis, Illinois Christmas parade and Annual Superman Celebrations several times. In 1985, DC Comics named Alyn as one of the honorees in the company's 50th anniversary publication Fifty Who Made DC Great.

Alyn received the Inkpot Award in 1974.

== Filmography ==
Year	Title	Role	Notes
1930	Fast and Loose	Man Seated at Table in Speakeasy	Uncredited
1942	My Sister Eileen	Portuguese Merchant Marine Cadet	Uncredited
1942	Lucky Jordan	Pearl's Boyfriend	Uncredited
1942	You Were Never Lovelier	Julia's Groom	Uncredited
1943	Aerial Gunner	Officer in Canteen	Uncredited
1943	Action in the North Atlantic	Brazilian Gun Captain	Uncredited
1943	Swing Shift Maisie	Victory Aircraft Official	Uncredited
1943	The Man from the Rio Grande	Tom Traynor - Editor	
1943	The Iron Major	John Cavanaugh	Uncredited
1943	Is Everybody Happy?	Larry Thew	Uncredited
1943	Overland Mail Robbery	Tom Hartley	
1943	Mystery Broadcast	Young Policeman	Uncredited
1943	Pistol Packin' Mama	J. Leslie Burton III	
1943	A Guy Named Joe	Officer in Heaven	Uncredited
1944	Four Jills in a Jeep	Pilot	Uncredited
1944	Broadway Rhythm	Escort	Uncredited
1944	Once Upon a Time	Attendant	Uncredited
1944	Cowboy and the Senorita	Lulubelle's Beau	Uncredited
1944	Goodnight, Sweetheart	Reporter	Uncredited
1944	Forty Thieves	Jerry Doyle	
1944	Call of the Rockies	Ned Crane	
1944	The Girl Who Dared	Josh Carroll	
1944	Storm Over Lisbon	Bandleader	Uncredited
1946	Daughter of Don Q	Cliff Roberts	Serial
1946	The Time of Their Lives	Dandy at Party	Uncredited
1946	The Trap	Police Sgt. Reynolds	
1947	The Beginning or the End	Scientist	Uncredited
1947	Little Miss Broadway	Det. Lt. Mel O'Brien	
1947	Sweet Genevieve	Dr. Wright	
1948	Superman	Kal-El / Clark Kent / Superman	Serial
1948	The Three Musketeers	Aramis' Friend	Uncredited
1949	Federal Agents vs. Underworld, Inc	Insp. David Worth	Serial
1949	Bride of Vengeance	Guard	Uncredited
1949	Radar Patrol vs. Spy King	Chris Calvert	Serial
1950	Atom Man vs. Superman	Kal-El / Clark Kent / Superman	Serial
1950	Gambling House	FBI Man	Uncredited
1951	When Worlds Collide	Rioter Bringing Guns	Uncredited
1952	Blackhawk	Blackhawk	Serial
1952	The Savage	Orderly	Uncredited
1956	The Eddy Duchin Story	Young Man at Wadsworths' Party	Uncredited
1957	Beginning of the End	B-52 Pilot	Uncredited
1957	No Time to Be Young	Mike, Gloria's Date	Uncredited
1967	Banning	Bidder	Uncredited
1968	P.J.	Supervisor	Uncredited
1970	The Great White Hope	Man in German Nightclub	Uncredited
1978	Superman	Sam Lane	Uncredited
1983	Scalps	Professor Machen	(final film role)

== Bibliography ==
- Grossman, Gary (1976). Superman: Serial to Cereal. Popular Library. ISBN 0-445-04054-8.
