= Superman (serial) =

1948 black-and-white film serial

- Theatrical release poster
- Directed by: Spencer Gordon Bennet; Thomas Carr
- Written by: Lewis Clay; Royal K. Cole; Arthur Hoerl; George H. Plympton; Joseph F. Poland
- Based on: Superman by: Jerry Siegel; Joe Shuster
- Produced by: Sam Katzman
- Starring: Kirk Alyn; Noel Neill; Carol Forman; Tommy Bond; Forrest Taylor
- Cinematography: Ira H. Morgan
- Edited by: Earl C. Turner
- Music by: Mischa Bakaleinikoff
- Color process: Black and white
- Distributed by: Columbia Pictures
- Release date: January 5, 1948 (United States)
- Running time: 15 chapters (244 minutes)
- Language: English

Superman is a 1948 15-part Columbia Pictures film serial based on the comic book character Superman. It stars an uncredited Kirk Alyn (billed on-screen only by his character's name, Superman; but credited as Kirk Alyn on the promotional posters) and Noel Neill as Lois Lane. It was the first live-action appearance of Superman on film. The serial was directed by Thomas Carr (who later directed many early episodes of the Adventures of Superman television series) and Spencer Gordon Bennet, produced by Sam Katzman, and shot in and around Los Angeles, California. It was originally screened at movie matinées, and after the first three scene-setting chapters, every episode ends on a cliffhanger. The Superman-in-flight scenes are animations, in part due to the small production budget.

A tremendous financial success, the serial made Kirk Alyn famous and launched Noel Neill's career. A sequel serial, Atom Man vs. Superman, also directed by Bennet, was released in 1950.

== Plot ==
Superman is sent to Earth by his parents just as the planet Krypton blows up and is later raised as Clark Kent by a farm couple. They discover that he has great powers, so they send him off to use his powers to help those in need. After his foster parents die, the Man of Steel heads to Metropolis in the bespectacled guise of Kent and joins the staff of the Daily Planet to be close to the news. Soon after, he is sent out to get the scoop on a new rock that a man has found that he calls Kryptonite, and Clark passes out; then and there, Superman discovers that his weakness is Kryptonite. Whenever emergencies happen, he responds in his true identity as Superman. This first serial revolves around the nefarious plot of a villain who calls herself the Spider Lady.

== Cast ==
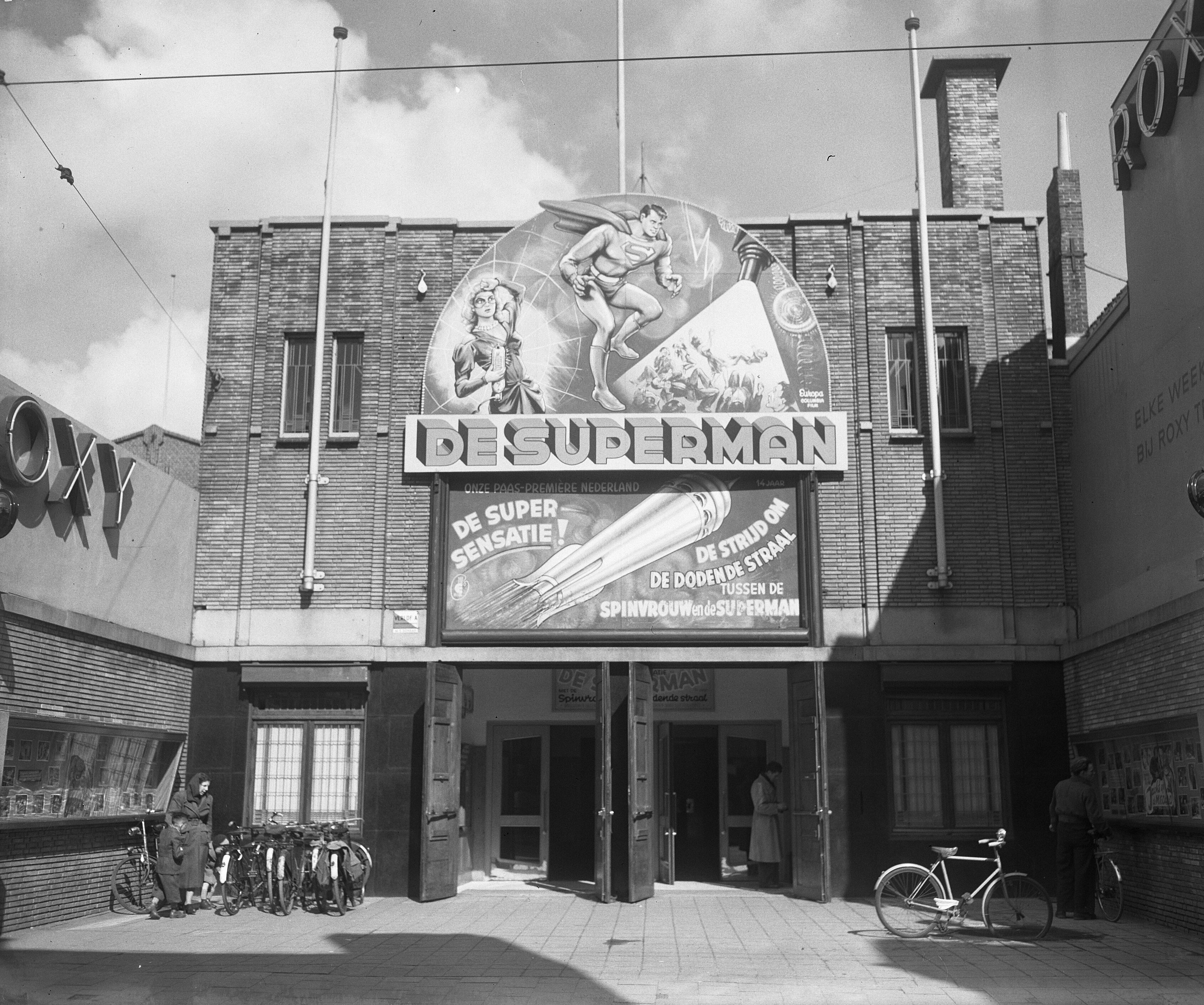
Cinema advertising the Superman movie (The Hague, 1950).

- Kirk Alyn as Kal-El / Clark Kent / Superman (uncredited)
  - Mason Alan Dinehart as young Clark Kent (uncredited)
- Noel Neill as Lois Lane
- Pierre Watkin as Perry White
- Tommy Bond as Jimmy Olsen
- Carol Forman as Spider Lady
- Herbert Rawlinson as Dr. Graham
- Forrest Taylor as Professor Arnold Leeds
- Charles Quigley as Dr. Hackett [Chs. 6-15]
- Jack Ingram as Anton
- Terry Frost as Brock
- Charles King as Conrad
- Stephen Carr as Morgan
- Rusty Wescoatt as Elton
- Paul Stader as Irwin (uncredited)
- Nelson Leigh as Jor-El (uncredited)
- Luana Walters as Lara (uncredited)
- Edward Cassidy as Eben Kent (uncredited)
- Virginia Carroll as Sarah Kent (uncredited)

Alyn, Neill, Watkin, and Bond reprised their roles in the 1950 sequel, Atom Man vs. Superman. Ingram, Frost, Wescoatt, and Stader also returned in new roles.

== Production ==
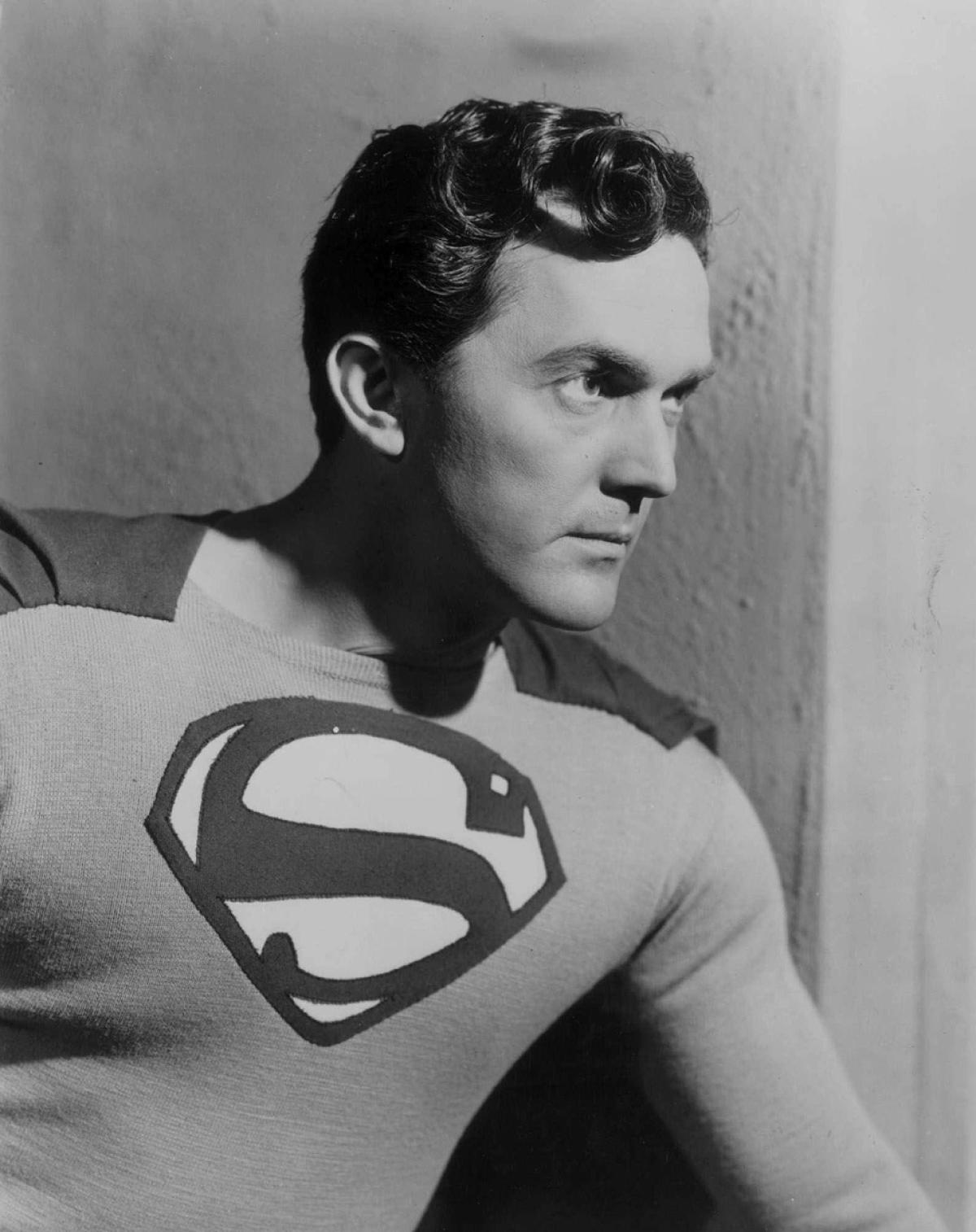
Kirk Alyn as Superman

Republic Pictures tried twice to produce a Superman serial. The first attempt was replaced by Mysterious Doctor Satan (1940), when licensing negotiations with Superman publisher National Comics failed. A second attempt was advertised for a 1941 release, but this time, two obstacles doomed production. National Comics insisted on absolute control of the script and production, and the rights to Superman were already committed to the Paramount cartoon series. Sam Katzman acquired the live-action rights in 1947. He tried to sell them to Universal, but they no longer made serials by then. He also tried to sell to Republic, but they claimed that "a superpowerful flying hero would be impossible to adapt"—despite having already successfully done just that with Adventures of Captain Marvel in 1941. Also, Republic was no longer buying properties for adaptation by 1947. Columbia accepted the offer.

Sam Katzman found Kirk Alyn after looking through photographs, but had a hard time selling the idea of casting Alyn to Whitney Ellsworth, National Comics' representative on the project. This was worsened when Alyn came in for a screen test, sporting a goatee and moustache (as he was also shooting another project, a historical film). These initial reservations were eventually overcome, and Alyn got the part. Columbia's advertising claimed that it could not get an actor to fill the role, so it had "hired Superman himself", and Alyn was merely playing Clark Kent.

George Plympton added a joke to the script, substituting the Lone Ranger's "Hi-Yo Silver!" for the traditional "Up, up, and away". This did not survive in the script long enough to be filmed. The Superman costume was grey and brown, instead of blue and red, because those colors photographed better on black and white film. It was never explained why his costume is shown as red and green on the one-sheet posters.

=== Special effects ===
For Superman's flight sequences, Kirk Alyn spent an entire day painfully suspended by wires in front of a rear projection of moving clouds. Displeased with the results, Katzman fired the entire flight sequence production staff and used an animated method to create Superman's flight sequences instead.

Due to the mix of animated and live-action footage, Superman's take-offs are almost always visible in the foreground, while his landings almost always occur behind objects, such as parked cars, rocks, and buildings. It was easier to shift from live footage of Kirk Alyn starting to take off to animated footage than it was to shift from an animated landing to live footage of the actor. As a consequence of the need to hide Superman's landings, Superman frequently lands at some distance from where he wants to be, and must run to arrive on-scene.

Budget limitations also dictated the frequent re-use of film footage, especially scenes of Superman flying. For example, a sequence showing Superman flying over a rocky hill (a shot of Stoney Point in Southern California's San Fernando Valley) was used at least once in almost every episode of the first serial.

=== Stunts ===
Kirk Alyn's stunt double was Paul Stader. He had to perform only one stunt in the entire serial, leaping from the back of a truck. He almost broke his leg during this stunt and had to leave the production. Stader returned in the 1950 sequel serial Atom Man vs. Superman, where he was credited as Killer Lawson.

== Reception ==
Superman achieved a wide distribution, even playing in theatres that had never booked a serial before.

== Home media ==
The Superman serial was first made available for purchase on VHS videotape in 1987 as a two-tape box set. The serial was also released in two separate VHS tapes as "Volume 1" (Chapters 1 to 7) and "Volume 2" (Chapters 8 to 15).

It was released on DVD by Warner Home Video, along with its sequel Atom Man vs. Superman, on November 28, 2006 as Superman: The Theatrical Serials Collection. Warner released the serials rather than Columbia, as Warner's subsidiary DC Comics acquired the rights to the serials several years beforehand. The serials were re-released as manufactured-on-demand (MOD) DVDs from Warner Archive Collection on October 9, 2018.

== Chapter titles ==
1. Superman Comes To Earth
2. Depths Of The Earth
3. The Reducer Ray
4. Man Of Steel
5. A Job For Superman
6. Superman In Danger
7. Into The Electric Furnace
8. Superman To The Rescue
9. Irresistible Force
10. Between Two Fires
11. Superman's Dilemma
12. Blast In The Depths
13. Hurled To Destruction
14. Superman At Bay
15. The Payoff

_{Source:}

== Sources ==
- Look, Up in the Sky: The Amazing Story of Superman
