= Greta Keller =

Austrian-American cabaret singer and actress (1903–1977)

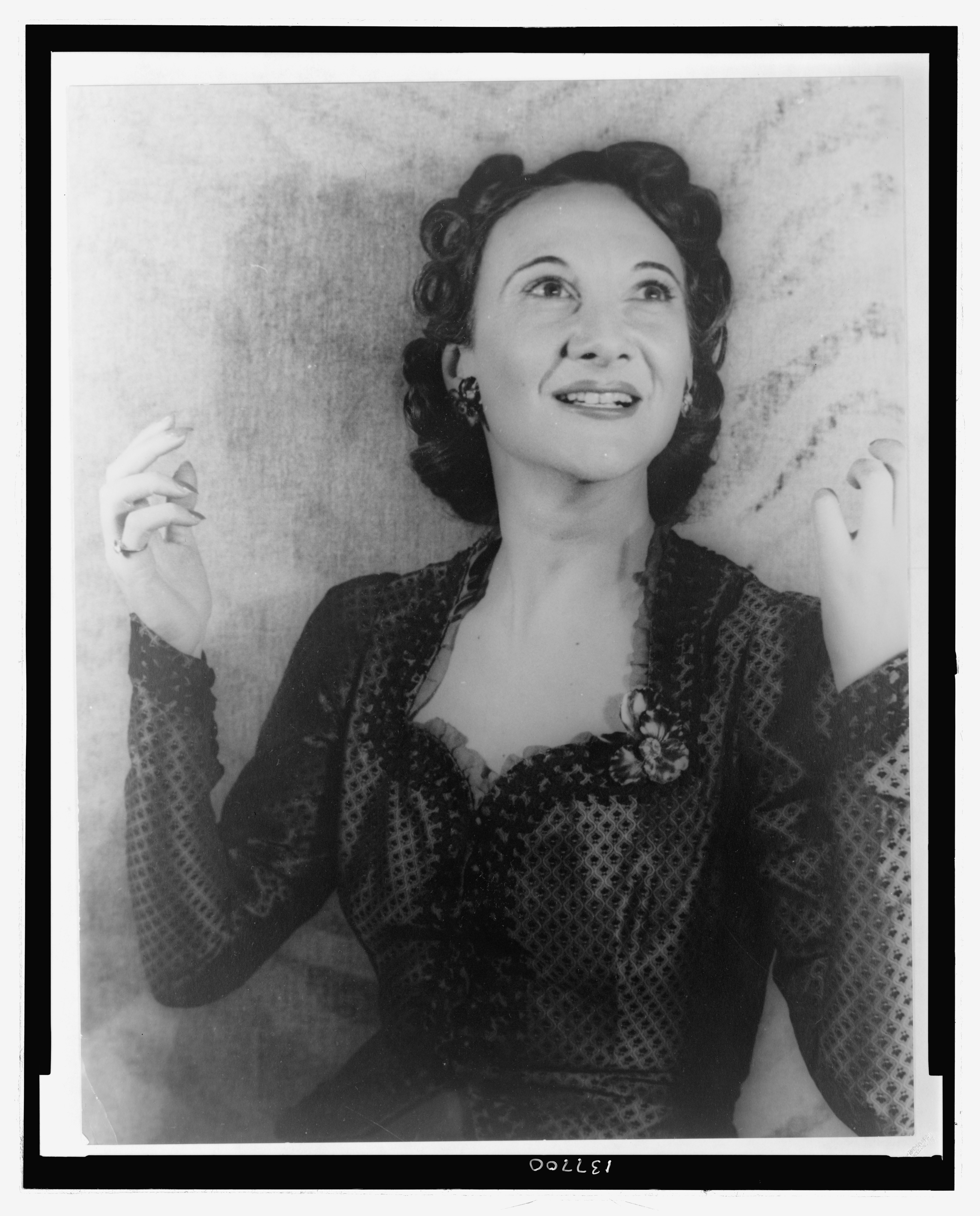
- Keller in 1940

Background information
- Born: Margaretha Keller; 8 February 1903; Vienna, Austria-Hungary
- Origin: Vienna, Austria
- Died: 11 November 1977 (aged 74)
- Genres: Cabaret; chanson; Lieder
- Occupations: Singer; actress
- Instruments: Vocals
- Years active: c. 1920s–1977
- Label: Ultraphon
- Spouses: Joe Sargent; David Bacon
- Partner: Wolfgang Nebmaier (1973–1977)

Margaretha "Greta" Keller (8 February 1903 – 11 November 1977) was an Austrian and American cabaret singer and actress. Best known for recordings of cabaret songs produced through a contract with Ultraphon that began in 1929, she also appeared in some television programs and Hollywood films (including Jules Dassin's 1942 Reunion in France).

== Career ==
Born Margaretha Keller in Vienna, Austria to Karl and Magdalena Keller, she pursued a life in the theater after refusing to follow her mother's career as a designer of fashionable hats. She took up her first professional position at the Vienna cabaret theater called Pavillion in 1928, performing mainly spoken monologues. Appearances in London and Paris followed, as did a 1929 recording contract with Ultraphon that helped her gain international fame. She appeared in New York for the first time in 1932, toured Sweden and Denmark between 1934 and 1935, and toured Germany with Peter Kreuder in 1936–1937. She gave a star turn at the Berlin cabaret Scala in connection with the 1936 Summer Olympics, and later claimed to have denied an offer to stay in Nazi Germany, though no corroborating evidence of this offer has been found in German sources from the time. She ceased performing in Europe after 1938, and from then on focused her career on New York City.

After the war, Keller resumed some engagements in Europe, mainly in Switzerland and the Netherlands. For two years in the early 1960s, she ran a club at the Waldorf Astoria called Greta's Keller or the Walldorfkeller, a play on her name and the German word for a cellar or bar. Five years before her death, her voice was heard in the Academy Award-winning movie Cabaret (1972), in which a recording of her performing the song "Heirat" ("Married") is played.

== Personal life ==
Greta Keller's first marriage was to the singer Joe Sargent, with whom she recorded some songs, began in 1928 and ended in divorce.

Her second marriage started and ended in Hollywood, where she met and married Gaspar Griswold Bacon, Jr. son of Gaspar G. Bacon from a prominent family in Boston. The elder Bacon was a member of the board of Harvard University, had been a close associate of J. P. Morgan, and later served as Secretary of State under Theodore Roosevelt and ambassador to France under William Howard Taft. In her later years, Keller disclosed that both she and Bacon were bisexuals and that their lavender marriage partly served as what she referred to as a "beard", allowing both of them to maintain the requisite façade in Hollywood, where they were both attempting to establish film careers.

Her husband, known in film and theater as David Bacon, was murdered in 1943, two weeks after finishing a major role in the Republic serial The Masked Marvel. Speculation involved affairs with Howard Hughes and another actor, but the murder investigations ceased without a result, and the files later disappeared.

From 1973 until her death in November 1977, Keller lived, worked, and traveled with her partner Wolfgang Nebmaier, who was 40 years her junior. A planned marriage between them did not come to pass before Keller's death in 1977.

== Death ==
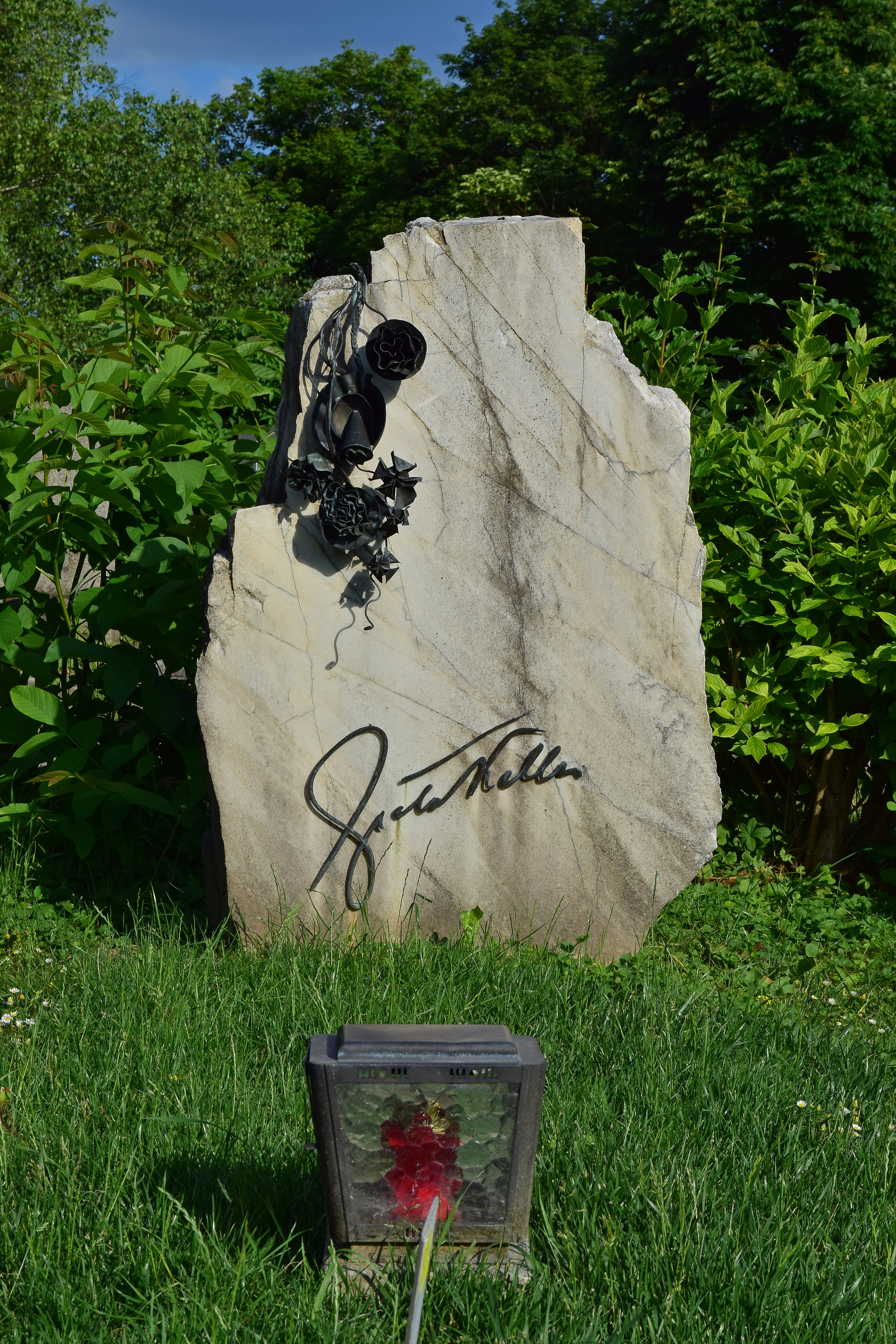
Greta Keller's grave

Keller died on November 11, 1977, aged 74. She was buried on the Wiener Zentralfriedhof.

== Filmography ==
- The Man in Search of His Murderer (1931)
- The Song of Life (1931) as Singer
- Melody of Love (1932) as Singer
- The Adventurer of Paris (1936) as Cabaret Singer
- Reunion in France (1942) as Baroness von Steinkamp
- Herz spielt falsch, Ein (1953) as Chansonniere/Cabaret Singer
- Blaue Stunde (1967) as Singer
- Cabaret (1972) (her voice is heard on a record as the singer of "Heirat")

=== As herself ===
- Underground and Emigrants (1976)

=== Notable TV appearances ===
- Five Fingers, playing Micheline in episode "Station Break" (episode # 1.1), 3 October 1959
- Drehscheibe, Die, playing Singer, 6 November 1968
- V.I.P.-Schaukel, playing Herself (episode # 4.3), 15 December 1974
