= List of Deerfield Academy alumni =

The List of Deerfield Academy alumni is a dynamic list of notable Deerfield Academy alumni, sorted chronologically.

== Pre-1900 ==
- George Grennell Jr. (1786–1877), U.S. congressman from Massachusetts
- Edward Hitchcock (1793–1864), president of Amherst College
- John Williams (1817–1899), presiding bishop of the Episcopal Church
- George Sheldon (1818–1916), politician and historian
- Mary Tenney Castle (1819–1907), missionary and philanthropist in Hawaii
- Rufus Saxton (1824–1908), Union Army brigadier general awarded Medal of Honor
- William Lincoln Higgins (1867–1957), U.S. congressman from Connecticut

== Classes of the 1920s ==
- Paul Langdon Ward (1911–2005), president of Sarah Lawrence College
- J. B. Jackson (1909–1996), writer, publisher, instructor, and sketch artist in landscape design

== Classes of the 1930s ==
- Budd Schulberg (1914–2009), screenwriter and novelist
- Hastings Keith (1915–2005), U.S. representative from Massachusetts
- Douglas Kennedy (1915–1973), actor
- Lyman Kirkpatrick (1916–1995), inspector general and executive director of the Central Intelligence Agency
- H. Stuart Hughes (1916–1999), academic and activist
- Edwin W. Martin (1917–1991), U.S. ambassador to Burma
- John Edward Sawyer (1917–1995), president of Williams College
- Robert Morgenthau (1919–2019), Manhattan district attorney
- James Colgate Cleveland (1920–1995), U.S. congressman from New Hampshire
- Thomas Hedley Reynolds (1920–2009), president of Bates College
- William Zinsser (1922–2015), writer, editor, literary critic, and teacher
- Gordon MacRae (1921–1986), singer and actor
- Ian Barbour (1923–2013), Templeton Prize winner
- Charles Merrill Jr. (1920-2017), writer, teacher and philanthropist
- John Mecklin (1918–1971), writer and journalist

== Classes of the 1940s ==
- Talcott Williams Seelye (1922–2006), U.S. ambassador to Syria and Libya
- John Chafee (1922–1999), U.S. senator from and governor of Rhode Island; secretary of the Navy under President Richard Nixon
- David S. Dodge (1922–2009), vice-president for administration (1979–83), acting president (1981–82) and president (1996–97) of the American University in Beirut
- Thomas Keating (1923–2018), monk
- Arthur Nims (1923–2019), chief judge of United States Tax Court
- Charles Clapp (1923–2004), judge of United States Tax Court
- Dickinson R. Debevoise (1924–2015), district judge on the United States District Court for the District of New Jersey
- John Weinberg (1925–2006), chairman of Goldman Sachs
- Ogden R. Reid (1925–2019), U.S. congressman from New York, U.S. ambassador to Israel
- Henry W. Kendall (1926–1999), physicist, 1990 Nobel Prize recipient
- Daniel C. Searle (1926–2007), heir, CEO of G. D. Searle & Company, conservative philanthropist
- John Ashbery (1927–2017), poet
- James Wadsworth Symington (born 1927), U.S. congressman from Missouri
- Carl Richard Woese (1928–2012), biologist, discovered archeabacteria
- Allen Stack (1928–1999), gold medalist, U.S. swimmer at the 1948 Summer Olympics in London
- George Quincey Lumsden Jr. (1930–2026), U.S. ambassador to the United Arab Emirates
- Gilbert Melville Grosvenor (born 1931), president of the National Geographic Society, 2004 Presidential Medal of Freedom
- Malcolm H. Kerr (1931–1984), president of the American University of Beirut
- John McPhee (born 1931), nonfiction writer, wrote The Headmaster, regular contributor to The New Yorker
- Hoddy Hildreth (1931–2019), member of the Maine House of Representatives and conservationist; son of Governor of Maine Horace Hildreth

== Classes of the 1950s ==
- Rodman Rockefeller (1932–2000), philanthropist
- Edward Hoagland (1932–2026), writer
- Richard Mellon Scaife (1932–2014), billionaire Mellon family heir, and philanthropist
- Nelson Doubleday Jr. (1933–2015), former owner of the publishing house Doubleday and the New York Mets
- Thomas C. Reed (1934–2024), secretary of the Air Force
- Warren Zimmermann (1934–2004), final U.S. ambassador to Yugoslavia
- Robert Hazard Edwards (1935–2025), president of Carleton College; president of Bowdoin College
- James M. Banner Jr. (born 1935), historian
- Steven C. Rockefeller (born 1936), philanthropist
- Frederick Louis "Fritz" Maytag III (born 1937), former owner of Anchor Brewing Company
- Kit Bond (born 1939), U.S. senator from and governor of Missouri
- Eric Widmer (1940–2025), headmaster of Deerfield Academy; headmaster of King's Academy
- David H. Koch (1940–2019), billionaire, Libertarian vice-presidential candidate in 1984
- David Childs (1941–2025), architect

== Classes of the 1960s ==
- Don Abbey, real estate businessman
- Bruce Faulkner Caputo (born 1943), U.S. congressman from New York
- Robert Beavers (born 1949), experimental filmmaker
- Pete Varney (born 1949), Major League Baseball player
- Stephen G. Smith (born 1949), journalist
- Steven Brill (born 1950), journalist and publisher
- Edwin S. Grosvenor (born 1951), editor and publisher
- Peter Gabel (1947–2022), law academic and associate editor of Tikkun, son of actors Arlene Francis and Martin Gabel
- Howie Carr (born 1952), journalist and radio host
- Winthrop H. Smith Jr. (born 1949), former executive vice president of Merrill; chairman of Merrill Lynch International, Inc.

== Classes of the 1970s ==
- Stephen Hannock (born 1951), painter
- Jeffrey Bewkes (born 1953), CEO of Time Warner
- Nigel Newton (born 1955), publisher, founder of Bloomsbury Publishing
- Kerry Emanuel (born 1955), scholar
- Buddy Teevens (1956–2023), head football coach at Dartmouth College
- Ken Bentsen Jr. (born 1959), U.S. congressman from Texas
- Prince Alexander-Georg von Auersperg (born 1959), son of Sunny von Bulow; member of the aristocratic principality of Auersperg
- Haun Saussy (born 1960), scholar

== Classes of the 1980s ==
- King Abdullah II al-Hussein of Jordan (born 1962)
- Robert M. McDowell (born 1963), commissioner at the Federal Communications Commission 2006–2013
- Adam S. Weinberg (born 1965), president of Denison University
- Matthew Fox (born 1966), actor
- Mark Rockefeller (born 1967), philanthropist
- Mike Trombley (born 1967), Major League Baseball player
- Nestor Carbonell (born 1967), actor
- Craig Janney (born 1967), NHL player
- Chris Waddell (born 1968), gold medalist Paralympic skier
- Ted Ullyot, former Facebook general counsel, partner at Andreessen Horowitz
- Milton Sands III (born c. 1969), admiral in the United States Navy
- Matt Scannell, (born 1970), lead vocalist and founding member of Vertical Horizon

== Classes of the 1990s ==
- Chris Klug (born 1972), bronze medalist, U.S. snowboarder at the 2002 Winter Olympics in Salt Lake City, Utah
- Michael Sucsy (born 1973), filmmaker, Grey Gardens
- Prince Hussain Aga Khan (born 1974), photographer and second son of Aga Khan IV
- Prince Ali bin Hussein (born 1975), Jordanian royal and vice president of FIFA; attended for a year without graduating, made honorary graduate of the Class of 2006
- Jay Newton-Small (born 1975), Bloomberg News and Time magazine reporter covering the White House and US politics; CEO and co-founder of MemoryWell
- Chase Coleman III (born 1975), class of 1993, investor and founder of Tiger Global Management
- Marty Reasoner (born 1977), retired National Hockey League center
- Randal Williams (born 1978), National Football League player
- Peter Cambor (born 1978), actor
- Bom Kim (born 1978), class of 1996, Korean-American billionaire and founder of Coupang
- Adriana Cisneros (born 1979), media mogul
- Jamie Hagerman (born 1981), bronze medalist, U.S. women's hockey, player at the 2006 Winter Olympics in Turin
- Hannah Pittard, class of 1997, novelist

== Classes of the 2000s ==
- Tunji Balogun, CEO of Def Jam Recordings
- David Branson Smith (born 1984), screenwriter of Ingrid Goes West and Adrift
- Ben Lovejoy (born 1984), retired ice hockey defenseman in the National Hockey League
- Ty McCormick (born 1987), foreign correspondent
- Molly Schaus (born 1988), U.S. women's hockey player at the 2010 Winter Olympics in Vancouver
- Paul Johnson Calderon, television personality and fashion journalist
- Alex Killorn (born 1988), professional ice hockey forward for the Tampa Bay Lightning of the National Hockey League
- Willy Workman (born 1990), American-Israeli basketball player for Hapoel Jerusalem in the Israeli Basketball Premier League

== Classes of the 2010s ==
- Kevin Roy (born 1993), professional ice hockey forward for the Anaheim Ducks of the National Hockey League
- Jacob Lee (born 1994), singer-songwriter
- Osama Khalifa (born 1995), squash player, winner of 2017 Squash National Championship
- Sam Lafferty (born 1995), professional ice hockey forward for the Pittsburgh Penguins of the National Hockey League
- Brandon Wu (born 1997), professional golfer on the PGA Tour
- Hunter Long (born 1998), professional football tight end for the Los Angeles Rams
- Liam Holowesko (born 2000), professional cyclist

== Classes of the 2020s ==
- Dominic Sessa (born 2002), actor
- Elic Ayomanor (born 2003), Canadian football player

== See also ==
- Category:Deerfield Academy alumni
