= David Bacon (actor) =

American actor (1914–1943)

- Born: Gaspar Griswold Bacon Jr. March 24, 1914; Barnstable, Massachusetts, U.S.
- Died: September 12, 1943 (aged 29); Santa Monica, California, U.S.
- Cause of death: Homicide
- Resting place: Woods Hole Village Cemetery (Woods Hole, Massachusetts, U.S.)
- Education: Deerfield Academy; Harvard University
- Occupation: Actor
- Spouse: Greta Keller (m. 1942)
- Parent(s): Gaspar G. Bacon; Priscilla Tolland
- Relatives: Robert Bacon (grandfather); Robert L. Bacon (uncle)

David Bacon (born Gaspar Griswold Bacon Jr., March 24, 1914 – September 12, 1943) was an American stage and film actor.

== Early life and education ==
Bacon was born in Barnstable, Massachusetts, and his family was one of the prominent, politically active Boston Brahmin families. His father, Gaspar G. Bacon, was on the board of Harvard University, and later, in the 1930s, served as Lieutenant Governor of Massachusetts.

Born to a life of privilege and wealth, David Bacon attended Deerfield Academy and graduated from Harvard in 1937.

He summered with his family at Woods Hole on Cape Cod, where he became involved during the early 1930s with the "University Players", at West Falmouth. There he met the then-unknown performers James Stewart and Henry Fonda, with whom he later shared accommodations while he struggled to establish himself.

== Career ==
Bacon's acting career failed to progress, and he drifted for several years. He moved to New York City, where he was sponsored by a wealthy British patron, and although he once again failed to secure employment, he began to wear expensive clothes and jewelry, leading to speculation that he was acting as a gigolo.

He moved to Los Angeles, where he met and married Austrian singer and actress Greta Keller, eleven years his senior, in 1942. In her later years, Keller disclosed that both she and Bacon were bisexuals and that their lavender marriage partly served as what she referred to as a "beard", allowing both of them to maintain the requisite façade in Hollywood, where they were both attempting to establish film careers.

In 1942, Howard Hughes met Bacon, and signed him to an exclusive contract, with the intention of casting him in The Outlaw (1943) as Billy the Kid. Bacon screen tested for the role and was found unsuitable. Though Hughes later decided not to use Bacon in The Outlaw, replacing him with actor Jack Beutel, he kept Bacon to the terms of his contract, casting him in several smaller roles, usually as college boys. Keller alleged that there was a homosexual relationship between Hughes and Bacon, and she blamed the alleged relationship for Bacon's being replaced. Hughes, however, was widely known as a womanizer and was often the target of unscrupulous claims to cash in on his money. Later, Hughes did lend Bacon for a role in the Republic Pictures serial The Masked Marvel (1943). The serial was produced with a low budget, and marked a low point in Bacon's career, with Keller recalling that he was completely humiliated. Today, it remains his best remembered work.

== Death and burial ==
On September 12, 1943, Bacon was seen driving a car erratically in Santa Monica, California, before running off the road and into the curb. Several witnesses saw him climb out of the car and stagger briefly before collapsing. As they approached, he asked them to help him, but he died before he could say anything more. A small puncture wound was found in his back; the weapon had punctured his lung and caused his death. A weapon was never found, though the wound was suggested to be from a stiletto.

Keller, who was then five months pregnant, collapsed when she heard of her husband's death. She was inconsolable and was given sedatives by Bacon's brother, a doctor. On September 20, eight days after Bacon's death, Keller went into labor and delivered a stillborn.

When he died, Bacon was wearing only a swimsuit, and a wallet and camera were found in his car. Also in his car was a small sweater not belonging to Bacon. Allegedly, the film from the camera was developed and found to contain only one image, that of Bacon, nude and smiling on a beach. The case attracted publicity for a time and remains unsolved.

David Bacon was cremated at Cunningham & O'Connor Mortuary in Santa Monica. His remains were shipped to Massachusetts, where they were interred at Woods Hole Village Cemetery (also known as Church of the Messiah Memorial Garden) in Woods Hole, Massachusetts.

== See also ==
- List of American actors
- List of Deerfield Academy alumni
- List of Harvard University people
- List of people from Los Angeles
- List of people from Massachusetts
- List of people from New York City
- List of unsolved murders (1900–1979)
