= The Voice (Australian TV series) season 3 =

The Voice
- Season 3
- Promotional poster featuring coaches Martin, Minogue, will.i.am, and Madden
- Hosted by: Darren McMullen
- Judges: Joel Madden; Ricky Martin; Kylie Minogue will.i.am
- Winner: Anja Nissen
- Winning coach: will.i.am
- Runner-up: Jackson Thomas

Release
- Original network: Nine Network
- Original release: 4 May – 21 July 2014

Season chronology
- ← Previous; Season 2 Next → Season 4

The third season of The Voice, the Australian reality talent show, premiered on 4 May 2014 and concluded on 21 July 2014 with Anja Nissen being crowned the winner. Both Kylie Minogue and will.i.am joined the show this season (replacing Delta Goodrem and Seal, respectively) but left at the end of the season. Anja Nissen was announced the winner of this season on 21 July 2014, marking will.i.am's first and only win as a coach, as well as, the first coach to win on his exclusive season.

== Coaches and hosts ==
Coaches and Host of The Voice Season 3

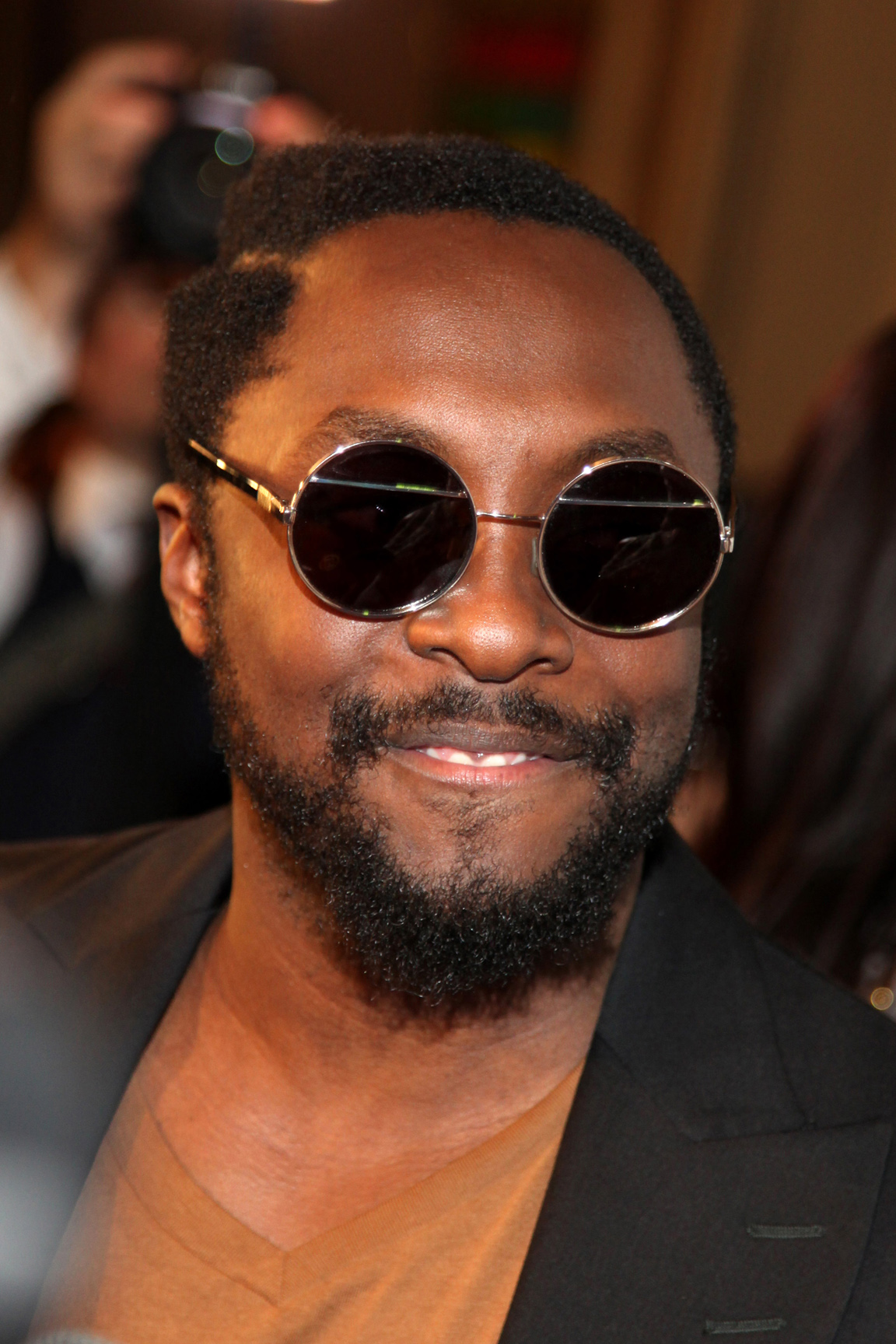
will.i.am

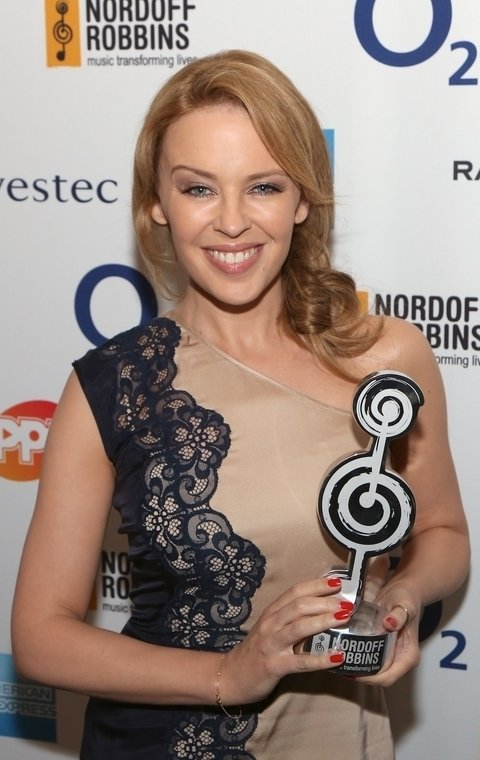
Kylie Minogue

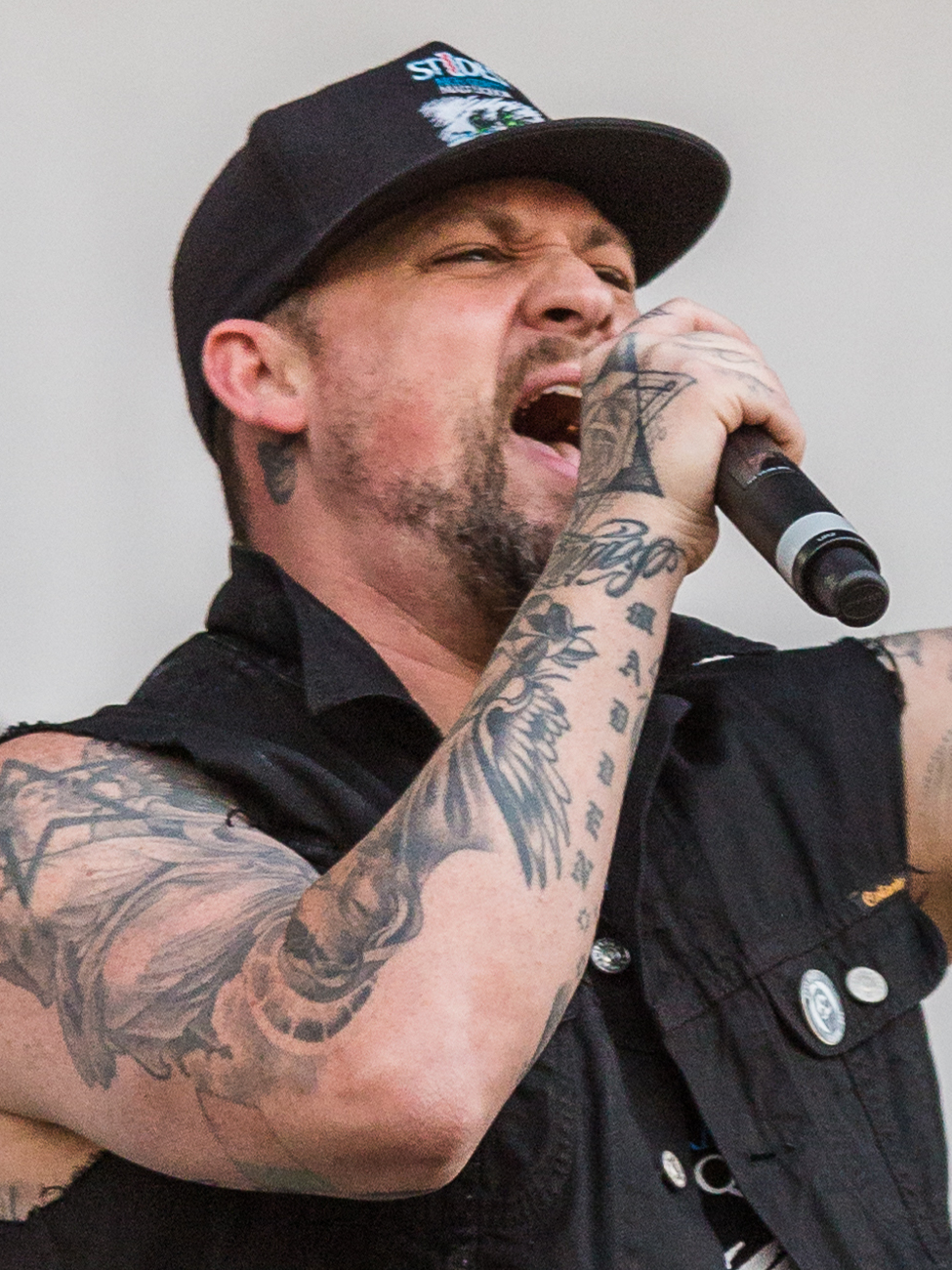
Joel Madden

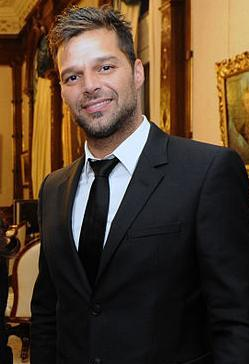
Ricky Martin

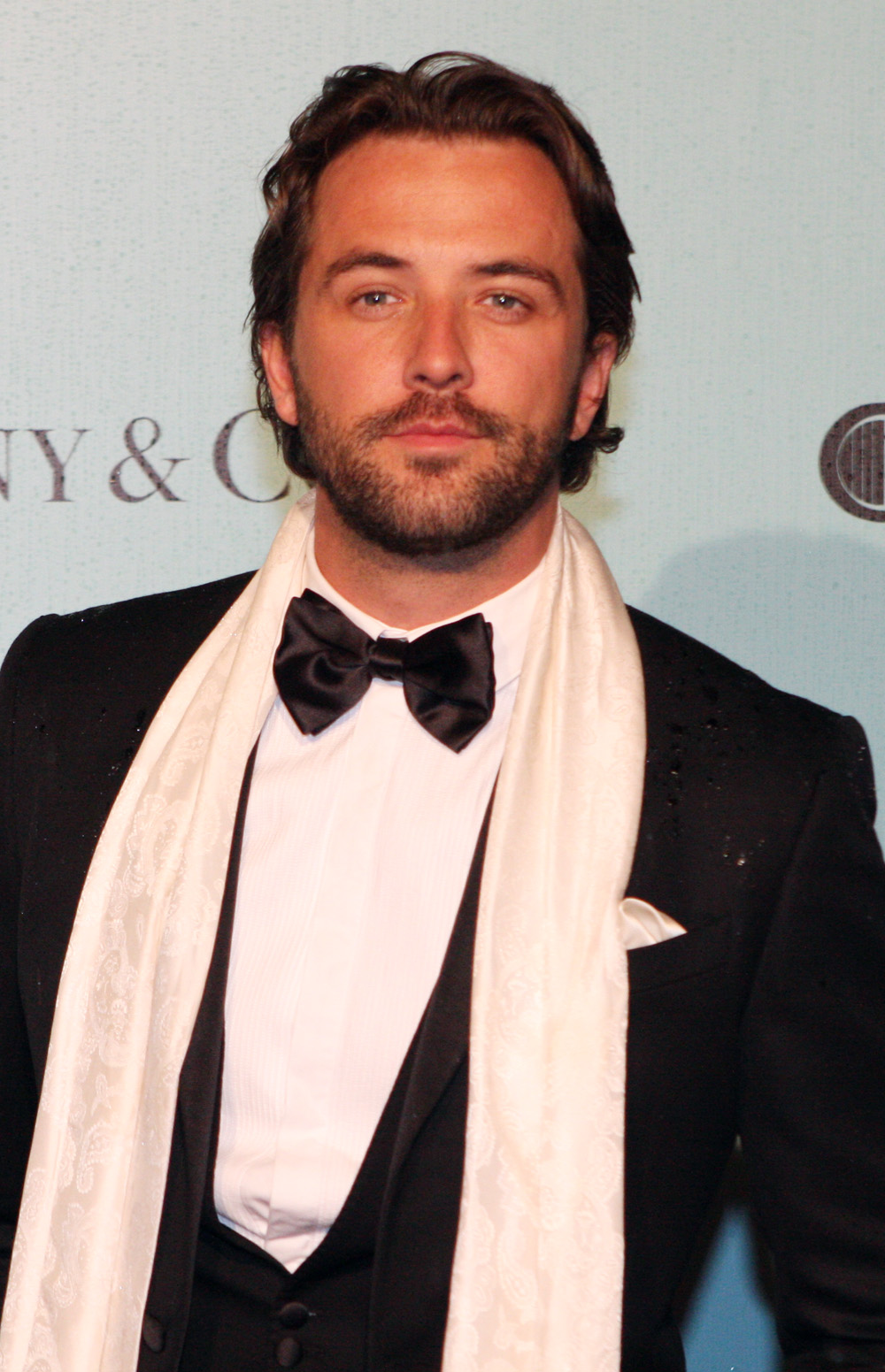
Darren McMullen

== Teams ==
Color key

- Winner
- Runner-up
- Third place
- Fourth place
- Eliminated in the Live shows
- Eliminated in Sing-off Rounds
- Eliminated in Showdown Rounds
- Artist was saved at the Battle rounds
- Eliminated in the Battle rounds

Coach	Top 56			
will.i.am				
will.i.am	Anja Nissen	ZK	Gabriel & Cecilia	Mat Verevis
will.i.am	Jacob Lee	Julian Simonsz	Chita Henneberry	Louise van Veenendaal
will.i.am	Carly Yelayotis	~~Soli Tesema~~	~~Jhoanna Aguila~~	Emily Rex
will.i.am	Tasha Amoroso	Jayde Grey	Sarah Hamad	Krishool
Kylie Minogue				
Kylie Minogue	Johnny Rollins	Kat Jade	Robbie Balmer	John Lingard
Kylie Minogue	Megan Longhurst	Lionel Cole	Rosie Henshaw	Jhoanna Aguila
Kylie Minogue	Candice Skjonnemand	~~Thando Sikwila~~	~~Jackson Thomas~~	Brittanie Shipway
Kylie Minogue	Reece & Tino	Maybelle Galuvao	Tom Oliver	Hayley Jensen
Joel Madden				
Joel Madden	Frank Lakoudis	Holly Tapp	Isaac McGovern	Taila Gouge
Joel Madden	Laura-Leigh Smith	Soli Tesema	Doug Williams	Jess Berney
Joel Madden	Blake Leggett	Lij Gilmour	Elise Baker	Luke Koteras
Joel Madden	Harry Healy	Annabelle Eve	Dallas James	Courtney Hale
Ricky Martin				
Ricky Martin	Jackson Thomas	Sabrina Batshon	Elly Oh	C Major
Ricky Martin	Fely Irvine	Thando Sikwila	Josh McDonald	Brandon Duff
Ricky Martin	Matthew Garwood	~~Carly Yelayotis~~	~~Lionel Cole~~	~~Gabriel & Cecilia~~
Ricky Martin	~~Jess Berney~~	Peter White	Scotty Gelzinnis	Mia Morrissey
Saved artists are italicized.

== Blind auditions ==
Color key

✔	Coach hit his/her "I WANT YOU" button
	Artist defaulted to this coach's team
	Artist elected to join this coach's team
	Artist eliminated with no coach pressing their "I WANT YOU" button
	Artist received an 'All Turn'.

=== Episode 1 (4 May) ===
The first episode of the Blind Auditions was broadcast on 4 May 2014. The coaches performed a cover of "Hall of Fame" together at the start of the show.

Order	Artist	Song	Coaches and artists choices			
Order	Artist	Song	Will	Kylie	Joel	Ricky
1	Kat Jade	"Wrecking Ball"	—	✔	✔	—
2	Mat Verevis	"New York State of Mind"	✔	✔	✔	✔
3	Frank Lakoudis	"Immigrant Song"	—	✔	✔	✔
4	Anja Nissen	"Vanishing"	✔	✔	✔	✔
5	Lionel Cole	"Unforgettable"	—	✔	—	✔
6	Rosemaree Dinaro	"Can't Fight the Moonlight"	—	—	—	—
7	C Major	"Crazy in Love"	✔	✔	✔	✔

=== Episode 2 (5 May) ===
Order	Artist	Song	Coaches and artists choices			
Order	Artist	Song	Will	Kylie	Joel	Ricky
1	Louise van Veenendaal	"Somebody to Love"	✔	—	✔	—
2	Lij Gilmour	"Teenage Dirtbag"	—	—	✔	✔
3	Emily Rex	"Pure Imagination"	✔	✔	✔	—
4	Krishool	"OMG"	✔	—	—	—
5	Luke Koteras	"The A Team"	—	✔	✔	—
6	Lauren Valentine	"Anything Could Happen"	—	—	—	—
7	Robbie Balmer	"I Can't Make You Love Me"	—	✔	✔	✔
8	Elly Oh	"Mamma Knows Best"	✔	✔	✔	✔

=== Episode 3 (6 May) ===
Order	Artist	Song	Coaches and artists choices			
Order	Artist	Song	Will	Kylie	Joel	Ricky
1	Reece & Tino	"No Diggity"	—	✔	—	—
2	Brittanie Shipway	"On My Own"	✔	✔	✔	✔
3	Aaron James	"I Will Always Love You"	—	—	—	—
4	Phineas Hartson	"My Baby Just Cares for Me"	—	—	—	—
5	Scotty Gelzinnis	"Nature Boy"	—	—	✔	✔
6	India Jade	"I'm Kissing You"	—	—	—	—
7	Jhoanna Aguila	"You've Got the Love"	✔	✔	✔	—
8	Harry Healy	"Romeo and Juliet"	✔	✔	✔	—
9	Johnny Rollins	"Beneath Your Beautiful"	—	✔	—	—
10	Candice Skjonnemand	"Turning Tables"	✔	✔	—	✔

=== Episode 4 (7 May) ===
Order	Artist	Song	Coaches and artists choices			
Order	Artist	Song	Will	Kylie	Joel	Ricky
1	Isaac McGovern	"I Need a Dollar"	✔	✔	✔	✔
2	Fely Irvine	"We Found Love"	—	—	✔	✔
3	Samantha Clark	"Fool in Love"	—	—	—	—
4	Dallas James	"Bring It On Home to Me"	—	✔	✔	—
5	Hayley Jensen	"Freefallin"	✔	✔	—	—
6	Chita Henneberry	"I Want You Back"	✔	—	✔	—
7	Jasmin Schlage	"Sober"	—	—	—	—
8	Nathan Lamont	"Once in a Lifetime"	—	—	—	—
9	Holly Tapp	"That's It, I Quit, I'm Movin' On"	✔	✔	✔	—

=== Episode 5 (11 May) ===
Order	Artist	Song	Coaches and artists choices			
Order	Artist	Song	Will	Kylie	Joel	Ricky
1	Carly Yelayotis	"Stay"	—	✔	✔	✔
2	Brandon Duff	"Skinny Love"	—	—	—	✔
3	Taila Gouge	"Stuck Like Glue"	—	—	✔	—
4	Jacob Lee	"Battle Scars"	✔	—	—	—
5	Gabriel & Cecilia	"Laura Palmer"	—	—	✔	✔
6	Keely Brittain	"Love Story"	—	—	—	—
7	Tom Oliver	"Keep Your Head Up"	—	✔	—	—
8	Jess Berney	"Pie Jesu"	✔	✔	✔	✔

=== Episode 6 (12 May) ===
Order	Artist	Song	Coaches and artists choices			
Order	Artist	Song	Will	Kylie	Joel	Ricky
1	Sabrina Batshon	"Power Of Love"	—	✔	✔	✔
2	Doug Williams	"Love The One You're With"	—	✔	✔	✔
3	Scott Kociuruba	"Runaway"	—	—	—	—
4	Lucie M	"Nobody's Perfect"	—	—	—	—
5	Rosie Henshaw	"Sing It Back"	—	✔	✔	✔
6	Beth Anderson	"Times Like These"	—	—	—	—
7	Jayde Grey	"Free Fallin'"	✔	✔	✔	—
8	ZK	"As Long As You Love Me"	✔	—	—	—

=== Episode 7 (13 May) ===
Order	Artist	Song	Coaches and artists choices			
Order	Artist	Song	Will	Kylie	Joel	Ricky
1	DivaLicious	"The Flower Duet"	—	—	—	—
2	John Lingard	"Riptide"	✔	✔	✔	—
3	Tasha Amoroso	"Ho Hey"	✔	✔	✔	✔
4	Thando Sikwila	"Mercy"	—	✔	✔	—
5	Annabelle Eve	"The One That Got Away"	—	✔	✔	—
6	Andrew Taylor	"Yellow"	—	—	—	—
7	Sarah Hamad	"Good Luck"	✔	—	—	—
8	Luna Envy	"My Immortal"	—	—	—	—
9	Peter White	"Sweet Disposition"	—	✔	✔	✔

=== Episode 8 (18 May) ===
Order	Artist	Song	Coaches and artists choices			
Order	Artist	Song	Will	Kylie	Joel	Ricky
1	Tahlia Tabone	"Think"	—	—	—	—
2	Josh McDonald	"The Blower's Daughter"	—	—	✔	✔
3	Maybelle Galuvao	"Gravity"	—	✔	—	—
4	Rachel Giusti	"You And I"	—	—	—	—
5	Nick McClure	"Naïve"	—	—	—	—
6	Mia Morrissey	"True Colors"	—	—	—	✔
7	Nicole Martini	"Caruso"	—	—	—	—
8	Blake Leggett	"Fall At Your Feet"	—	—	✔	—
9	Julian Simonsz	"Suit & Tie"	✔	✔	✔	✔

=== Episode 9 (19 May) ===
Order	Artist	Song	Coaches and artists choices			
Order	Artist	Song	Will	Kylie	Joel	Ricky
1	Brodi Owen	"I Write Sins Not Tragedies"	—	—	—	—
2	Laura-Leigh Smith	"Reflection"	—	—	✔	—
3	Jackson Thomas	"Royals"	—	✔	—	—
4	Kylie Stephens	"So Far Away"	—	—	—	—
5	Courtney Hale	"Toxic"	—	✔	✔	—
6	Nyssa Berger	"Feels Like Home"	—	—	—	—
7	Scottie Paulo	"Treasure"	—	—	—	—
8	Steven Rossitto	"Old Man River"	—	—	—	—
9	Matthew Garwood	"All I Ask of You"	—	—	—	✔

=== Episode 10 (20 May) ===
Order	Artist	Song	Coaches and artists choices			
Order	Artist	Song	Will	Kylie	Joel	Ricky
1	Cais Dillon	"Nessun Dorma"	—	—	—	Team Full
2	Charne Louise	"Born This Way"	—	—	—	Team Full
3	Megan Longhurst	"Don't Cry Out Loud"	—	✔	✔	Team Full
4	Elise Baker	"Safe And Sound"	✔	—N/a	✔	Team Full
5	Sarsha Simone	"No More Drama"	—	—N/a	—N/a	Team Full
6	Soli Tesema	"Halo"	✔	—N/a	—N/a	Team Full

== Battle rounds ==
– Contestant wins battle round/advances to showdown
– Contestant loses battle round but gets saved/advances
– Contestant loses battle round and is eliminated

=== Episode 11 (25 May) ===
The first episode of the Battle Rounds was broadcast on 25 May 2014. The coaches performed a cover of "Warrior" together at the start of the show.

Episode/ Order	Coach	Winner	Song	Loser	'Save' result			
Episode/ Order	Coach	Winner	Song	Loser	Will	Kylie	Joel	Ricky
1.1	Kylie Minogue	Johnny Rollins	"Rolling in the Deep"	Maybelle Galuvao	—	—N/a	—	—
1.2	Ricky Martin	Fely Irvine	"Young and Beautiful"	Mia Morrissey	—	—	—	—N/a
1.3	will.i.am	Julian Simonsz	"Superstition"	Krishool	—N/a	—	—	—
1.4	Kylie Minogue	Robbie Balmer	"Strong"	Jackson Thomas	—	—N/a	—	✔
1.5	Joel Madden	Holly Tapp	"Addicted to You"	Courtney Hale	—	—	—N/a	—
1.6	Ricky Martin	Elly Oh	"O Mio Babbino Caro"	Jess Berney	✔	—	✔	—N/a

=== Episode 12 (26 May) ===
The second episode of the Battle Rounds was broadcast on 26 May 2014.

Episode/ Order	Coach	Winner	Song	Loser	'Save' result			
Episode/ Order	Coach	Winner	Song	Loser	Will	Kylie	Joel	Ricky
2.1	will.i.am	Anja Nissen	"When Love Takes Over"	Sarah Hamad	—N/a	—	—	—
2.2	Joel Madden	Doug Williams	"Hey Brother"	Dallas James	—	—	—N/a	—
2.3	Kylie Minogue	Candice Skjonnemand	"Clown"	Thando Sikwila	—	—N/a	—	✔
2.4	Ricky Martin	Brandon Duff	"Demons"	Gabriel & Cecilia	✔	—	—	—N/a
2.5	Ricky Martin	Josh McDonald	"High and Dry"	Scotty Gelzinnis	—	—	—	—N/a
2.6	Joel Madden	Talia Gouge	"The Climb"	Annabelle Eve	—	—	—N/a	—N/a
2.7	will.i.am	Louise Van Veenendaal	"Since U Been Gone"	Jayde Grey	—N/a	—	—	—N/a

=== Episode 13 (1 June) ===
The third episode of the Battle Rounds was broadcast on 1 June 2014.

- Guest Keith Urban ("Shame")

Episode/ Order	Coach	Winner	Song	Loser	'Save' result			
Episode/ Order	Coach	Winner	Song	Loser	Will	Kylie	Joel	Ricky
3.1	Kylie Minogue	John Lingard	"Counting Stars"	Tom Oliver	—	—N/a	—	—N/a
3.2	Ricky Martin	Sabrina Batshon	"Beauty and the Beast"	Lionel Cole	✔	✔	✔	—N/a
3.3	Joel Madden	Frank Lakoudis	"Under the Bridge"	Harry Healy	—	—	—N/a	—N/a
3.4	Ricky Martin	C Major	"Where Have You Been"	Carly Yelayotis	✔	—	—	—N/a
3.5	will.i.am	ZK	"The Cave"	Tasha Amoroso	—N/a	—	—	—N/a
3.6	Kylie Minogue	Kat Jade	"Roar"	Hayley Jensen	—N/a	—N/a	—	—N/a

=== Episode 14 (2 June) ===
The fourth episode of the Battle Rounds was broadcast on 2 June 2014.

Episode/ Order	Coach	Winner	Song	Loser	'Save' result			
Episode/ Order	Coach	Winner	Song	Loser	Will	Kylie	Joel	Ricky
4.1	Kylie Minogue	Megan Longhurst	"I Know Him So Well"	Brittanie Shipway	—N/a	—N/a	—	—N/a
4.2	Joel Madden	Isaac McGovern	"Reckless"	Luke Koteras	—N/a	—	—N/a	—N/a
4.3	will.i.am	Jacob Lee	"You Make It Real"	Jhoanna Aguila	—N/a	✔	✔	—N/a
4.4	Kylie Minogue	Rosie Henshaw	"Umbrella"	Reece & Tino	—N/a	—N/a	—	—N/a
4.5	Joel Madden	Blake Leggett	"Good Riddance (Time of Your Life)"	Lij Gilmour	—N/a	—N/a	—N/a	—N/a
4.6	Joel Madden	Laura-Leigh Smith	"Burn"	Elise Baker	—N/a	—N/a	—N/a	—N/a
4.7	will.i.am	Mat Verevis	"Ordinary People"	Soli Tesema	—N/a	—N/a	✔	—N/a
4.8	will.i.am	Chita Henneberry	"Clarity"	Emily Rex	—N/a	—N/a	—N/a	—N/a
4.9	Ricky Martin	Matthew Garwood	"Eleanor Rigby"	Peter White	—N/a	—N/a	—N/a	—N/a

== Showdown rounds ==
– Contestant was sent to the Live Finals
– Contestant was sent to the Sing Off
– Contestant was instantly eliminated

=== Episode 15 (8 June) ===
The first episode of the Showdowns was broadcast on 8 June 2014.

Order	Coach	Contestant	Song	Result
1.1	Ricky Martin	C Major	"Blurred Lines"	Live Finals
1.2	Ricky Martin	Thando Sikwila	"Sex On Fire"	Sing-Off
1.3	Ricky Martin	Matthew Garwood	"Mama"	Eliminated
1.4	will.i.am	Gabriel & Cecilia	"Titanium"	Live Finals
1.5	will.i.am	Julian Simonsz	"Classic"	Sing-Off
1.6	will.i.am	Carly Yelayotis	"Un-Break My Heart"	Eliminated
1.7	Kylie Minogue	Candice Skjonnemand	"Unconditionally"	Eliminated
1.8	Kylie Minogue	Lionel Cole	"Georgia On My Mind"	Sing-Off
1.9	Kylie Minogue	John Lingard	"I Will Follow You Into The Dark"	Live Finals
1.10	Joel Madden	Soli Tesema	"Free"	Sing-Off
1.11	Joel Madden	Blake Leggett	"Pompeii"	Eliminated
1.12	Joel Madden	Frank Lakoudis	"Keep The Faith"	Live Finals

=== Episode 16 (9 June) ===
The second episode of the Showdowns was broadcast on 9 June 2014.

Order	Coach	Contestant	Song	Result
2.1	will.i.am	Anja Nissen	"His Eye Is on the Sparrow"	Live Finals
2.2	will.i.am	Jacob Lee	"Story of My Life"	Sing-Off
2.3	will.i.am	Louise Van Veenendaal	"I've Got the Music in Me"	Eliminated
2.4	Ricky Martin	Fely Irvine	"Hit 'Em Up Style (Oops!)"	Sing-Off
2.5	Ricky Martin	Brandon Duff	"Breakeven"	Eliminated
2.6	Ricky Martin	Jackson Thomas	"Resolution"	Live Finals
2.7	Joel Madden	Laura-Leigh Smith	"The Voice Within"	Sing-Off
2.8	Joel Madden	Isaac McGovern	"Tennis Court"	Live Finals
2.9	Joel Madden	Jess Berney	"Anytime You Need a Friend"	Eliminated
2.10	Kylie Minogue	Jhoanna Aguila	"Fallin'"	Eliminated
2.11	Kylie Minogue	Robbie Balmer	"Burn For You"	Sing-Off
2.12	Kylie Minogue	Kat Jade	"Still Into You"	Live Finals

=== Episode 17 (15 June) ===
The third episode of the Showdowns was broadcast on 15 June 2014.

Order	Coach	Contestant	Song	Result
3.1	will.i.am	Mat Verevis	"All in Love Is Fair"	Sing Off
3.2	will.i.am	Chita Henneberry	"Girl on Fire"	Eliminated
3.3	will.i.am	ZK	"Say Something"	Live Finals
3.4	Kylie Minogue	Megan Longhurst	"Wind Beneath My Wings"	Sing-Off
3.5	Kylie Minogue	Rosie Henshaw	"Shake Your Body (Down to the Ground)"	Eliminated
3.6	Kylie Minogue	Johnny Rollins	"All Of Me"	Live Finals
3.7	Joel Madden	Holly Tapp	"Sunday Morning"	Sing-Off
3.8	Joel Madden	Doug Williams	"The Way We Were"	Eliminated
3.9	Joel Madden	Talia Gouge	"Redneck Woman"	Live Finals
3.10	Ricky Martin	Sabrina Batshon	"Queen Of The Night"	Live Finals
3.11	Ricky Martin	Josh McDonald	"Wake Me Up"	Eliminated
3.12	Ricky Martin	Elly Oh	"Let It Go"	Sing-Off

=== Episode 18 (16 June) ===
The Sing Off episode, where the remaining contestants did a reprise of their audition pieces, was broadcast on 16 June 2014.

– Contestant was sent to the Live Finals
– Contestant was eliminated

Order	Coach	Contestant	Song	Result
4.1	Ricky Martin	Elly Oh	"Mamma Knows Best"	Live Finals
4.2	Ricky Martin	Fely Irvine	"We Found Love"	Eliminated
4.3	Ricky Martin	Thando Sikwila	"Mercy"	Eliminated
4.4	will.i.am	Jacob Lee	"Battle Scars"	Eliminated
4.5	will.i.am	Mat Verevis	"New York State of Mind"	Live Finals
4.6	will.i.am	Julian Simonsz	"Suit and Tie"	Eliminated
4.7	Joel Madden	Laura-Leigh Smith	"Reflection"	Eliminated
4.8	Joel Madden	Holly Tapp	"That's It, I Quit, I'm Movin' On"	Live Finals
4.9	Joel Madden	Soli Tesema	"Halo"	Eliminated
4.10	Kylie Minogue	Megan Longhurst	"Don't Cry Out Loud"	Eliminated
4.11	Kylie Minogue	Robbie Balmer	"I Can't Make You Love Me"	Live Finals
4.12	Kylie Minogue	Lionel Cole	"Unforgettable"	Eliminated

== Live shows ==
=== Episode 19 (23 June) ===
The first episode of the Live shows was broadcast on 23 June 2014. As for the results, there were no eliminations.

- Performances from Coldplay "A Sky Full of Stars" and "Magic" from their new album Ghost Stories
- Sabrina Batshon's rendition of Chandelier entered the ARIA charts at No. 39 this week.

Order	Coach	Contestant	Song	Result
1	will.i.am	Anja Nissen	"I'll Be There"	Bottom two
2	will.i.am	Mat Verevis	"Fine China"	Bottom two
3	will.i.am	ZK	"With Or Without You"	Saved by Public
4	will.i.am	Gabriel & Cecilia	"Walking on a Dream"	Saved by Coach
5	Kylie Minogue	Johnny Rollins	"Happy"	Saved by Coach
6	Kylie Minogue	John Lingard	"Babylon"	Bottom two
7	Kylie Minogue	Kat Jade	"Brave"	Saved by Public
8	Kylie Minogue	Robbie Balmer	"By My Side"	Bottom two
9	Joel Madden	Isaac McGovern	"Best Day of My Life"	Bottom two
10	Joel Madden	Holly Tapp	"Bang Bang (My Baby Shot Me Down)"	Saved by Public
11	Joel Madden	Frank Lakoudis	"I Was Made for Lovin' You"	Saved by Coach
12	Joel Madden	Talia Gouge	"Who Knew"	Bottom two
13	Ricky Martin	Elly Oh	"If I Ain't Got You"	Bottom two
14	Ricky Martin	Jackson Thomas	"This Is What It Feels Like"	Saved by Coach
15	Ricky Martin	Sabrina Batshon	"Chandelier"	Saved by Public
16	Ricky Martin	C Major	"Sing"	Bottom two

=== Episode 20 (30 June) ===
The second episode of the Live shows was broadcast on 30 June 2014.

- Performance from Kylie Minogue with her songs Sexy Love and Love at First Sight.
- Gabriel & Cecilia and ZK's performances both achieved the respective ARIA chart positions of No. 40 and No. 46.

Order	Coach	Contestant	Song	Public Vote Result	Instant Save Result
1	Kylie Minogue	Johnny Rollins	"Am I Wrong"	—N/a	—N/a
2	Kylie Minogue	Robbie Balmer	"The Scientist"	Not Saved	Instant Save
3	Kylie Minogue	John Lingard	"Hand on Your Heart"	Not Saved	Eliminated
4	Kylie Minogue	Kat Jade	"Dark Horse"	Saved by Public	—N/a
5	Joel Madden	Frank Lakoudis	"American Woman"	—N/a	—N/a
6	Joel Madden	Isaac McGovern	"Iris"	Not Saved	Instant Save
7	Joel Madden	Talia Gouge	"Ain't It Fun"	Not Saved	Eliminated
8	Joel Madden	Holly Tapp	"Single Ladies (Put a Ring on It)"	Saved by Public	—N/a
9	will.i.am	Gabriel & Cecilia	"I Dreamed a Dream"	—N/a	—N/a
10	will.i.am	Mat Verevis	"Rocket Man"	Not Saved	Eliminated
11	will.i.am	Anja Nissen	"Irreplaceable"	Not Saved	Instant Save
12	will.i.am	ZK	"Imagine"	Saved by Public	—N/a
13	Ricky Martin	Jackson Thomas	"Kiss from a Rose"	—N/a	—N/a
14	Ricky Martin	C Major	"Señorita"	Not Saved	Eliminated
15	Ricky Martin	Elly Oh	"Mama Do (Uh Oh, Uh Oh)"	Not Saved	Instant Save
16	Ricky Martin	Sabrina Batshon	"Empire"	Saved by Public	—N/a

=== Episode 21 (7 July) ===
The third episode of the Live shows was broadcast on 7 July 2014.

- Guest performance from The Madden Brothers with the song "We Are Done".
- ZK and Johnny Rollins performances all achieved the respective ARIA chart positions of No. 35 and No. 50.

Order	Coach	Contestant	Song	Public Vote Result	Instant Save Result
1	Ricky Martin	Sabrina Batshon	"Spectrum (Say My Name)"	Saved by Public	—N/a
2	Ricky Martin	Elly Oh	"Never Be the Same"	Not Saved	Eliminated
3	Ricky Martin	Jackson Thomas	"Bridge over Troubled Water"	Not Saved	Instant Save
4	Kylie Minogue	Kat Jade	"Telephone"	Saved by Public	—N/a
5	Kylie Minogue	Robbie Balmer	"Love Lost"	Not Saved	Eliminated
6	Kylie Minogue	Johnny Rollins	"Stay With Me"	Not Saved	Instant Save
7	Joel Madden	Holly Tapp	"Lovefool"	Saved by Public	—N/a
8	Joel Madden	Isaac McGovern	"Geronimo"	Not Saved	Eliminated
9	Joel Madden	Frank Lakoudis	"We Are the Champions"	Not Saved	Instant Save
10	will.i.am	ZK	"Time After Time"	Saved by Public	—N/a
11	will.i.am	Gabriel & Cecilia	"Smells Like Teen Spirit"	Not Saved	Eliminated
12	will.i.am	Anja Nissen	"Wild"	Not Saved	Instant Save

=== Episode 22 (14 July) ===
The fourth episode of the Live shows was broadcast on 14 July 2014.

- Performance from Ricky Martin with the song "Vida"
- Johnny Rollins's rendition of "When a Man Loves a Woman" entered the ARIA charts at No. 38

Order	Coach	Contestant	Song	Public Vote Result	Wildcard Result
1	Ricky Martin	Jackson Thomas	"When the War Is Over"	Saved by Public	—N/a
2	Ricky Martin	Sabrina Batshon	"Who You Are"	Not Saved	Eliminated
3	Joel Madden	Frank Lakoudis	"Sweet Child O' Mine"	Saved by Public	—N/a
4	Joel Madden	Holly Tapp	"You Know I'm No Good"	Not Saved	Eliminated
5	Kylie Minogue	Kat Jade	"Memory"	Not Saved	Eliminated
6	Kylie Minogue	Johnny Rollins	"When a Man Loves a Woman"	Saved by Public	—N/a
7	Will.i.am	Anja Nissen	"I Have Nothing"	Not Saved	Wildcard
8	Will.i.am	ZK	"Don't Stop Believing"	Saved by Public	—N/a

Group Performances
Order	Performer	Song
1	Kat Jade & Johnny Rollins	"Kids"
2	Jackson Thomas & Sabrina Batshon	"Total Eclipse of the Heart"
3	ZK & Anja Nissen	"Somebody That I Used to Know"
4	Holly Tapp & Frank Lakoudis	"House of the Rising Sun"
5	Top 8 with contestants from The Voice Kids	"On Top of the World"

=== Episode 23 (21 July) ===
The fifth episode of the Live shows was broadcast on 21 July 2014. Guest Performances By: will.i.am & Cody Wise "It's My Birthday" and Sheppard "Geronimo".

Order	Coach	Contestant	Duet Song	Duet with	Result
1	Kylie Minogue	Johnny Rollins	"Can't Get You Out of My Head"	Kylie Minogue	Saved
2	Will.i.am	Anja Nissen	"Where Is the Love?"	Will.i.am	Saved
2	Will.i.am	ZK	"Where Is the Love?"	Will.i.am	Fourth place
3	Joel Madden	Frank Lakoudis	"Radioactive"	Joel Madden	Fourth place
4	Ricky Martin	Jackson Thomas	"Every Breath You Take"	Ricky Martin	Saved
Top 3 performances
Order	Coach	Contestant	Song		Result
1	Ricky Martin	Jackson Thomas	"Resolution"		Runner-up
2	Will.i.am	Anja Nissen	"When Love Takes Over"		Winner
3	Kylie Minogue	Johnny Rollins	"Beneath Your Beautiful"		Third place

Group Performances
Order	Performer	Song
1	Coaches and Top 16	"The Real Thing"

== Results summary ==
Color key

Winner
Runner-up
3rd place
4th place
Artist was chosen by the public to go through
Artist was chosen by the coach to go through
Artist did not perform that week
Artist was saved by the Instant Save (via Twitter)
Artist was sent to the lives
Artist was in the bottom 2 or 3
Artist won the wildcard
Artist moved to different team due to steal

=== Team Will ===
Artist	Battles	Showdown	Sing-Off	Live shows				Live Finale	
Artist	Battles	Showdown	Sing-Off	Week 1	Week 2	Week 3	Week 4	Round 1	Round 2
Anja Nissen	Advanced	Advanced	—	Bottom 2	Advanced	Advanced	Advanced	Advanced	Winner
ZK	Advanced	Advanced	—	Advanced	Advanced	Advanced	Advanced	4th place	Eliminated (Finals part 1)
Gabriel & Cecilia	Team Ricky	Advanced	—	Advanced	Advanced	Bottom 2	Eliminated (Live Show 3)		
Mat Verevis	Advanced	Sing off	Advanced	Bottom 2	Bottom 2	Eliminated (Live Show 2)			
Jacob Lee	Advanced	Sing off	Bottom 3	Eliminated (Sing-Offs)					
Julian Simonz	Advanced	Sing off	Bottom 3	Eliminated (Sing-Offs)					
Chita Henneberry	Advanced	Eliminated (Showdown)							
Louise Van Veenendaal	Advanced	Eliminated (Showdown)							
Carly Yelayotis	Team Ricky	Eliminated (Showdown)							
Soli Tesema	Advanced	Team Joel							
Jhoanna Aguila	Advanced	Team Kylie							
Emily Rex	Eliminated (Battles)								
Tasha Amoroso	Eliminated (Battles)								
Jayde Grey	Eliminated (Battles)								
Sarah Hamad	Eliminated (Battles)								
Krishool	Eliminated (Battles)								

=== Team Kylie ===
Artist	Battles	Showdown	Sing-Off	Live shows				Live Finale	
Artist	Battles	Showdown	Sing-Off	Week 1	Week 2	Week 3	Week 4	Round 1	Round 2
Johnny Rollins	Advanced	Advanced	—	Advanced	Advanced	Advanced	Advanced	Advanced	3rd place
Kat Jade	Advanced	Advanced	—	Advanced	Advanced	Advanced	did not advance	Eliminated (Semi-finals)	
Robbie Balmer	Advanced	Sing off	Advanced	Bottom 2	Advanced	Bottom 2	Eliminated (Live Show 3)		
John Lingard	Advanced	Advanced	—	Bottom 2	Bottom 2	Eliminated (Live Show 2)			
Lionel Cole	Team Ricky	Sing off	Bottom 3	Eliminated (Sing-Offs)					
Megan Longhurst	Advanced	Sing off	Bottom 3	Eliminated (Sing-Offs)					
Rosie henshaw	Advanced	Eliminated (Showdown)							
Jhoanna Aguila	Team Will	Eliminated (Showdown)							
Candice Skjonnemand	Advanced	Eliminated (Showdown)							
Thando Sikwila	Advanced	Team Ricky							
Jackson Thomas	Advanced	Team Ricky							
Reece & Tino	Eliminated (Battles)								
Brittanie Shipway	Eliminated (Battles)								
Hayley Jensen	Eliminated (Battles)								
Tom Oliver	Eliminated (Battles)								
Maybelle Galuvao	Eliminated (Battles)								

=== Team Joel ===
Artist	Battles	Showdown	Sing-Off	Live shows				Live Finale	
Artist	Battles	Showdown	Sing-Off	Week 1	Week 2	Week 3	Week 4	Round 1	Round 2
Frank Lakoudis	Advanced	Advanced	—	Advanced	Advanced	Advanced	Advanced	4th place	Eliminated (Live Finals 1)
Holly Tapp	Advanced	Sing off	Advanced	Advanced	Advanced	Advanced	did not advance	Eliminated (Semi-finals)	
Isaac McGovern	Advanced	Advanced	—	Bottom 2	Advanced	Bottom 2	Eliminated (Live Show 3)		
Talia Gouge	Advanced	Advanced	—	Bottom 2	Bottom 2	Eliminated (Live Show 2)			
Soli Tesema	Team Will	Sing off	Bottom 3	Eliminated (Sing-Offs)					
Laura-Leigh Smith	Advanced	Sing off	Bottom 3	Eliminated (Sing-Offs)					
Doug Williams	Advanced	Eliminated (Showdown)							
Jess Berney	Team Ricky	Eliminated (Showdown)							
Blake Legget	Advanced	Eliminated (Showdown)							
Elise Baker	Eliminated (Battles)								
Lij Gilmour	Eliminated (Battles)								
Luke Koteras	Eliminated (Battles)								
Harry Healey	Eliminated (Battles)								
Annabelle Eve	Eliminated (Battles)								
Dallas James	Eliminated (Battles)								
Courtney Hale	Eliminated (Battles)								

=== Team Ricky ===
Artist	Battles	Showdown	Sing-Off	Live shows				Live Finale	
Artist	Battles	Showdown	Sing-Off	Week 1	Week 2	Week 3	Week 4	Round 1	Round 2
Jackson Thomas	Team Kylie	Advanced	—	Advanced	Advanced	Advanced	Advanced	Advanced	Runner-up
Sabrina Batshon	Advanced	Advanced	—	Advanced	Advanced	Advanced	did not advance	Eliminated (Semi-finals)	
Elly Oh	Advanced	Sing off	Advanced	Bottom 2	Advanced	Bottom 2	Eliminated (Live Show 3)		
C Major	Advanced	Advanced	—	Bottom 2	Bottom 2	Eliminated (Live Show 2)			
Fely Irvine	Advanced	Sing off	Bottom 3	Eliminated (Sing-Offs)					
Thando Sikwila	Team Kylie	Sing off	Bottom 3	Eliminated (Sing-Offs)					
Matthew Garwood	Advanced	Eliminated (Showdown)							
Josh Mcdonald	Advanced	Eliminated (Showdown)							
Brandon Duff	Advanced	Eliminated (Showdown)							
Carly Yelayotis	Advanced	Team Will							
Lionel Cole	Advanced	Team Kylie							
Gabriel & Cecilia	Advanced	Team Will							
Jess Berney	Advanced	Team Joel							
Peter White	Eliminated (Battles)								
Scotty Gelzinnis	Eliminated (Battles)								
Mia Morrissey	Eliminated (Battles)								

== Elimination Chart ==
=== Overall ===
Artist's info

- Artist from Team Will
- Artist from Team Kylie
- Artist from Team Joel
- Artist from Team Ricky

Result details

- Winner
- Runner-up
- Third place
- Fourth Place
- Artist was saved by the public
- Artist was saved by his/her coach
- Artist was in the bottom two but was saved
- Artist was eliminated
- Artist won the Wildcard round
- Artist was saved by Instant Save (via Twitter)

Live show results per week
Artist	Week 1	Week 2	Week 3	Semi-Finals	Finals	
Artist	Week 1	Week 2	Week 3	Semi-Finals	Round 1	Round 2
Anja Nissen	Safe	Safe	Safe	Safe	Safe	Winner
Jackson Thomas	Safe	Safe	Safe	Safe	Safe	Runner-Up
Johnny Rollins	Safe	Safe	Safe	Safe	Safe	3rd place
Frank Lakoudis	Safe	Safe	Safe	Safe	4th place	Eliminated (Finals Round 1)
ZK	Safe	Safe	Safe	Safe	4th place	Eliminated (Finals Round 1)
Holly Tapp	Safe	Safe	Safe	Eliminated	Eliminated (Semi-Finals)	
Kat Jade	Safe	Safe	Safe	Eliminated	Eliminated (Semi-Finals)	
Sabrina Batshon	Safe	Safe	Safe	Eliminated	Eliminated (Semi-Finals)	
Elly Oh	Safe	Safe	Eliminated	Eliminated (Week 3)		
Gabriel & Cecilia	Safe	Safe	Eliminated	Eliminated (Week 3)		
Isaac McGovern	Safe	Safe	Eliminated	Eliminated (Week 3)		
Robbie Balmer	Safe	Safe	Eliminated	Eliminated (Week 3)		
C Major	Safe	Eliminated	Eliminated (Week 2)			
John Lingard	Safe	Eliminated	Eliminated (Week 2)			
Mat Verevis	Safe	Eliminated	Eliminated (Week 2)			
Talia Gouge	Safe	Eliminated	Eliminated (Week 2)			

=== Team ===
Artist's info

- Artist from Team Will
- Artist from Team Kylie
- Artist from Team Joel
- Artist from Team Ricky

Result details

- Winner
- Runner-up
- Third place
- Fourth Place
- Artist was eliminated
- Artist won the Wildcard round
- Artist was saved by Instant Save (via Twitter)

Live show results per week
Artist	Live Shows				The Live Finale
Artist	Week 1	Week 2	Week 3	Week 4	The Live Finale
Anja Nissen	Advanced	Advanced	Advanced	Advanced	Winner
ZK	Advanced	Advanced	Advanced	Advanced	Fourth Place
Gabriel & Cecilia	Advanced	Advanced	Eliminated		
Mat Verevis	Advanced	Eliminated			
Johnny Rollins	Advanced	Advanced	Advanced	Advanced	Third place
Kat Jade	Advanced	Advanced	Advanced	Eliminated	
Robbie Balmer	Advanced	Advanced	Eliminated		
John Lingard	Advanced	Eliminated			
Frank Lakoudis	Advanced	Advanced	Advanced	Advanced	Fourth Place
Holly Tapp	Advanced	Advanced	Advanced	Eliminated	
Isaac McGovern	Advanced	Advanced	Eliminated		
Taila Gouge	Advanced	Eliminated			
Jackson Thomas	Advanced	Advanced	Advanced	Advanced	Runner-up
Sabrina Batshon	Advanced	Advanced	Advanced	Eliminated	
Elly Oh	Advanced	Advanced	Eliminated		
C Major	Advanced	Eliminated			

== Ratings ==
The Voice season three consolidated ratings, with metropolitan viewership and nightly position Colour key: – Highest rating during the season – Lowest rating during the season
Episode		Original airdate	Timeslot	Viewers (millions)	Night Rank	Source
1	"The Blind Auditions"	4 May 2014	Sunday 6:30 pm	2.229	#1	
2	"The Blind Auditions"	5 May 2014	Monday 7:30 pm	2.093	#1	
3	"The Blind Auditions"	6 May 2014	Tuesday 7:30 pm	2.003	#1	
4	"The Blind Auditions"	7 May 2014	Wednesday 7:30 pm	1.979	#1	
5	"The Blind Auditions"	11 May 2014	Sunday 6:30 pm	2.033	#1	
6	"The Blind Auditions"	12 May 2014	Monday 7:30 pm	1.779	#1	
7	"The Blind Auditions"	13 May 2014	Tuesday 7:30 pm	1.822	#1	
8	"The Blind Auditions"	18 May 2014	Sunday 6:30 pm	2.053	#1	
9	"The Blind Auditions"	19 May 2014	Monday 7:30 pm	1.781	#1	
10	"The Blind Auditions"	20 May 2014	Tuesday 7:30 pm	1.825	#1	
11	"The Battles"	25 May 2014	Sunday 6:30 pm	1.969	#1	
12	"The Battles"	26 May 2014	Monday 7:30 pm	1.751	#1	
13	"The Battles"	1 June 2014	Sunday 6:30 pm	1.970	#1	
14	"The Battles"	2 June 2014	Monday 7:30 pm	1.681	#2	
15	"The Showdowns"	8 June 2014	Sunday 6:30 pm	1.385	#2^{[a]}	
16	"The Showdowns"	9 June 2014	Monday 7:30 pm	1.536	#2	
17	"The Showdowns"	15 June 2014	Sunday 6:30 pm	1.630	#1	
18	"The Sing-Offs"	16 June 2014	Monday 7:30 pm	1.470	#2	
19	"Live Shows"	23 June 2014	Monday 7:30 pm	1.420	#2	
20	"Live Shows"	30 June 2014	Monday 7:30 pm	1.330	#3	
21	"Live Shows"	7 July 2014	Monday 7:30 pm	1.402	#1	
22	"Semi-Final"	14 July 2014	Monday 7:30 pm	1.334	#1	
23	"Grand Final"	21 July 2014	Monday 7:30 pm	1.727	#1	
23	"Winner Announced"	21 July 2014	Monday 7:30 pm	1.579	#2	

== Notes ==
- ^{a} "The Showdowns, Part 1" ranked behind a preview of the then-upcoming Voice Kids, which aired at the start of the episode.
