= Pickpocket (disambiguation) =

A pickpocket is a person who commits the act of pickpocketing.

Pickpocket, pickpockets or pick pocket may also refer to:

- Pickpocket (film), 1959 French film by Robert Bresson
- Pickpocket (EP), 1981 release by post-punk band Ludus
- Pickpockets (2018 film), a Colombian film
- Pickpockets (upcoming film), an upcoming Australian romantic comedy film
- Pick Pocket (1976 film), an Indian film directed by J. Sasikumar
- Pick Pocket (1989 film), an Indian film directed by G. M. Kumar
- "The Pickpocket", an episode of Strange Experiences
- Pocket Maar (disambiguation)
- Jebu Donga (disambiguation)
- Xiao Wu (transl. The Pickpocket), 1997 Chinese film
