= Pocket Maar =

Pocket Maar (lit. 'Pickpocket') may refer to these Indian films:

- Pocket Maar (1956 film), a Hindi film by Harnam Singh Rawail
- Pocket Maar (1974 film), a Hindi film by Ramesh Lakhanpal

== See also ==
- Pickpocket (disambiguation)
