= Diana in Search of Herself =

Biography of Diana, Princess of Wales

Diana in Search of Herself: Portrait of a Troubled Princess
- Author: Sally Bedell Smith
- Language: English
- Genre: Biography
- Publisher: Times Books
- Publication date: 1999
- Media type: Print
- Pages: 320
- ISBN: 0-8129-3030-4

Diana in Search of Herself: Portrait of a Troubled Princess is one of the books about Diana, Princess of Wales. The book was written by best-selling author Sally Bedell Smith and was published by the Times Books in 1999. The book is the first authoritative biography of the Princess.

== Content ==
The 320-page book focuses on the troubled life of Princess Diana. Smith interviewed nearly 150 people whose reports are used in the book to narrate the life of the Princess. These people were mainly Diana's intimates, including British tabloid journalists. The book also featured 32 pages of unseen photographs of the Princess.

The most significant claim made in the book is that the Princess had suffered from borderline personality disorder. It also claimed that she could not manage her serious eating disorder and had difficulty sustaining relationships.

== Sales ==
The book was included in the best seller lists of the following: The New York Times Book Review, The Washington Post, The Wall Street Journal, USA Today Top 50, The Boston Globe, Los Angeles Times, Newsday, Barnes & Noble and Publishers Weekly.

== Reception ==
Linda L. Richards of the January Magazine stated that the book provides an unbiased and balanced portrait of the Princess. In a similar vein, the Newsweek review of the book indicated "Smith has done a remarkable job extracting what's genuinely pertinent and interesting about Diana...If you're going to read one Diana book, this should be it."

On the other hand, the author was criticized by Dorothy Packer-Fletcher because of her claim that Diana had been experiencing borderline personality disorder. Packer-Fletcher suggested that in order to establish this diagnosis there should have been a psychiatric examination. She further argued that the author's statement was harmful because it was a "posthumous diagnosis of mental illness".

The book became a bestseller and was also cited as controversial.
