= Two Twisted =

- Genre: Drama
- Country of origin: Australia
- Original language: English
- No. of series: 1
- No. of episodes: 14

Production
- Executive producers: Bryan Brown; Sandra Levy
- Producers: Bryan Brown; Helen Watts; Karen Radzyner
- Production company: New Town Films

Original release
- Network: Nine Network
- Release: 14 August – 18 September 2006

Two Twisted is an Australian TV mystery anthology drama which premiered on the Nine Network on 14 August 2006. Narrated by Bryan Brown, who also produced the series' predecessor, Twisted Tales, each episode of the series contains two short half-hour stories, that have a twist ending. Also present in each episode is a link or connection between the two tales.

Rather than draw on a pool of experienced writers, the producers of the series issued a call to up-and-coming writers to submit screenplays. Some 2,400 entries were received and from these, 14 finalists were chosen. Directors were chosen in a similar fashion. A mix of experienced and emerging directors were chosen to shoot each episode.

Each episode was shot over a period of four days with each director given another four days to edit.

== Cast ==
- Aden Young as Patrick Dempsey
- Alex Dimitriades as Rolly
- Anthony Hayes as Julian Knox
- Anh Do as Paramedic
- Asher Keddie as Sarah
- Bill Hunter as Grandfather
- Bryan Brown as Narrator
- Craig Horner as Mase
- Daniel Wyllie as Angus Wilder
- Deborah Mailman as Jones
- Frank Gallacher as Pierce Bristow
- Garry McDonald as Norm
- Gary Waddell as Jimmy Kitchen
- Greta Scacchi as Adele Partridge
- Jacqueline McKenzie as Sarah Carmody
- John Sheerin as Mr Rogers
- Kestie Morassi as Rose
- Kick Gurry as Jenkins
- Lisa Hensley as Annabel
- Lisa McCune as Fiona Wells
- Mark Owen-Taylor as Barry
- Matt Levett as Matthew
- Melissa George as Mathilda Banks
- Peta Sergeant as Isabelle Dempsey
- Peta Wilson as Mischa Sparkle
- Roy Billing as Barber
- Sam Neill as Mick
- Sam Worthington as Gus Rogers
- Sandy Winton as Bill Banks
- Steve Bisley as Frank
- Susan Prior as Nurse Hughes
- Susie Porter as Sam
- Teo Gebert as Tate
- Tom Long as Karl Wells
- Victoria Thaine as Danielle Carmody
- Vince Colosimo as Duncan Cross
- Wendy Hughes as Barber's wife

== Episodes ==
(Episode information retrieved from Australian Television Information Archive).

No.	Title	Directed by	Written by	Original release date
1	"There's Something About Kyanna"	Kate Riedl	Peter Ivan	14 August 2006
Mathilda is an author who one day loses a sock that eventually leads to a greater mystery.
2	"Finding Frank"	Jody Dwyer	Michael Brown	14 August 2006
A security guard on his last day before retirement whose nerves not being what they used to be, has a hard time with his fellow security guard, Frank, constantly putting him on edge with pranks during the shift.
3	"Call Back"	Graeme Burfoot	Matthew Macknamara	21 August 2006
With a simple phone call Karl Wells has the opportunity to erase the past and this time save the lives of his brutally murdered wife and son. The only problem is he needs to convince his past self that he is for real. Shot over four days in Sydney, Australia in early 2006 the episode deals with regret and how we each deal with it.
4	"Heart Attack"	Rachel Ward	David Chidlow	21 August 2006
Whilst exercising, a doctor suffers a series of heart attacks. He's admitted to intensive care and placed on life support. His dead heart is removed and sent for testing. Whilst his wife waits through the night in the hospital for news, the gruesome truth about his condition emerges.
5	"Von Stauffenberg's Stamp"	Glendyn Ivin	James Robertson	28 August 2006
A genteel stamp trader, a docile barber, his rude alcoholic wife and a fabled stamp... will authentication lead to murder?
6	"A Date With Doctor D"	Paul Middleditch	Everett De Roche	28 August 2006
Rolly Schwartz thinks it's just another average morning until he discovers the nightmare lurking in his bedroom closet. His associate Sarah doesn't make anything easier.
7	"Soft Boiled Luck"	Brendan Donovan	James Robertson	4 September 2006
Two men stand accused of the same brutal murder. One is a debt ridden businessman with a track record of failed ventures, fraud and tax evasion. The other is his clone.
8	"Arkham's Curios and Wonders"	Tony D'Aquino	Tony D'Aquino	4 September 2006
Vincent lives in a decaying house with his ailing grandfather and fragile mother, Annabel. The grandfather hovers at the edge of death, seemingly at Vincent's command. As Annabel attempts to free her father from the strange spell he is under, she discovers Vincent's dark secret and the truth about herself.
9	"A Flash Exclusive"	Tim Bullock	Michael Adams	11 September 2006
A reporter for a tabloid magazine rents a room at a woman's (played by Peta Wilson) house to get the inside scoop.
10	"Delivery Man"	Kelly Schilling	Kelly Schilling	11 September 2006
A woman affected by her husband's death, refuses to leave the house. During a harsh storm, she is visited by a strange delivery man who may have more than just groceries to deliver.
11	"Jailbreak"	Nicholas Tomnay	Ian Iveson	18 September 2006
A date rapist plots to escape prison by paralysing himself and posing as a dead inmate.
12	"Saviour"	Nick Parsons	Nick Parsons	18 September 2006
A woman whose daughter is ageing rapidly due to a rare disease devotes her whole life to finding a cure. She may have found one in the blood of a mysterious prisoner, but when she applies the cure to her daughter things start to go wrong...
13	"Love Crimes"	Jennifer Kent	Michael Gillett	18 September 2006
A man invites his secretary to his house and begins to seduce her. She initially resists him, then ties him up as part of foreplay. She has to escape when he breaks free and grabs a knife, but the couple isn't really what it seems.
14	"Grand Final"	Stuart McDonald	Kelly Schilling	18 September 2006
Dan is a boy who gets visions and information from touching another person. He tries to prevent a boy from dying and inadvertently causes it himself.

== Ratings ==
Week	Viewers nationally
1	1,100,000
2	830,000
3	790,000
4	650,000
5	642,000
6	540,000

== Episode Pair Links ==
In each pair of episodes in Two Twisted, there is a link between them (Like an object or a name that's in both episode). Here are the links in each pair of episodes:

- There's Something About Kyanna & Finding Frank
  - Mid way into the first episode, the camera moves over a book titled Trespassers.
  - About the same way through the second episode, the main character Frank, looks at a picture. Behind it is the same book, Trespassers.
- Call Back & Heart Attack
  - Toward the end of the first episode, an ambulance blocks the road as it tends to a fallen bicyclist.
  - In the second, the lead male suffers a heart attack while on his bike, the same model seen in the previous episode.
- Von Stauffenberg's Stamp & A Date With Doctor D
  - In the middle of the first episode, an offer was made to buy the barbershop.
  - In the second, Rolly broke a coffee cup that had underneath it a corporate proposal to buy the barbershop in the first episode.
- Soft Boiled Luck & Arkham's Curios and Wonders
  - Near the start of the first episode, a red cube puzzle is used as "a cognitive test for the shrinks, part of the psych report".
  - In the second, the puzzle is seen in Vincent's bedroom, on a shelf, beside a plasma ball. The puzzle is never shown in clear focus during the episode, but is seen in the "Rik Bitta" segment for the week.
- A Flash Exclusive & Delivery Man
  - Man and Van which visits the first woman to deliver groceries are the same ones in the next episode.
- Jailbreak & Saviour
  - In the start of the first episode, the doctor is stitching up a man as Jenkins walks in.
  - This same man is the immortal man in the second episode.
- Love Crimes & Grand Final
  - In the start of the episode, Vince Colosimo's character sees a note on the fridge from 'Mason', stating that he will be late at basketball training.
  - In the second episode, Dan's friend is called Mase (obviously short for Mason), and plays basketball, so it's the same boy.

== See also ==
- List of Australian television series
- List of programs broadcast by Nine Network
