= Jebu Donga =

Jebu Donga (lit. 'Pickpocket') may refer to these Indian Telugu-language films:

- Jebu Donga (1975 film), action film by V. Madhusudhana Rao, starring Sobhan Babu
- Jebu Donga (1987 film)

== See also ==
- Pickpocket (disambiguation)
