= Agata the Writer =

2026 drama film

- Directed by: Kuba Dorabialski
- Written by: Kuba Dorabialski
- Produced by: Alex White
- Starring: Mia Wasikowska
- Cinematography: Kuba Dorabialski
- Edited by: Kuba Dorabialski
- Music by: Kuba Dorabialski
- Production companies: Whitefalk Films; Produktion Productions
- Release date: 6 September 2026 (Venice)
- Running time: 95 minutes
- Country: Australia
- Languages: English; Bosnian

Agata the Writer is a 2026 Australian drama film written and directed by Kuba Dorabialski in his feature directorial debut. It stars Mia Wasikowska in the title role.

The film had its world premiere in the Giornate degli Autori sidebar of the 83rd Venice International Film Festival on 6 September 2026.

== Cast ==
- Mia Wasikowska as Agata
- Vedrana Božinović as Jasmina
- Selma Alispahic as Ismeta
- Mia Morrissey as Davina
- Admir Glamočak as Vadim
- Zoran Jevtic as Malik
- Hatidža Ćorić as Fatima
- Kuba Dorabialski as Janek
- Teodora Matović as Una

== Production ==
Agata the Writer marks video artist Kuba Dorabialski's first feature, and the film's script drew on his experiences as a Polish immigrant in Australia.

The film is produced by Whitefalk Films and Produktion Productions, with Mia Wasikowska also serving as executive producer.

Interns were mostly shot in Sidney, while exteriors as well as a few interior scenes were filmed in Sarajevo; while Bosnian shootings were relatively short, there was an extended pre-production period in Bosnia to become familiar with the people and locations.

== Release ==
The film premiered in the 23rd Giornate degli Autori competition at the 83rd Venice International Film Festival. It had its national premiere at the 15th Adelaide Film Festival in October 2026.

== Reception ==
Variety's critic Guy Lodge praised the film, calling it "elegant, slippery slip of a film about writing" and a "debut of impressive poise and confidently willful storytelling instincts". Marc van de Klashorst from International Cinephile Society also lauded the film, giving it a 4/5 rating and calling it " an idiosyncratic triumph". In a less positive review, Ema Sasic from Next Best Picture noted: "It starts promisingly, with Agata facing the film’s core questions through her writing, but as it progresses, it takes a different direction that, though clever and well done, essentially runs counter to what it advocates".
