= Candice Dianna =

- Born: Candice Diana Skjonnemand; 21 October 1986 (age 40); Gold Coast, Queensland, Australia
- Genres: Pop; soul
- Occupation: Musician
- Instrument: Voice
- Years active: 2003–present

Candice Diana Skjonnemand (born 21 October 1986, Gold Coast), who also performs as Candice Dianna, is an Australian-born singer-songwriter, voice actress and record producer. In 2012 she finished second in the Karaoke World Championships, held in Lappeenranta, Finland. Skjonnemand competed on TV talent singing quest, The Voice, during season 3 (May–June 2014) for Team Kylie. Her solo five-track extended play, Becoming an Artist, was released in October 2014.

== Biography ==
Candice Skjonnemand was born in 1986 and grew up with her father Paul (died October 2014) and mother Patricia and two older siblings in the Gold Coast. She completed her secondary education at Trinity Lutheran College. She was the city champion in a state-wide talent competition, The Eistedfods, in 2003 and her name was engraved in the Gold Coast hall of fame plaque wall at the Gold Coast Arts Centre. Also in that year Skjonnemand was signed to Multiplay Music and Excalibur Productions for song writing and publishing where she worked with Sweden's Fredro and Matts B at Warner Studios, and with Adrian Newman, and Hayden Bell (producer of Savage Garden and Human Nature).

She was one half of an electronic duo, Elektra Vine, in 2011 to 2012 with Loic Mobbs: her long-time music producer and engineer. The two received attention for their works and appeared on Foxtel and Austar's program, Planet Unearthed. During her time with the duo, she was rated Highly Commended in the Electronic / Dance category at Queensland's QMusic Awards for writing their song, "So Far".

In 2012 Skjonnemand was the Australian national winner of the Karaoke World Championships and went on to place second in the world finals held in Lappeenranta, Finland. She told Natalie O'Driscoll of Blank Gold Coast magazine, "I sang at Karaoke the first time when I was probably 15... I had entered [this competition] twice before, the first time I got to the state finals and didn't even place."

From May to June 2014 she was a member of Team Kylie (Minogue) on TV talent singing competition, The Voice in season 3. Her audition singing "Turning Tables" (originally by Adele) had three judges offer to tutor her: Kylie Minogue, will.i.am and Ricky Martin. Skjonnemand gained "legions of fans" according to Liz Burke of Gold Coast Bulletin.

The Voice performances and results (2014)
| Episode | Song | Original Artist | Result |
|---|---|---|---|
| Audition | "Turning Tables" | Adele | Through to Battle rounds |
| Battle Rounds | "Clown" | Emeli Sandé | Through to Showdowns |
| Showdowns | "Unconditionally" | Katy Perry | Eliminated |

She placed in the top 36 before being eliminated in the Showdowns with her performance of "Unconditionally" (original by Katy Perry). During The Voice she performed and recorded a cover version of Emeli Sandé's single, "Clown" (January 2013), as a duet with fellow competitor, Thando Sikwila, which they issued as a single in 2014. On the back of the duet's performance, Sandé's version peaked at No. 34 on the ARIA Singles Chart in the following week – 18 months after its release.

In February 2016 she was a finalist in a song writing competition for the QMusic Awards for her track, "Mamma's Coming Home", which had been released on her solo extended play, Becoming an Artist (1 October 2014). By early 2016 she had adopted a new stage name, Candice Dianna, and told Blank Gold Coast's Samantha Morris, "Finally, we're moving again. My last name was so hard." She released a solo single, "Fall in Love with Me", in February 2018.

== Discography ==
=== Extended plays ===
| Title | Details |
|---|---|
| Becoming an Artist | Release date: October 2014; Label: Candice Dianna; Formats: DD |
