= Sally Bedell Smith =

American journalist and author

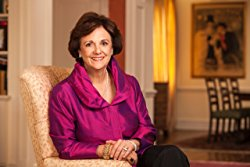
- Born: Sarah Rowbotham; May 27, 1948 (age 78); Bryn Mawr, Pennsylvania, US
- Other names: Sally Bedell, Sally Smith
- Education: B.A. Wheaton College; M.S. Columbia University Graduate School of Journalism
- Occupation: Author
- Notable work: Elizabeth the Queen: The Life of a Modern Monarch (January 2012)
- Board member of: Deerfield Academy; The Buckley School; 826DC; Columbia Journalism Review
- Spouse: Stephen G. Smith
- Children: 3
- Awards: 1982 Sigma Delta Chi Award for magazine reporting 2012 Goodreads Choice Awards for Best History & Biography 2012 Saint Nicholas Society Washington Irving Medal for Literary Excellence
- Website: www.sallybedellsmith.com

Sally Bedell Smith (born Sarah Rowbotham; May 27, 1948) is an American journalist and author. She worked as a reporter for Time, TV Guide, and The New York Times before becoming a contributing editor at Vanity Fair in 1996. She has written biographies of political, cultural, and business figures, as well as members of the British royal family. Since 2017, she has appeared as a commentator on CNN. Her 2012 biography of Queen Elizabeth II, Elizabeth the Queen, is her best-known work. She is married to Stephen G. Smith.

== Early life and education ==
Sarah Rowbotham was born in Bryn Mawr, Pennsylvania. She is the daughter of Ruth (Kirk) and James Howard Rowbotham, a brigadier general and businessman. She grew up in the nearby town of St. Davids. She graduated from Radnor High School in 1966 and was inducted into the school's Hall of Fame in November 2008. She earned her Bachelor of Arts from Wheaton College in Norton, Massachusetts, where she majored in history, and her Master of Science from Columbia University Graduate School of Journalism, where she won the Robert Sherwood Memorial Travel-Study Scholarship and the Women's Press Club of New York Award. In 2020 she was awarded a Doctor of Humane Letters (L.H.D.) by Wheaton College.

== Career ==
Smith spent her early career working as a reporter for Time, TV Guide, and The New York Times, where she was a lead cultural news reporter specializing in television.

In 1981, Smith published Up The Tube: Prime-time TV and the Silverman Years, an inside look at the American television industry, its ratings wars of the 1970s, and the meteoric career of Fred Silverman, who famously worked as an executive at all of the Big Three TV networks. She won the Sigma Delta Chi Award for magazine reporting in 1982, and became a fellow at the Freedom Forum Media Studies Center in 1986.

Smith's first major biography, In All His Glory, was published in 1990, chronicling the life of William S. Paley, former chairman of CBS. In The New York Times Book Review, Christopher Buckley praised Smith's reporting and called the book a well-balanced, thorough portrait.

In 1996, Smith published Reflected Glory: The Life of Pamela Churchill Harriman. That same year, Smith joined Vanity Fair, where she was a contributing editor. For the magazine, she wrote pieces on such high-profile figures as Jimmy Goldsmith and Gianni Agnelli.

Her 1999 biography of Diana, Princess of Wales, Diana in Search of Herself, was a New York Times bestseller. Publishers Weekly and Kirkus Reviews described the book as a serious, clinical, and unsparing psychological profile of Diana.

Smith's fourth biography, Grace and Power: The Private World of the Kennedy White House, was published in 2004 and was a New York Times bestseller. The book was reviewed by outlets including NPR and Publishers Weekly, with the magazine finding it an engaging account of the Kennedys' social world while sometimes glossing over more complex political issues.

In 2007, Smith published For Love of Politics: Bill and Hillary Clinton in the White House. Reviewing the book for The Times of London, Gerard Baker described it as portraying the Clintons' marriage as "less like a traditional marriage and more like a vast and successful corporation".

Her 2012 biography of Queen Elizabeth II, Elizabeth the Queen: The Life of a Modern Monarch, a New York Times bestseller, received the 2012 Goodreads Choice Award for Best History & Biography and the 2012 Washington Irving Medal for Literary Excellence. In The New York Times, Liesl Schillinger noted the detail and thoroughness of the biography. Smith also served as playwright Peter Morgan's consultant on the London and New York productions of The Audience, his award-winning drama about Queen Elizabeth II and her prime ministers, starring Helen Mirren.

Smith's seventh biography, Prince Charles: The Passions and Paradoxes of an Improbable Life, was published by Random House in 2017. In his review for The New York Times Book Review, William Boyd found it a sympathetic but shrewd portrait of Charles as a complex, thoughtful man not defined by his privileged upbringing. A review in Kirkus Reviews considered the work a measured, sympathetic psychological study, generous to Camilla and less so to Diana. PBS NewsHour described the book as arguing that Charles has been widely misunderstood. The book was a New York Times, Wall Street Journal, and Washington Post bestseller.

In 2023, Random House published Smith's George VI and Elizabeth: The Marriage That Saved the Monarchy, a portrait of Queen Elizabeth II's mother and father who led Britain during the Second World War. For her research, Smith was granted special access by the Queen to her parents' letters and diaries in the Royal Archives at Windsor Castle. Writing in The New York Times Book Review, Caroline Weber described the dual biography as a fresh account of the monarchy's selflessness during a time of relentless tabloid coverage.

== Bibliography ==
Title	Year	ISBN	Publisher	Subject matter	Interviews, presentations, and reviews
Up the Tube: Prime-Time TV and the Silverman Years	1981	ISBN 9780670513857	Viking Press	Fred Silverman	
In All His Glory: The Life of William S. Paley — The Legendary Tycoon and His Brilliant Circle	1990	ISBN 9780671617356	Simon & Schuster	William S. Paley	Booknotes interview with Smith on In All His Glory, December 9, 1990, C-SPAN
Reflected Glory: The Life of Pamela Churchill Harriman	1996	ISBN 9780684809502	Simon & Schuster	Pamela Churchill Harriman	Presentation by Smith on Reflected Glory, December 12, 1996, C-SPAN
Diana in Search of Herself: Portrait of a Troubled Princess	1999	ISBN 9780812930306	Times Books	Diana, Princess of Wales	
Grace and Power: The Private World of the Kennedy White House	2004	ISBN 9780375504495	Random House	John and Jackie Kennedy	
For Love of Politics: Bill and Hillary Clinton in the White House	2007	ISBN 9781400063246	Random House	Bill and Hillary Clinton	Presentation by Smith on The Love of Politics, December 12, 2007, C-SPAN
Elizabeth the Queen: The Life of a Modern Monarch	2012	ISBN 9781400067893	Random House	Elizabeth II	Presentation by Smith on Elizabeth the Queen, January 16, 2012, C-SPAN; Presentation by Smith on Elizabeth the Queen, September 23, 2012, C-SPAN; Interview with Smith on Elizabeth the Queen, September 23, 2012, C-SPAN
Prince Charles: The Passions and Paradoxes of an Improbable Life	2017	ISBN 9781400067909	Random House	Charles, Prince of Wales	
George VI and Elizabeth: The Marriage That Saved the Monarchy	2023	ISBN 9780525511632	Random House	George VI and Queen Elizabeth the Queen Mother	
