= Matthew Garwood =

Australian theatre singer and politician

- Born: 10 May 1989 (age 37); Launceston, Tasmania, Australia
- Occupations: Singer, Politician
- Years active: 2010–present
- Known for: Musical theatre singer, politician and Mayor of Launceston

Matthew Garwood is an Australian operatic and musical theatre singer and politician from Launceston, Tasmania. After being a finalist on The Voice in 2014 he issued his debut album, The Tattooed Tenor (November 2014), which peaked at No. 47 on the ARIA Albums Chart. In 2023, he was elected Mayor of Launceston, and in 2026 he was relected for another term.

== Biography ==
Garwood is an operatic tenor with a background in musical theatre. He performed the role of Raoul in the Phantom of the Opera at the Encore Theatre in Launceston, in March 2014. He appeared on the 2014 season of The Voice from May to June. After being eliminated, Garwood signed with Decca Australia and released his debut album, The Tattooed Tenor (November 2014), which peaked at No. 47 on the ARIA Albums Chart. He had the title role in The Buddy Holly Story in 2016. From June to July 2018 he played Anthony in The Playhouse Theatre production of Sweeney Todd in Hobart.

=== Political Career ===
At the 2022 Tasmanian Local Elections, Garwood was elected as a councillor and Deputy Mayor of Launceston City Council. He was one of seven first-time councillors elected to the 12-member council.

Following the resignation of Mayor Danny Gibson in May 2023, Garwood assumed the role of acting Mayor of Launceston as part of his duty as Deputy Mayor. Gibson's resignation came into affect on the 16th of May, which triggered a by-election. Resultingly, Garwood was elected Mayor on the 12th of July 2023.

Garwood contested for the Mayor of Launceston poistion during the 2026 Tasmanian local elections, seeking his first full term as an elected mayor. He was relected on the 29th of October, receiving 48.3 per cent of first-preference votes.

== Discography ==
=== Studio albums ===
| Title | Album details | Peak chart positions |
| Title | Album details | AUS |
|---|---|---|
| The Tattooed Tenor | Released: November 2014; Formats: CD, digital download; Label: Decca Australia/ UMA (4705502) | 47 |
