= Matt Levett =

Australian actor

- Born: Sydney, New South Wales
- Education: Macquarie University; Western Australian Academy of Performing Arts (2009)
- Occupation: Actor
- Known for: A Place to Call Home; Devil's Playground

Matt Levett is an Australian actor known for playing Andrew Swanson in Australian period drama series A Place to Call Home and Brendan Mahony in 2014 miniseries Devil's Playground.

== Early life and education ==
Levett was born in Sydney, Australia, where he grew up alongside brother Simon, performing in plays for the neighbourhood. He then went on to act in plays and musicals at high school.

Levett studied film at Sydney's Macquarie University, before being accepted into the acting course Western Australian Academy of Performing Arts (WAAPA) at the age of 23, from where he graduated in 2009. In his time at WAAPA, he was awarded the Sally Burton prize for Most Outstanding Performance in a Classical Text, and the Lesley Anderson award.

== Career ==
Levett's first on screen role was in the controversial 2005 Australian short film Boys Grammar, opposite Jai Courtney and Adam J. Yeend. He had early guest roles in several television series including short-lived drama The Cooks and medical drama All Saints in 2005, followed by mystery anthology series Two Twisted in 2006. He also appeared in the recurring guest role of Charlie McKinnon in long-running soap opera Home and Away.

Levett's first supporting role in a TV series was in the 2010 third season of comedy-drama Bed of Roses as Holly's friend Sean Smithwick. He took over the role from Tim Phillipps. In 2012, the short film Unwanted Friend, directed and produced by Levett, was a finalist in the Tropfest short film festival. That same year, he had a recurring guest role in Winners and Losers as Spencer Campbell in 2012, before guesting as Brick in teen dance drama series Dance Academy in 2013.

Levett's then landed his best known role, as Andrew Swanson in period drama series A Place to Call Home, which he played from 2013. Following this, he took on the role of Brendan Mahoney in 2014 AACTA and Logie Award-winning miniseries Devil's Playground, a sequel to the 1976 classic Fred Schepisi film of the same name.

In 2015, Levett was awarded the prestigious Heath Ledger Scholarship in Los Angeles, with judges for that year including Rose Byrne, Ben Mendelsohn, Vince Vaughn, Kieran Darcy-Smith and Gregor Jordan. That same year, he played the lead role of champion lifesaver, Len Smithy, in the critically acclaimed 2015 Australian feature film Drown. As a member of filmmakers collective, ScreenInkMedia, he also wrote and directed 2015 short film Kid.

In 2016, Levett joined the cast of drama series The Secret Daughter in the role of Jack's youngest son, Jamie Norton and appeared in two episodes of horror series Wolf Creek. The following year, he wrote, directed and produced the short film The Death of George Montgomery, also starring in the titular role. In 2018, he served as associate producer on D.C. Fairhurst's debut feature film Reaching Distance. Then in 2019, he was a recipient of the NIDA Gloria Payten Fellowship.

Levett starred as stockbroker Matt Markovich in 2021 mob revenge action thriller film Payback. In 2022, he played the lead role in black and white feature film Misplaced, shot entirely on an iPhone 11. He is set to appear in the upcoming romantic comedy film Pickpockets, opposite Tim Minchin.

Additionally, Levett has provided voiceover work for numerous advertising campaigns including Hungry Jack's, Mazda, Commonwealth Bank, Red Cross, Griffith University, Vodafone and Medibank and has also appeared in television advertisements for Nescafé Gold and AMF Bowling.

Levett is the founder of Sydney-based acting studio The Actors Workout. Before establishing the studio, he taught and directed at NIDA, The Hub Studio, Screenwise, The Actors Centre and Australian Theatre for Young People (ATYP).

== Acting credits ==
=== Film ===
Year	Title	Role	Notes	Ref
2005	Boys Grammar	Gareth	Short film (segment of anthology film Boys Briefs 3: Between the Boys)	
2006	Afterlife	Simon	Short film	
2009	Sorrento		Short film	
2011	Blue Monday		Short film	
2013	Adore (aka Adoration or Two Mothers	Workshop Performer	Feature film	
2013	The Fragments	Dom	Short film	
2013	Showboy	Asher	Short film	
2015	Drown	Len Smithy	Feature film	
2015	Kid	Danny	Short film	
2017	The Death of George Montgomery	George Montgomery	Short film	
2018	Blood Orange	Michael	Short film	
2021	Payback	Mike Markovich	Feature film	
2021	Sunset People	Sebastian		
2022	Misplaced	Him	Feature film	
2024	It Will Find You	Robert	Short film	
2025	It Will Find You	Robert	Feature film	
2026	Drax	Nickolas Eryulan	Feature film	
2026	Flow	Boyfriend	Short film	
TBA	Bite the Hand	Dusty	Short film; completed	
TBA	Pickpockets	TBA	Post-production	

=== Television ===
Year	Title	Role	Notes	Ref
2005	The Cooks	Boy #3	1 episode	
2005	All Saints	Marcus McCallum	1 episode	
2006	Home and Away	Charlie McKinnon	8 episodes	
2006	Two Twisted	Matthew	2 episodes	
2010	Rescue: Special Ops	Luke Mortley	1 episode	
2010–2011	Bed of Roses	Sean Smithwick	Season 3, 12 episodes	
2012	Winners and Losers	Spencer Campbell	4 episodes	
2013	Dance Academy	Brick	Season 3, 1 episode	
2013–2014; 2018	A Place to Call Home	Andrew Swanson	13 episodes	
2014	Devil's Playground	Brendan Mahoney	Miniseries, 6 episodes	
2016	The Secret Daughter	Jamie Norton	12 episodes	
2016	Wolf Creek	Kevin	2 episodes	

=== Theatre ===
Year	Title	Role	Notes	Ref
2011	Girl's Backstage Choices		Newtown Theatre, Sydney	
2019	Things I Know to Be True	Ben	Belvoir St Theatre, Sydney	

== Writer / director / producer credits ==
=== Film ===
Year	Title	Role	Notes	Ref
2012	Unwanted Friend	Director / Producer / Editor	Short film	
2015	Kid	Director / Producer / Editor	Short film	
2017	The Death of George Montgomery	Writer / Director / Producer	Short film	
2018	Reaching Distance	Associate producer	Feature film	

=== Theatre ===
Year	Title	Role	Notes	Ref
2011	Girl's Backstage Choices	Director	Newtown Theatre, Sydney	
