= Stephen G. Smith (writer) =

American writer and editor (born 1949)

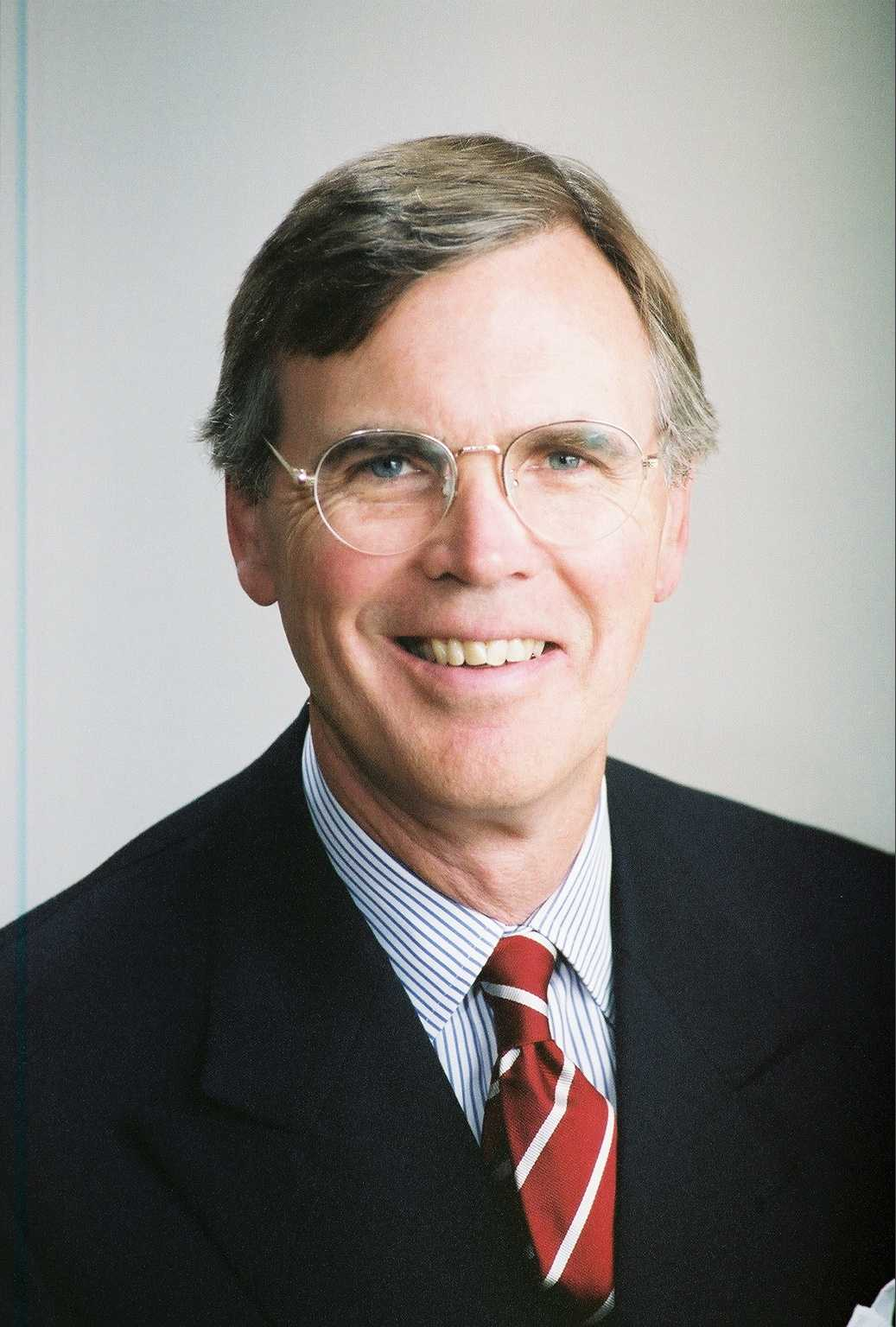
- Born: Stephen Grant Smith; March 6, 1949 (age 77)
- Education: Deerfield Academy; University of Pennsylvania
- Occupations: journalist, writer, editor
- Employer: Atlantic Media
- Spouse: Sally Bedell Smith
- Awards: Ernie Pyle Award; National Magazine Award

Stephen Grant Smith (born March 6, 1949) is an American journalist and editor. He was a senior editor at Atlantic Media and held senior-level editing positions at Newsweek, Time, and U.S. News & World Report.

== Early life ==
Smith grew up in New York City. He is the son of Nora (O'Leary), a fashion editor of Family Circle, and John J. Smith, a partner at an investment bank.

He graduated from Deerfield Academy in 1967. He attended the University of Pennsylvania, graduating with a B.A. in history in 1971. While there, he was a member of literary fraternity St. Anthony Hall.

== Career ==
Smith began his newsmagazine career as a reporter for the Daily Hampshire Gazette and the Albany Times Union. He was an editor at The Philadelphia Inquirer and The Boston Globe, where he won the Ernie Pyle Award in 1977 for human interest storytelling.

In 1978, he moved to New York to become a senior editor at Horizon. He went on to Time magazine, where he began as press writer in November 1978, rising to senior editor in 1981 and ultimately Nation section editor the following year. In 1986, Smith was recruited by Newsweek to be its executive editor, a post he held until 1991, when he moved to Washington to become news editor of Knight Ridder.

In 1994, Smith was the founding editor of Civilization: The Magazine of the Library of Congress which won a National Magazine Award for General Excellence in 1996. He left to work at National Journal in 1996, and was named editor of U.S. News & World Report in 1998, where he remained until 2001. U.S. News on a National Magazine Award for General Excellence Online while he was its editor.

Following a brief stint as vice president of communications at the Brookings Institution, Smith returned to journalism in 2004 to become Washington bureau chief for the Houston Chronicle, followed by an eight-year run as editor of The Washington Examiner. In this position, Smith oversaw The Examiner's transition from daily print tabloid to a weekly magazine focused on national politics and policy. He stepped down in August 2014.

In 2016, Smith returned to Atlantic Media's National Journal, where he served as editor in chief for two years before becoming a senior editor at the parent company. He stayed in that position through 2018.

== Professional affiliations ==
Smith served on the board of the National Press Foundation from 2005 to 2011. He is a member of the Council on Foreign Relations. He has been a member of the American Society of News Editors, American Society of Magazine Editors, National Press Club, and Overseas Press Club. At the University of Pennsylvania, he has been chairman of the Publications Committee.

== Personal life ==
On May 22, 1982, he married Sarah Rowbotham Bedell at St. Bartholomew's Episcopal Church in New York City. She is the daughter of James Rowbotham of St. David's, Pennsylvania, a retired U.S. Army brigadier general. She is a biographer and historian known as Sally Bedell Smith. The couple has one child and two from Sally Smith's previous marriage. They live in Washington, D.C.

He has served on the board of overseers of the University of Pennsylvania, and as a member of the university's Athletics Advisory Board.
