= Jacob Lee =

- Born: 4 November 1994 (age 31); Gold Coast, Queensland, Australia
- Genres: Pop, Contemporary R&B
- Occupation: Artist
- Years active: 2011 – present
- Labels: Philosophical Records
- Website: jacobleeofficial.com philosophicalrecords.com lowlylyricist.com

Jacob Lee Christian Blowes (born 4 November 1994), who performs as Jacob Lee, is an Australian pop, singer-songwriter from the Gold Coast, Queensland. In May–June 2014 he was a contestant on the third Australian series of The Voice, and was coached by will.i.am. Previously he had been a member of radio station, Sea FM's boy band, Oracle East, in 2012. In January 2016, Lee supported Justice Crew on their Live & Local Tour in New South Wales. Lee is the founder and owner of Philosophical Records & Lowly Lyricist.

== History ==
=== 1994-2010: Early life ===
Jacob Lee Christian Blowes, born 4 November 1994, was raised on the Gold Coast, Queensland. He began his music career as a busker in Surfers Paradise, in which he performed on the street for over 4 years. Surfers Paradise.

=== 2011- : The X Factor and Oracle East ===
In 2011, Lee progressed to bootcamp of Season 3 of Australian TV talent show, The X Factor, after Guy Sebastian believed he was too young.

Lee was briefly a member of the boy band, Oracle East, which was devised in 2012 by Gold Coast radio station, Sea FM.

=== 2014: The Voice ===
In 2014 Lee was a contestant on the third season of The Voice (Australia). He was coached by will.i.am. He was eliminated during a sing-off episode, with his rendition of Sebastian's single, "Battle Scars".

The Voice performances and results (2014)
Episode	Song	Original Artist	Result
Audition	"Battle Scars"	Guy Sebastian	Through to Battle rounds
Battle Rounds	"You Make It Real"	James Morrison	Through to Showdowns
Showdowns	"Story of My Life"	One Direction	Gone to sing-off
Sing-off	"Battle Scars"	Guy Sebastian	Eliminated

In June 2014 Lee released his debut single, "Chariot".

=== 2015-present: Current activities ===
In June 2014 Lee released his debut single, "Chariot".

In January 2016 Lee accompanied Australian boy band, Justice Crew, on their New South Wales tour from Coffs Harbour to Sydney.

Lee's released Sine Qua Non on 6 February 2016.

Lee was the featured vocalist on "Need to Feel", a single by Social Hooliganz & Trifo, which peaked at No. 12 on the ARIA Club Tracks in May 2016.

The singer's third EP, Clarity, was released in 2017.

In March 2017, Lee featured on the Social Hooliganz single "Stars at Night", which peaked at No. 36 on the ARIA Club Tracks.

In December 2020, Lee released his second studio album, Conscience.

== Discography ==
=== Albums ===
Title	Details
Philosophy	Release date: 2019; Label: Philosophy; Formats: DD
Conscience	Release date: December 2020; Label: Philosophy; Formats: DD

=== Extended plays ===
Title	Details
Philosophy	Release date: 6 February 2016; Label: Jacob Lee; Formats: DD
Conscience	Release date: March 2017; Label: Jacob Lee; Formats: DD
