= Ultraphon =

Ultraphon is both the name of a historic device to play recordings and a record label of the late 1920s.

== Device ==
The inventor Heinrich J. Küchenmeister (1893–1966) from Berlin developed the Ultraphon in the early 1920s as a device to play records. In a round housing, it had with two sound boxes, two tone arms and two speakers at a right angle. As both needles ran at a fixed distance in the same groove, the effect was a gain in volume and a pseudo-stereo.

A company Deutsche Ultraphon AG was founded on 13 August 1925 to produce these devices. Küchenmeister was the main shareholder of the company that was based in Berlin-Lichtenberg. The new devices were no success, therefore the production was changed to normal phonographs. From 1928 Küchenmeister's company Bertona (short for Berliner Tonapparate-Fabrik) took over their production but it was discontinued in 1932.

== Label ==
Küchenmeister planned an international business group together with the Dutch businessman and engineer Andreas Struve (1882–1954) with divisions for recordings, broadcasting and film.

The first holding was founded in May 1929, with mostly Dutch capital, the N.V. Küchenmeister's Internationale Maatschappij voor Accoustiek. It included a company for sound film, N.V. Küchenmeister's Internationale Maatschappij voor Sprekende Films (founded in December 1927, later the Tobis-Tonbild-Syndikat) and for broadcasting the N.V. Küchenmeister's Internationale Radio Maatschappij, which remained only planned.

N.V. Küchenmeister's Internationale Ultraphoon Maatschappij, founded in October 1928, was responsible for recording. It was merged with Deutsche Ultraphon in Berlin beginning of 1929, aiming at a national label in Germany. The first records were sold in the autumn of 1929.

Directed by Herbert Grenzebach, it produced a wide repertoire, with artists such as Marlene Dietrich, Joseph Schmidt and Erich Kleiber. The sound quality was high, an achievement of sound enginieers Hans-Karl von Willisen and Paul-Günther Erbslöh (1905–2002). The studio for recordings was the ball room of a garden restaurant called Victoria-Garten in Berlin-Wilmersdorf.

The company was liquidated in 1932. Telefunken bought matrices and record plants and founded as Telefunkenplatte GmbH its own label.

=== International labels ===
International labels related to Ultraphon include:

- France: Ste. Internationale Ultraphone, in Villetaneuse, 1931 to 1939 independent as Société Ultraphone Française
- Netherlands: Ultraphon, Amsterdam
- Switzerland: Turicaphon, founded in October 1930 in Zürich
- Czechoslovakia: Ultraphon-Presswerk und Tonstudio, Prague from 1931. The Dutch owners sold the production in Prague and company rights to the Czech company Ravitas. Domestic products were registered as Ultraphon while internationally were labelled Supraphon. In the 1930s, the label released popular performers on gramophone records (such as R. A. Dvorský, Vlado Klemens, Josef Skupa, Karel Vacek and brass music) and was involved in classical music, jazz, swing and spoken word. And the label had success in the 1930s selling classical music and jazz; the company also owned the trademark Supraphon.

After World War II, similar to the other major Czech publishing house during the First Republic, Esta, Ultraphon was nationalized in 1946, based on the Beneš decrees. Both Ultraphon and Supraphon were used for the Czech market, while international products were labelled Mercury Records. Ultraphon A.S. was renamed Supraphon A.S. in 1968 and is now the largest Czech record label.
