= The Masked Marvel =

1943 film by Spencer Gordon Bennet

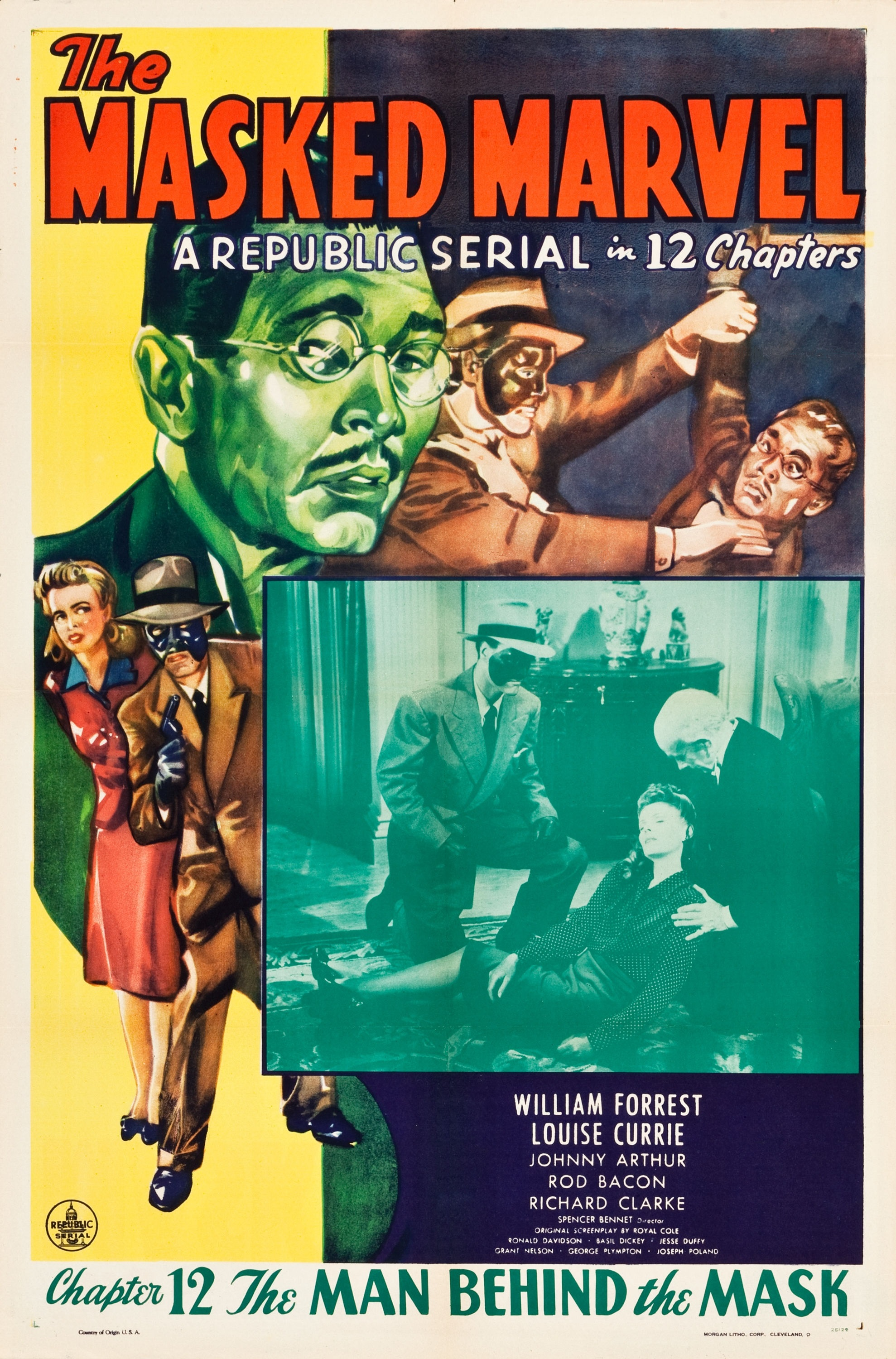
- Film poster
- Directed by: Spencer Gordon Bennet
- Written by: Royal K. Cole; Ronald Davidson; Basil Dickey; Grant Nelson; George H. Plympton; Joseph F. Poland
- Produced by: William J. O'Sullivan
- Starring: William Forrest; Louise Currie; Johnny Arthur; Richard Clarke; Anthony Warde; David Bacon; Tom Steele
- Cinematography: Reggie Lanning
- Distributed by: Republic Pictures
- Release date: November 6, 1943
- Country: United States
- Language: English
- Budget: $157,110 (negative cost: $179,960)

The Masked Marvel (1943) is a 12-chapter film serial created by Republic Pictures, who produced many other well known serials. It was Republic's thirty-first serial, of the sixty-six they produced.

== Plot ==
In The Masked Marvel, a hero dressed in a business suit and a face mask fights the Japanese saboteur Sakima and his espionage organization. The hook of the story is that, in a reversal of the common serial "Masked Mystery Villain" stock character, the audience doesn't know who the hero is until the final reel—all the audience is told is that The Masked Marvel is one of a group of special investigators (the same plotline is used in the Republic serial The Lone Ranger).

== Cast ==
- William Forrest as Martin Crane
- Louise Currie as Alice Hamilton
- Johnny Arthur as Mura Sakima, Japanese saboteur
- Rod Bacon as Jim Arnold
- Richard Clarke as Frank Jeffers
- Anthony Warde as 'Killer' Mace
- David Bacon as Bob Barton/The Masked Marvel
- Bill Healy as Terry Morton
- Howard C. Hickman as Warren Hamilton
- Tom Steele as the Masked Marvel (and two Sakima thugs, both of whom are quickly killed, uncredited)
- Gayne Whitman as The Masked Marvel's voice (uncredited)

== Production ==
The Masked Marvel was budgeted at $157,110 (equivalent to $2,923,152 in 2025) although the final negative cost was $179,960 (equivalent to $3,348,294 in 2025)—a $22,850, or 14.5%, overspend.

It was filmed between 14 July and 18 August 1943. In terms of cost per chapter, this was Republic's third most expensive serial, behind Radar Men from the Moon and The Tiger Woman. The serial's production number was 1296.

The Masked Marvel is a reverse of the "old mystery villain theme". The identity of the Masked Marvel is kept secret from the audience until the last chapter. Clues and red herrings about the hero's identity are unveiled throughout the serial. Four possible candidates are shown: Bob Barton (David Bacon), Frank Jeffers (Richard Clarke), Terry Morton (Bill Healy) and Jim Arnold (Rob Bacon).

The Masked Marvel is really stuntman Tom Steele throughout the serial except the very final shot, in which he removes his mask. The mask was directly moulded from Steele's face. Despite this, Tom Steele was given no screen credit at all, even for the bit parts and stunts he performed in addition to the title role. The voice of the Masked marvel was dubbed in by radio actor Gayne Whitman, since Steele's natural voice was a light tenor, somewhat similar to Henry Fonda's, and did not record as particularly "tough". However, in Steele's most visible secondary role, as a murderous assassin, he disguises his voice, apparently believing that his natural voice would be used for the Marvel.

Bob Barton was a "jinxed" role. David Bacon got the role because four previous actors had injured themselves and were unable to work. While filming one of the serial's big fight scenes, every actor but Bacon was seriously injured. He had joked: "I'll probably get hurt going home in the car". Just two weeks after the production of the serial had been completed, Bacon was murdered and died moments after exiting his car.

Rod Bacon who played Jim Arnold was murdered in 1948.

The Masked Marvel was screenwriter George Plympton's only work at Republic.

=== Cliffhangers ===
Chapter four has an unusual cliffhanger, especially for Republic, as it has no action or death involved. Instead, Sakima, sitting behind his desk in his secret basement, simply (although incorrectly) announces "So, Jim Arnold is the Masked Marvel".

=== Stunts ===
In addition to playing the main character, Tom Steele was also the stunt gaffer on this serial. As stated above, he received no screen credit for this. As an odd outcome of playing both the Masked Marvel and other stunts and bit parts, in one scene Tom Steele chased himself up some stairs.

Steele himself was doubled by a dummy in the scene in which the Marvel is thrown off the top of an enormous gas tank. On the way down one of the dummy's arms gets caught in the rigging of the tank and is clearly ripped off. Yet when the Marvel lands in the back of the truck below, he has both arms intact. The budget and schedules of serials mandated that retakes only occur in the most dire circumstances.

One stunt in Chapter 10 is particularly notable: to prevent a rolling handcar filled with explosives from destroying a train transporting aircraft parts, the Masked Marvel crashes his own car into the handcar. The Masked Marvel survives by jumping aside at the last second. Harmon and Glut write that "the scene is both thrilling and perfect craftsmanship".

- Tom Steele, Republic's stunt gaffer
- Fred Graham doubling Roy Barcroft & Harry Woods
- Duke Green doubling Anthony Warde & Stanley Price
- Betty Miles doubling Louise Currie
- Allen Pomeroy
- Ken Terrell doubling Johnny Arthur
- Carey Loftin
- Eddie Parker

=== Special effects ===
The effects in The Masked Marvel were produced by Republic's team, the Lydecker brothers.

== Release ==
=== Theatrical ===
The Masked Marvel's official release date is 6 November 1943, although this is actually the date the sixth chapter was made available to film exchanges.

=== Television ===
The Masked Marvel was one of twenty-six Republic serials re-edited into features for television release in 1966. The title was changed to Sakima and the Masked Marvel. This version was 100-minutes in length.

== Critical reception ==
Harmon and Glut describe The Masked Marvel as an "exciting serial, one of Republic's best". They especially note "some of the most beautifully photographed and edited action sequences in the history of cliffhangers".

Cline writes that the sight of seeing the hero "jump right into his own fights" rather than have the camera cut between an actor and a stuntman, more than compensated for the reveal in the final chapter when the actor playing the Masked Marvel removes his mask and is clearly not the same actor playing the part in every other scene. This scene is described as almost anticlimactic and "must have been just a little embarrassing". This was one of Republic's best serials.

== Chapter list ==
1. The Masked Crusader (26min 11s)
2. Death Takes the Helm (15min 33s)
3. Dive to Doom (15min 33s)
4. Suspense at Midnight (15min 33s)
5. Murder Meter (15min 33s)
6. Exit to Eternity (15min 33s)
7. Doorway to Destruction (15min 34s)
8. Destined to Die (15min 34s)
9. Danger Express (15min 33s)
10. Suicide Sacrifice (15min 33s)
11. The Fatal Mistake (15min 33s)
12. The Man Behind the Mask (15min 34s)

_{Source:}
