= James M. Banner Jr. =

American historian (born 1935)

- Born: James Morrill Banner Jr. May 3, 1935 (age 91)
- Education: Columbia University (PhD)
- Occupation: Historian
- Parent(s): James M. Banner; Dorothea Bauer Banner

James Morrill Banner Jr. (born May 3, 1935) is an American historian whose scholarly specialties are the history of the United States, of the discipline of history, and of historical thought. He has served in a number of different academic and public capacities.

== Education ==
A New York City native born on May 3, 1935, the son of James M. Banner, one of the nation's first real estate consultants, and Dorothea Bauer Banner, a homemaker and life-long civic and charitable volunteer, after attending Edgemont School (now the Seely Place School) in Scarsdale, New York, he graduated in 1953 from Deerfield Academy, and in 1957 from Yale University. After service in the U.S. Army Counterintelligence Corps in the United States and France, he earned his Ph.D. degree in 1968 at Columbia University under Richard Hofstadter and Eric L. McKitrick.

== Career ==
From 1966 to 1980, Banner taught at Princeton University, where he attained the rank of associate professor of history and chaired the Program in American Civilization and the Program in Continuing Education. He resigned his professorship in 1980 to found the American Association for the Advancement of the Humanities. Subsequently, he served as director of publications and communications for Resources for the Future and the founding director of academic programs of the James Madison Memorial Fellowship Foundation. He is known for the creation of institutions, including the National History Center of the American Historical Association and the History News Service. He was also a co-founder of the National Humanities Alliance.

In civic life, he was the founding chairman of the New Jersey chapter of Common Cause and served on the National Governing Board of Common Cause from 1973 to 1979. The recipient of fellowships from the Social Science Research Council, the John Simon Guggenheim Foundation, and the Charles Warren Center for Studies in American History at Harvard University, he was a Fulbright Scholar/Professor at Charles University, Prague, and is an elected member of the Society of American Historians and a fellow of the American Antiquarian Society. In 2023, the American Historical Association created an annual James M. Banner Jr., Lectureship on the State of the Discipline of History.

== Writings ==
Banner's writings have been diverse and influential. In To the Hartford Convention, which Gordon S. Wood called "truly outstanding" and Jack P. Greene termed "an essential contribution to the early political history of the new nation", Banner tried to bring the Federalist Party back into consideration as fully committed to the principles of the American Revolution and the norms of republican government.

Diane Ravitch called The Elements of Teaching, which Banner wrote with Harold C. Cannon, "a true classic", and Andrew Delbanco termed its second edition "a wise and wonderfully concise reflection on a subject about which one might think everything worth saying had already been said". Banner's Being a Historian was characterized as "a remarkable work of analysis, advice, and warning". His 2022 work, "The Ever-Changing Past: Why All History Is Revisionist History," won praise as "a model of accessible jargon-free prose [that] reveals an erudition across a range of western historiographical trends and debates;" as "a wise and elegant book;" and as a "carefully and judiciously written book", one of "learning, intelligence, and fairness...deserving a wide readership beyond the precincts of university discourse", and "a model of what now seems a somewhat old-fashioned but honorable liberal-humanist approach, respectful of the numerous components and complex dynamics of historical controversy".

== Bibliography ==
=== Books ===
- To the Hartford Convention: The Federalists and the Origins of Party Politics in Massachusetts, 1789-1815 (New York: Alfred A. Knopf, 1969)
- Blacks in America: Bibliographical Essays, with James M. McPherson, Laurence B. Holland, Nancy J. Weiss, and Michael D. Bell (Garden City: Doubleday, 1971)
- Understanding the American Experience: Recent Interpretations, ed. with Barton J. Bernstein and Sheldon Hackney (2 vols.; New York: Harcourt Brace Jovanovich, 1973)
- The Elements of Teaching, with Harold C. Cannon (New Haven: Yale University Press, 1997; 2nd edition, 2017)
- The Elements of Learning, with Harold C. Cannon (New Haven: Yale University Press, 1999)
- Becoming Historians, ed. with John R. Gillis (Chicago: University of Chicago Press, 2009)
- A Century of American Historiography, ed. James M. Banner Jr. (Boston: Bedford/St. Martin's, 2010)
- Being a Historian: An Introduction to the Professional World of History (New York: Cambridge University Press, 2012)
- Presidential Misconduct: from George Washington to Today, ed. James M. Banner Jr. (New York: The New Press, 2019)
- The Ever-Changing Past: Why All History is Revisionist History (New Haven: Yale University Press, 2021)

=== Principal essays ===
- "The Problem of South Carolina," in The Hofstadter Aegis: A Memorial, ed. by Stanley Elkins and Eric McKitrick (New York: Alfred A. Knopf, 1974), pp. 60–93.
- "Historians and the Impeachment Inquiry: A Brief History and Prospectus," Reviews in American History, vol. 4 (June 1976), pp. 139–149.
- "France and the Origins of American Political Culture," Virginia Quarterly Review (Autumn 1988), pp. 651–670.
- "The Federalists—Still in Need of Reconsideration," in Federalists Reconsidered, ed. by Doron Ben-Atar and Barbara B. Oberg (Charlottesville: University Press of Virginia, 1999), pp. 246–253.
- "The Capital and the State: Washington D.C. and the Nature of American Government," in A Republic for the Ages, ed. by Donald R. Kennon (Charlottesville: University Press of Virginia, 1999), pp. 64–86.
- "Historian, Improvised," in James M. Banner Jr., and John R. Gillis, Becoming Historians (Chicago: University of Chicago Press, 2009), pp. 259–288.
- "The Election of 1801 and James A. Bayard's Disinterested Constitutionalism," Journal of the Early Republic, vol. 44 (Fall 2024), pp. 319–353.
