= Mia Morrissey =

Australian actress

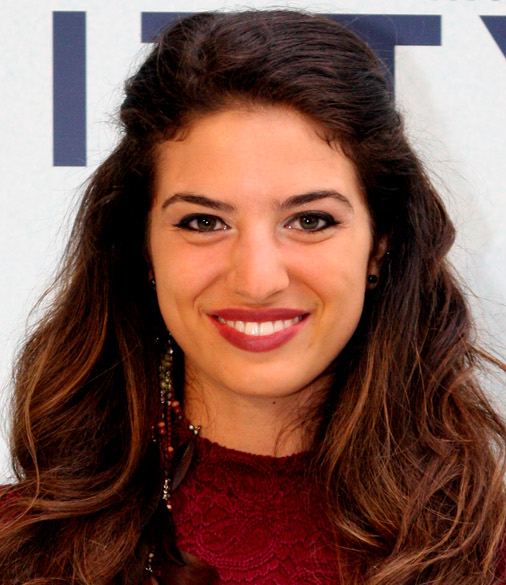
- Born: Sydney, Australia
- Occupations: Actress, model, singer
- Television: In Your Dreams; Home and Away; Deadloch

Mia Morrissey is an Australian actress, model, and singer.

== Early life ==
Morrissey is the daughter of talent agents Mark and Lizzy Morrissey. She was brought up in Sydney and aspired to become an actress from five years old.

== Career ==
In 2012, Morrissey appeared in the Damien Power short film Bat Eyes which was shown at the Venice Film Festival. Morrissey appeared as a singer in 2014, when she competed on season three of The Voice Australia. She also appeared in the Australian children’s television series In Your Dreams as Lucy Bryson.

In 2019, she joined long-running soap opera Home and Away as Jade Lennox. She left the show in 2020.

In 2023, she played Laura Cunning ham in Totally Completely Fine alongside Thomasin McKenzie. She also played Nadiyah in Tasmania-set comedy crime drama Deadloch.

On 11 April 2025, Morrissey was named in the cast for the film Posthumous.

== Personal life ==
Morrissey has endometriosis although it was initially misdiagnosed as coeliac disease.

== Filmography ==
Key
†	Denotes works that have not yet been released

Year	Title	Role	Notes
2012	Bat Eyes	Bat Eyes	Short film
2013–2015	In Your Dreams	Lucy	31 episodes
2018	Harrow	Kyra	1 episode
2019–2020	Home and Away	Jade Lennox	18 episodes
2023	Totally Completely Fine	Laura	4 episodes
2023	Deadloch	Nadiyah	8 episodes
2025	Together	Cath	Film
2026	Agata the Writer	Davina	Film
2026	Posthumous †	Young Brenda	Film
TBA	Pickpockets †	TBA	Film
