= Pickpockets (upcoming film) =

Australian romantic comedy film

- Directed by: D.C. Fairhurst
- Screenplay by: D.C. Fairhurst; Lucy Green
- Produced by: D.C. Fairhurst Lucy Green
- Starring: D.C. Fairhurst; Lucy Green; Tim Minchin; Mia Morrissey
- Production company: Damaged Good Productions
- Country: Australia
- Language: English

Pickpockets is an upcoming Australian romantic comedy film directed by D.C. Fairhurst, who alongside Lucy Green, also co-wrote and co-produced the film. They also have co-starring roles in the film alongside Mia Morrissey and Tim Minchin.

== Cast ==
- Lucy Green
- D.C. Fairhurst
- Tim Minchin
- Mia Morrissey
- Zoe Terakes
- Darren Gilshenan
- Alfie Gledhill
- Danny Kim
- Matt Levett
- Jason Perini
- Marcus Johnson

== Production ==
The film is produced by Damaged Goods Productions. Lucy Green and D.C. Fairhurst produce having adapted the feature length film from their short film This Town Aint Big Enough For The Both Of Us which was shown at Flickerfest in 2021. Fairhurst also directs the film.

The cast features D.C. Fairhurst and Lucy Green and also includes Tim Minchin, Mia Morrissey, Zoe Terakes and Darren Gilshenan.

Principal photography took place in Sydney, Australia and was completed by November 2024.
