= List of films based on television programs =

This is a list of television programs that were later adapted into feature films.

== Programs with films that are prequels, sequels, or based upon the series ==
TV program				Film		
Title	Channel	Premiere	End	Title	Release type	Premiere
21 Emon	TV Asahi	May 2, 1991	March 26, 1992	21-Emon: To Space! The Barefoot Princess	Theatrical	March 7, 1992
21 Jump Street	Fox	April 12, 1987	April 27, 1991	21 Jump Street	Theatrical	March 16, 2012
21 Jump Street	Fox	April 12, 1987	April 27, 1991	22 Jump Street	Theatrical	June 13, 2014
3000 Leagues in Search of Mother	Fuji TV	January 4, 1976	December 26, 1976	Marco: 3000 Leagues in Search of Mother	Theatrical	April 2, 1999
8 Man	TBS	November 7, 1963	December 31, 1964	Eitoman - Subete no Sabishī Yoru no Tame ni	Television	1992
The A-Team	NBC	January 23, 1983	March 8, 1987	The A-Team	Theatrical	June 11, 2010
Absolutely Fabulous	BBC Two; BBC One	November 12, 1992	July 23, 2012	Absolutely Fabulous: The Movie	Theatrical	July 1, 2016
The Adventures of Blinky Bill	ABC; Seven Network (Australia)	January 1, 1993	July 5, 2004	Blinky Bill's White Christmas	Television	December 24, 2005
The Adventures of Blinky Bill	ABC; Seven Network (Australia)	January 1, 1993	July 5, 2004	Blinky Bill the Movie	Theatrical	September 17, 2015
The Adventures of Hutch the Honeybee	Fuji TV	April 7, 1970	September 8, 1971	Hutch the Honeybee	Theatrical	July 31, 2010
The Adventures of Robin Hood	ITV (ATV)	September 25, 1955	March 1, 1959	Sword of Sherwood Forest	Theatrical	December 26, 1960
The Adventures of the Terrible Ten	GTV-9 (Australia)	1959	1960	Funny Things Happen Down Under	Theatrical	August 1965
Æon Flux	MTV	November 30, 1991	October 10, 1995	Æon Flux	Theatrical	December 2, 2005
AIBOU: Tokyo Detective Duo	ANN (TV Asahi)	June 3, 2000	present	AIBOU: The Movie	Theatrical	May 1, 2008
AIBOU: Tokyo Detective Duo	ANN (TV Asahi)	June 3, 2000	present	AIBOU: CSI Files	Theatrical	March 23, 2009
AIBOU: Tokyo Detective Duo	ANN (TV Asahi)	June 3, 2000	present	AIBOU: The Movie II	Theatrical	December 23, 2010
AIBOU: Tokyo Detective Duo	ANN (TV Asahi)	June 3, 2000	present	AIBOU: X-DAY	Theatrical	March 23, 2013
AIBOU: Tokyo Detective Duo	ANN (TV Asahi)	June 3, 2000	present	AIBOU: The Movie III	Theatrical	April 26, 2014
AIBOU: Tokyo Detective Duo	ANN (TV Asahi)	June 3, 2000	present	AIBOU: The Movie IV	Theatrical	February 11, 2017
Aim for the Ace!	Mainichi Broadcasting System	October 5, 1973	March 29, 1974	Aim for the Ace!	Theatrical	September 8, 1979
Aim for the Ace!	Nippon TV	October 14, 1978	March 31, 1979	Aim for the Ace!	Theatrical	September 8, 1979
All That	Nickelodeon	April 16, 1994; January 19, 2002	November 18, 2000; October 22, 2005	Good Burger	Theatrical	July 25, 1997
All That	Nickelodeon	April 16, 1994; January 19, 2002	November 18, 2000; October 22, 2005	Good Burger 2	Streaming	November 22, 2023
Da Ali G Show	Channel 4 HBO	March 31, 2000	August 22, 2004	Ali G Indahouse	Theatrical	March 22, 2002
Da Ali G Show	Channel 4 HBO	March 31, 2000	August 22, 2004	Borat	Theatrical	November 3, 2006
Da Ali G Show	Channel 4 HBO	March 31, 2000	August 22, 2004	Brüno	Theatrical	July 10, 2009
Da Ali G Show	Channel 4 HBO	March 31, 2000	August 22, 2004	Borat Subsequent Moviefilm	Streaming	October 23, 2020
Alvin and the Chipmunks (1983)	NBC	September 17, 1983	December 1, 1990	The Chipmunk Adventure	Theatrical	May 22, 1987
Alvin and the Chipmunks (1983)	NBC	September 17, 1983	December 1, 1990	Alvin and the Chipmunks Meet Frankenstein	Direct-to-video	September 28, 1999
Alvin and the Chipmunks (1983)	NBC	September 17, 1983	December 1, 1990	Alvin and the Chipmunks Meet the Wolfman	Direct-to-video	August 29, 2000
Alvin and the Chipmunks (1983)	NBC	September 17, 1983	December 1, 1990	Little Alvin and the Mini-Munks	Direct-to-video	November 15, 2003
Alvin and the Chipmunks (1983)	NBC	September 17, 1983	December 1, 1990	Alvin and the Chipmunks	Theatrical	December 14, 2007
Alvin and the Chipmunks (1983)	NBC	September 17, 1983	December 1, 1990	Alvin and the Chipmunks: The Squeakquel	Theatrical	December 23, 2009
Alvin and the Chipmunks (1983)	NBC	September 17, 1983	December 1, 1990	Alvin and the Chipmunks: Chipwrecked	Theatrical	December 16, 2011
Alvin and the Chipmunks (1983)	NBC	September 17, 1983	December 1, 1990	Alvin and the Chipmunks: The Road Chip	Theatrical	December 18, 2015
The Amazing World of Gumball	Cartoon Network	May 3, 2011	June 24, 2019	The Amazing World of Gumball: The Movie!	Theatrical	TBD
America's Most Wanted	Fox	February 7, 1988; December 2, 2011; March 15, 2021	June 18, 2011; October 12, 2012 present	If Looks Could Kill: From the Files of America's Most Wanted	Television	February 6, 1996
Amrutham	Gemini TV	November 18, 2001	November 18, 2007	Amrutham Chandamamalo	Theatrical	May 17, 2014
Ang TV	ABS-CBN	October 19, 1992	April 11, 1997	Ang TV The Movie: The Adarna Adventure	Theatrical	October 2, 1996
Animaniacs	Fox Kids; Kids' WB	September 13, 1993	November 14, 1998	Wakko's Wish	Direct-to-video	December 21, 1999
Aqua Teen Hunger Force	Adult Swim	December 30, 2000	August 30, 2015	Aqua Teen Hunger Force Colon Movie Film for Theaters	Theatrical	April 13, 2007
Aqua Teen Hunger Force	Adult Swim	December 30, 2000	August 30, 2015	Aqua Teen Forever: Plantasm	Direct-to-video	November 8, 2022
Are You Being Served?	BBC1	September 8, 1972	April 1, 1985	Are You Being Served?	Theatrical	July 31, 1977
Arthur	PBS	October 7, 1996	February 21, 2022	Arthur's Missing Pal	Television	July 1, 2006
Astro Boy	Fuji TV	April 6, 2003	March 28, 2004	Astro Boy: Mighty Atom – Visitor of 100,000 Light Years, IGZA	Theatrical	September 1, 2005
Avatar: The Last Airbender	Nickelodeon	February 21, 2005	July 19, 2008	The Last Airbender	Theatrical	July 1, 2010
Avatar: The Last Airbender	Nickelodeon	February 21, 2005	July 19, 2008	Avatar Aang: The Last Airbender	Streaming	July 25, 2026
The Avengers	ITV (ABC)	January 7, 1961	May 21, 1969	The Avengers	Theatrical	August 14, 1998
Babar	CBC; Global TV; HBO	April 2, 1989	June 5, 1991	Babar: The Movie	Theatrical	July 28, 1989
Baby Looney Tunes	Kids' WB (2001–2003) (seasons 1-3); Cartoon Network (2001–2006) (all seasons)	June 3, 2001	October 16, 2006	Baby Looney Tunes' Eggs-traordinary Adventure	Direct-to-video	February 11, 2003
Babylon 5	PTEN; TNT	February 22, 1993	November 25, 1998	Babylon 5: In the Beginning	Television	January 4, 1998
Babylon 5	PTEN; TNT	February 22, 1993	November 25, 1998	Babylon 5: Thirdspace	Television	July 19, 1998
Babylon 5	PTEN; TNT	February 22, 1993	November 25, 1998	Babylon 5: The River of Souls	Television	November 8, 1998
Babylon 5	PTEN; TNT	February 22, 1993	November 25, 1998	Babylon 5: A Call to Arms	Television	January 3, 1999
Babylon 5	PTEN; TNT	February 22, 1993	November 25, 1998	Babylon 5: The Legend of the Rangers	Television	January 19, 2002
Bad Education	BBC Three	August 14, 2012	present	The Bad Education Movie	Theatrical	August 21, 2015
Bakusō Kyōdai Let's & Go!!	TV Tokyo (Japan)	January 8, 1996	December 22, 1997	Bakusō Kyōdai Let's & Go!! WGP Bōsō Miniyonku Dai Tsuiseki!	Theatrical	July 5, 1997
The Banana Splits Adventure Hour	NBC	September 7, 1968	September 5, 1970	The Banana Splits Movie	Direct-to-video	August 13, 2019
Barney & Friends	PBS (PBS Kids)	April 6, 1992	November 2, 2010	Barney's Great Adventure	Theatrical	April 3, 1998
Batman	ABC	January 12, 1966	March 14, 1968	Batman	Theatrical	July 30, 1966
Batman	ABC	January 12, 1966	March 14, 1968	Return to the Batcave: The Misadventures of Adam and Burt	Television	March 9, 2003
Batman	ABC	January 12, 1966	March 14, 1968	Batman: Return of the Caped Crusaders	Direct-to-video	October 6, 2016
Batman	ABC	January 12, 1966	March 14, 1968	Batman vs. Two-Face	Direct-to-video	October 10, 2017
The Batman	Kids' WB	September 11, 2004	March 8, 2008	The Batman vs. Dracula	Direct-to-video	October 18, 2005
Batman: The Animated Series	Fox Kids	September 5, 1992	September 15, 1995	Batman: Mask of the Phantasm	Theatrical	December 25, 1993
Batman: The Animated Series	Fox Kids	September 5, 1992	September 15, 1995	Batman & Mr. Freeze: SubZero	Direct-to-video	March 17, 1998
Batman: The Brave and the Bold	Cartoon Network	November 14, 2008	November 18, 2011	Scooby-Doo! & Batman: The Brave and the Bold	Direct-to-video	January 9, 2018
Batman Beyond	Kids' WB	January 10, 1999	December 18, 2001	Batman Beyond: Return of the Joker	Direct-to-video	December 12, 2000
Baywatch	NBC; Syndication	September 22, 1989; September 23, 1991	April 6, 1990; May 14, 2001	Baywatch	Theatrical	May 25, 2017
Beast Wars II: Super Life-Form Transformers	TV Tokyo	April 1, 1998	January 27, 1999	Beast Wars II: Lio Convoy's Close Call!	Theatrical	December 19, 1998
Beavis and Butt-Head	MTV	March 8, 1993; October 27, 2011	November 28, 1997; December 29, 2011	Beavis and Butt-Head Do America	Theatrical	December 20, 1996
Beavis and Butt-Head	MTV	March 8, 1993; October 27, 2011	November 28, 1997; December 29, 2011	Beavis and Butt-Head Do the Universe	Streaming	June 23, 2022
Ben 10	Cartoon Network	December 27, 2005	present	Ben 10: Secret of the Omnitrix	Television	August 10, 2007
Ben 10	Cartoon Network	December 27, 2005	present	Ben 10: Race Against Time	Television	November 21, 2007
Ben 10	Cartoon Network	December 27, 2005	present	Ben 10: Alien Swarm	Television	November 25, 2009
Ben 10	Cartoon Network	December 27, 2005	present	Ben 10: Destroy All Aliens	Television	March 23, 2012
Ben 10	Cartoon Network	December 27, 2005	present	Ben 10 Versus the Universe: The Movie	Television	October 10, 2020
The Beverly Hillbillies	CBS	September 26, 1962	March 23, 1971	The Beverly Hillbillies	Theatrical	October 15, 1993
Bewitched	ABC	September 17, 1964	March 25, 1972	Bewitched	Theatrical	June 24, 2005
Beyblade	TV Tokyo	January 8, 2001; January 7, 2002; January 6, 2003	December 24, 2001; December 30, 2002; December 29, 2003	Beyblade: Fierce Battle	Theatrical	August 17, 2002
Bikkuriman	TV Asahi	October 11, 1987	April 2, 1989	Bikkuriman: Moen Zone no Himitsu	Theatrical	July 9, 1988
Black Jack	Yomiuri TV	October 11, 2004	March 6, 2006	Black Jack: The Two Doctors of Darkness	Theatrical	December 17, 2005
Bleach	TV Tokyo	October 5, 2004	March 27, 2012	Bleach: Memories of Nobody		December 16, 2006
Bleach	TV Tokyo	October 5, 2004	March 27, 2012	Bleach: The DiamondDust Rebellion		December 22, 2007
Bleach	TV Tokyo	October 5, 2004	March 27, 2012	Bleach: Fade to Black		December 13, 2008
Bleach	TV Tokyo	October 5, 2004	March 27, 2012	Bleach: Hell Verse		December 4, 2010
Bleach	TV Tokyo	October 5, 2004	March 27, 2012	Bleach		July 20, 2018
Bless This House	ITV	February 2, 1971	April 22, 1976	Bless This House	Theatrical	September 8, 1972
Blue Mountain State	Spike	January 11, 2010	November 30, 2011	Blue Mountain State: The Rise of Thadland	Theatrical	February 2, 2016
Blue's Clues	Nick Jr. Channel	September 8, 1996	August 6, 2006	Blue's Big Musical Movie	Direct-to-video	October 3, 2000
Bob's Burgers	Fox	January 9, 2011	present	The Bob's Burgers Movie	Theatrical	May 27, 2022
Boku Patalliro!	Fuji TV	April 8, 1982	May 13, 1983	Patalliro! Stardust Keikaku	Theatrical	July 10, 1983
Boonie Bears	China Central Television	January 22, 2012	present	Boonie Bears: To the Rescue	Theatrical	January 17, 2014
Boonie Bears	China Central Television	January 22, 2012	present	Boonie Bears: A Mystical Winter	Theatrical	January 30, 2015
Boonie Bears	China Central Television	January 22, 2012	present	Boonie Bears: The Big Top Secret	Theatrical	January 16, 2016
Boonie Bears	China Central Television	January 22, 2012	present	Boonie Bears: Entangled Worlds	Theatrical	January 28, 2017
Boonie Bears	China Central Television	January 22, 2012	present	Boonie Bears: The Big Shrink	Theatrical	February 16, 2018
Boonie Bears	China Central Television	January 22, 2012	present	Boonie Bears: Blast Into the Past	Theatrical	February 5, 2019
Boonie Bears	China Central Television	January 22, 2012	present	Boonie Bears: The Wild Life	Theatrical	February 12, 2021
Boonie Bears	China Central Television	January 22, 2012	present	Boonie Bears: Back to Earth	Theatrical	February 1, 2022
Boonie Bears	China Central Television	January 22, 2012	present	Boonie Bears: Guardian Code	Theatrical	January 22, 2023
Boonie Bears	China Central Television	January 22, 2012	present	Boonie Bears: Time Twist	Theatrical	February 10, 2024
Boonie Bears	China Central Television	January 22, 2012	present	Boonie Bears: Future Reborn	Theatrical	January 29, 2025
Boonie Bears	China Central Television	January 22, 2012	present	Boonie Bears: The Hidden Protector	Theatrical	February 17, 2026
Bottom	BBC2	September 17, 1991	April 10, 1995	Guest House Paradiso	Theatrical	December 3, 1999
The Box	The 0-10 Network	February 11, 1974	October 11, 1977	The Box	Theatrical	August 8, 1975
The Brady Bunch	ABC	September 26, 1969	March 8, 1974	The Brady Bunch Movie	Theatrical	February 17, 1995
The Brady Bunch	ABC	September 26, 1969	March 8, 1974	A Very Brady Sequel	Theatrical	August 23, 1996
The Brady Bunch	ABC	September 26, 1969	March 8, 1974	The Brady Bunch in the White House	Television	November 29, 2002
BraveStarr	Syndication	September 14, 1987	February 24, 1988	BraveStarr: The Movie	Theatrical	March 18, 1988
Breaking Bad	AMC	January 20, 2008	September 29, 2013	El Camino: A Breaking Bad Movie	Streaming	October 11, 2019
The Bugs Bunny Show	ABC; CBS	October 11, 1960	September 2, 2000	The Bugs Bunny/Road Runner Movie	Theatrical	September 14, 1979
The Bugs Bunny Show	ABC; CBS	October 11, 1960	September 2, 2000	The Looney Looney Looney Bugs Bunny Movie	Theatrical	November 20, 1981
The Bugs Bunny Show	ABC; CBS	October 11, 1960	September 2, 2000	Bugs Bunny's 3rd Movie: 1001 Rabbit Tales	Theatrical	November 19, 1982
The Bugs Bunny Show	ABC; CBS	October 11, 1960	September 2, 2000	Daffy Duck's Fantastic Island	Theatrical	August 5, 1983
The Bugs Bunny Show	ABC; CBS	October 11, 1960	September 2, 2000	Daffy Duck's Quackbusters	Theatrical	September 24, 1988
The Bugs Bunny Show	ABC; CBS	October 11, 1960	September 2, 2000	Space Jam	Theatrical	November 15, 1996
The Bugs Bunny Show	ABC; CBS	October 11, 1960	September 2, 2000	Tweety's High-Flying Adventure	Direct-to-video	September 12, 2000
The Bugs Bunny Show	ABC; CBS	October 11, 1960	September 2, 2000	Looney Tunes: Back in Action	Theatrical	November 14, 2003
The Bugs Bunny Show	ABC; CBS	October 11, 1960	September 2, 2000	Bah, Humduck! A Looney Tunes Christmas	Direct-to-video	November 14, 2006
The Bugs Bunny Show	ABC; CBS	October 11, 1960	September 2, 2000	Looney Tunes: Rabbits Run	Direct-to-video	August 4, 2015
The Bugs Bunny Show	ABC; CBS	October 11, 1960	September 2, 2000	Space Jam: A New Legacy	Theatrical	July 16, 2021
The Bugs Bunny Show	ABC; CBS	October 11, 1960	September 2, 2000	King Tweety	Direct-to-video	June 14, 2022
The Bugs Bunny Show	ABC; CBS	October 11, 1960	September 2, 2000	Taz: Quest for Burger	Direct-to-video	June 6, 2023
The Bugs Bunny Show	ABC; CBS	October 11, 1960	September 2, 2000	The Day the Earth Blew Up: A Looney Tunes Movie	Theatrical	March 14, 2025
The Bund	TVB	March 10, 1980	April 11, 1980	Shanghai Grand	Theatrical	July 13, 1996
Caillou	Teletoon	September 15, 1997	October 5, 2010	Caillou's Holiday Movie	Direct-to-video	October 7, 2003
Callan	ITV	July 8, 1967	May 24, 1972	Callan	Theatrical	May 23, 1974
Calvento Files	ABS-CBN	December 4, 1995	October 2, 1998	Calvento Files: The Movie	Theatrical	May 14, 1997
Captain Video and His Video Rangers	DuMont	June 27, 1949	April 1, 1955	Captain Video: Master of the Stratosphere	Theatrical	December 27, 1951
Car 54, Where Are You?	NBC	September 17, 1961	April 14, 1963	Car 54, Where Are You?	Theatrical	January 28, 1994
Cardcaptor Sakura	NHK BS2	April 7, 1998	March 21, 2000	Cardcaptor Sakura: The Movie	Theatrical	August 21, 1999
Cardcaptor Sakura	NHK BS2	April 7, 1998	March 21, 2000	Cardcaptor Sakura Movie 2: The Sealed Card	Theatrical	July 15, 2000
Care Bears	Syndication	September 14, 1985	November 23, 1985	Care Bears Movie II: A New Generation	Theatrical	March 21, 1986
The Care Bears Family	ABC	September 13, 1986	January 23, 1988	The Care Bears Adventure in Wonderland	Theatrical	August 7, 1987
Case Closed	NNS (ytv)	January 8, 1996	present	Case Closed: The Time Bombed Skyscraper	Theatrical	April 19, 1997
Case Closed	NNS (ytv)	January 8, 1996	present	Case Closed: The Fourteenth Target	Theatrical	April 18, 1998
Case Closed	NNS (ytv)	January 8, 1996	present	Case Closed: The Last Wizard of the Century	Theatrical	April 17, 1999
Case Closed	NNS (ytv)	January 8, 1996	present	Case Closed: Captured in Her Eyes	Theatrical	April 22, 2000
Case Closed	NNS (ytv)	January 8, 1996	present	Case Closed: Countdown to Heaven	Theatrical	April 21, 2001
Case Closed	NNS (ytv)	January 8, 1996	present	Case Closed: The Phantom of Baker Street	Theatrical	April 20, 2002
Case Closed	NNS (ytv)	January 8, 1996	present	Detective Conan: Crossroad in the Ancient Capital	Theatrical	April 19, 2003
Case Closed	NNS (ytv)	January 8, 1996	present	Detective Conan: Magician of the Silver Sky	Theatrical	April 17, 2004
Case Closed	NNS (ytv)	January 8, 1996	present	Detective Conan: Strategy Above the Depths	Theatrical	April 9, 2005
Case Closed	NNS (ytv)	January 8, 1996	present	Detective Conan: The Private Eyes' Requiem	Theatrical	April 15, 2006
Case Closed	NNS (ytv)	January 8, 1996	present	Detective Conan: Jolly Roger in the Deep Azure	Theatrical	April 21, 2007
Case Closed	NNS (ytv)	January 8, 1996	present	Detective Conan: Full Score of Fear	Theatrical	April 19, 2008
Case Closed	NNS (ytv)	January 8, 1996	present	Detective Conan: The Raven Chaser	Theatrical	April 18, 2009
Case Closed	NNS (ytv)	January 8, 1996	present	Detective Conan: The Lost Ship in the Sky	Theatrical	April 17, 2010
Case Closed	NNS (ytv)	January 8, 1996	present	Detective Conan: Quarter of Silence	Theatrical	April 16, 2011
Case Closed	NNS (ytv)	January 8, 1996	present	Detective Conan: The Eleventh Striker	Theatrical	April 14, 2012
Case Closed	NNS (ytv)	January 8, 1996	present	Detective Conan: Private Eye in the Distant Sea	Theatrical	April 20, 2013
Case Closed	NNS (ytv)	January 8, 1996	present	Detective Conan: Dimensional Sniper	Theatrical	April 19, 2014
Case Closed	NNS (ytv)	January 8, 1996	present	Detective Conan: Sunflowers of Inferno	Theatrical	April 18, 2015
Case Closed	NNS (ytv)	January 8, 1996	present	Case Closed: The Darkest Nightmare	Theatrical	April 16, 2016
Case Closed	NNS (ytv)	January 8, 1996	present	Case Closed: The Crimson Love Letter	Theatrical	April 15, 2017
Case Closed	NNS (ytv)	January 8, 1996	present	Case Closed: Zero the Enforcer	Theatrical	April 13, 2018
Case Closed	NNS (ytv)	January 8, 1996	present	Detective Conan: The Fist of Blue Sapphire	Theatrical	April 12, 2019
Case Closed	NNS (ytv)	January 8, 1996	present	Detective Conan: The Scarlet Bullet	Theatrical	April 16, 2021
Case Closed	NNS (ytv)	January 8, 1996	present	Detective Conan: The Bride of Halloween	Theatrical	April 15, 2022
Case Closed	NNS (ytv)	January 8, 1996	present	Detective Conan: Black Iron Submarine	Theatrical	April 14, 2023
Case Closed	NNS (ytv)	January 8, 1996	present	Detective Conan: The Million-dollar Pentagram	Theatrical	April 12, 2024
Case Closed	NNS (ytv)	January 8, 1996	present	Detective Conan: One-eyed Flashback	Theatrical	April 18, 2025
Castelo Rá-Tim-Bum	TV Cultura	May 9, 1994	December 24, 1997	Castelo Rá-Tim-Bum	Theatrical	December 31, 1999
Challenge of the GoBots	Syndication	September 8, 1984	December 13, 1985	GoBots: Battle of the Rock Lords	Theatrical	March 21, 1986
Charlie's Angels	ABC	September 22, 1976	June 24, 1981	Charlie's Angels (2000)	Theatrical	November 3, 2000
Charlie's Angels	ABC	September 22, 1976	June 24, 1981	Charlie's Angels: Full Throttle	Theatrical	June 27, 2003
Charlie's Angels	ABC	September 22, 1976	June 24, 1981	Charlie's Angels (2019)	Theatrical	November 15, 2019
Chip 'n Dale: Rescue Rangers	Disney Channel (1989); Syndication (1989–90)	March 4, 1989	November 19, 1990	Chip 'n Dale: Rescue Rangers	Streaming	May 20, 2022
CHiPs	NBC	September 15, 1977	May 1, 1983	CHiPs	Theatrical	March 24, 2017
Chousei Kantai Sazer-X	TV Tokyo	October 1, 2005	June 24, 2006	Chousei Kantai Sazer-X the Movie: Fight! Star Warriors	Theatrical	December 17, 2005
Cidade dos Homens	TV Globo	October 15, 2002	December 16, 2005	City of Men	Theatrical	August 31, 2007
Cinéma 16	FR3	October 11, 1975	February 19, 1991	The Long Way Home	Television	March 1, 1998
City Hunter	Yomiuri TV	April 6, 1987	March 28, 1988	City Hunter: .357 Magnum	Theatrical	June 17, 1989
City Hunter	Yomiuri TV	April 2, 1988	July 14, 1989	City Hunter: Bay City Wars	Theatrical	August 25, 1990
City Hunter	Yomiuri TV	October 15, 1989	January 21, 1990	City Hunter: Million Dollar Conspiracy	Theatrical	August 25, 1990
City Hunter	Yomiuri TV	April 28, 1991	October 10, 1991	City Hunter the Movie: Shinjuku Private Eyes	Theatrical	February 8, 2019
Clifford the Big Red Dog	PBS Kids	September 4, 2000	February 25, 2003	Clifford's Really Big Movie	Theatrical	February 20, 2004
Clifford the Big Red Dog	PBS Kids	September 4, 2000	February 25, 2003	Clifford the Big Red Dog	Theatrical	November 10, 2021
Climax!	CBS	October 7, 1954	June 26, 1958	The Young Stranger	Theatrical	April 7, 1957
Climax!	CBS	October 7, 1954	June 26, 1958	Public Pigeon No. 1	Theatrical	May 19, 1957
Climax!	CBS	October 7, 1954	June 26, 1958	The Unholy Wife	Theatrical	September 30, 1957
Codename: Kids Next Door	Cartoon Network	December 6, 2002	January 21, 2008	Codename: Kids Next Door—Operation: Z.E.R.O.	Television	August 11, 2006
Compañeros	Antena 3	March 25, 1998	July 16, 2002	No te fallaré	Theatrical	March 2, 2001
Corner Gas	CTV	January 22, 2004	April 13, 2009	Corner Gas: The Movie	Theatrical	November 25, 2014
Courage the Cowardly Dog	Cartoon Network	November 12, 1999	November 22, 2002	Straight Outta Nowhere: Scooby-Doo! Meets Courage the Cowardly Dog	Direct-to-video	September 14, 2021
Cowboy Bebop	TV Tokyo	April 3, 1998	April 24, 1999	Cowboy Bebop: The Movie	Theatrical	September 1, 2001
Craig of the Creek	Cartoon Network	March 30, 2018	January 25, 2025	Craig Before the Creek	Television	January 13, 2024
Crayon Shin-chan	TV Asahi	April 13, 1992	present	Crayon Shin-chan: Action Mask vs. Leotard Devil	Theatrical	July 24, 1993
Crayon Shin-chan	TV Asahi	April 13, 1992	present	Crayon Shin-chan: The Hidden Treasure of the Buri Buri Kingdom	Theatrical	April 23, 1994
Crayon Shin-chan	TV Asahi	April 13, 1992	present	Crayon Shin-chan: Unkokusai's Ambition	Theatrical	April 15, 1995
Crayon Shin-chan	TV Asahi	April 13, 1992	present	Crayon Shin-chan: Great Adventure in Henderland	Theatrical	April 13, 1996
Crayon Shin-chan	TV Asahi	April 13, 1992	present	Crayon Shin-chan: Pursuit of the Balls of Darkness	Theatrical	April 19, 1997
Crayon Shin-chan	TV Asahi	April 13, 1992	present	Crayon Shin-chan: Blitzkrieg! Pig's Hoof's Secret Mission	Theatrical	April 18, 1998
Crayon Shin-chan	TV Asahi	April 13, 1992	present	Crayon Shin-chan: Explosion! The Hot Spring's Feel Good Final Battle	Theatrical	April 17, 1999
Crayon Shin-chan	TV Asahi	April 13, 1992	present	Crayon Shin-chan: Jungle That Invites Storm	Theatrical	April 22, 2000
Crayon Shin-chan	TV Asahi	April 13, 1992	present	Crayon Shin-chan: Fierceness That Invites Storm! The Adult Empire Strikes Back	Theatrical	April 21, 2001
Crayon Shin-chan	TV Asahi	April 13, 1992	present	Crayon Shin-chan: Fierceness That Invites Storm! The Battle of the Warring States	Theatrical	April 20, 2002
Crayon Shin-chan	TV Asahi	April 13, 1992	present	Crayon Shin-chan: Fierceness That Invites Storm! Yakiniku Road of Honor	Theatrical	April 19, 2003
Crayon Shin-chan	TV Asahi	April 13, 1992	present	Crayon Shin-chan: Fierceness That Invites Storm! The Kasukabe Boys of the Evening Sun	Theatrical	April 17, 2004
Crayon Shin-chan	TV Asahi	April 13, 1992	present	Crayon Shin-chan: The Legend Called Buri Buri 3 Minutes Charge	Theatrical	April 16, 2005
Crayon Shin-chan	TV Asahi	April 13, 1992	present	Crayon Shin-chan: The Legend Called: Dance! Amigo!	Theatrical	April 15, 2006
Crayon Shin-chan	TV Asahi	April 13, 1992	present	Crayon Shin-chan: Fierceness That Invites Storm! The Singing Buttocks Bomb	Theatrical	April 21, 2007
Crayon Shin-chan	TV Asahi	April 13, 1992	present	Crayon Shin-chan: Fierceness That Invites Storm! The Hero of Kinpoko	Theatrical	April 19, 2008
Crayon Shin-chan	TV Asahi	April 13, 1992	present	Crayon Shin-chan: Roar! Kasukabe Animal Kingdom	Theatrical	April 18, 2009
Crayon Shin-chan	TV Asahi	April 13, 1992	present	Crayon Shin-chan: Super-Dimension! The Storm Called My Bride	Theatrical	April 17, 2010
Crayon Shin-chan	TV Asahi	April 13, 1992	present	Crayon Shin-chan: Fierceness That Invites Storm! Operation Golden Spy	Theatrical	April 16, 2011
Crayon Shin-chan	TV Asahi	April 13, 1992	present	Crayon Shin-chan: Fierceness That Invites Storm! Me and the Space Princess	Theatrical	April 14, 2012
Crayon Shin-chan	TV Asahi	April 13, 1992	present	Crayon Shin-chan: Very Tasty! B-class Gourmet Survival!!	Theatrical	April 20, 2013
Crayon Shin-chan	TV Asahi	April 13, 1992	present	Crayon Shin-chan: Intense Battle! Robo Dad Strikes Back	Theatrical	April 19, 2014
Crayon Shin-chan	TV Asahi	April 13, 1992	present	Crayon Shin-chan: My Moving Story! Cactus Large Attack!	Theatrical	April 18, 2015
Crayon Shin-chan	TV Asahi	April 13, 1992	present	Crayon Shin-chan: Fast Asleep! The Great Assault on Dreamy World!	Theatrical	April 16, 2016
Crayon Shin-chan	TV Asahi	April 13, 1992	present	Crayon Shin-chan: Invasion!! Alien Shiriri	Theatrical	April 15, 2017
Crayon Shin-chan	TV Asahi	April 13, 1992	present	Crayon Shin-chan: Burst Serving! Kung Fu Boys ~Ramen Rebellion~	Theatrical	April 13, 2018
Crayon Shin-chan	TV Asahi	April 13, 1992	present	Crayon Shin-chan: Honeymoon Hurricane ~The Lost Hiroshi~	Theatrical	April 19, 2019
Crayon Shin-chan	TV Asahi	April 13, 1992	present	Crayon Shin-chan: Crash! Graffiti Kingdom and Almost Four Heroes	Theatrical	September 11, 2020
Crayon Shin-chan	TV Asahi	April 13, 1992	present	Crayon Shin-chan: Shrouded in Mystery! The Flowers of Tenkazu Academy	Theatrical	July 30, 2021
Crayon Shin-chan	TV Asahi	April 13, 1992	present	Crayon Shin-chan: Mononoke Ninja Chinpūden	Theatrical	April 22, 2022
Crayon Shin-chan	TV Asahi	April 13, 1992	present	New Dimension! Crayon Shin-chan the Movie: Battle of Supernatural Powers ~Flying Sushi~	Theatrical	August 4, 2023
Crayon Shin-chan	TV Asahi	April 13, 1992	present	Crayon Shin-chan the Movie: Our Dinosaur Diary	Theatrical	August 9, 2024
Crayon Shin-chan	TV Asahi	April 13, 1992	present	Crayon Shin-chan the Movie: Super Hot! The Spicy Kasukabe Dancers	Theatrical	August 8, 2025
The Crocodile Hunter	Animal Planet; Discovery Channel	October 25, 1996	September 4, 2007	The Crocodile Hunter: Collision Course	Theatrical	July 12, 2002
Cutie Honey	TV Asahi	October 13, 1973	March 30, 1974	Cutie Honey	Theatrical	May 29, 2004
Cutie Honey	TV Asahi	October 13, 1973	March 30, 1974	Cutie Honey: Tears	Theatrical	October 1, 2016
Cyber Team in Akihabara	TBS; Anime Network	April 4, 1998	September 26, 1998	Cyber Team in Akihabara: 2011 Summer Vacation	Theatrical	August 14, 1999
Cyborg 009	TV Asahi; TV Tokyo	April 5, 1968	October 13, 2002	Cyborg 009: Legend of the Super Galaxy	Theatrical	December 20, 1980
Dad's Army	BBC1	July 31, 1968	November 13, 1977	Dad's Army (1971)	Theatrical	March 12, 1971
Dad's Army	BBC1	July 31, 1968	November 13, 1977	Dad's Army (2016)	Theatrical	February 5, 2016
Dark Shadows	ABC	June 27, 1966	April 2, 1971	House of Dark Shadows	Theatrical	October 28, 1970
Dark Shadows	ABC	June 27, 1966	April 2, 1971	Night of Dark Shadows	Theatrical	August 4, 1971
Dark Shadows	ABC	June 27, 1966	April 2, 1971	Dark Shadows	Theatrical	May 11, 2012
Dead Like Me	Showtime	June 27, 2003	October 31, 2004	Dead Like Me: Life After Death	Direct-to-video	February 17, 2009
Deadwood	HBO	March 21, 2004	August 27, 2006	Deadwood: The Movie	Television	May 31, 2019
Densha Otoko	Fuji TV	July 7, 2005	September 22, 2005	Densha Otoko	Theatrical	June 4, 2005
Digimon Adventure	Fuji TV	March 7, 1999	March 26, 2000	Digimon Adventure tri.	Theatrical	November 21, 2015 – May 5, 2018
Digimon Adventure	Fuji TV	March 7, 1999	March 26, 2000	Digimon Adventure: Last Evolution Kizuna	Theatrical	February 21, 2020
Digimon Adventure 02	Fuji TV	April 2, 2000	March 25, 2001	Digimon Adventure 02: Digimon Hurricane Touchdown!! Supreme Evolution!! The Golden Digimentals	Theatrical	July 8, 2000
Digimon Adventure 02	Fuji TV	April 2, 2000	March 25, 2001	Digimon Adventure 02: The Beginning	Theatrical	October 5, 2023
Digimon Tamers	Fuji TV	April 1, 2001	March 31, 2002	Digimon Tamers: Battle of Adventurers	Theatrical	July 14, 2001
Dirty Sanchez	MTV	July 2, 2003	October 20, 2008	Dirty Sanchez: The Movie	Theatrical	September 22, 2006
Doctor Who	BBC One	November 23, 1963	present	Dr. Who and the Daleks	Theatrical	August 23, 1965
Doctor Who	BBC One	November 23, 1963	present	Daleks' Invasion Earth 2150 A.D.	Theatrical	August 5, 1966
Doctor Who	BBC One	November 23, 1963	present	Doctor Who	Television	May 12, 1996
Doctor Who	BBC One	November 23, 1963	present	An Adventure in Space and Time	Television	November 21, 2013
Dog of Flanders	Fuji TV	January 5, 1975	December 28, 1975	The Dog of Flanders: The Movie	Theatrical	March 15, 1997
Dogtanian and the Three Muskehounds	MBS (Japan); Televisión Española (Spain)	October 9, 1981	March 26, 1982	Dogtanian and the Three Muskehounds	Theatrical	June 25, 2021
DokiDoki! PreCure	ABC	February 3, 2013	January 26, 2014	DokiDoki! PreCure the Movie: Mana's Getting Married!!? The Dress of Hope Tied to the Future!	Theatrical	October 26, 2013
Doomwatch	BBC One	February 9, 1970	August 14, 1972	Doomwatch	Theatrical	March 1972
Dora the Explorer	Nickelodeon	August 14, 2000	August 9, 2019	Dora and the Lost City of Gold	Theatrical	August 9, 2019
Dora the Explorer	Nickelodeon	August 14, 2000	August 9, 2019	Dora and the Search for Sol Dorado	Streaming; Television	July 2, 2025
Doraemon	TV Asahi	April 1, 1973; April 2, 1979; April 15, 2005	September 30, 1973; March 18, 2005 present	Doraemon: Nobita's Dinosaur	Theatrical	March 15, 1980
Doraemon	TV Asahi	April 1, 1973; April 2, 1979; April 15, 2005	September 30, 1973; March 18, 2005 present	Doraemon: The Records of Nobita, Spaceblazer	Theatrical	March 14, 1981
Doraemon	TV Asahi	April 1, 1973; April 2, 1979; April 15, 2005	September 30, 1973; March 18, 2005 present	Doraemon: Nobita and the Haunts of Evil	Theatrical	March 13, 1982
Doraemon	TV Asahi	April 1, 1973; April 2, 1979; April 15, 2005	September 30, 1973; March 18, 2005 present	Doraemon: Nobita and the Castle of the Undersea Devil	Theatrical	March 12, 1983
Doraemon	TV Asahi	April 1, 1973; April 2, 1979; April 15, 2005	September 30, 1973; March 18, 2005 present	Doraemon: Nobita's Great Adventure into the Underworld	Theatrical	March 17, 1984
Doraemon	TV Asahi	April 1, 1973; April 2, 1979; April 15, 2005	September 30, 1973; March 18, 2005 present	Doraemon: Nobita's Little Star Wars	Theatrical	March 16, 1985
Doraemon	TV Asahi	April 1, 1973; April 2, 1979; April 15, 2005	September 30, 1973; March 18, 2005 present	Doraemon: Nobita and the Steel Troops	Theatrical	March 15, 1986
Doraemon	TV Asahi	April 1, 1973; April 2, 1979; April 15, 2005	September 30, 1973; March 18, 2005 present	Doraemon: Nobita and the Knights on Dinosaurs	Theatrical	March 14, 1987
Doraemon	TV Asahi	April 1, 1973; April 2, 1979; April 15, 2005	September 30, 1973; March 18, 2005 present	Doraemon: The Record of Nobita's Parallel Visit to the West	Theatrical	March 12, 1988
Doraemon	TV Asahi	April 1, 1973; April 2, 1979; April 15, 2005	September 30, 1973; March 18, 2005 present	Doraemon: Nobita and the Birth of Japan	Theatrical	March 11, 1989
Doraemon	TV Asahi	April 1, 1973; April 2, 1979; April 15, 2005	September 30, 1973; March 18, 2005 present	Doraemon: Nobita and the Animal Planet	Theatrical	March 10, 1990
Doraemon	TV Asahi	April 1, 1973; April 2, 1979; April 15, 2005	September 30, 1973; March 18, 2005 present	Doraemon: Nobita's Dorabian Nights	Theatrical	March 9, 1991
Doraemon	TV Asahi	April 1, 1973; April 2, 1979; April 15, 2005	September 30, 1973; March 18, 2005 present	Doraemon: Nobita and the Kingdom of Clouds	Theatrical	March 7, 1992
Doraemon	TV Asahi	April 1, 1973; April 2, 1979; April 15, 2005	September 30, 1973; March 18, 2005 present	Doraemon: Nobita and the Tin Labyrinth	Theatrical	March 6, 1993
Doraemon	TV Asahi	April 1, 1973; April 2, 1979; April 15, 2005	September 30, 1973; March 18, 2005 present	Doraemon: Nobita's Three Visionary Swordsmen	Theatrical	March 12, 1994
Doraemon	TV Asahi	April 1, 1973; April 2, 1979; April 15, 2005	September 30, 1973; March 18, 2005 present	Doraemon: Nobita's Diary on the Creation of the World	Theatrical	March 4, 1995
Doraemon	TV Asahi	April 1, 1973; April 2, 1979; April 15, 2005	September 30, 1973; March 18, 2005 present	Doraemon: Nobita and the Galaxy Super-express	Theatrical	March 2, 1996
Doraemon	TV Asahi	April 1, 1973; April 2, 1979; April 15, 2005	September 30, 1973; March 18, 2005 present	Doraemon: Nobita and the Spiral City	Theatrical	March 8, 1997
Doraemon	TV Asahi	April 1, 1973; April 2, 1979; April 15, 2005	September 30, 1973; March 18, 2005 present	Doraemon: Nobita's Great Adventure in the South Seas	Theatrical	March 7, 1998
Doraemon	TV Asahi	April 1, 1973; April 2, 1979; April 15, 2005	September 30, 1973; March 18, 2005 present	Doraemon: Nobita Drifts in the Universe	Theatrical	March 6, 1999
Doraemon	TV Asahi	April 1, 1973; April 2, 1979; April 15, 2005	September 30, 1973; March 18, 2005 present	Doraemon: Nobita and the Legend of the Sun King	Theatrical	March 4, 2000
Doraemon	TV Asahi	April 1, 1973; April 2, 1979; April 15, 2005	September 30, 1973; March 18, 2005 present	Doraemon: Nobita and the Winged Braves	Theatrical	March 10, 2001
Doraemon	TV Asahi	April 1, 1973; April 2, 1979; April 15, 2005	September 30, 1973; March 18, 2005 present	Doraemon: Nobita and the Robot Kingdom	Theatrical	March 9, 2002
Doraemon	TV Asahi	April 1, 1973; April 2, 1979; April 15, 2005	September 30, 1973; March 18, 2005 present	Doraemon: Nobita and the Windmasters	Theatrical	March 8, 2003
Doraemon	TV Asahi	April 1, 1973; April 2, 1979; April 15, 2005	September 30, 1973; March 18, 2005 present	Doraemon: Nobita in the Wan-Nyan Spacetime Odyssey	Theatrical	March 7, 2004
Doraemon	TV Asahi	April 1, 1973; April 2, 1979; April 15, 2005	September 30, 1973; March 18, 2005 present	Doraemon: Nobita's Dinosaur 2006	Theatrical	March 4, 2006
Doraemon	TV Asahi	April 1, 1973; April 2, 1979; April 15, 2005	September 30, 1973; March 18, 2005 present	Doraemon: Nobita's New Great Adventure into the Underworld	Theatrical	March 10, 2007
Doraemon	TV Asahi	April 1, 1973; April 2, 1979; April 15, 2005	September 30, 1973; March 18, 2005 present	Doraemon: Nobita and the Green Giant Legend	Theatrical	March 8, 2008
Doraemon	TV Asahi	April 1, 1973; April 2, 1979; April 15, 2005	September 30, 1973; March 18, 2005 present	Doraemon: The Record of Nobita's Spaceblazer	Theatrical	March 7, 2009
Doraemon	TV Asahi	April 1, 1973; April 2, 1979; April 15, 2005	September 30, 1973; March 18, 2005 present	Doraemon: Nobita's Great Battle of the Mermaid King	Theatrical	March 6, 2010
Doraemon	TV Asahi	April 1, 1973; April 2, 1979; April 15, 2005	September 30, 1973; March 18, 2005 present	Doraemon: Nobita and the New Steel Troops—Winged Angels	Theatrical	March 5, 2011
Doraemon	TV Asahi	April 1, 1973; April 2, 1979; April 15, 2005	September 30, 1973; March 18, 2005 present	Doraemon: Nobita and the Island of Miracles—Animal Adventure	Theatrical	March 3, 2012
Doraemon	TV Asahi	April 1, 1973; April 2, 1979; April 15, 2005	September 30, 1973; March 18, 2005 present	Doraemon: Nobita's Secret Gadget Museum	Theatrical	March 9, 2013
Doraemon	TV Asahi	April 1, 1973; April 2, 1979; April 15, 2005	September 30, 1973; March 18, 2005 present	Doraemon: New Nobita's Great Demon—Peko and the Exploration Party of Five	Theatrical	March 8, 2014
Doraemon	TV Asahi	April 1, 1973; April 2, 1979; April 15, 2005	September 30, 1973; March 18, 2005 present	Stand by Me Doraemon	Theatrical	August 8, 2014
Doraemon	TV Asahi	April 1, 1973; April 2, 1979; April 15, 2005	September 30, 1973; March 18, 2005 present	Doraemon: Nobita's Space Heroes	Theatrical	March 7, 2015
Doraemon	TV Asahi	April 1, 1973; April 2, 1979; April 15, 2005	September 30, 1973; March 18, 2005 present	Doraemon: Nobita and the Birth of Japan 2016	Theatrical	March 5, 2016
Doraemon	TV Asahi	April 1, 1973; April 2, 1979; April 15, 2005	September 30, 1973; March 18, 2005 present	Doraemon the Movie 2017: Great Adventure in the Antarctic Kachi Kochi	Theatrical	March 4, 2017
Doraemon	TV Asahi	April 1, 1973; April 2, 1979; April 15, 2005	September 30, 1973; March 18, 2005 present	Doraemon: Nobita's Treasure Island	Theatrical	March 3, 2018
Doraemon	TV Asahi	April 1, 1973; April 2, 1979; April 15, 2005	September 30, 1973; March 18, 2005 present	Doraemon: Nobita's Chronicle of the Moon Exploration	Theatrical	March 1, 2019
Doraemon	TV Asahi	April 1, 1973; April 2, 1979; April 15, 2005	September 30, 1973; March 18, 2005 present	Doraemon: Nobita's New Dinosaur	Theatrical	August 7, 2020
Doraemon	TV Asahi	April 1, 1973; April 2, 1979; April 15, 2005	September 30, 1973; March 18, 2005 present	Stand by Me Doraemon 2	Theatrical	November 20, 2020
Doraemon	TV Asahi	April 1, 1973; April 2, 1979; April 15, 2005	September 30, 1973; March 18, 2005 present	Doraemon: Nobita's Little Star Wars 2021	Theatrical	March 4, 2022
Doraemon	TV Asahi	April 1, 1973; April 2, 1979; April 15, 2005	September 30, 1973; March 18, 2005 present	Doraemon: Nobita's Sky Utopia	Theatrical	March 3, 2023
Doraemon	TV Asahi	April 1, 1973; April 2, 1979; April 15, 2005	September 30, 1973; March 18, 2005 present	Doraemon: Nobita's Earth Symphony	Theatrical	March 1, 2024
Doraemon	TV Asahi	April 1, 1973; April 2, 1979; April 15, 2005	September 30, 1973; March 18, 2005 present	Doraemon: Nobita's Art World Tales	Theatrical	March 7, 2025
Dororo	Fuji TV	April 6, 1969	September 28, 1969	Dororo	Theatrical	March 15, 2007
Doug	Nickelodeon; ABC	August 11, 1991; September 7, 1996	January 2, 1994; June 26, 1999	Doug's 1st Movie	Theatrical	March 26, 1999
Downton Abbey	ITV	September 26, 2010	December 25, 2015	Downton Abbey	Theatrical	September 13, 2019
Downton Abbey	ITV	September 26, 2010	December 25, 2015	Downton Abbey: A New Era	Theatrical	May 20, 2022
Downton Abbey	ITV	September 26, 2010	December 25, 2015	Downton Abbey: The Grand Finale	Theatrical	September 12, 2025
Dr. Slump & Arale-chan; Dr. Slump	Fuji TV	April 8, 1981; November 26, 1997	February 19, 1986; September 22, 1999	Dr. Slump: "Hoyoyo!" Space Adventure	Theatrical	July 10, 1982
Dr. Slump & Arale-chan; Dr. Slump	Fuji TV	April 8, 1981; November 26, 1997	February 19, 1986; September 22, 1999	Dr. Slump and Arale-chan: Hoyoyo! The Great Race Around the World	Theatrical	March 13, 1983
Dr. Slump & Arale-chan; Dr. Slump	Fuji TV	April 8, 1981; November 26, 1997	February 19, 1986; September 22, 1999	Dr. Slump and Arale-chan: Hoyoyo! The Secret of Nanaba Castle	Theatrical	December 22, 1984
Dr. Slump & Arale-chan; Dr. Slump	Fuji TV	April 8, 1981; November 26, 1997	February 19, 1986; September 22, 1999	Dr. Slump and Arale-chan: N-cha! Clear Skies Over Penguin Village	Theatrical	March 6, 1993
Dr. Slump & Arale-chan; Dr. Slump	Fuji TV	April 8, 1981; November 26, 1997	February 19, 1986; September 22, 1999	Doctor Slump: Arale's Surprise Burn	Theatrical	March 6, 1999
Dragnet (1951)	NBC	December 16, 1951	August 23, 1959	Dragnet (1954)	Theatrical	September 4, 1954
Dragnet (1951, 1967)	NBC	December 16, 1951	April 16, 1970	Dragnet (1987)	Theatrical	June 26, 1987
Dragon Ball	Fuji TV	February 26, 1986	April 19, 1989	Curse of the Blood Rubies	Theatrical	December 20, 1986
Dragon Ball	Fuji TV	February 26, 1986	April 19, 1989	Sleeping Princess in Devil's Castle	Theatrical	July 18, 1987
Dragon Ball	Fuji TV	February 26, 1986	April 19, 1989	Mystical Adventure	Theatrical	July 9, 1988
Dragon Ball	Fuji TV	February 26, 1986	April 19, 1989	The Path to Power	Theatrical	March 4, 1996
Dragon Ball	Fuji TV	February 26, 1986	April 19, 1989	Dragonball Evolution	Theatrical	March 10, 2009
Dragon Ball Z	Fuji TV	April 26, 1989	January 31, 1996	Dead Zone	Theatrical	July 15, 1989
Dragon Ball Z	Fuji TV	April 26, 1989	January 31, 1996	The World's Strongest	Theatrical	March 10, 1990
Dragon Ball Z	Fuji TV	April 26, 1989	January 31, 1996	The Tree of Might	Theatrical	July 7, 1990
Dragon Ball Z	Fuji TV	April 26, 1989	January 31, 1996	Lord Slug	Theatrical	March 9, 1991
Dragon Ball Z	Fuji TV	April 26, 1989	January 31, 1996	Cooler's Revenge	Theatrical	July 20, 1991
Dragon Ball Z	Fuji TV	April 26, 1989	January 31, 1996	The Return of Cooler	Theatrical	March 7, 1992
Dragon Ball Z	Fuji TV	April 26, 1989	January 31, 1996	Super Android 13!	Theatrical	July 11, 1992
Dragon Ball Z	Fuji TV	April 26, 1989	January 31, 1996	Broly – The Legendary Super Saiyan	Theatrical	March 6, 1993
Dragon Ball Z	Fuji TV	April 26, 1989	January 31, 1996	Bojack Unbound	Theatrical	July 10, 1993
Dragon Ball Z	Fuji TV	April 26, 1989	January 31, 1996	Broly – Second Coming	Theatrical	March 12, 1994
Dragon Ball Z	Fuji TV	April 26, 1989	January 31, 1996	Bio-Broly	Theatrical	July 9, 1994
Dragon Ball Z	Fuji TV	April 26, 1989	January 31, 1996	Fusion Reborn	Theatrical	March 4, 1995
Dragon Ball Z	Fuji TV	April 26, 1989	January 31, 1996	Wrath of the Dragon	Theatrical	July 15, 1995
Dragon Ball Z	Fuji TV	April 26, 1989	January 31, 1996	Battle of Gods	Theatrical	March 30, 2013
Dragon Ball Z	Fuji TV	April 26, 1989	January 31, 1996	Resurrection 'F'	Theatrical	April 11, 2015
Dragon Ball Super	Fuji TV	July 5, 2015	March 15, 2018	Broly	Theatrical	November 14, 2018
Dragon Ball Super	Fuji TV	July 5, 2015	March 15, 2018	Super Hero	Theatrical	June 11, 2022
Drake & Josh	Nickelodeon	January 11, 2004	September 16, 2007	Drake & Josh Go Hollywood	Television	January 6, 2006
Drake & Josh	Nickelodeon	January 11, 2004	September 16, 2007	Merry Christmas, Drake & Josh	Television	December 5, 2008
Drawn Together	Comedy Central	October 27, 2004	November 14, 2007	The Drawn Together Movie: The Movie!	Direct-to-video	March 18, 2010
DuckTales	Syndication	September 18, 1987	November 28, 1990	DuckTales the Movie: Treasure of the Lost Lamp	Theatrical	August 3, 1990
The Dudley Do-Right Show	ABC	April 27, 1969	September 6, 1970	Dudley Do-Right	Theatrical	August 27, 1999
The Dukes of Hazzard	CBS	January 26, 1979	February 8, 1985	The Dukes of Hazzard	Theatrical	August 5, 2005
The Dukes of Hazzard	CBS	January 26, 1979	February 8, 1985	The Dukes of Hazzard: The Beginning	Direct-to-video	March 4, 2007
Ed, Edd n Eddy	Cartoon Network	January 4, 1999	June 29, 2008	Ed, Edd n Eddy's Big Picture Show	Television	November 8, 2009
Edge of Darkness	BBC Two	November 4, 1985	December 9, 1985	Edge of Darkness	Theatrical	January 29, 2010
Entourage	HBO	July 18, 2004	September 11, 2011	Entourage	Theatrical	June 3, 2015
The Equalizer	CBS	September 18, 1985	August 24, 1989	The Equalizer	Theatrical	September 26, 2014
The Equalizer	CBS	September 18, 1985	August 24, 1989	The Equalizer 2	Theatrical	July 20, 2018
The Equalizer	CBS	September 18, 1985	August 24, 1989	The Equalizer 3	Theatrical	September 1, 2023
ESPer Mami	TV Asahi	April 7, 1987	October 26, 1989	ESPer Mami: Hoshizora no Dancing Doll	Theatrical	March 12, 1988
Esperanza	ABS-CBN	February 17, 1997	July 30, 1999	Esperanza	Theatrical	December 25, 1999
Even Stevens	Disney Channel	June 17, 2000	June 2, 2003	The Even Stevens Movie	Television	June 13, 2003
E.U. Lives of Omission	TVB Jade	February 16, 2009; August 1, 2011	March 27, 2009; September 9, 2011	Turning Point	Theatrical	August 13, 2009
E.U. Lives of Omission	TVB Jade	February 16, 2009; August 1, 2011	March 27, 2009; September 9, 2011	Turning Point 2	Theatrical	December 29, 2011
The Fairly OddParents	Nickelodeon	March 30, 2001	July 26, 2017	A Fairly Odd Movie: Grow Up, Timmy Turner!	Television	July 9, 2011
The Fairly OddParents	Nickelodeon	March 30, 2001	July 26, 2017	A Fairly Odd Christmas	Television	November 29, 2012
The Fairly OddParents	Nickelodeon	March 30, 2001	July 26, 2017	A Fairly Odd Summer	Television	August 2, 2014
The Fall Guy	ABC	November 4, 1981	May 2, 1986	The Fall Guy	Theatrical	May 3, 2024
Family Guy	Fox	January 31, 1999	present	Stewie Griffin: The Untold Story	Direct-to-video	September 27, 2005
Fat Albert and the Cosby Kids	CBS; Syndication	September 9, 1972	August 10, 1985	Fat Albert	Theatrical	December 25, 2004
Felix the Cat	Syndication	October 2, 1958	May 13, 1960	Felix the Cat: The Movie	Theatrical	October 1, 1988
Firefly	Fox	September 20, 2002	December 20, 2002	Serenity	Theatrical	September 30, 2005
Fireman Sam	CBBC; CBeebies; Channel 5	November 17, 1987	present	Fireman Sam: The Great Fire of Pontypandy	Television	November 9, 2009
Fireside Theatre	NBC	April 5, 1949	May 22, 1958	Rock All Night	Theatrical	April 24, 1957
Fist of the North Star	Fuji TV	October 11, 1984	March 5, 1987	Fist of the North Star	Theatrical	March 8, 1986
Flames	ABS-CBN	November 11, 1996	January 11, 2002	Flames: The Movie	Theatrical	July 9, 1997
Flight into Danger	CBC (Canada)	April 3, 1956		Zero Hour!	Theatrical	November 13, 1957
The Flintstones	ABC	September 30, 1960	April 1, 1966	The Man Called Flintstone	Theatrical	August 3, 1966
The Flintstones	ABC	September 30, 1960	April 1, 1966	The Jetsons Meet the Flintstones	Television	November 15, 1987
The Flintstones	ABC	September 30, 1960	April 1, 1966	The Flintstones	Theatrical	May 27, 1994
The Flintstones	ABC	September 30, 1960	April 1, 1966	The Flintstones in Viva Rock Vegas	Theatrical	April 28, 2000
The Flintstones	ABC	September 30, 1960	April 1, 1966	The Flintstones: On the Rocks	Television	November 3, 2001
The Flintstones	ABC	September 30, 1960	April 1, 1966	The Flintstones & WWE: Stone Age SmackDown!	Direct-to-video	March 10, 2015
Foster's Home for Imaginary Friends	Cartoon Network	August 13, 2004	May 3, 2009	Destination: Imagination	Television	November 27, 2008
Franklin	Family Channel; Treehouse TV	November 3, 1997	August 8, 2004	Franklin and the Green Knight	Direct-to-video	October 17, 2000
Franklin	Family Channel; Treehouse TV	November 3, 1997	August 8, 2004	Franklin's Magic Christmas	Direct-to-video	November 6, 2001
Franklin	Family Channel; Treehouse TV	November 3, 1997	August 8, 2004	Back to School with Franklin	Direct-to-video	August 19, 2003
Franklin	Family Channel; Treehouse TV	November 3, 1997	August 8, 2004	Franklin and the Turtle Lake Treasure	Direct-to-video	September 6, 2006
Fresh Pretty Cure!	TV Asahi	February 1, 2009	January 31, 2010	Fresh PreCure the Movie: The Kingdom of Toys has Lots of Secrets!?	Theatrical	October 31, 2009
The Fugitive	ABC	September 17, 1963	August 29, 1967	The Fugitive	Theatrical	August 6, 1993
The Fugitive	ABC	September 17, 1963	August 29, 1967	U.S. Marshals	Theatrical	March 6, 1998
Futari wa Pretty Cure Max Heart	TV Asahi	February 6, 2005	January 29, 2006	Futari wa Pretty Cure Max Heart The Movie	Theatrical	April 16, 2005
Futari wa Pretty Cure Max Heart	TV Asahi	February 6, 2005	January 29, 2006	Futari wa Pretty Cure Max Heart The Movie 2: Friends of Snowy Sky	Theatrical	December 10, 2005
Futurama	Fox; Comedy Central	March 28, 1999; March 23, 2008	August 10, 2003; September 4, 2013	Futurama: Bender's Big Score	Direct-to-video	November 27, 2007
Futurama	Fox; Comedy Central	March 28, 1999; March 23, 2008	August 10, 2003; September 4, 2013	Futurama: The Beast with a Billion Backs	Direct-to-video	June 24, 2008
Futurama	Fox; Comedy Central	March 28, 1999; March 23, 2008	August 10, 2003; September 4, 2013	Futurama: Bender's Game	Direct-to-video	November 3, 2008
Futurama	Fox; Comedy Central	March 28, 1999; March 23, 2008	August 10, 2003; September 4, 2013	Futurama: Into the Wild Green Yonder	Direct-to-video	February 24, 2009
Galaxy Express 999	Fuji TV	September 14, 1978	March 26, 1981	Galaxy Express 999	Theatrical	August 4, 1979
Galaxy Express 999	Fuji TV	September 14, 1978	March 26, 1981	Adieu Galaxy Express 999	Theatrical	August 1, 1981
Galaxy Express 999	Fuji TV	September 14, 1978	March 26, 1981	Galaxy Express 999: Eternal Fantasy	Theatrical	March 7, 1998
Gamba no Bouken	Nippon TV	April 7, 1975	September 29, 1975	Gamba to Kawauso no Bouken	Theatrical	July 20, 1991
Gamba no Bouken	Nippon TV	April 7, 1975	September 29, 1975	Gamba: Gamba to Nakama-tachi	Theatrical	October 10, 2015
Galileo	Fuji TV	October 15, 2007; April 15, 2013	December 17, 2007; June 17, 2013	Suspect X	Theatrical	October 4, 2008
Garfield and Friends	CBS	September 17, 1988	December 10, 1994	Garfield: The Movie	Theatrical	June 11, 2004
Garfield and Friends	CBS	September 17, 1988	December 10, 1994	Garfield: A Tail of Two Kitties	Theatrical	June 16, 2006
Garfield and Friends	CBS	September 17, 1988	December 10, 1994	Garfield Gets Real	Direct-to-video	August 9, 2007
Garfield and Friends	CBS	September 17, 1988	December 10, 1994	Garfield's Fun Fest	Direct-to-video	August 5, 2008
Garfield and Friends	CBS	September 17, 1988	December 10, 1994	Garfield's Pet Force	Direct-to-video	June 16, 2009
Garfield and Friends	CBS	September 17, 1988	December 10, 1994	The Garfield Movie	Theatrical	May 24, 2024
Garo: The Animation	TV Tokyo	October 3, 2014	March 30, 2018	Garo: Divine Flame	Theatrical	May 21, 2016
GeGeGe no Kitarō	Fuji TV	1968; 1971; 1985; 1996; 2007; 2008; 2018	1969; 1972; 1988; 1998; 2009; 2008; 2020	GeGeGe no Kitarō: The Strongest Yokai Army!! Disembark for Japan!	Theatrical	July 12, 1986
GeGeGe no Kitarō	Fuji TV	1968; 1971; 1985; 1996; 2007; 2008; 2018	1969; 1972; 1988; 1998; 2009; 2008; 2020	GeGeGe no Kitarō: Clash!! The Great Rebellion of the Dimensional Yokai	Theatrical	December 20, 1986
GeGeGe no Kitarō	Fuji TV	1968; 1971; 1985; 1996; 2007; 2008; 2018	1969; 1972; 1988; 1998; 2009; 2008; 2020	GeGeGe no Kitarō: The Great Sea Beast	Theatrical	July 6, 1996
GeGeGe no Kitarō	Fuji TV	1968; 1971; 1985; 1996; 2007; 2008; 2018	1969; 1972; 1988; 1998; 2009; 2008; 2020	Kitaro	Theatrical	April 28, 2007
GeGeGe no Kitarō	Fuji TV	1968; 1971; 1985; 1996; 2007; 2008; 2018	1969; 1972; 1988; 1998; 2009; 2008; 2020	Kitaro and the Millennium Curse	Theatrical	July 12, 2008
GeGeGe no Kitarō	Fuji TV	1968; 1971; 1985; 1996; 2007; 2008; 2018	1969; 1972; 1988; 1998; 2009; 2008; 2020	GeGeGe no Kitarō: Explosive Japan!!	Theatrical	December 20, 2008
GeGeGe no Kitarō	Fuji TV	1968; 1971; 1985; 1996; 2007; 2008; 2018	1969; 1972; 1988; 1998; 2009; 2008; 2020	The Birth of Kitaro: The Mystery of GeGeGe	Theatrical	November 17, 2023
George and Mildred	ITV	September 6, 1976	December 25, 1979	George and Mildred	Theatrical	July 27, 1980
George of the Jungle	ABC	September 9, 1967	December 30, 1967	George of the Jungle	Theatrical	July 16, 1997
George of the Jungle	ABC	September 9, 1967	December 30, 1967	George of the Jungle 2	Direct-to-video	October 21, 2003
Get Smart	NBC; CBS	September 18, 1965	May 15, 1970	The Nude Bomb	Theatrical	May 9, 1980
Get Smart	NBC; CBS	September 18, 1965	May 15, 1970	Get Smart	Theatrical	June 20, 2008
Get Smart	NBC; CBS	September 18, 1965	May 15, 1970	Get Smart's Bruce and Lloyd: Out of Control	Direct-to-video	July 1, 2008
Ghost Sweeper Mikami	TV Asahi	April 11, 1993	March 6, 1994	Ghost Sweeper Mikami: The Great Paradise Battle!!	Theatrical	August 24, 1994
G.I. Joe: A Real American Hero	Syndication	September 12, 1983	November 20, 1986	G.I. Joe: The Movie	Direct-to-video	April 20, 1987
Gidget	ABC	September 15, 1965	April 21, 1966	Gidget Grows Up	Television	December 30, 1969
Gidget	ABC	September 15, 1965	April 21, 1966	Gidget Gets Married	Television	January 4, 1972
Gidget	ABC	September 15, 1965	April 21, 1966	Gidget Makes the Wrong Connection	Television	November 18, 1972
Gidget	ABC	September 15, 1965	April 21, 1966	Gidget's Summer Reunion	Television	June 1, 1985
Gimik	ABS-CBN	June 15, 1996	February 13, 1999	Gimik: The Reunion	Theatrical	April 28, 1999
Gokusen	Nippon TV	April 17, 2002	March 28, 2009	Gokusen: The Movie	Theatrical	July 11, 2009
The Gong Show	NBC; Syndication; ABC	June 14, 1976; June 22, 2017	September 15, 1989; August 30, 2018	The Gong Show Movie	Theatrical	May 23, 1980
Good Luck Charlie	Disney Channel	April 4, 2010	February 16, 2014	Good Luck Charlie, It's Christmas!	Television	December 2, 2011
Goof Troop	Syndication	September 5, 1992	December 5, 1992	A Goofy Movie	Theatrical	April 7, 1995
Goof Troop	Syndication	September 5, 1992	December 5, 1992	An Extremely Goofy Movie	Direct-to-video	February 29, 2000
Gran Hermano	Telecinco	April 23, 2000	July 21, 2000	El gran marciano	Theatrical	February 16, 2001
A Grande Família	Rede Globo	March 29, 2001	September 11, 2014	The Big Family	Theatrical	January 26, 2007
The Grim Adventures of Billy & Mandy	Cartoon Network	August 24, 2001	November 9, 2007	Billy & Mandy's Big Boogey Adventure	Television	March 30, 2007
The Grove Family	BBC Television	April 9, 1954	June 28, 1957	It's a Great Day	Theatrical	1955
Gu Gu Ganmo	Fuji TV	March 18, 1984	March 17, 1985	Gu Gu Ganmo	Theatrical	March 16, 1985
Hamtaro	TV Tokyo	July 7, 2000	March 31, 2006	Hamtaro: Adventures in Ham-Ham Land	Theatrical	December 15, 2001
Hamtaro	TV Tokyo	July 7, 2000	March 31, 2006	Hamtaro: The Captive Princess	Theatrical	December 14, 2002
Hamtaro	TV Tokyo	July 7, 2000	March 31, 2006	Hamtaro: Miracle in Aurora Valley	Theatrical	December 13, 2003
Hamtaro	TV Tokyo	July 7, 2000	March 31, 2006	Hamtaro and the Demon of the Picture Book Tower	Theatrical	December 23, 2004
Hannah Montana	Disney Channel	March 24, 2006	January 16, 2011	Hannah Montana: The Movie	Theatrical	April 10, 2009
The Haunted House	Tooniverse	July 20, 2016	present	The Haunted House: The Secret of the Cave	Theatrical	July 25, 2018
The Haunted House	Tooniverse	July 20, 2016	present	The Haunted House: The Sky Goblin VS Jormungandr	Theatrical	December 19, 2019
The Haunted House	Tooniverse	July 20, 2016	present	The Haunted House: The Dimensional Goblin and the Seven Worlds	Theatrical	December 14, 2022
He-Man and the Masters of the Universe	Syndication	September 26, 1983	November 21, 1985	The Secret of the Sword	Theatrical	March 22, 1985
He-Man and the Masters of the Universe	Syndication	September 26, 1983	November 21, 1985	Masters of the Universe	Theatrical	August 7, 1987
HeartCatch PreCure!	TV Asahi	February 7, 2010	January 30, 2011	HeartCatch PreCure! the Movie: Fashion Show in the Flower Capital... Really?!	Theatrical	October 30, 2010
Heathcliff	Syndication	September 5, 1984	January 12, 1988	Heathcliff: The Movie	Theatrical	January 17, 1986
Hell Teacher Nūbē	TV Asahi	April 13, 1996	August 7, 1997	Jigoku Sensei Nūbē: Gozen 0 toki Nūbē Shisu	Theatrical	July 6, 1996
Hell Teacher Nūbē	TV Asahi	April 13, 1996	August 7, 1997	Jigoku Sensei Nūbē: Kyoufu no Natsu Yasumi! Asashi no Uni no Gensetsu	Theatrical	March 8, 1997
Hercules: The Legendary Journeys	Syndication	January 16, 1995	November 22, 1999	Hercules and Xena – The Animated Movie: The Battle for Mount Olympus	Direct-to-video	January 6, 1998
Here Comes the Grump	NBC	September 6, 1969	April 25, 1970	A Wizard's Tale	Theatrical	March 1, 2018
Hey Arnold!	Nickelodeon	October 7, 1996	June 8, 2004	Hey Arnold!: The Movie	Theatrical	June 28, 2002
Hey Arnold!	Nickelodeon	October 7, 1996	June 8, 2004	Hey Arnold!: The Jungle Movie	Television	November 24, 2017
Hiatari Ryōkō!	Nippon TV	March 22, 1987	March 20, 1988	Hiatari Ryōkō! Ka - su - mi: Yume no Naka ni Kimi ga Ita	Theatrical	October 1, 1988
Hilda	Netflix	September 21, 2018	December 7, 2023	Hilda and the Mountain King	Streaming	December 30, 2021
Home Along Da Riles	ABS-CBN	December 23, 1992	August 10, 2003	Home Along Da Riles: The Movie	Theatrical	August 26, 1993
Home Along Da Riles	ABS-CBN	December 23, 1992	August 10, 2003	Home Along Da Riles 2	Theatrical	May 28, 1997
The Honeymooners	CBS	October 1, 1955	September 22, 1956	The Honeymooners	Theatrical	June 10, 2005
Horrid Henry	CITV	October 31, 2006	May 17, 2019	Horrid Henry: The Movie	Theatrical	July 29, 2011
H.R. Pufnstuf	NBC	September 6, 1969	December 27, 1969	Pufnstuf	Theatrical	June 15, 1970
House of Mouse	ABC	January 13, 2001	October 24, 2003	Mickey's Magical Christmas: Snowed in at the House of Mouse	Direct-to-video	November 6, 2001
House of Mouse	ABC	January 13, 2001	October 24, 2003	Mickey's House of Villains	Direct-to-video	September 3, 2002
I Spy	NBC	September 15, 1965	April 15, 1968	I Spy	Theatrical	November 1, 2002
Ikkyū-san	TV Asahi	October 15, 1975	June 28, 1982	Clever Ikkyu & Naughty Princess	Theatrical	April 30, 2014
I'm Alan Partridge	BBC2	November 3, 1997	December 16, 2002	Alan Partridge: Alpha Papa	Theatrical	August 7, 2013
The Inbetweeners	E4	May 1, 2008	October 18, 2010	The Inbetweeners Movie	Theatrical	August 17, 2011
The Inbetweeners	E4	May 1, 2008	October 18, 2010	The Inbetweeners 2	Theatrical	August 6, 2014
Inspector Gadget	Syndication	September 12, 1983	February 1, 1986	Inspector Gadget	Theatrical	July 23, 1999
Inspector Gadget	Syndication	September 12, 1983	February 1, 1986	Inspector Gadget 2	Direct-to-video	March 11, 2003
Inspector Gadget	Syndication	September 12, 1983	February 1, 1986	Inspector Gadget's Biggest Caper Ever	Direct-to-video	September 6, 2005
Initial D	Fuji TV; Animax	April 18, 1998; October 14, 1999; April 17, 2004; November 9, 2012; May 16, 2014	December 5, 1998; January 6, 2000; February 18, 2006; May 10, 2013; June 22, 2014	Initial D Third Stage	Theatrical	January 13, 2001
Initial D	Fuji TV; Animax	April 18, 1998; October 14, 1999; April 17, 2004; November 9, 2012; May 16, 2014	December 5, 1998; January 6, 2000; February 18, 2006; May 10, 2013; June 22, 2014	Initial D	Theatrical	June 23, 2005
Initial D	Fuji TV; Animax	April 18, 1998; October 14, 1999; April 17, 2004; November 9, 2012; May 16, 2014	December 5, 1998; January 6, 2000; February 18, 2006; May 10, 2013; June 22, 2014	New Initial D the Movie - Legend 1: Awakening	Theatrical	August 23, 2014
Initial D	Fuji TV; Animax	April 18, 1998; October 14, 1999; April 17, 2004; November 9, 2012; May 16, 2014	December 5, 1998; January 6, 2000; February 18, 2006; May 10, 2013; June 22, 2014	New Initial D the Movie - Legend 2: Racer	Theatrical	May 23, 2015
Initial D	Fuji TV; Animax	April 18, 1998; October 14, 1999; April 17, 2004; November 9, 2012; May 16, 2014	December 5, 1998; January 6, 2000; February 18, 2006; May 10, 2013; June 22, 2014	New Initial D the Movie - Legend 3: Dream	Theatrical	February 6, 2016
Inuyasha	NNS (ytv)	October 16, 2000	September 13, 2004	Inuyasha the Movie: Affections Touching Across Time	Theatrical	December 15, 2001
Inuyasha	NNS (ytv)	October 16, 2000	September 13, 2004	Inuyasha the Movie: The Castle Beyond the Looking Glass	Theatrical	December 21, 2002
Inuyasha	NNS (ytv)	October 16, 2000	September 13, 2004	Inuyasha the Movie: Swords of an Honorable Ruler	Theatrical	December 20, 2003
Inuyasha	NNS (ytv)	October 16, 2000	September 13, 2004	Inuyasha the Movie: Fire on the Mystic Island	Theatrical	December 23, 2004
Invader Zim	Nickelodeon	March 30, 2001	August 19, 2006	Invader Zim: Enter the Florpus!	Streaming	August 16, 2019
Jackass	MTV	October 1, 2000	February 3, 2002	Jackass: The Movie	Theatrical	October 25, 2002
Jackass	MTV	October 1, 2000	February 3, 2002	Jackass Number Two	Theatrical	September 22, 2006
Jackass	MTV	October 1, 2000	February 3, 2002	Jackass 3D	Theatrical	October 15, 2010
Jackass	MTV	October 1, 2000	February 3, 2002	Jackass Presents: Bad Grandpa	Theatrical	October 25, 2013
Jackass	MTV	October 1, 2000	February 3, 2002	Jackass Forever	Theatrical	February 4, 2022
Jackass	MTV	October 1, 2000	February 3, 2002	Jackass: Best and Last	Theatrical	July 26, 2026
The Jetsons	ABC (season 1); Syndication (seasons 2–3)	September 23, 1962; September 16, 1985	March 17, 1963; November 12, 1987	The Jetsons Meet the Flintstones	Television	November 15, 1987
The Jetsons	ABC (season 1); Syndication (seasons 2–3)	September 23, 1962; September 16, 1985	March 17, 1963; November 12, 1987	Rockin' with Judy Jetson	Television	September 18, 1988
The Jetsons	ABC (season 1); Syndication (seasons 2–3)	September 23, 1962; September 16, 1985	March 17, 1963; November 12, 1987	Jetsons: The Movie	Theatrical	July 6, 1990
The Jetsons	ABC (season 1); Syndication (seasons 2–3)	September 23, 1962; September 16, 1985	March 17, 1963; November 12, 1987	The Jetsons & WWE: Robo-WrestleMania!	Direct-to-video	February 28, 2017
Johnny, You're Wanted	BBC One	November 7, 1953	December 12, 1953	Johnny, You're Wanted	Theatrical	January 1956
Jonny Quest	ABC	September 18, 1964	March 11, 1965	Jonny's Golden Quest	Television	April 4, 1993
Jonny Quest	ABC	September 18, 1964	March 11, 1965	Jonny Quest vs. The Cyber Insects	Television	November 19, 1995
Jonny Quest	ABC	September 18, 1964	March 11, 1965	Tom and Jerry: Spy Quest	Direct-to-video	June 9, 2015
Justice League	Cartoon Network	November 17, 2001	May 29, 2004	Justice League vs. the Fatal Five	Direct-to-video	March 30, 2019
Justice League Unlimited	Cartoon Network	July 31, 2004	May 13, 2006	Justice League vs. the Fatal Five	Direct-to-video	March 30, 2019
Kamen Rider	MBS	April 3, 1971	February 10, 1973	Shin Kamen Rider: Prologue	Direct-to-video	February 20, 1992
Kamen Rider	MBS	April 3, 1971	February 10, 1973	Kamen Rider ZO	Theatrical	April 17, 1993
Kamen Rider	MBS	April 3, 1971	February 10, 1973	Kamen Rider J	Theatrical	April 16, 1994
Kamen Rider	MBS	April 3, 1971	February 10, 1973	Kamen Rider: The First	Theatrical	November 5, 2005
Kamen Rider	MBS	April 3, 1971	February 10, 1973	Kamen Rider: The Next	Theatrical	October 27, 2007
Kamen Rider	MBS	April 3, 1971	February 10, 1973	OOO, Den-O, All Riders: Let's Go Kamen Riders	Theatrical	April 1, 2011
Kamen Rider	MBS	April 3, 1971	February 10, 1973	Heisei Rider vs. Shōwa Rider: Kamen Rider Taisen feat. Super Sentai	Theatrical	March 29, 2014
Kamen Rider	MBS	April 3, 1971	February 10, 1973	Kamen Rider 1	Theatrical	March 26, 2016
Kamen Rider	MBS	April 3, 1971	February 10, 1973	Shin Kamen Rider	Theatrical	March 17, 2023
Kamen Rider 555	TV Asahi	January 26, 2003	January 18, 2004	Kamen Rider 555: Paradise Lost	Theatrical	August 16, 2003
Kamen Rider Agito	TV Asahi	January 28, 2001	January 27, 2002	Kamen Rider Agito the Movie: Project G4	Theatrical	September 22, 2001
Kamen Rider Blade	TV Asahi	January 25, 2004	January 23, 2005	Kamen Rider Blade: Missing Ace	Theatrical	September 11, 2004
Kamen Rider Den-O	ANN (TV Asahi)	January 28, 2007	January 20, 2008	Kamen Rider Den-O: I'm Born!	Theatrical	August 4, 2007
Kamen Rider Den-O	ANN (TV Asahi)	January 28, 2007	January 20, 2008	Kamen Rider Den-O & Kiva: Climax Deka	Theatrical	April 12, 2008
Kamen Rider Den-O	ANN (TV Asahi)	January 28, 2007	January 20, 2008	Saraba Kamen Rider Den-O: Final Countdown	Theatrical	October 4, 2008
Kamen Rider Den-O	ANN (TV Asahi)	January 28, 2007	January 20, 2008	Cho Kamen Rider Den-O & Decade Neo Generations: The Onigashima Warship	Theatrical	May 1, 2009
Kamen Rider Den-O	ANN (TV Asahi)	January 28, 2007	January 20, 2008	Kamen Rider × Kamen Rider × Kamen Rider The Movie: Cho-Den-O Trilogy	Theatrical	May 25, 2010 – June 19, 2010
Kamen Rider Den-O	ANN (TV Asahi)	January 28, 2007	January 20, 2008	OOO, Den-O, All Riders: Let's Go Kamen Riders	Theatrical	April 1, 2011
Kamen Rider Hibiki	TV Asahi	January 30, 2005	January 22, 2006	Kamen Rider Hibiki & The Seven Senki	Theatrical	September 3, 2005
Kamen Rider Kabuto	ANN (TV Asahi)	January 29, 2006	January 21, 2007	Kamen Rider Kabuto: God Speed Love	Theatrical	August 5, 2006
Kamen Rider Kiva	ANN (TV Asahi)	January 27, 2008	January 18, 2009	Kamen Rider Den-O & Kiva: Climax Deka	Theatrical	April 12, 2007
Kamen Rider Kiva	ANN (TV Asahi)	January 27, 2008	January 18, 2009	Kamen Rider Kiva: King of the Castle in the Demon World	Theatrical	August 9, 2008
Kamen Rider Ryuki	ANN (TV Asahi)	February 3, 2002	January 19, 2003	Kamen Rider Ryuki: Episode Final	Theatrical	August 17, 2002
Kath & Kim	ABC	May 16, 2002	November 25, 2004	Da Kath & Kim Code	Television	November 27, 2005
Kath & Kim	Seven Network	August 19, 2007	October 14, 2007	Kath & Kimderella	Theatrical	September 6, 2012
Keep Running	ZRTG	October 10, 2014	present	Running Man	Theatrical	January 30, 2015
Keroro Gunsō	TV Tokyo	April 3, 2004	April 3, 2011	Keroro Gunsō the Super Movie	Theatrical	March 1, 2006
Keroro Gunsō	TV Tokyo	April 3, 2004	April 3, 2011	Chō Gekijōban Keroro Gunsō 2: Shinkai no Princess de Arimasu!	Theatrical	March 17, 2007
Keroro Gunsō	TV Tokyo	April 3, 2004	April 3, 2011	Keroro Gunso the Super Movie 3: Keroro vs. Keroro Great Sky Duel	Theatrical	March 1, 2008
Keroro Gunsō	TV Tokyo	April 3, 2004	April 3, 2011	Keroro Gunso the Super Movie 4: Gekishin Dragon Warriors	Theatrical	March 7, 2009
Keroro Gunsō	TV Tokyo	April 3, 2004	April 3, 2011	Keroro Gunso the Super Movie: Creation! Ultimate Keroro, Wonder Space-Time Island	Theatrical	February 27, 2010
Kim Possible	Disney Channel	June 7, 2002	September 7, 2007	Kim Possible: A Sitch in Time	Television	November 28, 2003
Kim Possible	Disney Channel	June 7, 2002	September 7, 2007	Kim Possible Movie: So the Drama	Television	April 8, 2005
Kim Possible	Disney Channel	June 7, 2002	September 7, 2007	Kim Possible	Television	February 15, 2019
Kimagure Orange Road	Nippon TV	April 6, 1987	March 7, 1988	Kimagure Orange Road: I Want to Return to That Day	Theatrical	October 1, 1988
Kimagure Orange Road	Nippon TV	April 6, 1987	March 7, 1988	Shin Kimagure Orange Road: Summer's Beginning	Theatrical	November 2, 1996
Kimba the White Lion	Fuji TV	October 6, 1965	September 28, 1966	Jungle Emperor Leo	Theatrical	August 1, 1997
The Kindaichi Case Files	Yomiuri TV; Chūkyō TV; Nippon TV	April 7, 1997; November 12, 2007	September 11, 2000; November 19, 2007	The Kindaichi Case Files	Theatrical	December 14, 1996
The Kindaichi Case Files	Yomiuri TV; Chūkyō TV; Nippon TV	April 7, 1997; November 12, 2007	September 11, 2000; November 19, 2007	The Kindaichi Case Files: Satsuriku no Deep Blue	Theatrical	August 21, 1999
Kinnikuman	Nippon TV; TV Tokyo	April 3, 1983; October 6, 1991; January 9, 2002; April 7, 2004	October 1, 1986; September 27, 1992; December 25, 2002; March 29, 2006	Kinnikuman: Stolen Championship Belt	Theatrical	July 14, 1984
Kinnikuman	Nippon TV; TV Tokyo	April 3, 1983; October 6, 1991; January 9, 2002; April 7, 2004	October 1, 1986; September 27, 1992; December 25, 2002; March 29, 2006	Great Riot! Justice Superman	Theatrical	December 22, 1984
Kinnikuman	Nippon TV; TV Tokyo	April 3, 1983; October 6, 1991; January 9, 2002; April 7, 2004	October 1, 1986; September 27, 1992; December 25, 2002; March 29, 2006	Justice Supermen vs. Ancient Supermen	Theatrical	March 16, 1985
Kinnikuman	Nippon TV; TV Tokyo	April 3, 1983; October 6, 1991; January 9, 2002; April 7, 2004	October 1, 1986; September 27, 1992; December 25, 2002; March 29, 2006	Counterattack! The Underground Space Choujins	Theatrical	July 13, 1985
Kinnikuman	Nippon TV; TV Tokyo	April 3, 1983; October 6, 1991; January 9, 2002; April 7, 2004	October 1, 1986; September 27, 1992; December 25, 2002; March 29, 2006	Hour of Triumph! Justice Superman	Theatrical	December 21, 1985
Kinnikuman	Nippon TV; TV Tokyo	April 3, 1983; October 6, 1991; January 9, 2002; April 7, 2004	October 1, 1986; September 27, 1992; December 25, 2002; March 29, 2006	Crisis in New York!	Theatrical	March 15, 1986
Kinnikuman	Nippon TV; TV Tokyo	April 3, 1983; October 6, 1991; January 9, 2002; April 7, 2004	October 1, 1986; September 27, 1992; December 25, 2002; March 29, 2006	Justice Supermen vs. Fighter Supermen	Theatrical	December 20, 1986
Kinnikuman	Nippon TV; TV Tokyo	April 3, 1983; October 6, 1991; January 9, 2002; April 7, 2004	October 1, 1986; September 27, 1992; December 25, 2002; March 29, 2006	Kinnikuman Nisei: Muscle Ginseng Competition! The Great Choujin War	Theatrical	July 20, 2002
Land of the Lost	NBC	September 7, 1974	December 4, 1976	Land of the Lost	Theatrical	June 5, 2009
Law & Order	NBC	September 13, 1990	May 24, 2010	Exiled: A Law & Order Movie	Television	November 8, 1998
The League of Gentlemen	BBC Two	January 11, 1999	October 31, 2002	The League of Gentlemen's Apocalypse	Theatrical	June 3, 2005
Leave It to Beaver	CBS; NBC	October 4, 1957	June 20, 1963	Leave It to Beaver	Theatrical	August 22, 1997
Legends of the Hidden Temple	Nickelodeon	September 11, 1993	July 3, 1995	Legends of the Hidden Temple	Television	November 26, 2016
Life with the Lyons	BBC TV / ITV	June 29, 1955	March 25, 1960	Life with the Lyons	Theatrical	May 25, 1954
Life with the Lyons	BBC TV / ITV	June 29, 1955	March 25, 1960	The Lyons in Paris	Theatrical	February 11, 1955
The Lineup	CBS	October 1, 1954	January 27, 1960	The Lineup	Theatrical	June 1, 1958
Little Bear	CBC; Treehouse TV	November 6, 1995	November 7, 2003	The Little Bear Movie	Direct-to-video	August 7, 2001
The Littles	ABC	September 10, 1983	November 2, 1985	Here Come the Littles	Theatrical	May 25, 1985
Lizzie McGuire	Disney Channel	January 12, 2001	February 14, 2004	The Lizzie McGuire Movie	Theatrical	May 2, 2003
The Lone Ranger	ABC	September 15, 1949	June 6, 1957	The Lone Ranger (1956)	Theatrical	February 25, 1956
The Lone Ranger	ABC	September 15, 1949	June 6, 1957	The Lone Ranger and the Lost City of Gold	Theatrical	June 4, 1958
The Lone Ranger	ABC	September 15, 1949	June 6, 1957	The Legend of the Lone Ranger	Theatrical	May 22, 1981
The Lone Ranger	ABC	September 15, 1949	June 6, 1957	The Lone Ranger (2013)	Theatrical	July 3, 2013
The Loud House	Nickelodeon	May 2, 2016	present	The Loud House Movie	Streaming	August 20, 2021
The Loud House	Nickelodeon	May 2, 2016	present	A Loud House Christmas	Television	November 26, 2021
The Loud House	Nickelodeon	May 2, 2016	present	No Time to Spy: A Loud House Movie	Television	June 21, 2024
Lost in Space	CBS	September 15, 1965	March 6, 1968	Lost in Space	Theatrical	April 3, 1998
Love Live!	Tokyo MX	January 6, 2013	June 29, 2014	Love Live! The School Idol Movie	Theatrical	June 13, 2015
The Lovers	ITV	October 27, 1970	November 18, 1971	The Lovers!	Theatrical	May 14, 1973
Lupin III; Lupin III Part II; Lupin III Part III; Lupin III: The Woman Called Fujiko Mine; Lupin III Part IV: The Italian Adventure; Lupin III Part V: Misadventures in France; Lupin III Part 6	Yomiuri TV; Nippon TV	October 24, 1971; October 3, 1977; March 3, 1984; April 4, 2012; August 30, 2015; April 4, 2018; October 2021	March 26, 1972; October 6, 1980; November 6, 1985; June 27, 2012; November 30, 2015; September 18, 2018 present	Lupin III: Strange Psychokinetic Strategy	Theatrical	August 3, 1974
Lupin III; Lupin III Part II; Lupin III Part III; Lupin III: The Woman Called Fujiko Mine; Lupin III Part IV: The Italian Adventure; Lupin III Part V: Misadventures in France; Lupin III Part 6	Yomiuri TV; Nippon TV	October 24, 1971; October 3, 1977; March 3, 1984; April 4, 2012; August 30, 2015; April 4, 2018; October 2021	March 26, 1972; October 6, 1980; November 6, 1985; June 27, 2012; November 30, 2015; September 18, 2018 present	The Mystery of Mamo	Theatrical	December 16, 1978
Lupin III; Lupin III Part II; Lupin III Part III; Lupin III: The Woman Called Fujiko Mine; Lupin III Part IV: The Italian Adventure; Lupin III Part V: Misadventures in France; Lupin III Part 6	Yomiuri TV; Nippon TV	October 24, 1971; October 3, 1977; March 3, 1984; April 4, 2012; August 30, 2015; April 4, 2018; October 2021	March 26, 1972; October 6, 1980; November 6, 1985; June 27, 2012; November 30, 2015; September 18, 2018 present	The Castle of Cagliostro	Theatrical	December 15, 1979
Lupin III; Lupin III Part II; Lupin III Part III; Lupin III: The Woman Called Fujiko Mine; Lupin III Part IV: The Italian Adventure; Lupin III Part V: Misadventures in France; Lupin III Part 6	Yomiuri TV; Nippon TV	October 24, 1971; October 3, 1977; March 3, 1984; April 4, 2012; August 30, 2015; April 4, 2018; October 2021	March 26, 1972; October 6, 1980; November 6, 1985; June 27, 2012; November 30, 2015; September 18, 2018 present	Legend of the Gold of Babylon	Theatrical	July 13, 1985
Lupin III; Lupin III Part II; Lupin III Part III; Lupin III: The Woman Called Fujiko Mine; Lupin III Part IV: The Italian Adventure; Lupin III Part V: Misadventures in France; Lupin III Part 6	Yomiuri TV; Nippon TV	October 24, 1971; October 3, 1977; March 3, 1984; April 4, 2012; August 30, 2015; April 4, 2018; October 2021	March 26, 1972; October 6, 1980; November 6, 1985; June 27, 2012; November 30, 2015; September 18, 2018 present	The Fuma Conspiracy	Direct-to-video	December 26, 1987
Lupin III; Lupin III Part II; Lupin III Part III; Lupin III: The Woman Called Fujiko Mine; Lupin III Part IV: The Italian Adventure; Lupin III Part V: Misadventures in France; Lupin III Part 6	Yomiuri TV; Nippon TV	October 24, 1971; October 3, 1977; March 3, 1984; April 4, 2012; August 30, 2015; April 4, 2018; October 2021	March 26, 1972; October 6, 1980; November 6, 1985; June 27, 2012; November 30, 2015; September 18, 2018 present	Farewell to Nostradamus	Theatrical	April 22, 1995
Lupin III; Lupin III Part II; Lupin III Part III; Lupin III: The Woman Called Fujiko Mine; Lupin III Part IV: The Italian Adventure; Lupin III Part V: Misadventures in France; Lupin III Part 6	Yomiuri TV; Nippon TV	October 24, 1971; October 3, 1977; March 3, 1984; April 4, 2012; August 30, 2015; April 4, 2018; October 2021	March 26, 1972; October 6, 1980; November 6, 1985; June 27, 2012; November 30, 2015; September 18, 2018 present	Lupin III: Dead or Alive	Theatrical	April 20, 1996
Lupin III; Lupin III Part II; Lupin III Part III; Lupin III: The Woman Called Fujiko Mine; Lupin III Part IV: The Italian Adventure; Lupin III Part V: Misadventures in France; Lupin III Part 6	Yomiuri TV; Nippon TV	October 24, 1971; October 3, 1977; March 3, 1984; April 4, 2012; August 30, 2015; April 4, 2018; October 2021	March 26, 1972; October 6, 1980; November 6, 1985; June 27, 2012; November 30, 2015; September 18, 2018 present	Lupin the 3rd vs. Detective Conan: The Movie	Theatrical	December 7, 2013
Lupin III; Lupin III Part II; Lupin III Part III; Lupin III: The Woman Called Fujiko Mine; Lupin III Part IV: The Italian Adventure; Lupin III Part V: Misadventures in France; Lupin III Part 6	Yomiuri TV; Nippon TV	October 24, 1971; October 3, 1977; March 3, 1984; April 4, 2012; August 30, 2015; April 4, 2018; October 2021	March 26, 1972; October 6, 1980; November 6, 1985; June 27, 2012; November 30, 2015; September 18, 2018 present	Daisuke Jigen's Gravestone	Theatrical	June 21, 2014
Lupin III; Lupin III Part II; Lupin III Part III; Lupin III: The Woman Called Fujiko Mine; Lupin III Part IV: The Italian Adventure; Lupin III Part V: Misadventures in France; Lupin III Part 6	Yomiuri TV; Nippon TV	October 24, 1971; October 3, 1977; March 3, 1984; April 4, 2012; August 30, 2015; April 4, 2018; October 2021	March 26, 1972; October 6, 1980; November 6, 1985; June 27, 2012; November 30, 2015; September 18, 2018 present	Lupin the 3rd	Theatrical	August 30, 2014
Lupin III; Lupin III Part II; Lupin III Part III; Lupin III: The Woman Called Fujiko Mine; Lupin III Part IV: The Italian Adventure; Lupin III Part V: Misadventures in France; Lupin III Part 6	Yomiuri TV; Nippon TV	October 24, 1971; October 3, 1977; March 3, 1984; April 4, 2012; August 30, 2015; April 4, 2018; October 2021	March 26, 1972; October 6, 1980; November 6, 1985; June 27, 2012; November 30, 2015; September 18, 2018 present	Goemon Ishikawa's Spray of Blood	Theatrical	February 4, 2017
Lupin III; Lupin III Part II; Lupin III Part III; Lupin III: The Woman Called Fujiko Mine; Lupin III Part IV: The Italian Adventure; Lupin III Part V: Misadventures in France; Lupin III Part 6	Yomiuri TV; Nippon TV	October 24, 1971; October 3, 1977; March 3, 1984; April 4, 2012; August 30, 2015; April 4, 2018; October 2021	March 26, 1972; October 6, 1980; November 6, 1985; June 27, 2012; November 30, 2015; September 18, 2018 present	Fujiko Mine's Lie	Theatrical	May 31, 2019
Lupin III; Lupin III Part II; Lupin III Part III; Lupin III: The Woman Called Fujiko Mine; Lupin III Part IV: The Italian Adventure; Lupin III Part V: Misadventures in France; Lupin III Part 6	Yomiuri TV; Nippon TV	October 24, 1971; October 3, 1977; March 3, 1984; April 4, 2012; August 30, 2015; April 4, 2018; October 2021	March 26, 1972; October 6, 1980; November 6, 1985; June 27, 2012; November 30, 2015; September 18, 2018 present	Lupin III: The First	Theatrical	December 6, 2019
Luther	BBC One	May 10, 2010	January 4, 2019	Luther: The Fallen Sun	Streaming	February 24, 2023
Maalaala Mo Kaya	ABS-CBN	May 15, 1991	present	Maalaala Mo Kaya: The Movie	Theatrical	June 22, 1994
The Magic Roundabout	ORTF	1965	1977	Dougal and the Blue Cat	Theatrical	December 23, 1970
The Magic Roundabout	ORTF	1965	1977	The Magic Roundabout	Theatrical	February 2, 2005
Magical Girl Lyrical Nanoha	GBS, TV Saitama, MTV, TVO, CTC, TVK	October 1, 2004	December 17, 2016	Magical Girl Lyrical Nanoha The Movie 1st	Theatrical	January 23, 2010
Magical Girl Lyrical Nanoha	GBS, TV Saitama, MTV, TVO, CTC, TVK	October 1, 2004	December 17, 2016	Magical Girl Lyrical Nanoha The Movie 2nd A's	Theatrical	July 14, 2012
Magical Girl Lyrical Nanoha	GBS, TV Saitama, MTV, TVO, CTC, TVK	October 1, 2004	December 17, 2016	Magical Girl Lyrical Nanoha: Reflection	Theatrical	July 22, 2017
Magical Girl Lyrical Nanoha	GBS, TV Saitama, MTV, TVO, CTC, TVK	October 1, 2004	December 17, 2016	Magical Girl Lyrical Nanoha: Detonation	Theatrical	October 19, 2018
Magical Princess Minky Momo	TV Tokyo	March 18, 1982	May 26, 1983	Magical Princess Minky Momo: La Ronde in my Dream	Direct-to-video	July 28, 1985
Maison Ikkoku	Fuji TV	March 26, 1986	March 2, 1988	Maison Ikkoku: Apartment Fantasy	Theatrical	October 10, 1986
Maison Ikkoku	Fuji TV	March 26, 1986	March 2, 1988	Maison Ikkoku	Television	May 12, 2007
Maison Ikkoku	Fuji TV	March 26, 1986	March 2, 1988	Maison Ikkoku: Kanketsuhen	Television	July 26, 2008
Man About the House	ITV	August 15, 1973	April 7, 1976	Man About the House	Theatrical	December 22, 1974
The Man from U.N.C.L.E.	NBC	September 22, 1964	January 15, 1968	The Man from U.N.C.L.E.	Theatrical	August 14, 2015
The Mandalorian	Disney+	November 12, 2019	April 19, 2023	The Mandalorian and Grogu	Theatrical	May 22, 2026
Mara Clara	ABS-CBN	August 17, 1992	February 14, 1997	The Mara Clara Movie	Theatrical	September 18, 1996
Martian Successor Nadesico	TV Tokyo	October 1, 1996	March 24, 1997	Martian Successor Nadesico: The Prince of Darkness	Theatrical	August 8, 1998
Maverick	ABC	September 22, 1957	April 22, 1962	Maverick	Theatrical	May 20, 1994
Mazinger Z	Fuji TV	December 3, 1972	September 1, 1974	Mazinger Z vs. Devilman	Theatrical	July 18, 1973
Mazinger Z	Fuji TV	December 3, 1972	September 1, 1974	Mazinger Z vs. The Great General of Darkness	Theatrical	July 25, 1974
Mazinger Z	Fuji TV	December 3, 1972	September 1, 1974	Mazinger Z: Infinity	Theatrical	October 28, 2017
McHale's Navy	ABC	October 11, 1962	April 12, 1966	McHale's Navy (1964)	Theatrical	June 10, 1964
McHale's Navy	ABC	October 11, 1962	April 12, 1966	McHale's Navy Joins the Air Force	Theatrical	July 9, 1965
McHale's Navy	ABC	October 11, 1962	April 12, 1966	McHale's Navy (1997)	Theatrical	April 18, 1997
Meister Eder und sein Pumuckl	Bayerischer Rundfunk; Das Erste (Germany)	September 24, 1982	March 30, 1989	Pumuckl und der blaue Klabauter	Theatrical	March 24, 1994
Melrose Place	Fox	July 8, 1992	May 24, 1999	The Unauthorized Melrose Place Story	Television	October 10, 2015
Metalocalypse	Adult Swim	August 6, 2006	October 27, 2013	Metalocalypse: Army of the Doomstar	Direct-to-video	August 22, 2023
Mi familia es un dibujo	Telefe	April 2, 1996	September 19, 1998	Dibu: The Movie	Theatrical	July 10, 1997
Mi familia es un dibujo	Telefe	April 2, 1996	September 19, 1998	Dibu 2: Nasty's Revenge	Theatrical	July 2, 1998
Mi familia es un dibujo	Telefe	April 2, 1996	September 19, 1998	Dibu 3: The Great Adventure	Theatrical	July 18, 2002
Miami Vice	NBC	September 16, 1984	January 25, 1990	Miami Vice	Theatrical	July 28, 2006
Mighty Morphin Power Rangers	Fox (Fox Kids)	August 28, 1993	November 27, 1995	Mighty Morphin Power Rangers: The Movie	Theatrical	June 30, 1995
Mighty Morphin Power Rangers	Fox (Fox Kids)	August 28, 1993	November 27, 1995	Turbo: A Power Rangers Movie	Theatrical	March 28, 1997
Mighty Morphin Power Rangers	Fox (Fox Kids)	August 28, 1993	November 27, 1995	Power Rangers	Theatrical	March 24, 2017
Miraculous: Tales of Ladybug & Cat Noir	TF1	October 19, 2015	present	Ladybug & Cat Noir: The Movie	Theatrical	July 5, 2023
Mission: Impossible	CBS	September 17, 1966	March 30, 1973	Mission: Impossible	Theatrical	May 22, 1996
Mission: Impossible	CBS	September 17, 1966	March 30, 1973	Mission: Impossible 2	Theatrical	May 24, 2000
Mission: Impossible	CBS	September 17, 1966	March 30, 1973	Mission: Impossible III	Theatrical	May 5, 2006
Mission: Impossible	CBS	September 17, 1966	March 30, 1973	Mission: Impossible – Ghost Protocol	Theatrical	December 21, 2011
Mission: Impossible	CBS	September 17, 1966	March 30, 1973	Mission: Impossible – Rogue Nation	Theatrical	July 31, 2015
Mission: Impossible	CBS	September 17, 1966	March 30, 1973	Mission: Impossible – Fallout	Theatrical	July 27, 2018
Mission: Impossible	CBS	September 17, 1966	March 30, 1973	Mission: Impossible – Dead Reckoning Part One	Theatrical	July 12, 2023
Mission: Impossible	CBS	September 17, 1966	March 30, 1973	Mission: Impossible – The Final Reckoning	Theatrical	May 23, 2025
Mister Magoo	Syndication	November 7, 1960	February 2, 1962	Mr. Magoo	Theatrical	December 25, 1997
Mobile Police Patlabor	Unknown	October 11, 1989	September 29, 1990	Mobile Police Patlabor 2: The Movie	Theatrical	August 7, 1993
Mobile Police Patlabor	Unknown	October 11, 1989	September 29, 1990	WXIII: Patlabor the Movie 3	Theatrical	March 30, 2002
Mobile Suit Gundam	NBN	April 7, 1979	January 26, 1980	Mobile Suit Gundam: Char's Counterattack	Theatrical	March 12, 1988
Mobile Suit Gundam	NBN	April 7, 1979	January 26, 1980	Mobile Suit Gundam F91	Theatrical	March 16, 1991
Mobile Suit Gundam 00	MBS	October 6, 2007	March 29, 2009	Mobile Suit Gundam 00 the Movie: A Wakening of the Trailblazer	Theatrical	September 18, 2010
The Monkees	NBC	September 12, 1966	March 25, 1968	Head	Theatrical	November 6, 1968
The Monkees	NBC	September 12, 1966	March 25, 1968	Daydream Believers: The Monkees' Story	Television	June 28, 2000
The Mod Squad	ABC	September 24, 1968	March 1, 1973	The Mod Squad	Theatrical	March 26, 1999
Monty Python's Flying Circus	BBC One	October 5, 1969	December 5, 1974	And Now for Something Completely Different	Theatrical	September 28, 1971
Monty Python's Flying Circus	BBC One	October 5, 1969	December 5, 1974	Monty Python and the Holy Grail	Theatrical	April 3, 1975
Monty Python's Flying Circus	BBC One	October 5, 1969	December 5, 1974	Monty Python Live at the Hollywood Bowl	Theatrical	June 25, 1982
Mork & Mindy	ABC	September 14, 1978	May 27, 1982	Behind the Camera: The Unauthorized Story of Mork & Mindy	Television	April 4, 2005
Mr. Bean	ITV	January 1, 1990	December 15, 1995	Bean	Theatrical	August 2, 1997
Mr. Bean	ITV	January 1, 1990	December 15, 1995	Mr. Bean's Holiday	Theatrical	March 30, 2007
Monk	USA Network	July 12, 2002	December 4, 2009	Mr. Monk's Last Case: A Monk Movie	Streaming	December 8, 2023
Mr. Show	HBO	November 3, 1995	December 28, 1998	Run Ronnie Run	Direct-to-video	September 16, 2003
Mrs. Brown's Boys	RTÉ One; BBC One	January 1, 2011	present	Mrs. Brown's Boys D'Movie	Theatrical	June 27, 2014
Ms. Marvel	Disney+	June 8, 2022	June 13, 2022	The Marvels	Theatrical	November 10, 2023
¡Mucha Lucha!	Kids' WB	August 17, 2002	February 26, 2005	¡Mucha Lucha!: The Return of El Maléfico	Direct-to-video	October 5, 2004
Mulawin	GMA Network	August 2, 2004	March 18, 2005	Mulawin: The Movie	Theatrical	December 25, 2005
Mula sa Puso	ABS-CBN	March 10, 1997	April 9, 1999	Mula sa Puso: The Movie	Theatrical	February 10, 1999
The Munsters	CBS	September 24, 1964	May 12, 1966	Munster, Go Home!	Theatrical	August 6, 1966
The Munsters	CBS	September 24, 1964	May 12, 1966	The Mini-Munsters	Television	October 27, 1973
The Munsters	CBS	September 24, 1964	May 12, 1966	The Munsters' Revenge	Television	February 27, 1981
The Munsters	CBS	September 24, 1964	May 12, 1966	Here Come the Munsters	Television	October 31, 1995
The Munsters	CBS	September 24, 1964	May 12, 1966	The Munsters' Scary Little Christmas	Television	December 17, 1996
The Munsters	CBS	September 24, 1964	May 12, 1966	The Munsters	Direct-to-video	September 27, 2022
The Muppet Show	ITV	September 5, 1976	May 23, 1981	The Muppet Movie	Theatrical	June 22, 1979
The Muppet Show	ITV	September 5, 1976	May 23, 1981	The Great Muppet Caper	Theatrical	June 26, 1981
The Muppet Show	ITV	September 5, 1976	May 23, 1981	The Muppets Take Manhattan	Theatrical	July 13, 1984
The Muppet Show	ITV	September 5, 1976	May 23, 1981	The Muppet Christmas Carol	Theatrical	December 11, 1992
The Muppet Show	ITV	September 5, 1976	May 23, 1981	Muppet Treasure Island	Theatrical	February 16, 1996
The Muppet Show	ITV	September 5, 1976	May 23, 1981	Muppets from Space	Theatrical	July 14, 1999
The Muppet Show	ITV	September 5, 1976	May 23, 1981	It's a Very Merry Muppet Christmas Movie	Television	November 29, 2002
The Muppet Show	ITV	September 5, 1976	May 23, 1981	The Muppets' Wizard of Oz	Television	May 20, 2005
The Muppet Show	ITV	September 5, 1976	May 23, 1981	The Muppets	Theatrical	November 23, 2011
The Muppet Show	ITV	September 5, 1976	May 23, 1981	Muppets Most Wanted	Theatrical	March 21, 2014
Mystery Science Theater 3000	Comedy Central	November 24, 1988; April 14, 2017	August 9, 1999; November 22, 2018	Mystery Science Theater 3000: The Movie	Theatrical	April 19, 1996
My Favorite Martian	CBS	September 29, 1963	May 1, 1966	My Favorite Martian	Theatrical	February 12, 1999
My Little Pony	Syndication	April 14, 1984	September 25, 1987	My Little Pony: The Movie	Theatrical	June 6, 1986
My Little Pony: Friendship Is Magic	Discovery Family	October 10, 2010	October 12, 2019	My Little Pony: The Movie	Theatrical	October 6, 2017
My Little Pony: Friendship Is Magic	Discovery Family	October 10, 2010	October 12, 2019	My Little Pony: Best Gift Ever	Television	October 27, 2018
My Little Pony: Friendship Is Magic	Discovery Family	October 10, 2010	October 12, 2019	My Little Pony: Rainbow Roadtrip	Television	June 29, 2019
Nadia: The Secret of Blue Water	NHK	April 13, 1990	April 12, 1991	Nadia: The Motion Picture	Theatrical	June 29, 1991
Nanny and the Professor	ABC	January 21, 1970	December 27, 1971	Nanny and the Professor	Television	September 30, 1972
Nanny and the Professor	ABC	January 21, 1970	December 27, 1971	Nanny and the Professor and the Phantom of the Circus	Television	November 17, 1973
Naruto; Naruto: Shippuden	TXN (TV Tokyo)	2002; 2007	2007; 2017	Naruto the Movie: Ninja Clash in the Land of Snow	Theatrical	August 21, 2004
Naruto; Naruto: Shippuden	TXN (TV Tokyo)	2002; 2007	2007; 2017	Naruto the Movie: Legend of the Stone of Gelel	Theatrical	August 6, 2005
Naruto; Naruto: Shippuden	TXN (TV Tokyo)	2002; 2007	2007; 2017	Naruto the Movie: Guardians of the Crescent Moon Kingdom	Theatrical	August 5, 2006
Naruto; Naruto: Shippuden	TXN (TV Tokyo)	2002; 2007	2007; 2017	Naruto Shippuden the Movie	Theatrical	August 4, 2007
Naruto; Naruto: Shippuden	TXN (TV Tokyo)	2002; 2007	2007; 2017	Naruto Shippuden the Movie: Bonds	Theatrical	August 2, 2008
Naruto; Naruto: Shippuden	TXN (TV Tokyo)	2002; 2007	2007; 2017	Naruto Shippuden the Movie: The Will of Fire	Theatrical	August 1, 2009
Naruto; Naruto: Shippuden	TXN (TV Tokyo)	2002; 2007	2007; 2017	Naruto Shippuden the Movie: The Lost Tower	Theatrical	July 31, 2010
Naruto; Naruto: Shippuden	TXN (TV Tokyo)	2002; 2007	2007; 2017	Naruto the Movie: Blood Prison	Theatrical	July 27, 2011
Naruto; Naruto: Shippuden	TXN (TV Tokyo)	2002; 2007	2007; 2017	Road to Ninja: Naruto the Movie	Theatrical	July 28, 2012
Naruto; Naruto: Shippuden	TXN (TV Tokyo)	2002; 2007	2007; 2017	The Last: Naruto the Movie	Theatrical	December 6, 2014
Naruto; Naruto: Shippuden	TXN (TV Tokyo)	2002; 2007	2007; 2017	Boruto: Naruto the Movie	Theatrical	August 7, 2015
The New Batman Adventures	Kids' WB	September 13, 1997	January 16, 1999	Batman: Mystery of the Batwoman	Direct-to-video	October 21, 2003
The New Batman Adventures	Kids' WB	September 13, 1997	January 16, 1999	Batman and Harley Quinn	Direct-to-video	August 15, 2017
Niko Niko Pun	NHK Educational TV (Japan)	April 5, 1982	October 3, 1992	Umi Da! Funade Da! Nikoniko, Pun	Theatrical	January 4, 1990
Ninja Hattori-kun	TV Asahi	September 28, 1981	December 25, 1987	Ninja Hattori-kun: Nin Nin Furusato Daisakusen no Maki	Theatrical	March 12, 1983
Ninja Hattori-kun	TV Asahi	September 28, 1981	December 25, 1987	Ninja Hattori-kun + Perman: ESP Wars	Theatrical	March 17, 1984
Ninja Hattori-kun	TV Asahi	September 28, 1981	December 25, 1987	Ninja Hattori-kun + Perman: Ninja Beast Jippō vs. Miracle Egg	Theatrical	March 16, 1985
Ninja Hattori-kun	TV Asahi	September 28, 1981	December 25, 1987	Nin x Nin: Ninja Hattori-kun, the Movie	Theatrical	August 28, 2004
Ninjago: Masters of Spinjitzu	Cartoon Network	January 14, 2011	October 1, 2022	The Lego Ninjago Movie	Theatrical	September 22, 2017
Number 96	The 0-10 Network	March 13, 1972	August 11, 1977	Number 96	Theatrical	May 1974
Ober Da Bakod	GMA Network	September 14, 1992	May 27, 1997	Ober Da Bakod: The Movie	Theatrical	June 22, 1994
Ober Da Bakod	GMA Network	September 14, 1992	May 27, 1997	Ober Da Bakod 2	Theatrical	October 18, 1996
The Office	BBC Two; BBC One	July 9, 2001	December 27, 2003	David Brent: Life on the Road	Theatrical	August 19, 2016
Oggy and the Cockroaches	France 3	September 6, 1998	January 30, 2019	Oggy and the Cockroaches: The Movie	Theatrical	August 7, 2013
Ohayō! Spank	TV Tokyo	March 7, 1981	May 29, 1982	Ohayō! Spank	Theatrical	March 13, 1982
Okay Ka, Fairy Ko!	IBC; ABS-CBN; GMA Network	November 26, 1987	April 3, 1997	Okay Ka, Fairy Ko!: The Movie	Theatrical	December 25, 1991
Okay Ka, Fairy Ko!	IBC; ABS-CBN; GMA Network	November 26, 1987	April 3, 1997	Okay Ka, Fairy Ko!: Part 2	Theatrical	December 25, 1992
Okay Ka, Fairy Ko!	IBC; ABS-CBN; GMA Network	November 26, 1987	April 3, 1997	Enteng Kabisote: Okay Ka, Fairy Ko: The Legend	Theatrical	December 25, 2004
Okay Ka, Fairy Ko!	IBC; ABS-CBN; GMA Network	November 26, 1987	April 3, 1997	Enteng Kabisote 2: Okay Ka Fairy Ko: The Legend Continues	Theatrical	December 25, 2005
Okay Ka, Fairy Ko!	IBC; ABS-CBN; GMA Network	November 26, 1987	April 3, 1997	Enteng Kabisote 3: Okay Ka, Fairy Ko: The Legend Goes On and On and On	Theatrical	December 25, 2006
Okay Ka, Fairy Ko!	IBC; ABS-CBN; GMA Network	November 26, 1987	April 3, 1997	Enteng Kabisote 4: Okay Ka, Fairy Ko: The Beginning of the Legend	Theatrical	December 25, 2007
Okay Ka, Fairy Ko!	IBC; ABS-CBN; GMA Network	November 26, 1987	April 3, 1997	Si Agimat at si Enteng Kabisote	Theatrical	December 25, 2010
Okay Ka, Fairy Ko!	IBC; ABS-CBN; GMA Network	November 26, 1987	April 3, 1997	Enteng ng Ina Mo	Theatrical	December 25, 2011
Okay Ka, Fairy Ko!	IBC; ABS-CBN; GMA Network	November 26, 1987	April 3, 1997	Si Agimat, si Enteng Kabisote at si Ako	Theatrical	December 25, 2012
Okay Ka, Fairy Ko!	IBC; ABS-CBN; GMA Network	November 26, 1987	April 3, 1997	Enteng Kabisote 10 and the Abangers	Theatrical	November 30, 2016
Oki Doki Doc	ABS-CBN	October 23, 1993	December 2, 2000	Oki Doki Doc: The Movie	Theatrical	January 10, 1996
Mo~tto! Ojamajo Doremi	TV Asahi	February 7, 1999; February 6, 2000; February 4, 2001; February 3, 2002	January 30, 2000; January 28, 2001; January 27, 2002; January 26, 2003	Mo~tto! Ojamajo Doremi: Secret of the Frog Stone	Theatrical	July 14, 2001
On the Buses	ITV	February 28, 1969	May 20, 1973	On the Buses	Theatrical	August 1, 1971
On the Buses	ITV	February 28, 1969	May 20, 1973	Mutiny on the Buses	Theatrical	June 9, 1972
On the Buses	ITV	February 28, 1969	May 20, 1973	Holiday on the Buses	Theatrical	December 26, 1973
One Foot in the Grave	BBC One	January 4, 1990	November 20, 2000	One Foot in the Algrave	Television	December 26, 1993
One Piece	Fuji TV	October 20, 1999	present	One Piece	Theatrical	March 4, 2000
One Piece	Fuji TV	October 20, 1999	present	Clockwork Island Adventure	Theatrical	March 3, 2001
One Piece	Fuji TV	October 20, 1999	present	Chopper's Kingdom on the Island of Strange Animals	Theatrical	March 2, 2002
One Piece	Fuji TV	October 20, 1999	present	Dead End Adventure	Theatrical	March 1, 2003
One Piece	Fuji TV	October 20, 1999	present	The Cursed Holy Sword	Theatrical	March 6, 2004
One Piece	Fuji TV	October 20, 1999	present	Baron Omatsuri and the Secret Island	Theatrical	March 5, 2005
One Piece	Fuji TV	October 20, 1999	present	Giant Mecha Soldier of Karakuri Castle	Theatrical	March 4, 2006
One Piece	Fuji TV	October 20, 1999	present	The Desert Princess and the Pirates: Adventures in Alabasta	Theatrical	March 3, 2007
One Piece	Fuji TV	October 20, 1999	present	Episode of Chopper Plus: Bloom in the Winter, Miracle Sakura	Theatrical	March 1, 2008
One Piece	Fuji TV	October 20, 1999	present	One Piece Film: Strong World	Theatrical	December 12, 2009
One Piece	Fuji TV	October 20, 1999	present	One Piece 3D: Straw Hat Chase	Theatrical	March 19, 2011
One Piece	Fuji TV	October 20, 1999	present	One Piece Film: Z	Theatrical	December 15, 2012
One Piece	Fuji TV	October 20, 1999	present	One Piece Film: Gold	Theatrical	July 23, 2016
One Piece	Fuji TV	October 20, 1999	present	One Piece: Stampede	Theatrical	August 9, 2019
One Piece	Fuji TV	October 20, 1999	present	One Piece Film: Red	Theatrical	August 6, 2022
Os Normais	Rede Globo	June 1, 2001	October 3, 2003	Os Normais	Theatrical	October 24, 2003
Os Normais	Rede Globo	June 1, 2001	October 3, 2003	Os Normais 2	Theatrical	August 27, 2009
Our Miss Brooks	CBS	October 3, 1952	May 11, 1956	Our Miss Brooks	Theatrical	April 24, 1956
Paw Patrol	Nick Jr. Channel	August 12, 2013	present	Paw Patrol: The Movie	Theatrical	August 20, 2021
Paw Patrol	Nick Jr. Channel	August 12, 2013	present	Paw Patrol: The Mighty Movie	Theatrical	September 29, 2023
Paw Patrol	Nick Jr. Channel	August 12, 2013	present	Paw Patrol: The Dino Movie	Theatrical	August 14, 2026
Peabody's Improbable History	ABC	November 19, 1959	1960	Mr. Peabody & Sherman	Theatrical	March 7, 2014
Pennies from Heaven	BBC One	March 7, 1978	April 11, 1978	Pennies from Heaven	Theatrical	December 11, 1981
Perman	TV Asahi	April 4, 1983	July 2, 1985	Ninja Hattori-kun + Perman: ESP Wars	Theatrical	March 17, 1984
Perman	TV Asahi	April 4, 1983	July 2, 1985	Ninja Hattori-kun + Perman: Ninja Beast Jippō vs. Miracle Egg	Theatrical	March 16, 1985
Peter Gunn	NBC; ABC	September 22, 1958	September 18, 1961	Gunn	Theatrical	June 28, 1967
Pet Pals	Rai 2 Rai Yoyo; Rai Gulp; Rai 3 CBeebies; BBC Two; CBBC	October 21, 2003	present	Pet Pals: Marco Polo's Code	Theatrical	January 22, 2010
Pet Pals	Rai 2 Rai Yoyo; Rai Gulp; Rai 3 CBeebies; BBC Two; CBBC	October 21, 2003	present	Pet Pals in Windland	Theatrical	March 27, 2014
The Phil Silvers Show	CBS	September 20, 1955	September 11, 1959	Sgt. Bilko	Theatrical	March 29, 1996
Phineas and Ferb	Disney Channel; Disney XD	August 17, 2007; June 5, 2025	June 12, 2015 present	Phineas and Ferb the Movie: Across the 2nd Dimension	Television	August 5, 2011
Phineas and Ferb	Disney Channel; Disney XD	August 17, 2007; June 5, 2025	June 12, 2015 present	Phineas and Ferb the Movie: Candace Against the Universe	Streaming	August 28, 2020
Pokémon	TV Tokyo	April 1, 1997	present	Pokémon: The First Movie	Theatrical	July 18, 1998
Pokémon	TV Tokyo	April 1, 1997	present	Pokémon: The Movie 2000	Theatrical	July 17, 1999
Pokémon	TV Tokyo	April 1, 1997	present	Pokémon 3: The Movie	Theatrical	July 8, 2000
Pokémon	TV Tokyo	April 1, 1997	present	Pokémon 4Ever	Theatrical	July 7, 2001
Pokémon	TV Tokyo	April 1, 1997	present	Pokémon Heroes	Theatrical	July 13, 2002
Pokémon	TV Tokyo	April 1, 1997	present	Pokémon: Jirachi Wish Maker	Theatrical	July 19, 2003
Pokémon	TV Tokyo	April 1, 1997	present	Pokémon: Destiny Deoxys	Theatrical	July 17, 2004
Pokémon	TV Tokyo	April 1, 1997	present	Pokémon: Lucario and the Mystery of Mew	Theatrical	July 16, 2005
Pokémon	TV Tokyo	April 1, 1997	present	Pokémon Ranger and the Temple of the Sea	Theatrical	July 15, 2006
Pokémon	TV Tokyo	April 1, 1997	present	Pokémon: The Rise of Darkrai	Theatrical	July 14, 2007
Pokémon	TV Tokyo	April 1, 1997	present	Pokémon: Giratina and the Sky Warrior	Theatrical	July 19, 2008
Pokémon	TV Tokyo	April 1, 1997	present	Pokémon: Arceus and the Jewel of Life	Theatrical	July 18, 2009
Pokémon	TV Tokyo	April 1, 1997	present	Pokémon: Zoroark: Master of Illusions	Theatrical	July 10, 2010
Pokémon	TV Tokyo	April 1, 1997	present	Pokémon the Movie: Black—Victini and Reshiram and White—Victini and Zekrom	Theatrical	July 16, 2011
Pokémon	TV Tokyo	April 1, 1997	present	Pokémon the Movie: Kyurem vs. the Sword of Justice	Theatrical	July 14, 2012
Pokémon	TV Tokyo	April 1, 1997	present	Pokémon the Movie: Genesect and the Legend Awakened	Theatrical	July 13, 2013
Pokémon	TV Tokyo	April 1, 1997	present	Pokémon the Movie: Diancie and the Cocoon of Destruction	Theatrical	July 19, 2014
Pokémon	TV Tokyo	April 1, 1997	present	Pokémon the Movie: Hoopa and the Clash of Ages	Theatrical	July 18, 2015
Pokémon	TV Tokyo	April 1, 1997	present	Pokémon the Movie: Volcanion and the Mechanical Marvel	Theatrical	July 16, 2016
Pokémon	TV Tokyo	April 1, 1997	present	Pokémon the Movie: I Choose You!	Theatrical	July 15, 2017
Pokémon	TV Tokyo	April 1, 1997	present	Pokémon the Movie: The Power of Us	Theatrical	July 13, 2018
Pokémon	TV Tokyo	April 1, 1997	present	Detective Pikachu	Theatrical	May 3, 2019
Pokémon	TV Tokyo	April 1, 1997	present	Pokémon: Mewtwo Strikes Back — Evolution	Theatrical	July 12, 2019
Pokémon	TV Tokyo	April 1, 1997	present	Pokémon the Movie: Secrets of the Jungle	Theatrical	December 25, 2020
Police Squad!	ABC	March 4, 1982	July 8, 1982	The Naked Gun: From the Files of Police Squad!	Theatrical	December 2, 1988
Police Squad!	ABC	March 4, 1982	July 8, 1982	The Naked Gun 2½: The Smell of Fear	Theatrical	June 28, 1991
Police Squad!	ABC	March 4, 1982	July 8, 1982	Naked Gun 33 1/3: The Final Insult	Theatrical	March 18, 1994
Police Squad!	ABC	March 4, 1982	July 8, 1982	The Naked Gun	Theatrical	August 1, 2025
Pororo the Little Penguin	EBS1 (South Korea)	November 27, 2003	February 16, 2021	Pororo, to the Cookie Castle	Theatrical	December 11, 2004
Pororo the Little Penguin	EBS1 (South Korea)	November 27, 2003	February 16, 2021	Pororo, The Racing Adventure	Theatrical	January 23, 2013
Pororo the Little Penguin	EBS1 (South Korea)	November 27, 2003	February 16, 2021	Pororo: Cyberspace Adventure	Theatrical	December 10, 2015
Pororo the Little Penguin	EBS1 (South Korea)	November 27, 2003	February 16, 2021	Pororo, Dinosaur Island Adventure	Theatrical	December 7, 2017
Pororo the Little Penguin	EBS1 (South Korea)	November 27, 2003	February 16, 2021	Pororo, Treasure Island Adventure	Theatrical	April 25, 2019
Pororo the Little Penguin	EBS1 (South Korea)	November 27, 2003	February 16, 2021	Pororo, Dragon Castle Adventure	Theatrical	July 28, 2022
Pororo the Little Penguin	EBS1 (South Korea)	November 27, 2003	February 16, 2021	Pororo and Friends Movie, Virus Busters	Theatrical	December 1, 2022
Pororo the Little Penguin	EBS1 (South Korea)	November 27, 2003	February 16, 2021	Pororo, Superstar Adventure	Theatrical	December 13, 2023
Porridge	BBC One	September 5, 1974	March 25, 1977	Porridge	Theatrical	August 12, 1979
Postman Pat	BBC One	September 16, 1981; September 29, 2008	December 24, 2007; March 29, 2017	Postman Pat: The Movie	Theatrical	May 23, 2014
Pound Puppies	ABC	September 13, 1986	December 19, 1987	Pound Puppies and the Legend of Big Paw	Theatrical	March 18, 1988
The Powerpuff Girls	Cartoon Network	November 18, 1998	March 25, 2005	The Powerpuff Girls Movie	Theatrical	July 3, 2002
The Proud Family	Disney Channel	September 15, 2001	August 19, 2005	The Proud Family Movie	Television	August 19, 2005
Prison Break	Fox	August 29, 2005	May 30, 2017	Prison Break: The Final Break	Television	May 24, 2009
Psych	USA Network	July 7, 2006	March 26, 2014	Psych: The Movie	Television	December 7, 2017
Psych	USA Network	July 7, 2006	March 26, 2014	Psych 2: Lassie Come Home	Streaming	July 15, 2020
Psych	USA Network	July 7, 2006	March 26, 2014	Psych 3: This Is Gus	Streaming	November 18, 2021
Puella Magi Madoka Magica	TBS	January 7, 2011	April 21, 2011	Puella Magi Madoka Magica The Movie: Beginnings	Theatrical	October 6, 2012
Puella Magi Madoka Magica	TBS	January 7, 2011	April 21, 2011	Puella Magi Madoka Magica The Movie: Eternal	Theatrical	October 13, 2012
Puella Magi Madoka Magica	TBS	January 7, 2011	April 21, 2011	Puella Magi Madoka Magica The Movie: Rebellion	Theatrical	October 26, 2013
Queen Millennia	Fuji TV	April 16, 1981	March 25, 1982	Queen Millennia	Theatrical	March 13, 1982
Rainbow Brite	Syndication	June 27, 1984	July 24, 1986	Rainbow Brite and the Star Stealer	Theatrical	November 15, 1985
Ranma ½	Fuji TV	April 15, 1989; October 20, 1989	September 16, 1989; September 25, 1992	Ranma ½: Big Trouble in Nekonron, China	Theatrical	November 2, 1991
Ranma ½	Fuji TV	April 15, 1989; October 20, 1989	September 16, 1989; September 25, 1992	Ranma ½: Nihao My Concubine	Theatrical	August 1, 1992
Ranma ½	Fuji TV	April 15, 1989; October 20, 1989	September 16, 1989; September 25, 1992	Ranma ½	Television	December 9, 2011
Ready Jet Go!	PBS Kids	February 15, 2016	May 3, 2019	Ready Jet Go! Space Camp	Television	July 20, 2023
Recess	ABC	September 13, 1997	November 5, 2001	Recess: School's Out	Theatrical	February 16, 2001
Recess	ABC	September 13, 1997	November 5, 2001	Recess Christmas: Miracle on Third Street	Direct-to-video	February 16, 2001
Recess	ABC	September 13, 1997	November 5, 2001	Recess: Taking the Fifth Grade	Direct-to-video	November 6, 2001
Recess	ABC	September 13, 1997	November 5, 2001	Recess: All Growed Down	Direct-to-video	December 9, 2003
The Real World	MTV	May 21, 1992	August 29, 2019	The Real World Movie: The Lost Season	Television	August 6, 2002
Regal Shocker	GMA Network; TV5	1985	1991	Regal Shocker: The Movie	Theatrical	December 24, 1989
Red Dwarf	BBC Two; Dave	February 15, 1988; April 10, 2009	April 5, 1999; November 16, 2017	Red Dwarf: The Promised Land	Television	April 9, 2020
The Red Green Show	CHCH-TV	January 4, 1991	April 7, 2006	Duct Tape Forever	Theatrical	April 12, 2002
Regular Show	Cartoon Network	September 6, 2010	January 16, 2017	Regular Show: The Movie	Television	November 25, 2015
Reno 911!	Comedy Central	July 23, 2003	July 8, 2009	Reno 911!: Miami	Theatrical	February 23, 2007
Rescue Heroes	Teletoon	October 2, 1999	November 18, 2003	Rescue Heroes: The Movie	Direct-to-video	November 18, 2003
Rise of the Teenage Mutant Ninja Turtles	Nickelodeon; Nicktoons	July 20, 2018	August 7, 2020	Rise of the Teenage Mutant Ninja Turtles: The Movie	Streaming	August 5, 2022
Rising Damp	ITV	September 2, 1974	May 9, 1978	Rising Damp	Theatrical	May 3, 1980
Robotech	Syndication	March 4, 1985	June 28, 1985	Robotech: The Movie	Theatrical	July 25, 1986
Robotech	Syndication	March 4, 1985	June 28, 1985	Robotech II: The Sentinels	Direct-to-video	September 1988
Robotech	Syndication	March 4, 1985	June 28, 1985	Robotech: The Shadow Chronicles	Direct-to-video	August 25, 2006
Rocky and His Friends; The Bullwinkle Show	ABC; NBC	November 19, 1959	1964	Boris and Natasha: The Movie	Television	April 17, 1992
Rocky and His Friends; The Bullwinkle Show	ABC; NBC	November 19, 1959	1964	The Adventures of Rocky and Bullwinkle	Theatrical	June 30, 2000
Rocko's Modern Life	Nickelodeon	September 18, 1993	November 24, 1996	Rocko's Modern Life: Static Cling	Streaming	August 9, 2019
Rolie Polie Olie	CBC Television	October 4, 1998	April 28, 2004	Rolie Polie Olie: The Great Defender of Fun	Television	August 13, 2002
Rolie Polie Olie	CBC Television	October 4, 1998	April 28, 2004	Rolie Polie Olie: The Baby Bot Chase	Television	June 3, 2003
Rugrats	Nickelodeon	August 11, 1991	August 1, 2004	The Rugrats Movie	Theatrical	November 20, 1998
Rugrats	Nickelodeon	August 11, 1991	August 1, 2004	Rugrats in Paris: The Movie	Theatrical	November 17, 2000
Rugrats	Nickelodeon	August 11, 1991	August 1, 2004	Rugrats Go Wild	Theatrical	June 13, 2003
Rurouni Kenshin	Fuji TV	January 10, 1996	September 8, 1998	Rurouni Kenshin: The Motion Picture	Theatrical	December 20, 1997
Sabu to Ichi Torimono Hikae	NET; MBS	October 3, 1968	September 24, 1969	Sabu to Ichi Torimono Hikae	Television	December 19, 2015
Sailor Moon; Sailor Moon Crystal	TV Asahi; Niconico; Tokyo MX	March 7, 1992; July 5, 2014	February 8, 1997; June 27, 2016	Sailor Moon R: The Movie	Theatrical	December 5, 1993
Sailor Moon; Sailor Moon Crystal	TV Asahi; Niconico; Tokyo MX	March 7, 1992; July 5, 2014	February 8, 1997; June 27, 2016	Sailor Moon S: The Movie	Theatrical	December 4, 1994
Sailor Moon; Sailor Moon Crystal	TV Asahi; Niconico; Tokyo MX	March 7, 1992; July 5, 2014	February 8, 1997; June 27, 2016	Sailor Moon SuperS: The Movie	Theatrical	December 23, 1995
Sailor Moon; Sailor Moon Crystal	TV Asahi; Niconico; Tokyo MX	March 7, 1992; July 5, 2014	February 8, 1997; June 27, 2016	Sailor Moon Eternal	Theatrical	January 8 – February 11, 2021
Sailor Moon; Sailor Moon Crystal	TV Asahi; Niconico; Tokyo MX	March 7, 1992; July 5, 2014	February 8, 1997; June 27, 2016	Sailor Moon Cosmos	Theatrical	June 9 – 30, 2023
Saint Seiya	TV Asahi	October 11, 1986	April 1, 1989	Saint Seiya: The Movie	Theatrical	July 18, 1987
Saint Seiya	TV Asahi	October 11, 1986	April 1, 1989	Saint Seiya: The Heated Battle of the Gods	Theatrical	March 12, 1988
Saint Seiya	TV Asahi	October 11, 1986	April 1, 1989	Saint Seiya: Legend of Crimson Youth	Theatrical	July 23, 1988
Saint Seiya	TV Asahi	October 11, 1986	April 1, 1989	Saint Seiya: Warriors of the Final Holy Battle	Theatrical	March 18, 1989
Saint Seiya	TV Asahi	October 11, 1986	April 1, 1989	Saint Seiya: Heaven Chapter – Overture	Theatrical	February 14, 2004
Saint Seiya	TV Asahi	October 11, 1986	April 1, 1989	Saint Seiya: Legend of Sanctuary	Theatrical	June 21, 2014
Saint Seiya	TV Asahi	October 11, 1986	April 1, 1989	Knights of the Zodiac	Theatrical	April 28, 2023
Sakigake!! Otokojuku	Fuji TV	February 25, 1988	November 14, 1988	Sakigake!! Otokojuku	Theatrical	July 23, 1988
Saturday Night Live	NBC	October 11, 1975	present	The Blues Brothers	Theatrical	June 20, 1980
Saturday Night Live	NBC	October 11, 1975	present	Wayne's World	Theatrical	February 14, 1992
Saturday Night Live	NBC	October 11, 1975	present	Coneheads	Theatrical	July 23, 1993
Saturday Night Live	NBC	October 11, 1975	present	Wayne's World 2	Theatrical	December 10, 1993
Saturday Night Live	NBC	October 11, 1975	present	It's Pat: The Movie	Theatrical	August 26, 1994
Saturday Night Live	NBC	October 11, 1975	present	Stuart Saves His Family	Theatrical	April 12, 1995
Saturday Night Live	NBC	October 11, 1975	present	A Night at the Roxbury	Theatrical	February 6, 1998
Saturday Night Live	NBC	October 11, 1975	present	Blues Brothers 2000	Theatrical	October 2, 1998
Saturday Night Live	NBC	October 11, 1975	present	Superstar	Theatrical	October 8, 1999
Saturday Night Live	NBC	October 11, 1975	present	The Ladies Man	Theatrical	October 13, 2000
Saturday Night Live	NBC	October 11, 1975	present	MacGruber	Theatrical	May 21, 2010
Saved by the Bell	NBC	August 20, 1989	May 22, 1993	Saved by the Bell: Hawaiian Style	Television	November 27, 1992
Saved by the Bell	NBC	August 20, 1989	May 22, 1993	Saved by the Bell: Wedding in Las Vegas	Television	October 7, 1994
Saved by the Bell	NBC	August 20, 1989	May 22, 1993	The Unauthorized Saved by the Bell Story	Television	September 1, 2014
Science Ninja Team Gatchaman	Fuji TV	October 1, 1972	September 29, 1974	Gatchaman	Theatrical	August 24, 2013
Scooby-Doo	CBS; ABC; Kids' WB; Cartoon Network; Boomerang	September 13, 1969	present	Scooby-Doo Meets the Boo Brothers	Television	October 18, 1987
Scooby-Doo	CBS; ABC; Kids' WB; Cartoon Network; Boomerang	September 13, 1969	present	Scooby-Doo and the Ghoul School	Television	October 16, 1988
Scooby-Doo	CBS; ABC; Kids' WB; Cartoon Network; Boomerang	September 13, 1969	present	Scooby-Doo! and the Reluctant Werewolf	Television	November 13, 1988
Scooby-Doo	CBS; ABC; Kids' WB; Cartoon Network; Boomerang	September 13, 1969	present	Scooby-Doo! in Arabian Nights	Direct-to-video	September 3, 1994
Scooby-Doo	CBS; ABC; Kids' WB; Cartoon Network; Boomerang	September 13, 1969	present	Scooby-Doo on Zombie Island	Direct-to-video	September 22, 1998
Scooby-Doo	CBS; ABC; Kids' WB; Cartoon Network; Boomerang	September 13, 1969	present	Scooby-Doo! and the Witch's Ghost	Direct-to-video	October 5, 1999
Scooby-Doo	CBS; ABC; Kids' WB; Cartoon Network; Boomerang	September 13, 1969	present	Scooby-Doo and the Alien Invaders	Direct-to-video	October 3, 2000
Scooby-Doo	CBS; ABC; Kids' WB; Cartoon Network; Boomerang	September 13, 1969	present	Scooby-Doo and the Cyber Chase	Direct-to-video	October 9, 2001
Scooby-Doo	CBS; ABC; Kids' WB; Cartoon Network; Boomerang	September 13, 1969	present	Scooby-Doo	Theatrical	June 14, 2002
Scooby-Doo	CBS; ABC; Kids' WB; Cartoon Network; Boomerang	September 13, 1969	present	Scooby-Doo! and the Legend of the Vampire	Direct-to-video	March 4, 2003
Scooby-Doo	CBS; ABC; Kids' WB; Cartoon Network; Boomerang	September 13, 1969	present	Scooby-Doo! and the Monster of Mexico	Direct-to-video	September 30, 2003
Scooby-Doo	CBS; ABC; Kids' WB; Cartoon Network; Boomerang	September 13, 1969	present	Scooby-Doo 2: Monsters Unleashed	Theatrical	March 26, 2004
Scooby-Doo	CBS; ABC; Kids' WB; Cartoon Network; Boomerang	September 13, 1969	present	Scooby-Doo! and the Loch Ness Monster	Direct-to-video	June 22, 2004
Scooby-Doo	CBS; ABC; Kids' WB; Cartoon Network; Boomerang	September 13, 1969	present	Aloha, Scooby-Doo!	Direct-to-video	February 8, 2005
Scooby-Doo	CBS; ABC; Kids' WB; Cartoon Network; Boomerang	September 13, 1969	present	Scooby-Doo! in Where's My Mummy?	Direct-to-video	December 13, 2005
Scooby-Doo	CBS; ABC; Kids' WB; Cartoon Network; Boomerang	September 13, 1969	present	Scooby-Doo! Pirates Ahoy!	Direct-to-video	September 19, 2006
Scooby-Doo	CBS; ABC; Kids' WB; Cartoon Network; Boomerang	September 13, 1969	present	Chill Out, Scooby-Doo!	Direct-to-video	September 4, 2007
Scooby-Doo	CBS; ABC; Kids' WB; Cartoon Network; Boomerang	September 13, 1969	present	Scooby-Doo! and the Goblin King	Direct-to-video	September 23, 2008
Scooby-Doo	CBS; ABC; Kids' WB; Cartoon Network; Boomerang	September 13, 1969	present	Scooby-Doo! and the Samurai Sword	Direct-to-video	April 7, 2009
Scooby-Doo	CBS; ABC; Kids' WB; Cartoon Network; Boomerang	September 13, 1969	present	Scooby-Doo! The Mystery Begins	Television	September 13, 2009
Scooby-Doo	CBS; ABC; Kids' WB; Cartoon Network; Boomerang	September 13, 1969	present	Scooby-Doo! Abracadabra-Doo	Direct-to-video	February 16, 2010
Scooby-Doo	CBS; ABC; Kids' WB; Cartoon Network; Boomerang	September 13, 1969	present	Scooby-Doo! Camp Scare	Direct-to-video	September 14, 2010
Scooby-Doo	CBS; ABC; Kids' WB; Cartoon Network; Boomerang	September 13, 1969	present	Scooby-Doo! Curse of the Lake Monster	Television	October 16, 2010
Scooby-Doo	CBS; ABC; Kids' WB; Cartoon Network; Boomerang	September 13, 1969	present	Scooby-Doo! Legend of the Phantosaur	Direct-to-video	September 6, 2011
Scooby-Doo	CBS; ABC; Kids' WB; Cartoon Network; Boomerang	September 13, 1969	present	Scooby-Doo! Music of the Vampire	Direct-to-video	March 13, 2012
Scooby-Doo	CBS; ABC; Kids' WB; Cartoon Network; Boomerang	September 13, 1969	present	Big Top Scooby-Doo!	Direct-to-video	October 9, 2012
Scooby-Doo	CBS; ABC; Kids' WB; Cartoon Network; Boomerang	September 13, 1969	present	Scooby-Doo! Mask of the Blue Falcon	Direct-to-video	February 26, 2013
Scooby-Doo	CBS; ABC; Kids' WB; Cartoon Network; Boomerang	September 13, 1969	present	Scooby-Doo! Adventures: The Mystery Map	Direct-to-video	July 23, 2013
Scooby-Doo	CBS; ABC; Kids' WB; Cartoon Network; Boomerang	September 13, 1969	present	Scooby-Doo! Stage Fright	Direct-to-video	August 20, 2013
Scooby-Doo	CBS; ABC; Kids' WB; Cartoon Network; Boomerang	September 13, 1969	present	Scooby-Doo! WrestleMania Mystery	Direct-to-video	March 25, 2014
Scooby-Doo	CBS; ABC; Kids' WB; Cartoon Network; Boomerang	September 13, 1969	present	Scooby-Doo! Frankencreepy	Direct-to-video	August 19, 2014
Scooby-Doo	CBS; ABC; Kids' WB; Cartoon Network; Boomerang	September 13, 1969	present	Scooby-Doo! Moon Monster Madness	Direct-to-video	February 17, 2015
Scooby-Doo	CBS; ABC; Kids' WB; Cartoon Network; Boomerang	September 13, 1969	present	Scooby-Doo! and Kiss: Rock and Roll Mystery	Direct-to-video	July 21, 2015
Scooby-Doo	CBS; ABC; Kids' WB; Cartoon Network; Boomerang	September 13, 1969	present	Lego Scooby-Doo! Haunted Hollywood	Direct-to-video	May 10, 2016
Scooby-Doo	CBS; ABC; Kids' WB; Cartoon Network; Boomerang	September 13, 1969	present	Scooby-Doo! and WWE: Curse of the Speed Demon	Direct-to-video	August 9, 2016
Scooby-Doo	CBS; ABC; Kids' WB; Cartoon Network; Boomerang	September 13, 1969	present	Scooby-Doo! Shaggy's Showdown	Direct-to-video	February 14, 2017
Scooby-Doo	CBS; ABC; Kids' WB; Cartoon Network; Boomerang	September 13, 1969	present	Lego Scooby-Doo! Blowout Beach Bash	Direct-to-video	July 25, 2017
Scooby-Doo	CBS; ABC; Kids' WB; Cartoon Network; Boomerang	September 13, 1969	present	Scooby-Doo! & Batman: The Brave and the Bold	Direct-to-video	January 9, 2018
Scooby-Doo	CBS; ABC; Kids' WB; Cartoon Network; Boomerang	September 13, 1969	present	Daphne & Velma	Direct-to-video	May 22, 2018
Scooby-Doo	CBS; ABC; Kids' WB; Cartoon Network; Boomerang	September 13, 1969	present	Scooby-Doo! and the Gourmet Ghost	Direct-to-video	September 11, 2018
Scooby-Doo	CBS; ABC; Kids' WB; Cartoon Network; Boomerang	September 13, 1969	present	Scooby-Doo! and the Curse of the 13th Ghost	Direct-to-video	February 5, 2019
Scooby-Doo	CBS; ABC; Kids' WB; Cartoon Network; Boomerang	September 13, 1969	present	Scooby-Doo! Return to Zombie Island	Direct-to-video	October 1, 2019
Scooby-Doo	CBS; ABC; Kids' WB; Cartoon Network; Boomerang	September 13, 1969	present	Scoob!	Theatrical	May 15, 2020
Scooby-Doo	CBS; ABC; Kids' WB; Cartoon Network; Boomerang	September 13, 1969	present	Happy Halloween, Scooby-Doo!	Direct-to-video	October 6, 2020
Scooby-Doo	CBS; ABC; Kids' WB; Cartoon Network; Boomerang	September 13, 1969	present	Scooby-Doo! The Sword and the Scoob	Direct-to-video	February 23, 2021
Scooby-Doo	CBS; ABC; Kids' WB; Cartoon Network; Boomerang	September 13, 1969	present	Straight Outta Nowhere: Scooby-Doo! Meets Courage the Cowardly Dog	Direct-to-video	September 14, 2021
Scooby-Doo	CBS; ABC; Kids' WB; Cartoon Network; Boomerang	September 13, 1969	present	Trick or Treat Scooby-Doo!	Direct-to-video	October 18, 2022
Scooby-Doo	CBS; ABC; Kids' WB; Cartoon Network; Boomerang	September 13, 1969	present	Scooby-Doo! and Krypto, Too!	Direct-to-video	September 26, 2023
SCTV	Global TV	September 21, 1976	July 17, 1984	Strange Brew	Theatrical	August 26, 1983
Sengoku Majin GoShogun	TV Tokyo	July 3, 1981	December 28, 1981	GoShogun	Theatrical	April 24, 1982
Sengoku Majin GoShogun	TV Tokyo	July 3, 1981	December 28, 1981	GoShogun: The Time Étranger	Theatrical	April 27, 1985
Sesame Street	NET	November 10, 1969	present	Sesame Street Presents Follow That Bird	Theatrical	August 2, 1985
Sesame Street	NET	November 10, 1969	present	The Adventures of Elmo in Grouchland	Theatrical	October 1, 1999
Sex and the City	HBO	June 6, 1998	February 22, 2004	Sex and the City	Theatrical	May 30, 2008
Sex and the City	HBO	June 6, 1998	February 22, 2004	Sex and the City 2	Theatrical	May 27, 2010
Shaun the Sheep	CBBC	March 5, 2007	present	Shaun the Sheep Movie	Theatrical	February 6, 2015
Shaun the Sheep	CBBC	March 5, 2007	present	A Shaun the Sheep Movie: Farmageddon	Theatrical	October 18, 2019
The Simpsons	Fox	December 17, 1989	present	The Simpsons Movie	Theatrical	July 27, 2007
The Singing Detective	BBC1	November 16, 1986	December 21, 1986	The Singing Detective	Theatrical	October 24, 2003
Skippy the Bush Kangaroo	Nine Network	February 5, 1968	May 4, 1970	The Intruders	Theatrical	December 12, 1969
Slam Dunk	TV Asahi	October 16, 1993	March 23, 1996	Slam Dunk: Conquer the Nation, Hanamichi Sakuragi!	Theatrical	July 20, 1994
Slam Dunk	TV Asahi	October 16, 1993	March 23, 1996	The First Slam Dunk	Theatrical	December 3, 2022
Smile PreCure!	TV Asahi	February 5, 2012	January 27, 2013	Smile PreCure! The Movie: Big Mismatch in a Picture Book!	Theatrical	October 27, 2012
Sonic Soldier Borgman	Nippon TV	April 13, 1988	December 21, 1988	Sonic Soldier Borgman: The Last Battle	Theatrical	September 1, 1989
The Sopranos	HBO	January 10, 1999	June 10, 2007	The Many Saints of Newark	Theatrical	October 1, 2021
Soreike! Anpanman	Nippon TV	October 3, 1988	present	The Shining Star's Tear	Theatrical	March 11, 1989
Soreike! Anpanman	Nippon TV	October 3, 1988	present	Baikinman's Counterattack	Theatrical	July 14, 1990
Soreike! Anpanman	Nippon TV	October 3, 1988	present	Fly! Fly! Chibigon	Theatrical	July 20, 1991
Soreike! Anpanman	Nippon TV	October 3, 1988	present	The Secret of Building Block Castle	Theatrical	March 14, 1992
Soreike! Anpanman	Nippon TV	October 3, 1988	present	Nosshi the Dinosaur's Big Adventure	Theatrical	July 17, 1993
Soreike! Anpanman	Nippon TV	October 3, 1988	present	The Lyrical Magical Witch's School	Theatrical	July 16, 1994
Soreike! Anpanman	Nippon TV	October 3, 1988	present	Let's Defeat the Haunted Ship!!	Theatrical	July 29, 1995
Soreike! Anpanman	Nippon TV	October 3, 1988	present	The Flying Picture Book and the Glass Shoes	Theatrical	July 13, 1996
Soreike! Anpanman	Nippon TV	October 3, 1988	present	The Pyramid of the Rainbow	Theatrical	July 28, 1997
Soreike! Anpanman	Nippon TV	October 3, 1988	present	The Palm of the Hand to the Sun	Theatrical	July 25, 1998
Soreike! Anpanman	Nippon TV	October 3, 1988	present	When the Flower of Courage Opens	Theatrical	July 24, 1999
Soreike! Anpanman	Nippon TV	October 3, 1988	present	The Tears of the Mermaid Princess	Theatrical	July 29, 2000
Soreike! Anpanman	Nippon TV	October 3, 1988	present	Gomira's Star	Theatrical	July 14, 2001
Soreike! Anpanman	Nippon TV	October 3, 1988	present	The Secret of Roll and Roura's Floating Castle	Theatrical	July 13, 2002
Soreike! Anpanman	Nippon TV	October 3, 1988	present	Ruby's Wish	Theatrical	July 12, 2003
Soreike! Anpanman	Nippon TV	October 3, 1988	present	Nyanii of the Country of Dream Cats	Theatrical	July 17, 2004
Soreike! Anpanman	Nippon TV	October 3, 1988	present	Happy's Big Adventure	Theatrical	July 16, 2005
Soreike! Anpanman	Nippon TV	October 3, 1988	present	Dolly of the Star of Life	Theatrical	July 15, 2006
Soreike! Anpanman	Nippon TV	October 3, 1988	present	Purun of the Bubble Ball	Theatrical	July 14, 2007
Soreike! Anpanman	Nippon TV	October 3, 1988	present	Rinrin the Fairy's Secret	Theatrical	July 12, 2008
Soreike! Anpanman	Nippon TV	October 3, 1988	present	Dadandan and the Twin Stars	Theatrical	July 4, 2009
Soreike! Anpanman	Nippon TV	October 3, 1988	present	Blacknose and the Magical Song	Theatrical	July 10, 2010
Soreike! Anpanman	Nippon TV	October 3, 1988	present	Rescue! Kokorin and the Star of Miracles	Theatrical	July 2, 2011
Soreike! Anpanman	Nippon TV	October 3, 1988	present	Revive Banana Island	Theatrical	July 7, 2012
Soreike! Anpanman	Nippon TV	October 3, 1988	present	Fly! The Handkerchief of Hope	Theatrical	July 6, 2013
Soreike! Anpanman	Nippon TV	October 3, 1988	present	Apple Boy and the Wishes for Everyone	Theatrical	July 5, 2014
Soreike! Anpanman	Nippon TV	October 3, 1988	present	Mija and the Magic Lamp	Theatrical	July 4, 2015
Soreike! Anpanman	Nippon TV	October 3, 1988	present	Nanda and Runda of the Toy Star	Theatrical	July 2, 2016
Soreike! Anpanman	Nippon TV	October 3, 1988	present	Bulbul's Big Treasure Hunt Adventure	Theatrical	July 1, 2017
Soreike! Anpanman	Nippon TV	October 3, 1988	present	Shine! Kurun and the Star of Life	Theatrical	June 30, 2018
Soreike! Anpanman	Nippon TV	October 3, 1988	present	Sparkle! Princess Vanilla of the Land of Ice Cream	Theatrical	June 28, 2019
Soreike! Anpanman	Nippon TV	October 3, 1988	present	Fluffy Fuwari and the Cloud Country	Theatrical	June 25, 2021
Soreike! Anpanman	Nippon TV	October 3, 1988	present	Dororin and the Transformation Carnival	Theatrical	June 24, 2022
Soreike! Anpanman	Nippon TV	October 3, 1988	present	Roborii and the Warming Present	Theatrical	June 30, 2023
Soreike! Anpanman	Nippon TV	October 3, 1988	present	Baikinman and the Picture Book of Lulun	Theatrical	June 28, 2024
South Park	Comedy Central	August 13, 1997	present	South Park: Bigger, Longer & Uncut	Theatrical	June 30, 1999
Space Adventure Cobra	Fuji TV	October 7, 1982	May 19, 1983	Space Adventure Cobra: The Movie	Theatrical	July 3, 1982
Space Battleship Yamato; Space Battleship Yamato II; Space Battleship Yamato III; Star Blazers: Space Battleship Yamato 2199; Star Blazers: Space Battleship Yamato 2202	Yomiuri TV; JNN (MBS); TXN (TV Tokyo, TV Osaka)	October 6, 1974; October 14, 1978; October 11, 1980; April 7, 2013; October 6, 2018	March 30, 1975; April 4, 1979; April 4, 1981; September 29, 2013; March 30, 2019	Space Battleship Yamato (1977)	Theatrical	August 6, 1977
Space Battleship Yamato; Space Battleship Yamato II; Space Battleship Yamato III; Star Blazers: Space Battleship Yamato 2199; Star Blazers: Space Battleship Yamato 2202	Yomiuri TV; JNN (MBS); TXN (TV Tokyo, TV Osaka)	October 6, 1974; October 14, 1978; October 11, 1980; April 7, 2013; October 6, 2018	March 30, 1975; April 4, 1979; April 4, 1981; September 29, 2013; March 30, 2019	Farewell to Space Battleship Yamato	Theatrical	July 14, 1978
Space Battleship Yamato; Space Battleship Yamato II; Space Battleship Yamato III; Star Blazers: Space Battleship Yamato 2199; Star Blazers: Space Battleship Yamato 2202	Yomiuri TV; JNN (MBS); TXN (TV Tokyo, TV Osaka)	October 6, 1974; October 14, 1978; October 11, 1980; April 7, 2013; October 6, 2018	March 30, 1975; April 4, 1979; April 4, 1981; September 29, 2013; March 30, 2019	Be Forever Yamato	Theatrical	August 2, 1980
Space Battleship Yamato; Space Battleship Yamato II; Space Battleship Yamato III; Star Blazers: Space Battleship Yamato 2199; Star Blazers: Space Battleship Yamato 2202	Yomiuri TV; JNN (MBS); TXN (TV Tokyo, TV Osaka)	October 6, 1974; October 14, 1978; October 11, 1980; April 7, 2013; October 6, 2018	March 30, 1975; April 4, 1979; April 4, 1981; September 29, 2013; March 30, 2019	Final Yamato	Theatrical	March 19, 1983
Space Battleship Yamato; Space Battleship Yamato II; Space Battleship Yamato III; Star Blazers: Space Battleship Yamato 2199; Star Blazers: Space Battleship Yamato 2202	Yomiuri TV; JNN (MBS); TXN (TV Tokyo, TV Osaka)	October 6, 1974; October 14, 1978; October 11, 1980; April 7, 2013; October 6, 2018	March 30, 1975; April 4, 1979; April 4, 1981; September 29, 2013; March 30, 2019	Space Battleship Yamato: Resurrection	Theatrical	December 12, 2009
Space Battleship Yamato; Space Battleship Yamato II; Space Battleship Yamato III; Star Blazers: Space Battleship Yamato 2199; Star Blazers: Space Battleship Yamato 2202	Yomiuri TV; JNN (MBS); TXN (TV Tokyo, TV Osaka)	October 6, 1974; October 14, 1978; October 11, 1980; April 7, 2013; October 6, 2018	March 30, 1975; April 4, 1979; April 4, 1981; September 29, 2013; March 30, 2019	Space Battleship Yamato (2010)	Theatrical	December 1, 2010
Space Battleship Yamato; Space Battleship Yamato II; Space Battleship Yamato III; Star Blazers: Space Battleship Yamato 2199; Star Blazers: Space Battleship Yamato 2202	Yomiuri TV; JNN (MBS); TXN (TV Tokyo, TV Osaka)	October 6, 1974; October 14, 1978; October 11, 1980; April 7, 2013; October 6, 2018	March 30, 1975; April 4, 1979; April 4, 1981; September 29, 2013; March 30, 2019	Space Battleship Yamato 2199: Odyssey of the Celestial Ark	Theatrical	December 6, 2014
Space Pirate Captain Harlock	TV Asahi	March 14, 1978	February 13, 1979	Space Pirate Captain Harlock: Mystery of the Arcadia	Theatrical	July 22, 1978
Space Pirate Captain Harlock	TV Asahi	March 14, 1978	February 13, 1979	Arcadia of My Youth	Theatrical	July 28, 1982
Space Pirate Captain Harlock	TV Asahi	March 14, 1978	February 13, 1979	Harlock: Space Pirate	Theatrical	September 7, 2013
Space Runaway Ideon	Tokyo Channel 12	May 8, 1980	January 30, 1981	The Ideon: A Contact	Theatrical	July 10, 1982
Space Runaway Ideon	Tokyo Channel 12	May 8, 1980	January 30, 1981	The Ideon: Be Invoked	Theatrical	July 10, 1982
Space Sheriff Gavan	TV Asahi	March 5, 1982	February 25, 1982	Kaizoku Sentai Gokaiger vs. Space Sheriff Gavan: The Movie	Theatrical	January 21, 2012
Space Sheriff Gavan	TV Asahi	March 5, 1982	February 25, 1982	Space Sheriff Gavan: The Movie	Theatrical	October 20, 2012
Space Warrior Baldios	Tokyo Channel 12	June 30, 1980	January 25, 1981	Space Warrior Baldios	Theatrical	December 29, 1981
Spiff and Hercules	TF1	October 9, 1989	December 3, 1994	The Thousand and One Gags of Spiff and Hercules	Theatrical	February 10, 1993
Spirit Riding Free	Netflix	May 5, 2017	December 8, 2020	Spirit Untamed	Theatrical	June 4, 2021
SpongeBob SquarePants	Nickelodeon	May 1, 1999	present	The SpongeBob SquarePants Movie	Theatrical	November 19, 2004
SpongeBob SquarePants	Nickelodeon	May 1, 1999	present	The SpongeBob Movie: Sponge Out of Water	Theatrical	February 6, 2015
SpongeBob SquarePants	Nickelodeon	May 1, 1999	present	The SpongeBob Movie: Sponge on the Run	Theatrical	August 14, 2020
SpongeBob SquarePants	Nickelodeon	May 1, 1999	present	The SpongeBob Movie: Search for SquarePants	Theatrical	December 19, 2025
Star of the Giants	Yomiuri TV	March 30, 1968; October 1, 1977; April 14, 1979	September 18, 1971; September 30, 1978; September 29, 1979	Star of the Giants	Theatrical	August 21, 1982
Star Trek	NBC	September 8, 1966	June 3, 1969	Star Trek: The Motion Picture	Theatrical	December 7, 1979
Star Trek	NBC	September 8, 1966	June 3, 1969	Star Trek II: The Wrath of Khan	Theatrical	June 4, 1982
Star Trek	NBC	September 8, 1966	June 3, 1969	Star Trek III: The Search for Spock	Theatrical	June 1, 1984
Star Trek	NBC	September 8, 1966	June 3, 1969	Star Trek IV: The Voyage Home	Theatrical	November 26, 1986
Star Trek	NBC	September 8, 1966	June 3, 1969	Star Trek V: The Final Frontier	Theatrical	June 9, 1989
Star Trek	NBC	September 8, 1966	June 3, 1969	Star Trek VI: The Undiscovered Country	Theatrical	December 6, 1991
Star Trek	NBC	September 8, 1966	June 3, 1969	Star Trek	Theatrical	May 8, 2009
Star Trek	NBC	September 8, 1966	June 3, 1969	Star Trek Into Darkness	Theatrical	May 16, 2013
Star Trek	NBC	September 8, 1966	June 3, 1969	Star Trek Beyond	Theatrical	July 22, 2016
Star Trek: The Next Generation	Syndication	September 28, 1987	May 23, 1994	Star Trek Generations	Theatrical	November 18, 1994
Star Trek: The Next Generation	Syndication	September 28, 1987	May 23, 1994	Star Trek: First Contact	Theatrical	November 22, 1996
Star Trek: The Next Generation	Syndication	September 28, 1987	May 23, 1994	Star Trek: Insurrection	Theatrical	December 11, 1998
Star Trek: The Next Generation	Syndication	September 28, 1987	May 23, 1994	Star Trek: Nemesis	Theatrical	December 13, 2002
Stargate SG-1	Showtime; Sci Fi	July 27, 1997	March 13, 2007	Stargate: The Ark of Truth	Direct-to-video	March 11, 2008
Stargate SG-1	Showtime; Sci Fi	July 27, 1997	March 13, 2007	Stargate: Continuum	Direct-to-video	July 29, 2008
Starsky & Hutch	ABC	April 30, 1975	May 15, 1979	Starsky & Hutch	Theatrical	March 5, 2004
State of Play	BBC One	May 18, 2003	June 22, 2003	State of Play	Theatrical	April 17, 2009
A Step into the Past	TVB Jade	October 15, 2001	December 7, 2001	Back to the Past	Theatrical	TBD
Steptoe and Son	BBC One	January 4, 1962	December 26, 1974	Steptoe and Son	Theatrical	January 7, 1972
Steptoe and Son	BBC One	January 4, 1962	December 26, 1974	Steptoe and Son Ride Again	Theatrical	July 6, 1973
Steven Universe	Cartoon Network	November 4, 2013	January 21, 2019	Steven Universe: The Movie	Television	September 2, 2019
Strangers with Candy	Comedy Central	April 7, 1999	October 2, 2000	Strangers with Candy	Theatrical	June 28, 2006
The Suite Life of Zack & Cody	Disney Channel	March 18, 2005	September 1, 2008	The Suite Life Movie	Television	March 25, 2011
The Suite Life on Deck	Disney Channel	September 26, 2008	May 6, 2011	The Suite Life Movie	Television	March 25, 2011
Suite PreCure	TV Asahi	February 6, 2011	January 29, 2012	Suite Precure The Movie: Take it back! The Miraculous Melody that Connects Hearts!	Theatrical	October 29, 2011
Super Dimensional Fortress Macross	MBS	October 3, 1982	June 26, 1983	The Super Dimension Fortress Macross: Do You Remember Love?	Theatrical	July 21, 1984
Superman: The Animated Series	Kids' WB	September 6, 1996	February 12, 2000	Superman: Brainiac Attacks	Direct-to-video	June 20, 2006
S.W.A.T.	ABC	February 24, 1975	April 3, 1976	S.W.A.T.	Theatrical	August 8, 2003
The Sweeney	ITV	January 2, 1975	December 28, 1978	Sweeney!	Theatrical	January 20, 1977
The Sweeney	ITV	January 2, 1975	December 28, 1978	Sweeney 2	Theatrical	April 1978
The Sweeney	ITV	January 2, 1975	December 28, 1978	The Sweeney	Theatrical	September 12, 2012
Tales from the Crypt	HBO	June 10, 1989	July 19, 1996	Demon Knight	Theatrical	January 13, 1995
Tales from the Crypt	HBO	June 10, 1989	July 19, 1996	Bordello of Blood	Theatrical	August 16, 1996
Tales from the Crypt	HBO	June 10, 1989	July 19, 1996	Ritual	Theatrical	September 18, 2002
Tama of Third Street: Do You Know My Tama?	MBS; TBS	July 3, 1993	September 25, 1994	Tama of 3rd Street: Please! Search for Momo-chan!!	Theatrical	August 14, 1993
Teacher's Pet	ABC	September 9, 2000	May 10, 2002	Teacher's Pet	Theatrical	January 16, 2004
Teen Titans	Cartoon Network; Kids' WB	July 19, 2003	September 15, 2006	Teen Titans: Trouble in Tokyo	Television	September 15, 2006
Teen Titans Go!	Cartoon Network	April 23, 2013	present	Teen Titans Go! To the Movies	Theatrical	July 27, 2018
Teen Titans Go!	Cartoon Network	April 23, 2013	present	Teen Titans Go! vs. Teen Titans	Direct-to-video	September 24, 2019
Teen Titans Go!	Cartoon Network	April 23, 2013	present	Teen Titans Go! See Space Jam	Television	June 20, 2021
Teen Titans Go!	Cartoon Network	April 23, 2013	present	Teen Titans Go! & DC Super Hero Girls: Mayhem in the Multiverse	Direct-to-video	May 24, 2022
Teenage Mutant Ninja Turtles (1987)	Syndication	December 14, 1987	November 2, 1996	Turtles Forever	Television	July 11, 2009
Teenage Mutant Ninja Turtles (2003)	FoxBox	February 8, 2003	March 27, 2010	Turtles Forever	Television	July 11, 2009
Tetsujin 28-go	Fuji TV	October 20, 1963	May 25, 1966	Tetsujin 28: The Movie	Theatrical	March 19, 2005
T.G.I.S.	GMA Network	August 12, 1995	November 27, 1999	T.G.I.S.: The Movie	Theatrical	January 4, 1997
That Girl	ABC	September 8, 1966	March 19, 1971	That Girl in Wonderland	Television	January 13, 1973
The Thick of It	BBC Four	May 19, 2005	October 27, 2012	In the Loop	Theatrical	April 17, 2009
Thomas & Friends	ITV; Nick Jr. (UK); Channel 5 (UK)	October 9, 1984	January 20, 2021	Thomas and the Magic Railroad	Theatrical	July 14, 2000
Thomas & Friends	ITV; Nick Jr. (UK); Channel 5 (UK)	October 9, 1984	January 20, 2021	Calling All Engines!	Direct-to-video	October 3, 2005
Thomas & Friends	ITV; Nick Jr. (UK); Channel 5 (UK)	October 9, 1984	January 20, 2021	The Great Discovery	Direct-to-video	July 5, 2008
Thomas & Friends	ITV; Nick Jr. (UK); Channel 5 (UK)	October 9, 1984	January 20, 2021	Hero of the Rails	Direct-to-video	September 8, 2009
Thomas & Friends	ITV; Nick Jr. (UK); Channel 5 (UK)	October 9, 1984	January 20, 2021	Misty Island Rescue	Direct-to-video	October 11, 2010
Thomas & Friends	ITV; Nick Jr. (UK); Channel 5 (UK)	October 9, 1984	January 20, 2021	Day of the Diesels	Direct-to-video	September 1, 2011
Thomas & Friends	ITV; Nick Jr. (UK); Channel 5 (UK)	October 9, 1984	January 20, 2021	Blue Mountain Mystery	Direct-to-video	September 3, 2012
Thomas & Friends	ITV; Nick Jr. (UK); Channel 5 (UK)	October 9, 1984	January 20, 2021	King of the Railway	Direct-to-video	September 2, 2013
Thomas & Friends	ITV; Nick Jr. (UK); Channel 5 (UK)	October 9, 1984	January 20, 2021	Tale of the Brave	Direct-to-video	2014
Thomas & Friends	ITV; Nick Jr. (UK); Channel 5 (UK)	October 9, 1984	January 20, 2021	The Adventure Begins	Direct-to-video	March 3, 2015
Thomas & Friends	ITV; Nick Jr. (UK); Channel 5 (UK)	October 9, 1984	January 20, 2021	Sodor's Legend of the Lost Treasure	Direct-to-video	July 17, 2015
Thomas & Friends	ITV; Nick Jr. (UK); Channel 5 (UK)	October 9, 1984	January 20, 2021	The Great Race	Direct-to-video	May 21, 2016
Thomas & Friends	ITV; Nick Jr. (UK); Channel 5 (UK)	October 9, 1984	January 20, 2021	Journey Beyond Sodor	Direct-to-video	August 22, 2017
Thomas & Friends	ITV; Nick Jr. (UK); Channel 5 (UK)	October 9, 1984	January 20, 2021	Big World! Big Adventures!	Direct-to-video	July 20, 2018
Thomas & Friends	ITV; Nick Jr. (UK); Channel 5 (UK)	October 9, 1984	January 20, 2021	Thomas & Friends: The Movie	Theatrical	TBD
The Three Musketeers Anime	NHK	October 9, 1987	February 17, 1989	The Three Musketeers Anime: Aramis' Adventure	Theatrical	March 11, 1999
Thunderbirds	ITV (ATV)	September 30, 1965	December 25, 1966	Thunderbirds Are Go	Theatrical	December 12, 1966
Thunderbirds	ITV (ATV)	September 30, 1965	December 25, 1966	Thunderbird 6	Theatrical	July 29, 1968
Thunderbirds	ITV (ATV)	September 30, 1965	December 25, 1966	Thunderbirds	Theatrical	July 20, 2004
ThunderCats	Syndication	September 9, 1985	September 29, 1989	ThunderCats - Ho!	Television	November 16, 1987
Tiger Mask	Yomiuri TV; TV Asahi	October 2, 1969	September 30, 1971	Tiger Mask	Theatrical	November 9, 2013
Tim and Eric Awesome Show, Great Job!	Adult Swim	February 11, 2007; December 5, 2010	May 2, 2010; July 4, 2017	Tim and Eric's Billion Dollar Movie	Theatrical	March 2, 2012
Tiny Toon Adventures	Syndication	September 14, 1990	December 6, 1992	Tiny Toon Adventures: How I Spent My Vacation	Direct-to-video	March 11, 1992
Tokumei Sentai Go-Busters	TV Asahi	February 26, 2012	February 10, 2013	Tokumei Sentai Go-Busters vs. Kaizoku Sentai Gokaiger: The Movie	Theatrical	January 19, 2013
Tokumei Sentai Go-Busters	TV Asahi	February 26, 2012	February 10, 2013	Zyuden Sentai Kyoryuger vs. Go-Busters: The Great Dinosaur Battle! Farewell Our Eternal Friends	Theatrical	January 18, 2014
Toopy and Binoo	Treehouse TV	January 3, 2005	December 29, 2006	Toopy and Binoo: The Movie	Theatrical	August 11, 2023
Top Cat	ABC	September 27, 1961	April 18, 1962	Top Cat: The Movie	Theatrical	September 16, 2011
Top Cat	ABC	September 27, 1961	April 18, 1962	Top Cat Begins	Theatrical	October 30, 2015
Toriko	FNS (Fuji TV)	April 3, 2011	March 30, 2014	Toriko the Movie: Bishokushin's Special Menu	Theatrical	July 27, 2013
Touch	Fuji TV	March 24, 1985	March 22, 1987	Touch	Theatrical	September 10, 2005
Traffik	Channel 4	June 22, 1989	July 24, 1989	Traffic	Theatrical	December 27, 2000
Trailer Park Boys	Showcase; Netflix	April 22, 2001; September 5, 2014	December 7, 2008 present	Trailer Park Boys: The Movie	Theatrical	October 6, 2006
Trailer Park Boys	Showcase; Netflix	April 22, 2001; September 5, 2014	December 7, 2008 present	Trailer Park Boys: Countdown to Liquor Day	Theatrical	September 25, 2009
Trailer Park Boys	Showcase; Netflix	April 22, 2001; September 5, 2014	December 7, 2008 present	Trailer Park Boys: Don't Legalize It	Theatrical	April 18, 2014
The Transformers	Syndication	September 17, 1984	November 11, 1987	The Transformers: The Movie	Theatrical	August 8, 1986
Trollhunters; 3Below; Wizards	Netflix	December 23, 2016; December 21, 2018; August 7, 2020	May 25, 2018; July 12, 2019; August 7, 2020	Trollhunters: Rise of the Titans	Streaming	July 21, 2021
The Twilight Zone	CBS	October 2, 1959	June 19, 1964	Twilight Zone: The Movie	Theatrical	June 24, 1983
The Twilight Zone	CBS	October 2, 1959	June 19, 1964	For All Time	Television	October 18, 2000
Twin Peaks	ABC; Showtime	April 8, 1990; May 21, 2017	June 10, 1991; September 3, 2017	Twin Peaks: Fire Walk with Me	Theatrical	August 28, 1992
Twin Peaks	ABC; Showtime	April 8, 1990; May 21, 2017	June 10, 1991; September 3, 2017	Twin Peaks: The Missing Pieces	Theatrical (limited)	July 16, 2014
Ultra Q	Tokyo Broadcasting System	January 2, 1966	July 3, 1966	Ultra Q The Movie: Legend of the Stars	Theatrical	April 14, 1990
Underdog	NBC (1964–1966); CBS (1966–1967)	October 3, 1964	March 4, 1967	Underdog	Theatrical	August 3, 2007
The United States Steel Hour	ABC; NBC	October 27, 1953	1963	Ransom!	Theatrical	January 24, 1956
The United States Steel Hour	ABC; NBC	October 27, 1953	1963	The Fastest Gun Alive	Theatrical	April 12, 1956
Unsolved Mysteries	NBC; CBS	1987	1997	Victim of Love: The Shannon Mohr Story	Television	November 9, 1993
Unsolved Mysteries	NBC; CBS	1987	1997	Escape from Terror: The Teresa Stamper Story	Television	January 23, 1995
Unsolved Mysteries	NBC; CBS	1987	1997	From the Files of Unsolved Mysteries: Voice from the Grave	Television	March 20, 1996
Unsolved Mysteries	NBC; CBS	1987	1997	From the Files of Unsolved Mysteries: The Sleepwalker Killing	Television	April 28, 1997
Urusei Yatsura	Fuji TV	October 14, 1981	March 19, 1986	Urusei Yatsura: Only You	Theatrical	February 13, 1983
Urusei Yatsura	Fuji TV	October 14, 1981	March 19, 1986	Urusei Yatsura 2: Beautiful Dreamer	Theatrical	February 11, 1984
Urusei Yatsura	Fuji TV	October 14, 1981	March 19, 1986	Urusei Yatsura 3: Remember My Love	Theatrical	January 26, 1985
Urusei Yatsura	Fuji TV	October 14, 1981	March 19, 1986	Urusei Yatsura 4: Lum the Forever	Theatrical	February 22, 1986
Urusei Yatsura	Fuji TV	October 14, 1981	March 19, 1986	Urusei Yatsura: The Final Chapter	Theatrical	February 6, 1988
Urusei Yatsura	Fuji TV	October 14, 1981	March 19, 1986	Urusei Yatsura: Always My Darling	Theatrical	August 18, 1991
VeggieTales	Qubo	December 21, 1993	present	Jonah: A VeggieTales Movie	Theatrical	October 4, 2002
VeggieTales	Qubo	December 21, 1993	present	The Pirates Who Don't Do Anything: A VeggieTales Movie	Theatrical	January 11, 2008
Vietnam War Story	HBO	August 29, 1987	August 21, 1988	Vietnam War Story II	Direct-to-video	1989
The Venture Bros.	Adult Swim	February 16, 2003	October 7, 2018	The Venture Bros.: Radiant Is the Blood of the Baboon Heart	Direct-to-video	July 21, 2023
Veronica Mars	UPN; The CW	September 22, 2004	July 19, 2019	Veronica Mars	Theatrical	March 14, 2014
We Bare Bears	Cartoon Network	July 27, 2015	May 27, 2019	We Bare Bears: The Movie	Television	June 30, 2020
Whatever Happened to the Likely Lads?	BBC1	January 9, 1973	December 24, 1974	The Likely Lads	Theatrical	April 8, 1976
Whoops Apocalypse	ITV	March 14, 1982	April 18, 1982	Whoops Apocalypse	Theatrical	1986
Widows	ITV	March 16, 1983	May 8, 1985	Widows	Theatrical	November 6, 2018
The Wild Thornberrys	Nickelodeon	September 1, 1998	June 11, 2004	The Wild Thornberrys Movie	Theatrical	December 20, 2002
The Wild Thornberrys	Nickelodeon	September 1, 1998	June 11, 2004	Rugrats Go Wild	Theatrical	June 13, 2003
The Wild Wild West	CBS	September 17, 1965	April 11, 1969	Wild Wild West	Theatrical	June 30, 1999
Wizards of Waverly Place	Disney Channel	October 12, 2007	January 6, 2012	Wizards of Waverly Place: The Movie	Television	August 28, 2009
The X-Files	Fox	September 10, 1993; January 24, 2016	May 19, 2002; March 21, 2018	The X-Files	Theatrical	June 19, 1998
The X-Files	Fox	September 10, 1993; January 24, 2016	May 19, 2002; March 21, 2018	The X-Files: I Want to Believe	Theatrical	July 25, 2008
Yes! PreCure 5 GoGo!	TV Asahi	February 3, 2008	January 25, 2009	Yes PreCure 5 GoGo! The Movie: Happy Birthday in the Land of Sweets	Theatrical	November 8, 2008
The Yogi Bear Show	Syndication	January 30, 1961	January 6, 1962	Hey There, It's Yogi Bear!	Theatrical	June 3, 1964
The Yogi Bear Show	Syndication	January 30, 1961	January 6, 1962	Yogi Bear	Theatrical	December 17, 2010
Yo-kai Watch; Yo-kai Watch Shadowside; Yo-kai Watch! Yo-kai Watch Jam - Yo-kai Academy Y: Close Encounters of the N Kind; Yo-kai Watch ♪	TXN; TV Tokyo; TV Osaka; BS Japan; AT-X; Kids Station	January 8, 2014; April 13, 2018; April 5, 2019; December 27, 2019; April 2, 2021	March 30, 2018; March 29, 2019; December 20, 2019; April 9, 2021 present	Yo-kai Watch: The Movie	Theatrical	December 20, 2014
Yo-kai Watch; Yo-kai Watch Shadowside; Yo-kai Watch! Yo-kai Watch Jam - Yo-kai Academy Y: Close Encounters of the N Kind; Yo-kai Watch ♪	TXN; TV Tokyo; TV Osaka; BS Japan; AT-X; Kids Station	January 8, 2014; April 13, 2018; April 5, 2019; December 27, 2019; April 2, 2021	March 30, 2018; March 29, 2019; December 20, 2019; April 9, 2021 present	Yo-kai Watch: Enma Daiō to Itsutsu no Monogatari da Nyan!	Theatrical	December 19, 2015
Yo-kai Watch; Yo-kai Watch Shadowside; Yo-kai Watch! Yo-kai Watch Jam - Yo-kai Academy Y: Close Encounters of the N Kind; Yo-kai Watch ♪	TXN; TV Tokyo; TV Osaka; BS Japan; AT-X; Kids Station	January 8, 2014; April 13, 2018; April 5, 2019; December 27, 2019; April 2, 2021	March 30, 2018; March 29, 2019; December 20, 2019; April 9, 2021 present	Yo-kai Watch: Soratobu Kujira to Double no Sekai no Daibōken da Nyan!	Theatrical	December 17, 2016
Yo-kai Watch; Yo-kai Watch Shadowside; Yo-kai Watch! Yo-kai Watch Jam - Yo-kai Academy Y: Close Encounters of the N Kind; Yo-kai Watch ♪	TXN; TV Tokyo; TV Osaka; BS Japan; AT-X; Kids Station	January 8, 2014; April 13, 2018; April 5, 2019; December 27, 2019; April 2, 2021	March 30, 2018; March 29, 2019; December 20, 2019; April 9, 2021 present	Yo-kai Watch Shadowside: Oni-ō no Fukkatsu	Theatrical	December 16, 2017
Yo-kai Watch; Yo-kai Watch Shadowside; Yo-kai Watch! Yo-kai Watch Jam - Yo-kai Academy Y: Close Encounters of the N Kind; Yo-kai Watch ♪	TXN; TV Tokyo; TV Osaka; BS Japan; AT-X; Kids Station	January 8, 2014; April 13, 2018; April 5, 2019; December 27, 2019; April 2, 2021	March 30, 2018; March 29, 2019; December 20, 2019; April 9, 2021 present	Yo-kai Watch: Forever Friends	Theatrical	December 14, 2018
Yo-kai Watch; Yo-kai Watch Shadowside; Yo-kai Watch! Yo-kai Watch Jam - Yo-kai Academy Y: Close Encounters of the N Kind; Yo-kai Watch ♪	TXN; TV Tokyo; TV Osaka; BS Japan; AT-X; Kids Station	January 8, 2014; April 13, 2018; April 5, 2019; December 27, 2019; April 2, 2021	March 30, 2018; March 29, 2019; December 20, 2019; April 9, 2021 present	Yo-kai Watch Jam the Movie - Yo-Kai Academy Y: Can a Cat be a Hero?	Theatrical	December 13, 2019
You're Under Arrest	TBS (Japan)	November 2, 1996	September 27, 1997	You're Under Arrest: The Movie	Theatrical	April 24, 1999
Yu-Gi-Oh! Duel Monsters	TXN (TV Tokyo)	April 18, 2000	September 29, 2004	Yu-Gi-Oh! The Movie: Pyramid of Light	Theatrical	August 13, 2004
Yu-Gi-Oh! GX	TXN (TV Tokyo)	October 6, 2004	March 26, 2008	Yu-Gi-Oh!: Bonds Beyond Time	Theatrical	January 23, 2010
Yu-Gi-Oh! 5D's	TXN (TV Tokyo)	April 2, 2008	March 30, 2011	Yu-Gi-Oh! The Dark Side of Dimensions	Theatrical	April 23, 2016
Yu Yu Hakusho	Fuji TV	October 10, 1992	December 17, 1994	Yu Yu Hakusho the Movie: Poltergeist Report	Theatrical	April 9, 1994

== Pilot episodes released as feature films ==
Television pilots that were soon or later adapted into feature films for either a release or re-release to movie theaters or direct-to-video.

Series	Title	Release	Notes
77 Sunset Strip	Girl on the Run	October 10, 1958	Pilot initially briefly shown as a "feature film" in one Caribbean theater in order for the studio to cheat Roy Huggins of television series creator rights.
The Adventures of Jimmy Neutron: Boy Genius	Jimmy Neutron: Boy Genius	December 21, 2001	Original unaired pilot, "Runaway Rocketboy" (produced in 1998), expanded and remade into a feature film.
Aladdin	The Return of Jafar	May 20, 1994	The film is a sequel to the 1992 animated film
The Amazing Spider-Man	Spider-Man	September 14, 1977	
The Asphalt Jungle	The Lawbreakers	August 15, 1961	
Battlestar Galactica	"Saga of a Star World"	July 8, 1978 (Canada); May 18, 1979 (United States)	Pilot re-edited into a theatrical release in the UK and international territories, in order to recoup its high production costs, and in the US a year later after the series' original cancellation that same year.
Buck Rogers in the 25th Century	Buck Rogers in the 25th Century	March 30, 1979	Pilot released theatrically as a standalone film when no networks picked it up.
Buzz Lightyear of Star Command	The Adventure Begins	August 8, 2000	
Gargoyles	The Heroes Awaken	January 31, 1995	
Lilo & Stitch: The Series	Stitch! The Movie	August 26, 2003	The film overall was the backdoor pilot to the homonymous series.
Mighty Ducks: The Animated Series	The First Face-Off	April 8, 1997	
The New Addams Family	Addams Family Reunion	September 22, 1998	
Star Wars: The Clone Wars	Star Wars: The Clone Wars	August 15, 2008	
Temple Houston	The Man from Galveston	1963	
The Three Musketeers	Knights of the Queen	1954	
Power Rangers	Turbo: A Power Rangers Movie	March 28, 1997	The film overall takes place between Zeo and Turbo.
Twin Peaks	"Pilot"	April 8, 1990	Pilot released as a film in Europe.
Westinghouse Desilu Playhouse	The Scarface Mob	1959 (UK); 1962 (US)	Pilot of The Untouchables (1959–1963) re-edited into a film for theatrical release.

Many other series have released pilots or edited multi-part episodes as films overseas, including The Greatest American Hero and The X-Files.

=== Failed pilots ===
Some feature films began as a pilot for a TV series that was not picked up by any networks; most of these many failed pilots have been aired as television films.

- 1994 Baker Street: Sherlock Holmes Returns (TV, 1994)
- The Adventures of Pollyanna (TV, 1982)
- Adventures of the Queen (TV, 1975)
- The Alpha Caper (TV, 1973)
- Annihilator (TV, 1986)
- Atlantis: Milo's Return (direct-to-video, 2003)
- The Archer: Fugitive from the Empire (TV, 1981)
- Band of the Hand (1986)
- Bates Motel (TV, 1987)
- Battles: The Murder That Wouldn't Die (TV, 1980)
- Beyond Witch Mountain (TV, 1982)
- Body Bags (TV, 1993)
- Belle's Magical World (direct-to-video, 1998)
- Call Her Mom (TV, 1972)
- Call to Danger (TV, 1973)
- Captain America (TV, 1979)
- Captain Scarlett (1953)
- Chamber of Horrors (1966)
- The Cherokee Trail (TV, 1981)
- The City (TV, 1977)
- The Clone Master (TV, 1978)
- Code Name: Diamond Head (TV, 1977)
- Conspiracy of Terror (TV, 1975)
- Cover Girls (TV, 1977)
- Cruel Intentions 2 (direct-to-video, 2001)
- Dead on Target (TV, 1976)
- Delta County, U.S.A. (TV, 1977)
- Dr. Strange (TV, 1978)
- Earth II (TV, 1971)
- Earth Star Voyager (TV, 1988)
- Ellery Queen: Don't Look Behind You (TV, 1971)
- Exo-Man (TV, 1977)
- Fear No Evil (TV, 1969)
- Fireball Forward (TV, 1972)
- Fluppy Dogs (TV, 1986)
- The Fuzz Brothers (TV, 1973)
- Generation X (TV, 1996)
- Genesis II (TV, 1973)
- The Georgia Peaches (TV, 1980)
- Goodbye Charlie (TV, 1985)
- The Hanged Man (TV, 1974)
- Hell Ship Mutiny (1957)
- Hellinger's Law (TV, 1981)
- Hollywood Confidential (TV, 1997)
- The Hunted Lady (TV, 1977)
- In Like Flynn (TV, 1985)
- Incident on a Dark Street (TV, 1973)
- International Airport (TV, 1985)
- The Invisible Woman (TV, 1983)
- The Judge and Jake Wyler (TV, 1972)
- Justice League of America (TV, 1997)
- Justin Case (TV, 1988)
- Key West (TV, 1973)
- The Killer Who Wouldn't Die (TV, 1976)
- The Lone Ranger (TV, 2003)
- Longarm (TV, 1988)
- Lum and Abner Abroad (1956)
- Madame Sin (TV, 1972)
- The Man Who Fell to Earth (TV, 1987)
- The Man with the Power (TV, 1977)
- The Mark of Zorro (TV, 1974)
- Men of the Dragon (TV, 1974)
- Mulholland Drive (2001)
- Nick Fury: Agent of S.H.I.E.L.D. (TV, 1998)
- Nightmares (1983)
- Nightside (TV, 1980)
- The Norliss Tapes (TV, 1973)
- The Orphan and the Dude (TV, 1975)
- Partners in Crime (TV, 1973)
- Party Wagon (TV, 2004)
- Planet Earth (TV, 1974)
- Poor Devil (TV, 1973)
- Popeye Doyle (TV, 1986)
- The Questor Tapes (TV, 1974)
- The Raiders (1963)
- The Return of Sherlock Holmes (TV, 1987)
- The Return of the World's Greatest Detective (TV, 1976)
- Ride the High Iron (1956)
- Rooster (TV, 1982)
- Sabu and the Magic Ring (1957)
- The Saint in Manhattan (TV, 1987)
- Savage (TV, 1973)
- Scruples (TV, 1981)
- Search for the Gods (TV, 1975)
- The Secret War of Jackie's Girls (TV, 1980)
- The Sheriff and the Astronaut (TV, 1984)
- Shoot Out at Big Sag (1962)
- Shooter (TV, 1988)
- Sidekicks (TV, 1974)
- Spectre (TV, 1977)
- Star Command (TV, 1996)
- Strange New World (TV, 1975)
- Tales of Robin Hood (1951)
- Tarzan and the Trappers (1958)
- Tex and the Lord of the Deep (1985)
- They Call It Murder (TV, 1971)
- Time Travelers (TV, 1976)
- The Trackers (TV, 1971)
- Travis McGee (TV, 1983)
- True Grit: A Further Adventure (TV, 1978)
- Wolfshead: The Legend of Robin Hood (1973)
- Wonder Woman (TV, 1974)
- Ultraman: The Adventure Begins (1987)
- The Underground Man (TV, 1974)
- The Warlord: Battle for the Galaxy (TV, 1998)
- The Young Country (TV, 1970)
- Yuma (TV, 1971)
- Zenon: Girl of the 21st Century (TV, 1999)

== Television films ==
The following are television films that never saw theatrical release.

=== Pilots ===
Some television films have functioned as pilots or backdoor pilots for a subsequent TV series, but most of them start off as the first regular episode of a series overall.

==== Before main run of show ====
Series	Title	Airdate	Notes
Alfred Hitchcock Presents (1985)	"Pilot"	May 5, 1985	
Alias Smith and Jones	Alias Smith and Jones	January 5, 1971	Aired as part of ABC Movie of the Week.
All Grown Up!	"All Growed Up"	July 21, 2001	The first two episodes of the eighth season of Rugrats.
Babylon 5	The Gathering	February 22, 1993	
Baywatch	"Panic at Malibu Pier"	April 23, 1989	
B. J. and the Bear	"The Foundlings"	October 4, 1978	
Banacek	"Detour to Nowhere"	March 20, 1972	
Barbary Coast	"The Barbary Coast"	May 4, 1975	
Bearcats!	Powderkeg	April 16, 1971	
Big Hawaii	"Danger in Paradise"	May 12, 1977	
The Blue Knight	The Blue Knight	May 9, 1975	
The Brady Kids	The Brady Kids on Mysterious Island	September 9, 1972	Aired as part of The ABC Saturday Superstar Movie.
Cagney & Lacey	Cagney & Lacey	October 8, 1981	
Cannon	Cannon	March 26, 1971	
Charlie's Angels	Charlie's Angels	March 21, 1976	
Chase	Chase	March 24, 1973	
Chicago Story	Chicago Story	March 15, 1981	
Code of Vengeance	Code of Vengeance	June 30, 1985	
Code of Vengeance	Dalton: Code of Vengeance II	May 11, 1986	
Code Red	Code Red	September 20, 1981	
Columbo	"Prescription: Murder"	February 20, 1968	
Columbo	"Ransom for a Dead Man"	March 1, 1971	
The D.A.	"Murder One"	December 6, 1969	
The D.A.	"Conspiracy to Kill"	January 8, 1971	
Dan August	"House on Greenapple Road"	January 11, 1970	
The Delphi Bureau	"The Merchant of Death Assignment"	March 6, 1972	
Diagnosis: Murder	"Diagnosis of Murder"	January 5, 1992	
Diagnosis: Murder	"The House on Sycamore Street"	May 1, 1992	
Diagnosis: Murder	"A Twist of the Knife"	February 13, 1993	
Doc Elliot	"Pilot"	March 5, 1973	
Ellery Queen	"Too Many Suspects"	March 23, 1975	
The Family Holvak	The Greatest Gift	November 4, 1974	
Fantasy Island	Fantasy Island	January 14, 1977	
Fantasy Island	Return to Fantasy Island	January 20, 1978	
Firehouse	Firehouse	January 2, 1973	Aired as part of ABC Movie of the Week.
First of the Summer Wine	First of the Summer Wine	January 3, 1988	
Flamingo Road	Flamingo Road	May 12, 1980	
Gemini Man	"Code Name Minus One"	May 10, 1976	
Get Christie Love!	Get Christie Love!	January 22, 1974	Aired as part of ABC Movie of the Week.
Ghost Story	"The New House"	March 17, 1972	
Gibbsville	"The Turning Point of Jim Malloy"	April 12, 1975	
Gun Shy	"Tales of the Apple Dumpling Gang"	January 16, 1982	Episode 14 of the twenty-eighth season of the Disney anthology television series.
Harry O	"Such Dust as Dreams Are Made On"	March 11, 1973	
Harry O	"Smile Jenny, You're Dead"	February 3, 1974	
Hart to Hart	Hart to Hart	August 25, 1979	
Hawaii Five-O	"Cocoon"	September 20, 1968	
Hawkins	"Death and the Maiden"	March 13, 1973	
Hec Ramsey	"The Century Turns"	October 8, 1972	
Hell Town	Hell Town	March 6, 1985	
Hercules: The Legendary Journeys	Hercules and the Amazon Women	April 25, 1994	All five aired as part of the syndicated series Action Pack.
Hercules: The Legendary Journeys	Hercules and the Lost Kingdom	May 2, 1994	All five aired as part of the syndicated series Action Pack.
Hercules: The Legendary Journeys	Hercules and the Circle of Fire	October 31, 1994	All five aired as part of the syndicated series Action Pack.
Hercules: The Legendary Journeys	Hercules in the Underworld	November 7, 1994	All five aired as part of the syndicated series Action Pack.
Hercules: The Legendary Journeys	Hercules in the Maze of the Minotaur	November 14, 1994	All five aired as part of the syndicated series Action Pack.
Here's Boomer	"A Christmas for Boomer"	December 6, 1979	
How the West Was Won	"The Macahans"	January 19, 1976	
The Immortal	The Immortal	September 30, 1969	Aired as part of ABC Movie of the Week.
The Incredible Hulk	The Incredible Hulk	November 4, 1977	
The Incredible Hulk	The Return of the Incredible Hulk	November 27, 1977	
The Invisible Man	The Invisible Man	May 6, 1975	
Iron Horse	"Scalplock"	April 10, 1966	
Ironside	Ironside	March 28, 1967	
James at 15	James at 15	September 5, 1977	
Jigsaw	"Man on the Move"	March 26, 1972	
Joe Forrester	"The Return of Joe Forrester"	May 6, 1975	Episode 22 of the second season of Police Story.
Kate McShane	Kate McShane	April 11, 1975	
Kaz	Kaz	April 14, 1978	
Kiteretsu Daihyakka	Fujiko Fujio no Kiteretsu Daihyakka	November 2, 1987	Anthology set to six self-contained stories.
Knight Rider (2008)	Knight Rider	February 17, 2008	
Kobo, the Li'l Rascal	Kobo-chan Special: Filled with Autumn!!	September 15, 1990	
Kobo, the Li'l Rascal	Kobo-chan Special: Filled with Dreams!!	September 15, 1991	
Kojak	"The Marcus-Nelson Murders"	March 8, 1973	
Kolchak: The Night Stalker	The Night Stalker	January 18, 1972	Aired as part of ABC Movie of the Week.
Kolchak: The Night Stalker	The Night Strangler	January 16, 1973	Aired as part of ABC Movie of the Week.
Kung Fu	"The Way of the Tiger, The Sign of the Dragon"	February 22, 1972	Aired as part of ABC Movie of the Week.
Lady Blue	"Pilot"	April 15, 1985	
Lassie's Rescue Rangers	Lassie and the Spirit of Thunder Mountain	November 11, 1972	Aired as part of The ABC Saturday Superstar Movie.
The Last Precinct	"Pilot"	January 26, 1986	
The Lion Guard	Return of the Roar	November 22, 2015	
Little House on the Prairie	Little House on the Prairie	March 30, 1974	
Longstreet	Longstreet	February 23, 1971	Aired as part of ABC Movie of the Week.
The Love Boat	The Love Boat	September 17, 1976	
The Love Boat	The Love Boat II	January 21, 1977	
The Love Boat	The New Love Boat	May 5, 1977	
Lucan	Lucan	May 22, 1977	
Lucas Tanner	Lucas Tanner	May 8, 1974	
The MacKenzies of Paradise Cove	"Stickin' Together"	April 14, 1978	
Madigan	"The Manhattan Beat"	September 20, 1972	
The Magician	The Magician	March 17, 1973	
Man from Atlantis	Man from Atlantis	March 4, 1977	
Man from Atlantis	The Death Scouts	May 7, 1977	
Man from Atlantis	Killer Spores	May 17, 1977	
Man from Atlantis	The Disappearances	June 20, 1977	
M.A.N.T.I.S.	M.A.N.T.I.S.	January 24, 1994	
Marcus Welby, M.D.	"A Matter of Humanities"	March 26, 1969	
Matlock	"Diary of a Perfect Murder"	March 3, 1986	
Matt Helm	Matt Helm	May 7, 1975	Aired as part of ABC Movie of the Week.
Matt Lincoln	"Dial Hot Line"	March 8, 1970	
McCloud	"Who Killed Miss U.S.A.?"	February 17, 1970	
Medical Center	"U.M.C."	April 17, 1969	
A Mind to Kill	A Mind to Kill	December 14, 1991	
The Mississippi	The Mississippi	June 14, 1982	
Mickey Spillane's Mike Hammer	Murder Me, Murder You	April 9, 1983	
Mickey Spillane's Mike Hammer	More Than Murder	January 26, 1984	
Movin' On	"In Tandem"	May 8, 1974	
Mobile One	"Mobile Two"	September 2, 1975	
Mulligan's Stew	Mulligan's Stew	June 20, 1977	
The Naked Brothers Band	The Movie	January 27, 2007	
The Name of the Game	Fame Is the Name of the Game	November 26, 1966	
Nakia	Nakia	April 17, 1974	
The New Beachcombers	The New Beachcombers	November 2002	
Night Gallery	Night Gallery	November 8, 1969	
Nightingales	Nightingales	June 27, 1988	
Nurse	Nurse	April 9, 1980	
Oh, Mr. Toad	A Tale of Two Toads	December 29, 1989	
The Oregon Trail	The Oregon Trail	January 10, 1976	
Outlaws	Outlaws	December 28, 1986	
Owen Marshall, Counselor at Law	"A Pattern of Morality"	September 12, 1971	Aired as part of ABC Movie of the Week.
The Paper Chase	The Paper Chase	September 9, 1978	
Paper Dolls	Paper Dolls	May 24, 1982	
Petrocelli	"Night Games"	March 16, 1974	
The Phoenix	The Phoenix	April 26, 1981	
Police Story	"Slow Boy"	March 20, 1973	
Police Woman	"The Gamble"	March 26, 1974	Episode 21 of the first season of Police Story.
The Quest	The Quest	May 13, 1976	
Rapunzel's Tangled Adventure	Tangled: Before Ever After	March 10, 2017	
The Renegades	The Renegades	August 11, 1982	
Richie Brockelman, Private Eye	"The Missing 24 Hours"	October 27, 1976	
Robotech	Codename: Robotech	1985	
The Rockford Files	"Backlash of the Hunter"	March 27, 1974	
The Rookies	The Rookies	March 7, 1972	Aired as part of ABC Movie of the Week.
Rosetti and Ryan	"Men Who Love Women"	May 19, 1977	
The Rousters	"The Marshal of Sladetown"	October 1, 1983	
Sabrina the Teenage Witch	Sabrina the Teenage Witch	April 7, 1996	
Sarge	"The Badge or the Cross"	February 22, 1971	
Search	Probe	February 21, 1972	
Serpico	"The Deadly Game"	April 24, 1976	
Shillingbury Tales	The Shillingbury Blowers	January 6, 1980	
Sidekicks	The Last Electric Knight	February 16, 1986	Episode 3 of the thirtieth season of the Disney anthology television series.
The Six Million Dollar Man	The Six Million Dollar Man	March 7, 1973	All three aired as part of ABC Movie of the Week.
The Six Million Dollar Man	Wine, Women and War	October 20, 1973	All three aired as part of ABC Movie of the Week.
The Six Million Dollar Man	The Solid Gold Kidnapping	November 17, 1973	All three aired as part of ABC Movie of the Week.
The Sixth Sense	Sweet, Sweet Rachel	October 2, 1971	Aired as part of ABC Movie of the Week.
The Snoop Sisters	"The Female Instinct"	December 16, 1972	
Sons and Daughters	"Senior Year"	March 22, 1974	
Spencer's Pilots	Spencer's Pilots	April 9, 1976	
Starsky & Hutch	"Pilot"	April 30, 1975	Aired as part of ABC Movie of the Week.
Stone	"Pilot"	August 26, 1979	
Stingray	Stingray	July 14, 1985	
S.W.A.T.	"S.W.A.T."	February 17, 1975	Episodes 20 & 21 of the third season of The Rookies.
The Swiss Family Robinson	The Swiss Family Robinson	April 15, 1975	Aired as part of ABC Movie of the Week.
Switch	Switch	March 21, 1975	
Sword of Justice	"A Double Life"	September 10, 1978	
Tenafly	"Pilot"	February 12, 1973	
Then Came Bronson	Then Came Bronson	March 24, 1969	
Toma	Toma	March 21, 1973	Aired as part of ABC Movie of the Week.
Transformers: Animated	"Transform and Roll Out"	December 26, 2007	
Vegas	"High Roller"	April 25, 1978	
Viper	"Pilot"	January 2, 1994	
The Waltons	The Homecoming: A Christmas Story	December 19, 1971	
The Wind in the Willows	The Wind in the Willows	December 27, 1983	
Wonder Woman	The New Original Wonder Woman	November 7, 1975	
The Yellow Rose	The Yellow Rose	October 2, 1983	
Yogi's Gang	Yogi's Ark Lark	September 16, 1972	Aired as part of The ABC Saturday Superstar Movie.
The Young Lawyers	The Young Lawyers	October 28, 1969	Aired as part of ABC Movie of the Week.
Young Maverick	The New Maverick	September 3, 1978	
The Young Pioneers	Young Pioneers	March 1, 1976	
The Young Pioneers	Young Pioneers' Christmas	December 1976	

==== First episode proper ====
Series	Title	Airdate	Notes
21 Jump Street	"Pilot"	April 12, 1987	
Aaron's Way	"The Harvest"	March 9, 1988	
Airwolf	"Shadow of the Hawke"	January 22, 1984	
The A-Team	"Mexican Slayride"	January 23, 1983	
Automan	Automan	December 15, 1983	
Baa Baa Black Sheep	"Flying Misfits"	September 21, 1976	
Berrenger's	"Overture"	January 5, 1985	
Blacke's Magic	"Breathing Room"	January 5, 1986	
Brand New Life	"The Honeymooners"	September 18, 1989	
Call to Glory	"Pilot"	August 13, 1984	
Capital News	"Pilot"	April 9, 1990	
China Beach	China Beach	April 26, 1988	
Crime Story	"Pilot"	September 18, 1986	
Dark Skies	"The Awakening"	September 21, 1996	
Darkwing Duck	"Darkly Dawns the Duck"	September 6, 1991	
Dog and Cat	"Pilot"	March 5, 1977	
DuckTales	"The Treasure of the Golden Suns"	September 18, 1987	
Dynasty	"Oil"	January 12, 1981	
Earth 2	"First Contact"	November 6, 1994	
The Eddie Capra Mysteries	"Nightmare at Pendragon Castle"	September 8, 1978	
Emergency!	"The Wedsworth-Townsend Act"	January 15, 1972	
Equal Justice	"Pilot"	March 27, 1990	
The Fall Guy	"Pilot"	November 4, 1981	
Father Murphy	"Pilot"	November 3, 1981	
Foster's Home for Imaginary Friends	"House of Bloo's"	August 13, 2004	
Glitter	"Pilot"	September 13, 1984	
The Greatest American Hero	The Greatest American Hero	March 18, 1981	
Griff	"Man on the Outside"	June 25, 1975	The pilot actually aired two years after the series' cancellation the same year.
The High Chaparral	The High Chaparral	September 10, 1967	
Highway to Heaven	Highway to Heaven	September 19, 1984	
Hotel	Hotel	September 21, 1983	
Hunter	"Pilot"	September 18, 1984	
JAG	"A New Life"	September 23, 1995	
Justice League	"Secret Origins"	November 17, 2001	
Knight Rider (1982)	"Knight of the Phoenix"	September 26, 1982	
L.A. Law	L.A. Law	September 15, 1986	
Logan's Run	Logan's Run	September 16, 1977	
Lois & Clark: The New Adventures of Superman	"Pilot"	September 12, 1993	
MacGruder and Loud	"Pilot"	January 21, 1985	
Magnum, P.I.	"Don't Eat the Snow in Hawaii"	December 11, 1980	
Manimal	Manimal	September 30, 1983	
Matt Houston	"X-22"	September 26, 1982	
McClain's Law	"Pilot"	November 20, 1981	
McMillan & Wife	"Once Upon a Dead Man"	September 17, 1971	
Miami Vice	"Brother's Keeper"	September 16, 1984	
Mighty Ducks: The Animated Series	"The First Face Off"	September 6, 1996	
Misfits of Science	"Deep Freeze"	October 4, 1985	
Missing Persons	"Pilot"	August 30, 1993	
The Mod Squad	"The Teeth of the Barracuda"	September 24, 1968	
Moonlighting	"Pilot"	March 3, 1985	First aired as part of The ABC Sunday Night Movie.
Murder, She Wrote	"The Murder of Sherlock Holmes"	September 30, 1984	
Night Man	Night Man	September 19, 1997	
Private Eye	"Pilot"	September 13, 1987	
Quantum Leap	"Genesis"	March 26, 1989	
Riptide	Riptide	January 3, 1984	
RoboCop	"The Future of Law Enforcement"	March 14, 1994	
Samurai Jack	Samurai Jack: The Premiere Movie	August 10, 2001	
South Beach	"Diamond in the Rough"	June 6, 1993	
Spenser: For Hire	"Promised Land"	September 20, 1985	
Street Hawk	Street Hawk	January 4, 1985	
The Streets of San Francisco	The Streets of San Francisco	September 16, 1972	
Superman: The Animated Series	"The Last Son of Krypton"	September 6, 1996	
Supertrain	"Express to Terror"	February 7, 1979	
Tales of the Gold Monkey	Tales of the Gold Monkey	September 22, 1982	
TaleSpin	"Plunder & Lightning"	September 7, 1990	
Tenspeed and Brown Shoe	Tenspeed and Brown Shoe	January 27, 1980	
Today's FBI	"The Bureau"	October 25, 1981	
Voyagers!	Voyagers!	October 3, 1982	
The Young Indiana Jones Chronicles	Young Indiana Jones and the Curse of the Jackal	March 4, 1992	

=== Reunion films ===
Many American TV series have had TV films, usually filmed five or more years after the run of the original series, which reunite the cast of the series for a new plot. In some cases, there has been an entire string of such films, including for the detective shows Perry Mason (1957–1966; 30 films from 1985 to 1995), The Rockford Files, (1974–80; eight films from 1994 to 1999), and Hart to Hart (1979–1984; eight films from 1993 to 1996). In at least one case, with the 1988 Get Smart reunion film Get Smart, Again!, the success of the TV film eventually led to a brief 1995 revival of the series.

There have also been many television reunion specials, in which some or all of the original cast is brought together for interviews and clips.

=== Specials ===
Television series that have had standalone episodes as films, from continuations and resolutions of storylines through expanded installments with similar miscellaneous purposes, and specials based on their respective characters and elements for alternative reasons of otherwise.

Series	Title	Airdate	Notes
The Adventures of Jimmy Neutron, Boy Genius	The Jimmy Timmy Power Hour	May 7, 2004	
The Adventures of Jimmy Neutron, Boy Genius	"Win, Lose and Kaboom!"	July 9, 2004	
The Adventures of Jimmy Neutron, Boy Genius	"Attack of the Twonkies"	November 11, 2004	
The Adventures of Jimmy Neutron, Boy Genius	When Nerds Collide	January 16, 2006	
The Adventures of Jimmy Neutron, Boy Genius	The Jerkinators	July 21, 2006	
All Dogs Go to Heaven: The Series	An All Dogs Christmas Carol	November 17, 1998	Released straight to video.
Archie's Weird Mysteries	The Archies in JugMan	November 3, 2002	Fifth installment of the TV film series DIC Movie Toons.
As Told by Ginger	"Season of Caprice"	July 7, 2001	
As Told by Ginger	"Far from Home"	August 9, 2003	
As Told by Ginger	"Butterflies Are Free"	June 13, 2004	
As Told by Ginger	"The Wedding Frame"	November 23, 2004	Released straight to video.
Arthur	"Arthur's Perfect Christmas"	November 23, 2000	
Arthur	"Arthur, It's Only Rock 'n' Roll"	September 1, 2002	
Arthur	"D.W. and the Beastly Birthday"	May 29, 2017	
Arthur	"Arthur and the Haunted Tree House"	October 23, 2017	
Arthur	"The Rhythm and Roots of Arthur"	January 20, 2020	
Arthur	"An Arthur Thanksgiving"	November 16, 2020	
Arthur	"Arthur's First Day"	September 6, 2021	
Avatar: The Last Airbender	"Sozin's Comet"	July 19, 2008	
The Banana Splits Adventure Hour	The Banana Splits in Hocus Pocus Park	November 25, 1972	Aired as part of The ABC Saturday Superstar Movie.
The Beachcombers	A Beachcombers Christmas	2004	
Ben 10	"Ben 10 vs. the Negative 10"	March 9, 2008	
Bewitched	Tabitha and Adam and the Clown Family	December 2, 1972	Aired as part of The ABC Saturday Superstar Movie.
Big Time Rush	Big Time Movie	March 10, 2012	
The Bugs Bunny Show	Bugs Bunny's Easter Special	April 7, 1977	
Camp Lazlo	Where's Lazlo?	February 18, 2007	
Captain Future	Kareinaru Taiyoukei Race	December 31, 1978	
Care Bears	Care Bears Nutcracker Suite	December 10, 1988	
Case Closed	The Disappearance of Conan Edogawa: His History's Worst Two Days	December 26, 2014	
Case Closed	Episode One: The Great Detective Turned Small	December 9, 2016	
CatDog	CatDog and the Great Parent Mystery	November 25, 2000	
ChalkZone	"The Big Blow-Up"	August 6, 2004	
Chip 'n Dale Rescue Rangers	Rescue Rangers to the Rescue	September 11–15, 1989	Five-part storyline.
City Hunter	The Secret Service	January 5, 1996	
City Hunter	Goodbye My Sweetheart	April 25, 1997	
City Hunter	Death of the Vicious Criminal Ryo Saeba	April 23, 1999	
Codename: Kids Next Door	"Operation: I.N.T.E.R.V.I.E.W.S."	January 21, 2008	The special overall was the series finale.
Columbo	Season 10	December 9, 1990 – January 30, 2003	
Death Note	Relight: Visions of a God	August 31, 2007	
Death Note	Relight: L's Successors	August 22, 2008	
Dennis the Menace	Cruise Control	October 27, 2002	Fourth installment of the TV film series DIC Movie Toons.
Dexter's Laboratory	Ego Trip	December 10, 1999	
Digimon	Digital Monster X-Evolution	January 3, 2005	
Dragon Ball GT	A Hero's Legacy	March 26, 1997	
Dragon Ball Z	Bardock – The Father of Goku	October 17, 1990	
Dragon Ball Z	The History of Trunks	February 24, 1993	
Drake & Josh	"Really Big Shrimp"	August 3, 2007	
DuckTales	Catch as Cash Can	November 2–5, 1987	Four-part storyline.
DuckTales	Time Is Money	November 24, 1988	
DuckTales	Super DuckTales	March 26, 1989	
Dynasty	"The Titans"	November 13, 1985	
The Facts of Life	The Facts of Life Goes to Paris	September 25, 1982	
The Facts of Life	The Facts of Life Down Under	February 15, 1987	
The Fairly OddParents	"Abra-Catastrophe!"	July 12, 2003	
The Fairly OddParents	"Channel Chasers"	July 23, 2004	
The Fairly OddParents	"School's Out! The Musical"	June 10, 2005	
The Fairly OddParents	"Fairy Idol"	May 19, 2006	
The Fairly OddParents	"Fairly OddBaby"	February 18, 2008	
The Fairly OddParents	"Wishology"	May 1–3, 2009	Three-part storyline.
Family Ties	Family Ties Vacation	September 23, 1985	
The Famous Jett Jackson	Jett Jackson: The Movie	June 8, 2001	
The File of Young Kindaichi	"The Last Opera House Murders"	November 12, 2007	
The File of Young Kindaichi	"Vampire Legend Murder Case"	November 19, 2007	
Flight 29 Down	The Hotel Tango	August 25, 2007	
The Flintstones	A Flintstone Christmas	December 7, 1977	
The Flintstones	Little Big League	April 6, 1978	
The Flintstones	The Flintstones Meet Rockula and Frankenstone	October 30, 1979	
The Flintstones	I Yabba-Dabba Do!	February 7, 1993	
The Flintstones	Hollyrock-a-Bye Baby	December 5, 1993	
The Flintstones	A Flintstones Christmas Carol	November 21, 1994	
Foster's Home for Imaginary Friends	"Good Wilt Hunting"	November 23, 2006	
Foster's Home for Imaginary Friends	"Destination: Imagination"	November 27, 2008	
Galaxy Express 999	Kimi wa Senshi no You ni Ikirareru ka!!	October 11, 1979	
Galaxy Express 999	Eien no Tabibito Emeraldas	April 3, 1980	
Galaxy Express 999	Kimi wa Haha no You ni Aiseru ka!!	October 2, 1980	
Garfield and Friends	Garfield: His 9 Lives	November 22, 1988	Adaptation of the homoynous 1984 book.
Goof Troop	"Goof Troop Christmas: Have Yourself a Goofy Little Christmas"	November 26, 1992	
The Grim Adventures of Billy & Mandy	Wrath of the Spider Queen	July 6, 2007	
The Grim Adventures of Billy & Mandy	Underfist: Halloween Bash	October 12, 2008	The film was a failed backdoor pilot to a proposed spin-off series.
Groovie Goolies	Daffy Duck and Porky Pig Meet the Groovie Goolies	December 16, 1972	Aired as part of The ABC Saturday Superstar Movie.
Hajime no Ippo	Champion Road	April 18, 2003	
The Huckleberry Hound Show	The Good, the Bad, and Huckleberry Hound	May 15, 1988	Sixth installment of the syndicated TV film series Hanna-Barbera Superstars 10.
iCarly	iGo to Japan	November 8, 2008	
Ikkyū-san	Ōabare no Yancha-hime	August 25, 1980	
I'll Fly Away	Then and Now	October 11, 1993	
The Incredible Hulk	"Married"	September 22, 1978	
Inspector Gadget	Inspector Gadget's Last Case	October 6, 2002	First installment of the TV film series DIC Movie Toons.
Inspector Gadget	Inspector Gadget's Biggest Caper Ever	September 6, 2005	Released straight to video.
Justice League	"Starcrossed"	May 29, 2004	
Kenan & Kel	"Two Heads Are Better Than None"	July 15, 2000	
Kimba the White Lion	Jungle Taitei: Yūki ga Mirai wo Kaeru	September 5, 2009	
Kinnikuman	Kessen! Shichinin no Seigi Choujin vs Uchuu Nobushi	April 7, 1984	
Knight Rider	Knight Rider 2010	February 13, 1994	
Kobo, the Li'l Rascal	Kobo-chan Special: Matsuri ga Ippai!	September 15, 1994	
Kobo, the Li'l Rascal	Kobo-chan Special: Yakusoku no Magic Day	September 15, 1998	
Lilo & Stitch: The Series	Leroy & Stitch	June 23, 2006	The film overall was the series finale.
The Life and Times of Grizzly Adams	The Capture of Grizzly Adams	February 21, 1982	
Little House on the Prairie	Look Back at Yesterday	December 12, 1983	
Little House on the Prairie	The Last Farewell	February 6, 1984	
Little House on the Prairie	Bless All the Dear Children	December 17, 1984	
The Littles	Liberty and the Littles	October 18 – November 1, 1986	Three-part storyline; aired as episodes 96–98 of ABC Weekend Special.
The Lone Ranger	The Lone Ranger Story	February 12, 1955	
Lupin the Third	Lupin III TV Special	April 1, 1989 – present	
Madeline	My Fair Madeline	November 17, 2002	Seventh installment of the TV film series DIC Movie Toons.
Maison Ikkoku	The Final Chapter	February 6, 1988	
Mickey Spillane's Mike Hammer	The Return of Mickey Spillane's Mike Hammer	April 18, 1986	The third film led to The New Mike Hammer.
Mickey Spillane's Mike Hammer	Murder Takes All	May 21, 1989	The fourth film was the final installment of the Stacy Keach television series.
My Gym Partner's a Monkey	"The Big Field Trip"	January 14, 2007	
My Gym Partner's a Monkey	"Animal School Musical"	May 25, 2008	
My Life as a Teenage Robot	"Escape from Cluster Prime"	August 12, 2005	
The Naked Brothers Band	"Battle of the Bands"	October 6, 2007	
The Naked Brothers Band	"Sidekicks"	January 21, 2008	
The Naked Brothers Band	"Polar Bears"	June 6, 2008	
The Naked Brothers Band	"Mystery Girl"	October 18, 2008	
The Naked Brothers Band	"Operation Mojo"	November 22, 2008	
The Naked Brothers Band	"Naked Idol"	March 14, 2009	
The Naked Brothers Band	"The Premiere"	April 11, 2009	
Ned's Declassified School Survival Guide	"Field Trips, Permission Slips, Signs & Weasels"	June 8, 2007	
The New Adventures of Flash Gordon	Flash Gordon: The Greatest Adventure of All	August 21, 1982	Originally conceived and produced as an animated television film, it was later reconfigured into an animated TV series; after the aforementioned cartoon show version ended in 1981, the originally intended feature-length film eventually made it to television in 1982.
Oishinbo	Kyūkyoku Tai Shikō, Chōju Ryōri Taiketsu!!	December 11, 1992	
Oishinbo	Nichibei Kome Sensō	December 3, 1993	
One Piece	One Piece TV Special	December 20, 2000 – August 25, 2018	
Peanuts specials	A Charlie Brown Celebration	May 24, 1982	
Peanuts specials	It's an Adventure, Charlie Brown	May 16, 1983	
Peanuts specials	You're a Good Man, Charlie Brown	November 6, 1985	Adaptation of the homoynous 1967 stage musical.
Peanuts specials	Snoopy! The Musical	January 29, 1988	Adaptation of the homoynous 1975 musical.
Peanuts specials	It's the Girl in the Red Truck, Charlie Brown	September 27, 1988	
Pokémon	Mewtwo Returns	December 30, 2000	Direct sequel to Pokémon: The First Movie (1998).
Pokémon	The Mastermind of Mirage Pokémon	October 13, 2006	
Police Story	"A Cry for Justice"	May 23, 1979	
Police Story	"Confessions of a Lady Cop"	April 28, 1980	
Police Story	"The Freeway Killings"	May 3, 1987	
Popeye the Sailor	Popeye Meets the Man Who Hated Laughter	October 7, 1972	Aired as part of The ABC Saturday Superstar Movie.
Rocket Power	"Race Across New Zealand"	February 16, 2002	
Rocket Power	"Reggie's Big (Beach) Break"	July 19, 2003	
Rocket Power	"Island of the Menehune"	July 16, 2004	
Rocket Power	"The Big Day"	July 30, 2004	
Rugrats	Tales from the Crib: Snow White	September 6, 2005	
Rugrats	Tales from the Crib: Three Jacks and a Beanstalk	September 5, 2006	
Sabrina: The Animated Series	Sabrina: Friends Forever	October 6, 2002	Second installment of the TV film series DIC Movie Toons.
Sabrina the Teenage Witch	Sabrina Goes to Rome	October 4, 1998	
Sabrina the Teenage Witch	Sabrina Down Under	September 26, 1999	
Sally the Witch	Majo ni Natta Yoshiko-chan	January 1, 1990	
Sally the Witch	Haha no Ai wa Towa ni! Aurora no Tani ni Kodamasuru Kanashimi no Majo no Sakebi!	December 24, 1990	
Scooby-Doo	Scooby Goes Hollywood	December 23, 1979	
Simon & Simon	"Pirate's Key"	January 20, 1983	
The Six Million Dollar Man	"The Bionic Boy"	November 7, 1976	
The Six Million Dollar Man	"The Thunderbird Connection"	November 28, 1976	
The Six Million Dollar Man	"The Lost Island"	January 30, 1978	
Soreike! Anpanman	Minami no Umi o Sukue!	August 26, 1990	Aired as the last animated installment on Nippon TV's 24 Hour TV "Love Saves the Earth" program.
Soreike! Anpanman	Jam Oji-san	February 21, 2000	
Space Battleship Yamato	Yamato: The New Voyage	July 14, 1979	The film overall takes place between the second and third series.
SpongeBob SquarePants	SpongeBob's Atlantis SquarePantis	November 12, 2007	
SpongeBob SquarePants	SpongeBob's Truth or Square	November 6, 2009	
Star vs. the Forces of Evil	"The Battle for Mewni"	July 15, 2017	
Star Wars: Droids	"The Great Heep"	June 7, 1986	
Stitch!	Stitch and the Planet of Sand	June 16, 2012	
Stitch!	Perfect Memory	August 7, 2015	
Strange Days at Blake Holsey High	"Conclusions"	January 28, 2006	
The Suite Life of Zack & Cody	"The Suite Life Goes Hollywood"	April 20, 2007	
The Sullivans	The John Sullivan Story	August 5, 1979	
Superman: The Animated Series	The Batman Superman Movie: World's Finest	October 4, 1997	
Teenage Mutant Ninja Turtles (1987)	"Planet of the Turtleoids"	August 31, 1991	
Teenage Mutant Ninja Turtles (2003)	Turtles Forever	November 21, 2009	The film overall was the series finale.
Tenjho Tenge	The Past Chapter	March 30, 2005	
ThunderCats	"Mumm-Ra Lives!"	September 17, 1987	
Top Cat	Top Cat and the Beverly Hills Cats	March 20, 1988	Fifth installment of the syndicated TV film series Hanna-Barbera Superstars 10.
Touch	Miss Lonely Yesterday	December 11, 1998	
Touch	Cross Road	February 9, 2001	
The Twilight Zone	Rod Serling's Lost Classics	May 19, 1994	
Unfabulous	"The Perfect Moment"	October 7, 2006	
Urusei Yatsura	Haru da, Tobidase!	March 31, 1982	
Victorious	iParty with Victorious	June 11, 2011	Crossover with iCarly.
Voltron	Fleet of Doom	September 10, 1986	
The Wild Thornberrys	"The Origin of Donnie"	August 18, 2001	
Wishbone	Wishbone's Dog Days of the West	March 13, 1998	
Wizards of Waverly Place	The Wizards Return: Alex vs. Alex	March 15, 2013	
Wonder Woman	"The Return of Wonder Woman"	September 16, 1977	
Xavier Riddle and the Secret Museum	Xavier Riddle and the Secret Movie: I Am Madam President	March 16, 2020	
Yawara! A Fashionable Judo Girl!	Yawara! Special - Zutto Kimi no Koto ga	July 19, 1996	
The Yogi Bear Show	Yogi's First Christmas	November 22, 1980	
The Yogi Bear Show	Yogi's Great Escape	September 20, 1987	First, fourth and tenth installments of the syndicated TV film series Hanna-Barbera Superstars 10.
The Yogi Bear Show	Yogi Bear and the Magical Flight of the Spruce Goose	November 22, 1987	First, fourth and tenth installments of the syndicated TV film series Hanna-Barbera Superstars 10.
The Yogi Bear Show	Yogi and the Invasion of the Space Bears	November 20, 1988	First, fourth and tenth installments of the syndicated TV film series Hanna-Barbera Superstars 10.
The Yogi Bear Show	Yogi the Easter Bear	April 3, 1994	
The Young Indiana Jones Chronicles	Young Indiana Jones and the Mystery of the Blues	March 13, 1993	
The Young Indiana Jones Chronicles	Young Indiana Jones and the Scandal of 1920	April 3, 1993	
The Young Indiana Jones Chronicles	Young Indiana Jones and the Phantom Train of Doom	June 5, 1993	
The Young Indiana Jones Chronicles	Young Indiana Jones and the Hollywood Follies	October 15, 1994	
The Young Indiana Jones Chronicles	Young Indiana Jones and the Treasure of the Peacock's Eye	January 15, 1995	
The Young Indiana Jones Chronicles	Young Indiana Jones and the Attack of the Hawkmen	October 8, 1995	
The Young Indiana Jones Chronicles	Travels with Father	June 16, 1996	

== Programs re-edited for release as feature-length films ==
One or more episodes from the following television programs were edited together for release as a feature film. Some of the films add new material, and others do not.

TV program				Film	
Title	Channel	Premiere	End	Title	Premiere
3000 Leagues in Search of Mother	Fuji TV	January 4, 1976	December 26, 1976	3000 Leagues in Search of Mother	July 19, 1980
The Adventures of Pinocchio	Rai 1 (Italy)	April 8, 1972	May 6, 1972	The Adventures of Pinocchio	December 21, 1972
The Adventures of Rin Tin Tin	ABC	October 15, 1954	May 8, 1959	The Challenge of Rin Tin Tin	1957
The Adventures of Robin Hood	ITV (ATV)	September 25, 1955	March 1, 1959	Robin Hood: The Movie	1991
The Adventures of Robin Hood	ITV (ATV)	September 25, 1955	March 1, 1959	Robin Hood's Greatest Adventures	1991
The Adventures of Robin Hood	ITV (ATV)	September 25, 1955	March 1, 1959	Robin Hood: Quest for the Crown	1991
Adventures of Superman	syndicated	September 19, 1952	April 28, 1958	Superman in Scotland Yard	1954
Adventures of Superman	syndicated	September 19, 1952	April 28, 1958	Superman Flies Again	1954
Adventures of Superman	syndicated	September 19, 1952	April 28, 1958	Superman and the Jungle Devil	1954
Adventures of Superman	syndicated	September 19, 1952	April 28, 1958	Superman in Exile	1954
Adventures of Superman	syndicated	September 19, 1952	April 28, 1958	Superman's Peril	1954
Adventures of Superman	syndicated	September 19, 1952	April 28, 1958	Superman	1973
Alienators: Evolution Continues	Fox Kids (Fox)	September 15, 2001	June 22, 2002	Evolution: The Animated Movie	2002
The Amazing Spider-Man	CBS	September 14, 1977	July 6, 1979	Spider-Man Strikes Back	1978
The Amazing Spider-Man	CBS	September 14, 1977	July 6, 1979	Spider-Man: The Dragon's Challenge	1981
Amazing Stories	NBC	September 29, 1985	April 10, 1987	Amazing Stories: The Movie	April 10, 1987
Amazing Stories	NBC	September 29, 1985	April 10, 1987	Amazing Stories: The Movie II	April 10, 1987
Amazing Stories	NBC	September 29, 1985	April 10, 1987	Amazing Stories: The Movie III	1988
Amazing Stories	NBC	September 29, 1985	April 10, 1987	Amazing Stories: The Movie IV	1988
Amazing Stories	NBC	September 29, 1985	April 10, 1987	Amazing Stories: The Movie V	1989
Amazing Stories	NBC	September 29, 1985	April 10, 1987	Amazing Stories: The Movie VI	1989
Amazing Stories	NBC	September 29, 1985	April 10, 1987	Amazing Stories: The Movie VII	1990
Amazing Stories	NBC	September 29, 1985	April 10, 1987	Amazing Stories VIII	1990
The Asphalt Jungle	ABC	April 2, 1961	June 25, 1961	The Lawbreakers	August 15, 1961
Astro Boy	Fuji TV	January 1, 1963	December 31, 1966	Mighty Atom, the Brave in Space	July 26, 1964
Attack No. 1	Fuji TV	December 7, 1969	November 28, 1971	Attack No. 1: The Movie	March 21, 1970
Attack No. 1	Fuji TV	December 7, 1969	November 28, 1971	Attack No. 1: Revolution	August 1, 1970
Attack No. 1	Fuji TV	December 7, 1969	November 28, 1971	Attack No. 1: World Championship	December 19, 1970
Attack No. 1	Fuji TV	December 7, 1969	November 28, 1971	Attack No. 1: Immortal Bird	March 17, 1971
Banner of the Stars	WOWOW	April 14, 2000	July 14, 2000	Banner of the Stars - Special Edition	July 7, 2001
Barbapapa	WOWOW	October 2, 1974	1977	Le avventure di Barbapapà	1977
The Baron	ITV	September 28, 1966	April 19, 1967	The Man in a Looking Glass	1966
The Baron	ITV	September 28, 1966	April 19, 1967	Mystery Island	1967
Batman Beyond	Kids' WB (The WB)	January 10, 1999	December 18, 2001	Batman Beyond: The Movie	1999
Battlestar Galactica	ABC	September 17, 1978	April 29, 1979	Mission Galactica: The Cylon Attack	1979
The Best Intentions	SVT (Sweden)	1991	1991	The Best Intentions	1992
The Black Corsair		1998	1999	The Black Corsair	1999
Blue Light	ABC	January 12, 1966	May 18, 1966	I Deal in Danger	1966
Bolek and Lolek	Telewizja Polska (Poland); Minimax (Poland)	August 12, 1962	1986	Bolek i Lolek na Dzikim Zachodzie	December 5, 1986
Bolek and Lolek	Telewizja Polska (Poland); Minimax (Poland)	August 12, 1962	1986	Sposób na wakacje Bolka i Lolka	1986
Bolek and Lolek	Telewizja Polska (Poland); Minimax (Poland)	August 12, 1962	1986	Bajki Bolka i Lolka	1986
The Bradys	CBS	February 9, 1990	March 9, 1990	The Brady 500	?
The Bradys	CBS	February 9, 1990	March 9, 1990	The Bradys on the Move	?
The Bradys	CBS	February 9, 1990	March 9, 1990	Big Kids, Big Problems	?
Bruno the Kid	syndicated	September 23, 1996	May 26, 1997	Bruno the Kid: The Animated Movie	1997
Cain's Hundred	NBC	September 19, 1961	May 15, 1962	The Murder Men	1961
Cain's Hundred	NBC	September 19, 1961	May 15, 1962	The Crimebusters	May 19, 1962
Captain Scarlet and the Mysterons	ITV (ATV)	September 29, 1967	May 14, 1968	Captain Scarlet vs. the Mysterons	1980
Captain Scarlet and the Mysterons	ITV (ATV)	September 29, 1967	May 14, 1968	Revenge of the Mysterons from Mars	1981
Care Bears: Welcome to Care-a-Lot	The Hub	June 2, 2012	December 8, 2012	Care Bears: A Belly Badge for Wonderheart - The Movie	2013
The Champions	ITV	September 25, 1968	April 30, 1969	Legend of the Champions	1983
Chessgame	ITV (Granada)	November 23, 1983	December 28, 1983	The Alamut Ambush	1986
Chessgame	ITV (Granada)	November 23, 1983	December 28, 1983	Cold War Killers	1986
Chessgame	ITV (Granada)	November 23, 1983	December 28, 1983	The Deadly Recruits	1986
Clémentine	France 2 (France)	1985	1987	Clementine's Enchanted Journey	1990
Clémentine	France 2 (France)	1985	1987	Clementine: A Young Girl and Her Dreams	1990
Combat Mecha Xabungle	TV Asahi	February 6, 1982	January 29, 1983	Xabungle Graffiti	July 9, 1983
Crest of the Stars	WOWOW	January 2, 1999	March 27, 1999	Crest of the Stars - Special Edition	April 7, 2000
Custer	ABC	September 6, 1967	December 27, 1967	The Legend of Custer	1968
The D.A.	NBC	September 17, 1971	January 7, 1972	Confessions of the D.A. Man	January 20, 1978
Daitetsujin 17	MBS	March 18, 1977	November 11, 1977	Brain 17	1982
Dan August	ABC	September 23, 1970	April 8, 1971	Dan August: Once Is Never Enough	January 1, 1980
Dan August	ABC	September 23, 1970	April 8, 1971	Dan August: The Jealousy Factor	February 4, 1980
Dan August	ABC	September 23, 1970	April 8, 1971	Dan August: The Trouble with Women	June 1, 1980
Dan August	ABC	September 23, 1970	April 8, 1971	Dan August: The Lady Killers	November 10, 1980
Dan August	ABC	September 23, 1970	April 8, 1971	Dan August: Murder, My Friend	November 30, 1980
Danger Man	ITV (ATV)	September 11, 1960	January 12, 1968	Koroshi	1968
Daniel Boone	NBC	September 24, 1964	May 7, 1970	Daniel Boone: Frontier Trail Rider	1966
Davy Crockett	ABC	December 15, 1954	December 14, 1955	Davy Crockett, King of the Wild Frontier	May 25, 1955
Davy Crockett	ABC	December 15, 1954	December 14, 1955	Davy Crockett and the River Pirates	July 18, 1956
Defenders of the Earth	syndicated	September 8, 1986	May 1, 1987	The Story Begins	?
Defenders of the Earth	syndicated	September 8, 1986	May 1, 1987	The Book of Mysteries	?
Defenders of the Earth	syndicated	September 8, 1986	May 1, 1987	Prince Kro-Tan	?
Defenders of the Earth	syndicated	September 8, 1986	May 1, 1987	Necklace of Oros	?
Demetan Croaker, The Boy Frog	Fuji TV	January 2, 1973	September 25, 1973	The Brave Frog	1985
Demetan Croaker, The Boy Frog	Fuji TV	January 2, 1973	September 25, 1973	The Brave Frog's Greatest Adventure	1985
Dennis the Menace	syndicated	September 22, 1986	March 26, 1988	Dennis the Menace: Memory Mayhem	1987
Dennis the Menace	syndicated	September 22, 1986	March 26, 1988	Dennis the Menace: The Mitchell's Move	1987
Dennis the Menace	syndicated	September 22, 1986	March 26, 1988	Dennis the Menace: Dennis the Movie Star	1987
Dinosaur War Izenborg	TV Tokyo	October 17, 1977	June 30, 1978	Attack of the Super Monsters	December 3, 1982
Donkey Kong Country	Teletoon (Canada)	September 4, 1996	July 7, 2000	Donkey Kong Country: The Legend of the Crystal Coconut	1997
Double Dragon	syndicated	September 12, 1993	December 4, 1994	Double Dragon: The Shield of the Shadow Khan	1994
Elves of the Forest	Fuji TV	October 5, 1984	March 29, 1985	A Christmas Adventure	November 1991
Elves of the Forest	Fuji TV	October 5, 1984	March 29, 1985	Christmas Reindeer Tales	1991
Face to Face	SVT2 (Sweden)	1976	1976	Face to Face	1976
The Family Holvak	NBC	September 7, 1975	December 28, 1975	Long Way Home	1975
The Famous Adventures of Mr. Magoo	NBC	September 19, 1964	April 24, 1965	Mr. Magoo in Sherwood Forest	1964
The Famous Adventures of Mr. Magoo	NBC	September 19, 1964	April 24, 1965	Mr. Magoo's Holiday Festival!	1970
Fang of the Sun Dougram	TV Tokyo	October 23, 1981	March 25, 1983	Document: Fang of the Sun Dougram	July 9, 1983
The Flash	CBS	September 20, 1990	May 18, 1991	The Flash	1990
The Flash	CBS	September 20, 1990	May 18, 1991	The Flash II: Revenge of the Trickster	1991
The Flash	CBS	September 20, 1990	May 18, 1991	The Flash III: Deadly Nightshade	1991
Frankenstein's Aunt	ZDF (West Germany)	1987	1987	Freckled Max and the Spooks	1987
Future Boy Conan	NHK General TV	April 4, 1978	October 31, 1978	Future Boy Conan	September 15, 1979
Future Boy Conan	NHK General TV	April 4, 1978	October 31, 1978	Future Boy Conan: The Revival of the Giant Machine	March 11, 1984
Galactic Patrol Lensman	TV Asahi	October 6, 1984	March 30, 1985	Lensman: Power of the Lens	1987
Galactica 1980	ABC	January 27, 1980	May 4, 1980	Conquest of the Earth	1981
Gamba no Bouken	Nippon TV	April 7, 1975	September 29, 1975	Boukenshatachi: Gamba to 7-biki no Naka Ma	1984
Griff	ABC	September 29, 1973	January 4, 1974	The Case of the Baltimore Girls	1973
Griff	ABC	September 29, 1973	January 4, 1974	Death Follows a Psycho	1973
Harold Robbins' The Survivors	ABC	September 22, 1969	September 17, 1970	The Last of the Powerseekers	1971
Heathcliff	syndicated	September 17, 1984	December 26, 1986	The Heathcliff Movie: Heathcliff and Me	1989
Heidi, Girl of the Alps	Fuji TV	January 6, 1974	December 29, 1974	Heidi a scuola	1977
Heidi, Girl of the Alps	Fuji TV	January 6, 1974	December 29, 1974	Heidi in città	1978
Heidi, Girl of the Alps	Fuji TV	January 6, 1974	December 29, 1974	Heidi torna tra i monti	1979
Heidi, Girl of the Alps	Fuji TV	January 6, 1974	December 29, 1974	Heidi in the Mountains	1979
Herbie, the Love Bug	CBS	March 17, 1982	April 14, 1982	Herbie the Matchmaker	1983
Hercules	syndicated (Season 1); ABC (Season 2)	August 31, 1998	March 1, 1999	Hercules: Zero to Hero	1999
He-Man and the Masters of the Universe	syndicated	September 26, 1983	November 21, 1985	Skeletor's Revenge	1986
Highlander: The Series	syndicated	October 3, 1992	May 16, 1998	Highlander: The Gathering	1993
Hondo	ABC	September 8, 1967	December 29, 1967	Hondo and the Apaches	1967
Huckleberry no Bōken	Fuji TV	January 2, 1976	June 25, 1976	Huckleberry Finn	1981
Huckleberry no Bōken	Fuji TV	January 2, 1976	June 25, 1976	Huckleberry no Bōken	August 16, 1991
I Love Lucy	CBS	October 15, 1951	May 6, 1957	I Love Lucy: The Movie	1953
Inhumanoids	syndicated	June 29, 1986	December 14, 1986	Inhumanoids: The Movie	1987
Inspector Gadget	syndicated	September 12, 1983	February 1, 1986	The Inspector Gadget Movie: Go Gadget	1989
Inspector Gadget	syndicated	September 12, 1983	February 1, 1986	Inspector Gadget: Gadget's Greatest Gadgets	2000
Ironside	NBC	September 14, 1967	January 16, 1975	Split Second to an Epitaph	1968
Ironside	NBC	September 14, 1967	January 16, 1975	The Priest Killer	1971
La isla misteriosa y el capitán Nemo	1ère chaîne ORTF (France)	December 17, 1973	December 28, 1973	La isla misteriosa	April 19, 1973
Jem	syndicated	October 6, 1985	May 2, 1988	Jem: The Movie	1987
Jesus: A Kingdom Without Frontiers		1996	1997	The King of Kings: Jesus	1998
Joe 90	ITV (ATV)	September 29, 1968	April 20, 1969	The Amazing Adventures of Joe 90	1981
Journey to the Unknown	ABC	September 26, 1968	January 30, 1969	Journey into Darkness	1969
Journey to the Unknown	ABC	September 26, 1968	January 30, 1969	Journey to the Unknown	June 15, 1970
Journey to the Unknown	ABC	September 26, 1968	January 30, 1969	Journey to Murder	January 30, 1971
Journey to the Unknown	ABC	September 26, 1968	January 30, 1969	Journey to Midnight	October 31, 1971
Jungle Cubs	ABC	October 5, 1996	January 10, 1998	Jungle Cubs: Born to Be Wild	1997
Justice League	Cartoon Network	November 17, 2001	May 29, 2004	Justice League: Starcrossed	July 13, 2004
The Ketchup Vampires	ZDF (West Germany)	October 6, 1992	1994	The Ketchup Vampires	September 26, 1995
The Ketchup Vampires	ZDF (West Germany)	October 6, 1992	1994	The Ketchup Vampires II	September 17, 1996
Kimba the White Lion	Fuji TV	October 6, 1965	September 28, 1966	Jungle Emperor Leo	July 31, 1966
Kolchak: The Night Stalker	ABC	September 13, 1974	March 28, 1975	Crackle of Death	1974
Kolchak: The Night Stalker	ABC	September 13, 1974	March 28, 1975	The Demon and the Mummy	1975
Kraft Suspense Theatre	NBC	October 10, 1963	July 1, 1965	Strategy of Terror	January 1, 1969
Kyōryū Tankentai Born Free	TV Asahi	October 1, 1976	March 25, 1977	Return of the Dinosaurs	July 8, 1984
Laredo	NBC	September 16, 1965	April 7, 1967	Three Guns for Texas	May 1968
Lassie	CBS syndicated	September 12, 1954	March 24, 1973	Lassie's Great Adventure	August 1963
Lassie	CBS syndicated	September 12, 1954	March 24, 1973	Flight of the Cougar	1967
Lassie	CBS syndicated	September 12, 1954	March 24, 1973	The Adventures of Neeka	1968
Lassie	CBS syndicated	September 12, 1954	March 24, 1973	Peace Is Our Profession	1970
Lassie	CBS syndicated	September 12, 1954	March 24, 1973	Well of Love	1970
Lassie	CBS syndicated	September 12, 1954	March 24, 1973	Joyous Sound	February 1973
The Legend of Tarzan	UPN	September 3, 2001	February 5, 2003	Tarzan & Jane	July 23, 2002
The Lieutenant	NBC	September 14, 1963	April 18, 1964	To Kill a Man	1964
The Life and Legend of Wyatt Earp	ABC	September 6, 1955	June 27, 1961	Wyatt Earp: Return to Tombstone	July 1, 1994
Little Lulu and Her Little Friends	NET	October 3, 1976	April 3, 1977	Le incredibili avventure della Piccola Lulù	February 10, 1982
The Lone Ranger	ABC	September 15, 1949	June 6, 1957	The Legend of the Lone Ranger	1952
Lucky Luke	FR3 (France) syndicated (United States)	October 15, 1984	April 8, 1985	The Daltons on the Loose	September 30, 1983
Magical Princess Minky Momo	TV Tokyo	March 18, 1982	May 26, 1983	Minky Momo: The Fairy Princess of Dreamland	2015
Magical Princess Minky Momo	TV Tokyo	March 18, 1982	May 26, 1983	Minky Momo: Love Attack in the Haunted Mansion	2015
Magical Princess Minky Momo	TV Tokyo	March 18, 1982	May 26, 1983	Minky Momo: Android Love	2015
Magne Robo Gakeen	TV Asahi	September 5, 1976	June 26, 1977	Magnos the Robot	1983
The Man from U.N.C.L.E.	NBC	September 22, 1964	January 15, 1968	To Trap a Spy	1964
The Man from U.N.C.L.E.	NBC	September 22, 1964	January 15, 1968	The Spy with My Face	1965
The Man from U.N.C.L.E.	NBC	September 22, 1964	January 15, 1968	One Spy Too Many	1966
The Man from U.N.C.L.E.	NBC	September 22, 1964	January 15, 1968	One of Our Spies Is Missing	1966
The Man from U.N.C.L.E.	NBC	September 22, 1964	January 15, 1968	The Spy in the Green Hat	1966
The Man from U.N.C.L.E.	NBC	September 22, 1964	January 15, 1968	The Karate Killers	1967
The Man from U.N.C.L.E.	NBC	September 22, 1964	January 15, 1968	The Helicopter Spies	1968
The Man from U.N.C.L.E.	NBC	September 22, 1964	January 15, 1968	How to Steal the World	1968
Man in a Suitcase	ITV	September 27, 1967	April 17, 1968	To Chase a Million	1967
The Man Who Never Was	ABC	September 7, 1966	January 4, 1967	The Spy with the Perfect Cover	1967
The Man Who Never Was	ABC	September 7, 1966	January 4, 1967	Danger Has Two Faces	1967
M.A.S.K.	syndicated	September 30, 1985	November 26, 1986	M.A.S.K.: The Movie	1988
M.A.S.K.	syndicated	September 30, 1985	November 26, 1986	M.A.S.K.: The Movie II	1990
The Master	NBC	January 20, 1984	August 31, 1984	The Ninja Master	1984
The Master	NBC	January 20, 1984	August 31, 1984	The Ninja Master II	?
The Master	NBC	January 20, 1984	August 31, 1984	The Return of the Ninja Master	?
The Master	NBC	January 20, 1984	August 31, 1984	Ninja: The Shadows Kill	?
The Master	NBC	January 20, 1984	August 31, 1984	Ninja: Warrior of the Night	?
The Master	NBC	January 20, 1984	August 31, 1984	The Ninja Strikes!	?
The Master	NBC	January 20, 1984	August 31, 1984	The Ninja Man	1985
Message from Space: Galactic Wars	TV Asahi	July 8, 1978	January 27, 1979	Swords of the Space Ark	1983
Mighty Atom	MBS	March 7, 1959	May 28, 1960	?	1962
Mission: Impossible	CBS	September 17, 1966	March 30, 1973	Mission Impossible Versus the Mob	1969
Mobile Suit Gundam	Nagoya TV	April 7, 1979	January 26, 1980	Mobile Suit Gundam	March 14, 1981
Mobile Suit Gundam	Nagoya TV	April 7, 1979	January 26, 1980	Mobile Suit Gundam: Soldiers of Sorrow	July 11, 1981
Mobile Suit Gundam	Nagoya TV	April 7, 1979	January 26, 1980	Mobile Suit Gundam: Encounters in Space	March 13, 1982
Mobile Suit Zeta Gundam	JOLX	March 2, 1985	February 22, 1986	Mobile Suit Zeta Gundam: A New Translation - Heirs to the Stars	May 28, 2005
Mobile Suit Zeta Gundam	JOLX	March 2, 1985	February 22, 1986	Mobile Suit Zeta Gundam: A New Translation II - Lovers	October 29, 2005
Mobile Suit Zeta Gundam	JOLX	March 2, 1985	February 22, 1986	Mobile Suit Zeta Gundam: A New Translation III - Love is the Pulse of the Stars	March 4, 2006
Monica and Friends		December 24, 1976	present	As Aventuras da Turma da Mônica	1983
Monica and Friends		December 24, 1976	present	As Novas Aventuras da Turma da Mônica	1986
Monica and Friends		December 24, 1976	present	Mônica e a Sereia do Rio	1987
Monica and Friends		December 24, 1976	present	O Bicho-Papão	1987
Monica and Friends		December 24, 1976	present	A Estrelinha Mágica	1988
Monica and Friends		December 24, 1976	present	Chico Bento, Óia a Onça!	1990
Monica and Friends		December 24, 1976	present	O Natal de Todos Nós	1992
Monica and Friends		December 24, 1976	present	Quadro a Quadro	1996
Monica and Friends		December 24, 1976	present	O Mônico	1997
Monica and Friends		December 24, 1976	present	O Plano Sangrento	1998
Monica and Friends		December 24, 1976	present	O Estranho Soro do Dr. X	1998
Monica and Friends		December 24, 1976	present	A Ilha Misteriosa	1999
Monica and Friends		December 24, 1976	present	Cine Gibi: O Filme	2004
Monica and Friends		December 24, 1976	present	Cine Gibi 2	2005
Monica and Friends		December 24, 1976	present	Cine Gibi 3: Planos Infalíveis	2008
Mummies Alive!	syndicated	September 15, 1997	November 25, 1997	Mummies Alive! The Legend Begins	April 7, 1998
Neon Genesis Evangelion	TV Tokyo	October 4, 1995	March 27, 1996	Neon Genesis Evangelion: Death & Rebirth	March 15, 1997
The New Adventures of Mighty Mouse and Heckle & Jeckle	CBS	September 8, 1979	April 8, 1980	Mighty Mouse in the Great Space Chase	December 10, 1982
The New Adventures of Winnie the Pooh	ABC	January 17, 1988	October 26, 1991	Seasons of Giving	November 9, 1999
The New Adventures of Winnie the Pooh	ABC	January 17, 1988	October 26, 1991	A Very Merry Pooh Year	November 12, 2002
The New Adventures of Winnie the Pooh	ABC	January 17, 1988	October 26, 1991	Pooh's Heffalump Halloween Movie	September 13, 2005
The Nine Lives of Elfego Baca	ABC	October 3, 1958	March 25, 1960	Elfego Baca: Six Gun Law	1962
Nobody's Boy: Remi	Nippon TV	October 2, 1977	October 1, 1978	Nobody's Boy: Remi	March 15, 1980
Northwest Passage	NBC	September 14, 1958	March 13, 1959	Frontier Rangers	1959
Once Upon a Time... Space	FR3 (France)	October 2, 1982	April 2, 1983	Revenge of the Humanoids	January 26, 1983
Oyayubi Hime Monogatari	TV Tokyo	September 30, 1992	March 31, 1993	Thumbelina: A Magical Story	1993
The Oz Kids	ABC	1996	1997	Toto, Lost in New York	1996
The Oz Kids	ABC	1996	1997	The Nome Prince and the Magic Belt	1996
The Oz Kids	ABC	1996	1997	Underground Adventure	1996
The Oz Kids	ABC	1996	1997	Who Stole Santa?	1996
The Oz Kids	ABC	1996	1997	Christmas in Oz	1996
The Oz Kids	ABC	1996	1997	The Monkey Prince	1996
The Oz Kids	ABC	1996	1997	Journey Beneath the Sea	1996
The Oz Kids	ABC	1996	1997	Virtual Oz	1996
The Oz Kids	ABC	1996	1997	The Return of Mombi	1996
Peppa Pig	5 (United Kingdom); Nick Jr. (UK & Ireland)	May 31, 2004	present	Peppa Pig: My First Cinema Experience	April 7, 2017
Peppa Pig	5 (United Kingdom); Nick Jr. (UK & Ireland)	May 31, 2004	present	Peppa Pig: Peppa Meets the Baby Cinema Experience	May 30, 2025
The Persuaders!	ITV	September 16, 1971	February 25, 1972	Mission: Monte Carlo	1974
The Persuaders!	ITV	September 16, 1971	February 25, 1972	London Conspiracy	1974
The Persuaders!	ITV	September 16, 1971	February 25, 1972	Sporting Chance	1975
The Persuaders!	ITV	September 16, 1971	February 25, 1972	The Switch	1976
Pippi Longstocking	SVT (Sweden)	February 8, 1969	May 3, 1969	Pippi Longstocking	1969
Pippi Longstocking	SVT (Sweden)	February 8, 1969	May 3, 1969	Pippi Goes on Board	1969
Pippi Longstocking	Teletoon (Canada)	October 17, 1997	September 26, 1998	Pippi Longstocking: Pippi's Adventures on the South Seas	1999
Pistols 'n' Petticoats	CBS	September 17, 1966	March 11, 1967	The Far Out West	1967
Planet of the Apes	CBS	September 13, 1974	December 20, 1974	Back to the Planet of the Apes	1981
Planet of the Apes	CBS	September 13, 1974	December 20, 1974	Forgotten City of the Planet of the Apes	1981
Planet of the Apes	CBS	September 13, 1974	December 20, 1974	Treachery and Greed on the Planet of the Apes	1981
Planet of the Apes	CBS	September 13, 1974	December 20, 1974	Life, Liberty and Pursuit on the Planet of the Apes	1981
Planet of the Apes	CBS	September 13, 1974	December 20, 1974	Farewell to the Planet of the Apes	1981
Pocahontas	Italia 1	1997	1998	Pocahontas, Princess of American Indians	1997
Pocahontas	Italia 1	1997	1998	Pocahontas and the Spider Woman	1997
Pocahontas	Italia 1	1997	1998	Pocahontas: Journey in Time	1998
Pocahontas	Italia 1	1997	1998	Pocahontas: Winter on the Rocky Mountain	1998
Il principe del deserto	Canale 5 (Italy)	1991	1991	Beyond Justice	1992
The Prince and the Pauper	NBC	March 11, 1962	March 25, 1962	The Prince and the Pauper	1962
Princess Knight	Fuji TV	April 2, 1967	April 7, 1968	Choppy and the Princess	1972
Puella Magi Madoka Magica	TBS / MBS	January 7, 2011	April 21, 2011	Puella Magi Madoka Magica: The Movie¸ Part 1—Beginnings	October 6, 2012
Puella Magi Madoka Magica	TBS / MBS	January 7, 2011	April 21, 2011	Puella Magi Madoka Magica: The Movie¸ Part 2—Eternal	October 13, 2012
Quatermass	ITV	October 24, 1979	November 14, 1979	The Quatermass Conclusion	1979
Ramar of the Jungle	syndicated	October 7, 1952	1954	White Goddess	1953
Ramar of the Jungle	syndicated	October 7, 1952	1954	Eyes of the Jungle	1953
Ramar of the Jungle	syndicated	October 7, 1952	1954	Thunder Over Sangoland	1955
Ramar of the Jungle	syndicated	October 7, 1952	1954	Phantom of the Jungle	1955
Recess	ABC	September 13, 1997	November 5, 2001	Recess Christmas: Miracle on Third Street	2001
Recess	ABC	September 13, 1997	November 5, 2001	Recess: Taking the Fifth Grade	2003
Recess	ABC	September 13, 1997	November 5, 2001	Recess: All Growed Down	2003
Redwall	Teletoon	September 8, 1999	February 25, 2002	Redwall: The Movie	2000
The Return of Captain Nemo	CBS	March 8, 1978	March 22, 1978	The Amazing Captain Nemo	1978
Return of the Saint	ITV (ATV)	September 10, 1978	March 11, 1979	The Saint and the Brave Goose	1987
Robotix	syndicated	October 6, 1985	January 12, 1986	Robotix: The Movie	1987
Rocky Jones, Space Ranger	syndicated	February 23, 1954	November 16, 1954	The Gypsy Moon	1954
Rocky Jones, Space Ranger	syndicated	February 23, 1954	November 16, 1954	Beyond the Moon	1954
Rocky Jones, Space Ranger	syndicated	February 23, 1954	November 16, 1954	Silver Needle in the Sky	1954
Rocky Jones, Space Ranger	syndicated	February 23, 1954	November 16, 1954	Crash of Moons	1954
Rocky Jones, Space Ranger	syndicated	February 23, 1954	November 16, 1954	Forbidden Moon	1956
Rocky Jones, Space Ranger	syndicated	February 23, 1954	November 16, 1954	Menace from Outer Space	1956
Rocky Jones, Space Ranger	syndicated	February 23, 1954	November 16, 1954	Manhunt in Space	1956
Rocky Jones, Space Ranger	syndicated	February 23, 1954	November 16, 1954	Blast Off	1956
Rocky Jones, Space Ranger	syndicated	February 23, 1954	November 16, 1954	The Cold Sun	1956
Rocky Jones, Space Ranger	syndicated	February 23, 1954	November 16, 1954	The Magnetic Moon	1956
Rocky Jones, Space Ranger	syndicated	February 23, 1954	November 16, 1954	Renegade Satellite	1956
Rocky Jones, Space Ranger	syndicated	February 23, 1954	November 16, 1954	The Robot of Regalio	1956
The Rose of Versailles	Nippon TV	October 10, 1979	September 3, 1980	The Rose of Versailles: I'll Love You As Long As I Live	May 21, 1987
The Saint	ITV (ATV)	October 4, 1962	February 9, 1969	The Fiction-Makers	1968
The Saint	ITV (ATV)	October 4, 1962	February 9, 1969	Vendetta for the Saint	1969
Salem's Lot	CBS	November 17, 1979	November 24, 1979	Salem's Lot	1980
Sandokan	Channel 4 (United Kingdom); RTE Two (Ireland)	1992	1992	The Princess and the Pirate: Sandokan the TV Movie	December 23, 1995
Sara	CBS	February 13, 1976	May 7, 1976	Territorial Men	July 30, 1976
The Scarecrow of Romney Marsh	NBC	February 9, 1964	February 23, 1964	Dr Syn, Alias the Scarecrow	December 1963
Scenes from a Marriage	SVT (Sweden)	April 11, 1973	May 16, 1973	Scenes from a Marriage	September 21, 1974
Science Ninja Team Gatchaman	Fuji TV	October 1, 1972	September 29, 1974	Science Ninja Team Gatchaman: The Movie	May 12, 1978
Serendipity Stories: Friends of Pure Island	Nippon TV	July 1, 1983	December 23, 1983	Serendipity the Pink Dragon	1989
She-Ra: Princess of Power	syndicated	September 9, 1985	December 2, 1986	The Secret of the Sword	March 22, 1985
Sherlock Hound	TV Asahi (Japan); Rai 1 (Italy)	November 6, 1984	May 21, 1985	Meitantei Holmes: Aoi Ruby no Maki / Kaitei no Zaihō no Maki	March 11, 1984
Sherlock Hound	TV Asahi (Japan); Rai 1 (Italy)	November 6, 1984	May 21, 1985	Meitantei Holmes: Mrs. Hudson Hitojichi Jiken / Dover Kaikyō no Daikūchūsen!	August 2, 1986
Shinderera Monogatari	NHK	April 4, 1996	October 3, 1996	Cinderella	?
Shinderera Monogatari	NHK	April 4, 1996	October 3, 1996	Cinderella and the Prince Charles	?
Shinderera Monogatari	NHK	April 4, 1996	October 3, 1996	Cinderella: Conspiracy at the Emerald Castle	?
Simba Jr. Goes to N.Y. and the World Cup	Italia 1	1997	1998	Simba Junior Goes to New York	1998
Simba the King Lion	Italia 1	1996	1997	Simba the King Lion	1996
Simba the King Lion	Italia 1	1996	1997	Simba the King Lion: The Final Battle	1997
Six God Combination Godmars	Nippon TV	October 2, 1981	December 24, 1982	God Mars: The Movie	December 18, 1982
South Park	Comedy Central	August 13, 1997	present	South Park: Imaginationland	March 11, 2008
Space: 1999	ITV	September 4, 1975	November 5, 1977	Destination Moonbase Alpha	1978
Space: 1999	ITV	September 4, 1975	November 5, 1977	Alien Attack	1979
Space: 1999	ITV	September 4, 1975	November 5, 1977	Journey Through the Black Sun	1982
Space: 1999	ITV	September 4, 1975	November 5, 1977	Cosmic Princess	1982
Space Battleship Yamato	Yomiuri TV	October 6, 1974	March 30, 1975	Space Battleship Yamato	August 6, 1977
Space Oz no Bōken	TV Tokyo	October 5, 1992	April 4, 1993	The Wonderful Galaxy of Oz	1996
Speed Racer	Fuji TV	April 2, 1967	March 31, 1968	Speed Racer: The Movie	1993
Star of the Giants	Yomiuri TV	March 30, 1968	September 18, 1971	Star of the Giants: The Bloody Finals	July 26, 1969
Star of the Giants	Yomiuri TV	March 30, 1968	September 18, 1971	Star of the Giants: Go Go Hyūma	December 20, 1969
Star of the Giants	Yomiuri TV	March 30, 1968	September 18, 1971	Star of the Giants: Big League Ball	March 21, 1970
Star of the Giants	Yomiuri TV	March 30, 1968	September 18, 1971	Star of the Giants: The Fateful Showdown	August 1, 1970
Star Wars: Droids	ABC	September 7, 1985	June 7, 1986	The Pirates and the Prince	February 11, 1997
Star Wars: Droids	ABC	September 7, 1985	June 7, 1986	Treasure of the Hidden Planet	November 23, 2004
Star Wars: Ewoks	ABC	September 7, 1985	December 13, 1986	The Haunted Village	February 11, 1997
Star Wars: Ewoks	ABC	September 7, 1985	December 13, 1986	Tales from the Endor Woods	November 23, 2004
Star Wolf	Yomiuri TV	April 2, 1978	September 24, 1978	Fugitive Alien	1986
Star Wolf	Yomiuri TV	April 2, 1978	September 24, 1978	Star Force: Fugitive Alien II	1987
Starcom: The U. S. Space Force	syndicated	September 20, 1987	December 13, 1987	Starcom: The Movie	1989
Steel Jeeg	NET	October 5, 1975	August 29, 1976	La più grande vittoria di Jeeg Robot	November 17, 1979
Stingray	ATV	October 4, 1964	June 27, 1965	The Incredible Voyage of Stingray	1980
Stingray	ATV	October 4, 1964	June 27, 1965	Invaders from the Deep	1981
Street Sharks	syndicated	September 7, 1994	May 18, 1997	Street Sharks: The Gene Slamming Begins	1995
Super Little Fanta Heroes	Italia 1	1997	1998	Pocahontas	1997
Super Little Fanta Heroes	Italia 1	1997	1998	Hua Mulan	1997
Super Little Fanta Heroes	Italia 1	1997	1998	Quasimodo	1997
Super Little Fanta Heroes	Italia 1	1997	1998	King David	1997
Super Little Fanta Heroes	Italia 1	1997	1998	Hercules	1998
Super Little Fanta Heroes	Italia 1	1997	1998	The Thief of Baghdad	1998
Super Little Fanta Heroes	Italia 1	1997	1998	Ulysses	1998
Superman: The Animated Series	Kids' WB (The WB)	September 6, 1996	February 12, 2000	Superman: The Last Son of Krypton	1996
Sylvanian Families	syndicated	September 18, 1987	December 11, 1987	Sylvanian Families: The Movie	1989
Tales of Wells Fargo	NBC	March 18, 1957	June 2, 1962	Gunfight at Black Horse Canyon	1961
Tammy	ABC	September 17, 1965	March 11, 1966	Tammy and the Millionaire	1967
Tarzan	NBC	September 8, 1966	April 5, 1968	Tarzan and the Four O'Clock Army	1968
Tarzan	NBC	September 8, 1966	April 5, 1968	Tarzan's Deadly Silence	1970
Tarzan	NBC	September 8, 1966	April 5, 1968	Tarzan and the Perils of Charity Jones	1971
Texas John Slaughter	ABC	October 13, 1958	April 23, 1961	Texas John Slaughter	1960
Texas John Slaughter	ABC	October 13, 1958	April 23, 1961	A Holster Full of Law	1961
Texas John Slaughter	ABC	October 13, 1958	April 23, 1961	Gundown at Sandoval	1961
Texas John Slaughter	ABC	October 13, 1958	April 23, 1961	Geronimo's Revenge	1962
Texas John Slaughter	ABC	October 13, 1958	April 23, 1961	Stampede at Bitter Creek	1962
Thunderbirds	ITV (ATV)	September 30, 1965	December 25, 1966	Thunderbirds to the Rescue	?
Thunderbirds	ITV (ATV)	September 30, 1965	December 25, 1966	Thunderbirds in Outer Space	?
Thunderbirds	ITV (ATV)	September 30, 1965	December 25, 1966	Countdown to Disaster	?
Tiger Mask	Yomiuri TV; TV Asahi	October 2, 1969	September 30, 1971	Tiger Mask	March 17, 1970
Tiger Mask	Yomiuri TV; TV Asahi	October 2, 1969	September 30, 1971	Tiger Mask: War Against the League of Masked Wrestlers	July 19, 1970
Time Bokan	Fuji TV	October 4, 1975	December 25, 1976	TimeFighters in the Land of Fantasy	1984
Time Bokan	Fuji TV	October 4, 1975	December 25, 1976	TimeFighters	1984
Time Bokan	Fuji TV	October 4, 1975	December 25, 1976	Time Patrol	1985
The Time Tunnel	ABC	September 9, 1966	April 7, 1967	Aliens from Another Planet	1982
The Time Tunnel	ABC	September 9, 1966	April 7, 1967	Revenge of the Gods	1982
The Time Tunnel	ABC	September 9, 1966	April 7, 1967	Old Legends Never Die	1982
The Time Tunnel	ABC	September 9, 1966	April 7, 1967	Kill or Be Killed	1982
The Time Tunnel	ABC	September 9, 1966	April 7, 1967	Raiders from Outer Space	1982
Timon & Pumbaa	syndicated (season 1); CBS (seasons 1–2); Toon Disney (season 3)	September 8, 1995	September 24, 1999	Around the World with Timon & Pumbaa	1996
Tomorrow's Joe	Fuji TV	April 1, 1970	September 29, 1971	Tomorrow's Joe	March 8, 1980
Tomorrow's Joe 2	Nippon TV	October 13, 1980	August 31, 1981	Tomorrow's Joe 2	July 4, 1981
Tōshō Daimos	TV Asahi	April 1, 1978	January 27, 1979	Starbirds	July 1, 1982
Touch	Fuji TV	March 24, 1985	March 22, 1987	Touch: Sebangō no Nai Ace	April 12, 1986
Touch	Fuji TV	March 24, 1985	March 22, 1987	Touch 2: Sayonara no Okurimono	December 13, 1986
Touch	Fuji TV	March 24, 1985	March 22, 1987	Touch 3: Kimi ga Tōri Sugita Ato ni	April 11, 1987
The Travels of Jaimie McPheeters	ABC	September 29, 1963	March 15, 1964	Guns of Diablo	January 29, 1965
Treasure Island	Nippon TV	October 8, 1978	April 1, 1979	Treasure Island	May 9, 1987
The Trials of O'Brien	CBS	September 18, 1965	May 27, 1966	Too Many Thieves	October 13, 1966
The Trip	BBC Two / BBC HD	November 1, 2010	March 31, 2020	The Trip	2010
The Trip	BBC Two / BBC HD	November 1, 2010	March 31, 2020	The Trip to Italy	2014
The Trip	BBC Two / BBC HD	November 1, 2010	March 31, 2020	The Trip to Spain	2017
The Trip	BBC Two / BBC HD	November 1, 2010	March 31, 2020	The Trip to Greece	2020
Triton of the Sea	TV Asahi	April 1, 1972	September 30, 1972	Triton of the Sea	July 14, 1979
Trollz	Syndication	October 3, 2005	November 8, 2005	Trollz: Best Friends for Life - The Movie	2005
Trollz	Syndication	October 3, 2005	November 8, 2005	Trollz: Magic of the Five - The Movie	2005
Trollz	Syndication	October 3, 2005	November 8, 2005	Trollz: Hair Over Heels - The Movie	2007
UFO	ITV	September 16, 1970	March 15, 1973	UFO - Allarme rosso... attacco alla Terra!	1973
UFO	ITV	September 16, 1970	March 15, 1973	UFO - Distruggete Base Luna	1973
UFO	ITV	September 16, 1970	March 15, 1973	UFO - Prendeteli vivi	1974
UFO	ITV	September 16, 1970	March 15, 1973	UFO Contatto Radar… stanno atterrando…!	1974
UFO	ITV	September 16, 1970	March 15, 1973	UFO Annientate SHADO… Uccidete Straker… Stop	1974
UFO	ITV	September 16, 1970	March 15, 1973	Invasion: UFO	1980
UFO Warrior Dai Apolon	TBS (part 1); Tokyo 12 Channel (part 2)	April 6, 1976	February 24, 1977	Shadow World	December 8, 1986
Ultraman	TBS	July 17, 1966	April 9, 1967	Ultraman: Monster Movie Feature	July 22, 1967
The Virginian	NBC	September 19, 1962	March 24, 1971	Backtrack!	May 26, 1969
Voltes V	TV Asahi	June 4, 1977	March 25, 1978	Voltus 5	1983
Voltes V	TV Asahi	June 4, 1977	March 25, 1978	Voltes V: The Liberation	1999
Voltes V: Legacy	GMA Network	May 8, 2023 (planned)	TBA	Voltes V: Legacy - The Cinematic Experience	April 18, 2023
Wakusei Robo Danguard Ace	Fuji TV	March 6, 1977	March 26, 1978	Danguard Ace	2010
Wakusei Robo Danguard Ace	Fuji TV	March 6, 1977	March 26, 1978	Danguard Ace 2	2010
Wakusei Robo Danguard Ace	Fuji TV	March 6, 1977	March 26, 1978	Danguard Ace 3	2010
Willie and the Yank	NBC	January 8, 1967	January 22, 1967	Mosby's Marauders	March 17, 1967
The Wonderful Wizard of Oz	TV Tokyo	October 6, 1986	September 28, 1987	The Wonderful Wizard of Oz	1987
The Wonderful Wizard of Oz	TV Tokyo	October 6, 1986	September 28, 1987	The Marvelous Land of Oz	1987
The Wonderful Wizard of Oz	TV Tokyo	October 6, 1986	September 28, 1987	Ozma of Oz	1987
The Wonderful Wizard of Oz	TV Tokyo	October 6, 1986	September 28, 1987	The Emerald City of Oz	1987
Yakyū-kyō no Uta	Fuji TV	December 23, 1977	March 26, 1979	Yakyū-kyō no Uta: Kita no Ōkami, Minami no Tora	September 15, 1979
The Young Indiana Jones Chronicles	ABC	March 4, 1992	July 24, 1993	My First Adventure	1999
The Young Indiana Jones Chronicles	ABC	March 4, 1992	July 24, 1993	Passion for Life	1999
The Young Indiana Jones Chronicles	ABC	March 4, 1992	July 24, 1993	The Perils of Cupid	1999
The Young Indiana Jones Chronicles	ABC	March 4, 1992	July 24, 1993	Journey of Radiance	1999
The Young Indiana Jones Chronicles	ABC	March 4, 1992	July 24, 1993	Spring Break Adventure	1999
The Young Indiana Jones Chronicles	ABC	March 4, 1992	July 24, 1993	Love's Sweet Song	1999
The Young Indiana Jones Chronicles	ABC	March 4, 1992	July 24, 1993	Trenches of Hell	1999
The Young Indiana Jones Chronicles	ABC	March 4, 1992	July 24, 1993	Demons of Deception	1999
The Young Indiana Jones Chronicles	ABC	March 4, 1992	July 24, 1993	Oganga, the Giver and Taker of Life	1999
The Young Indiana Jones Chronicles	ABC	March 4, 1992	July 24, 1993	Adventures in the Secret Service	1999
The Young Indiana Jones Chronicles	ABC	March 4, 1992	July 24, 1993	Espionage Escapades	1999
The Young Indiana Jones Chronicles	ABC	March 4, 1992	July 24, 1993	Daredevils of the Desert	1999
The Young Indiana Jones Chronicles	ABC	March 4, 1992	July 24, 1993	Tales of Innocence	1999
The Young Indiana Jones Chronicles	ABC	March 4, 1992	July 24, 1993	Masks of Evil	1999
The Young Indiana Jones Chronicles	ABC	March 4, 1992	July 24, 1993	Winds of Change	1999
Zorro	ABC	October 10, 1957	July 2, 1959	The Sign of Zorro	1958
Zorro	ABC	October 10, 1957	July 2, 1959	Zorro the Avenger	1959

== Episodes released theatrically ==
=== Prior to 2000 ===
- Walt Disney anthology television series: Many select television films that aired in the anthology, including Guns in the Heather and The Omega Connection, were adapted for theatrical release in international territories.
- The 20th Century Fox Hour: The season one episode "Overnight Haul" was given a theatrical release in Australia as a standalone film.
- The All-New Pink Panther Show
- Commando Cody: Sky Marshal of the Universe

=== 21st Century ===
- Star Trek: The Next Generation: Six episodes were released in theaters to coincide with the high-definition release of the series on Blu-ray.
- Doctor Who: The 50th anniversary special, The Day of the Doctor (2013), and series 8 opener, Deep Breath (2014), were both shown in theaters alongside their premiere broadcast.
- Game of Thrones: The episodes "The Watchers on the Wall" and "The Children" were given a week-long IMAX release.
- Stranger Things: The series finale, "Chapter Eight: The Rightside Up", was given limited theatrical release in the United States and Canada from the evening of December 31, 2025, through January 1, 2026.
- The Pitt: The season 2 finale, 9:00 P.M., was released 3-days earlier on April 13, 2026 in Alamo Drafthouse cinemas for one-day only.
- The Boys: The series finale, "Blood and Bone", was released on May 19, 2026 in select 4DX theaters across the United States and Canada.

== Films re-edited as episodes for a television program ==
Film		TV program			
Title	Premiere	Title	Channel	Premiere	End
Dragon Ball Z: The Tree of Might	July 7, 1990	Dragon Ball Z (Funimation-Saban dub)	syndicated	September 13, 1996	May 23, 1998
Farewell to Space Battleship Yamato	July 14, 1978	Space Battleship Yamato II	Yomiuri TV	October 14, 1978	April 4, 1979
Futurama: Bender's Big Score	November 27, 2007	Futurama	Fox; Comedy Central	March 28, 1999	September 4, 2013
Futurama: The Beast with a Billion Backs	June 24, 2008	Futurama	Fox; Comedy Central	March 28, 1999	September 4, 2013
Futurama: Bender's Game	November 3, 2008	Futurama	Fox; Comedy Central	March 28, 1999	September 4, 2013
Futurama: Into the Wild Green Yonder	February 24, 2009	Futurama	Fox; Comedy Central	March 28, 1999	September 4, 2013
Girl on the Run	October 10, 1958	77 Sunset Strip	ABC	October 10, 1958	February 7, 1964
The Godfather	March 15, 1972	The Godfather Saga	NBC	November 12, 1977	November 15, 1977
The Godfather Part II	December 20, 1974	The Godfather Saga	NBC	November 12, 1977	November 15, 1977
North Sea Boys	October 12, 1950	The Mickey Mouse Club	ABC	October 3, 1955	September 1959
Superman and the Mole Men	November 23, 1951	Adventures of Superman	syndicated	September 19, 1952	April 28, 1958

== Highest-grossing films based on television series ==
The following is a list of the top 50 highest-grossing films based on television series. Mission Impossible is the most prominent series, with all of its entries being included and occupying spots in the top 11. Bean: The Ultimate Disaster Movie, Boonie Bears: Time Twist, and Boonie Bears: Guardian Code are the only non-American films on the list. 2010 is the most occurring year, with six films total.

Rank	Film	Worldwide gross ($)	Year	Based on original TV series with year	Ref/s
1	Mission: Impossible – Fallout	$791,657,398	2018	Mission: Impossible (1966)	
2	Mission: Impossible – Ghost Protocol	$694,713,380	2011	Mission: Impossible (1966)	
3	Mission: Impossible – Rogue Nation	$682,716,636	2015	Mission: Impossible (1966)	
4	Mission: Impossible – The Final Reckoning	$598,767,057	2025	Mission: Impossible (1966)	
5	Mission: Impossible – Dead Reckoning Part One	$571,125,435	2023	Mission: Impossible (1966)	
6	Mission: Impossible 2	$546,388,108	2000	Mission: Impossible (1966)	
7	The Simpsons Movie	$536,414,270	2007	The Simpsons (1989)	
8	Star Trek Into Darkness	$467,365,246	2013	Star Trek (1966)	
9	Mission: Impossible	$457,696,359	1996	Mission: Impossible (1966)	
10	Sex and the City	$418,769,972	2008	Sex and the City (1998)	
11	Mission: Impossible III	$398,479,497	2006	Mission: Impossible (1966)	
12	Star Trek	$386,839,614	2009	Star Trek (1966)	
13	The Flintstones	$358,500,000	1994	The Flintstones (1960)	
14	The Fugitive	$353,715,317	1993	The Fugitive (1963)	
15	The Mandalorian and Grogu	$345,168,251	2026	The Mandalorian (2019)	
16	Star Trek Beyond	$343,471,816	2016	Star Trek (1966)	
17	22 Jump Street	$331,333,876	2014	21 Jump Street (1987)	
18	The SpongeBob Movie: Sponge Out of Water	$325,186,032	2015	SpongeBob SquarePants (1999)	
19	The Last Airbender	$319,713,881	2010	Avatar: The Last Airbender (2005)	
20	Sex and the City 2	$290,745,055	2010	Sex and the City (1998)	
21	Boonie Bears: Time Twist	$275,866,316	2024	Boonie Bears (2012)	
22	Mr. Peabody & Sherman	$275,698,039	2014	Rocky and Bullwinkle (1959)	
23	Scooby-Doo	$275,678,613	2002	Scooby-Doo (1969)	
24	Charlie's Angels	$264,105,545	2000	Charlie's Angels (1976)	
25	Borat	$262,552,893	2006	Da Ali G Show (2000)	
26	Charlie's Angels: Full Throttle	$259,175,788	2003	Charlie's Angels (1976)	
27	Bean: The Ultimate Disaster Movie	$251,212,670	1997	Mr. Bean (1990)	
28	Dark Shadows	$245,527,149	2012	Dark Shadows (1966)	
29	Mr. Bean's Holiday	$232,225,908	2007	Mr. Bean (1990)	
30	Get Smart	$230,685,453	2008	Get Smart (1965)	
31	Wild Wild West	$222,104,681	1999	The Wild Wild West (1965)	
32	Boonie Bears: Guardian Code	$220,210,000	2023	Boonie Bears (2012)	
33	S.W.A.T.	$207,725,639	2003	S.W.A.T. (1975)	
34	Traffic	$207,515,725	2000	Traffik (1989)	
35	Paw Patrol: The Mighty Movie	$205,098,869	2023	Paw Patrol (2013)	
36	Yogi Bear	$203,509,374	2010	The Huckleberry Hound Show (1958)	
37	21 Jump Street	$201,585,328	2012	21 Jump Street (1987)	
38	Downton Abbey	$194,694,725	2019	Downton Abbey (2010)	
39	The Equalizer	$192,330,738	2014	The Equalizer (1985)	
40	The Naked Gun 2½: The Smell of Fear	$192,240,411	1991	Police Squad (1982)	
41	The X-Files	$189,176,423	1998	The X-Files (1993)	
42	Wayne's World	$183,097,323	1992	Saturday Night Live (1975)	
43	Maverick	$183,031,272	1994	Maverick (1957)	
44	The Fall Guy	$181,260,138	2024	The Fall Guy (1981)	
45	Scooby-Doo 2: Monsters Unleashed	$181,239,132	2004	Scooby-Doo (1969)	
46	Baywatch	$177,856,751	2017	Baywatch (1989)	
47	The A-Team	$177,238,796	2010	The A-Team (1983)	
48	George of the Jungle	$174,463,257	1997	George of the Jungle (1967)	
49	The Muppets	$171,802,998	2011	The Muppet Show (1974)	
50	Jackass 3D	$171,685,792	2010	Jackass (2000)	

== See also ==
- List of films based on radio series
- List of films based on British television series
- List of television programs based on films
