= Commando Cody =

Science fiction film serial character

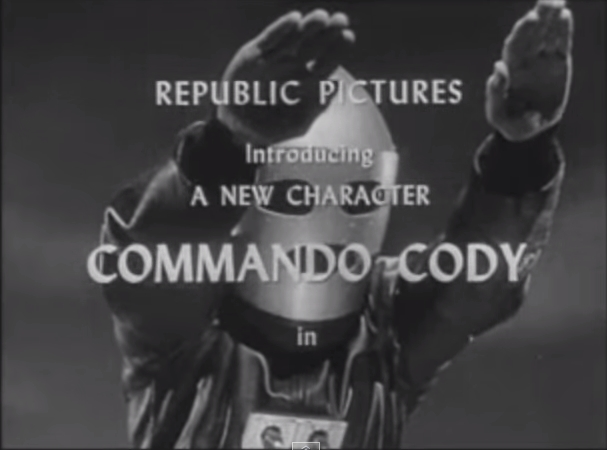
- Commando Cody in Radar Men from the Moon
- Created by: Republic Pictures
- Portrayed by: Judd Holdren; Aline Towne; Gregory Gaye; Craig Kelly; George D. Wallace

In-universe information
- Gender: Male
- Occupation: Commander
- Nationality: American

Commando Cody is the hero in two 12-chapter science fiction serials made by Republic Pictures, played by George Wallace in Radar Men from the Moon (1952) and Judd Holdren in Commando Cody: Sky Marshal of the Universe (1953).

== Zombies of the Stratosphere ==
Another 12-chapter "rocket man" movie serial, Zombies of the Stratosphere, was written as the direct sequel to Radar Men from the Moon. The name of the serial's main character was changed from Commando Cody to the more prosaic Larry Martin when the shooting schedule began. This lead character renaming happened after the footage was shot for the first three episodes of Republic's proposed science fiction syndicated television series, Commando Cody: Sky Marshal of the Universe. This was first released (for contractual reasons) to movie theaters instead of TV. Republic, meanwhile, released both of the "rocket man" serials during 1953. A feature film was made from the King of the Rocket Men serial called Lost Planet Airmen, later inspiring the name of the rock group Commander Cody and His Lost Planet Airmen.

Because of Sky Marshal's original television production origins, the greater length (approximately 25 minutes) of its weekly serial chapters, and their lack of traditional cliffhanger endings, many serial fans refuse to acknowledge the theatrical release of Sky Marshal as a true movie serial. This is despite its having been released weekly to theaters and having a storyline that progresses through a dozen numbered and titled "chapters" until the villain is finally defeated in the 12th. Sky Marshal was finally syndicated to NBC television in 1955 as a dozen 30-minute episodes (including commercials).

== Confusion with other serials ==
Commando Cody serials are sometimes confused with King of the Rocket Men (1949), because the rocket-powered flying suit and helmet costume worn by the title character, Jeff King, was recycled to become the flying suit worn by Cody. To add to the confusion, serial hero Larry Martin, who started out to be Commando Cody, wore the same costume again in Zombies of the Stratosphere.

Referring to these different Republic characters wearing the same costume collectively as "the rocket man" was a retro concept formulated decades later by Dave Stevens' Rocketeer (best known for its 1991 film adaptation), which was in turn a nod to the various Republic "rocket-suited" serial characters.

A similar character with a similar name was Commander Corry, hero of the ABC TV and radio series Space Patrol, which ran from 1950 to 1955. Corry's title was "Commander-in-Chief of the Space Patrol".

== References in other media ==
- The country rock band's name Commander Cody and His Lost Planet Airmen (1967–1976) was inspired by the science fiction serials.
- During the Clone Wars of Star Wars, a clone trooper named Commander Cody serves under Jedi general Obi-Wan Kenobi. This character—complete with rocket backpack—was named after Commando Cody, an homage by Star Wars creator George Lucas to the serials of his youth.
- The Star Trek: Voyager holodeck story The Adventures of Captain Proton features numerous references to Commando Cody and other Republic serials, including the costume worn by the Captain, which was created from replica components of Cody's costume such as his jacket, rocket pack, and chest control panel, and a killer robot that was an almost perfect replica of one used in the original Commando Cody serial.
- Radar Men from the Moon was lampooned in the TV series Mystery Science Theater 3000. The first eight episodes were featured as shorts in several episodes of the first season (only half of the ninth installment was shown, with the in-show excuse being "the film broke").
- Digital/ambient music artists Carbon Based Lifeforms sampled from the first Commando Cody episode in their track "Proton/Electron", using Henderson's lines "It's the same guess that we've made, because it's the only possible answer" and "atomic activity on the moon, atomic blast on the earth."
- The 1988 computer game Rocket Ranger by developer Cinemaware pays direct homage to the "rocket man" serials of the 1950s.
