= The Lost Planet (serial) =

1953 film by Spencer Gordon Bennet

- Poster of chapter 5
- Directed by: Spencer Gordon Bennet (as Spencer Bennet)
- Screenplay by: George H. Plympton; Arthur Hoerl
- Story by: George H. Plympton; Arthur Hoerl
- Produced by: Sam Katzman
- Starring: Judd Holdren
- Cinematography: William P. Whitley (as William Whitney)
- Edited by: Earl Turner
- Color process: Black and white
- Production company: Sam Katzman Productions
- Distributed by: Columbia Pictures
- Release date: June 4, 1953
- Running time: (15 episodes)
- Country: United States
- Language: English

The Lost Planet is a 1953 American science fiction serial film 15-chapter serial which has the distinction of being the last interplanetary-themed sound serial ever made. It was directed by Spencer Gordon Bennet with a screenplay by George H. Plympton and Arthur Hoerl (who also wrote for Rocky Jones, Space Ranger). It appears to have been planned as a sequel to the earlier chapterplay Captain Video: Master of the Stratosphere and shares many plot-points, props and sets, as well as some of the same cast. However, the Video Rangers do not appear, and their uniforms are instead worn by "slaves" created electronically by Reckov, the dictator of the Lost Planet (Gene Roth) with the help of mad scientist Dr. Grood (Michael Fox) and enslaved "good" scientist Professor Dorn (Forrest Taylor).

== Plot ==
Dr. Ernst Grood has succeeded in winning control over the planet Ergro as the first step in his desired conquest of the Universe. Reporter Rex Barrow, his photographer Tim Johnson, Professor Edmund Dorn and his daughter Ella are all captured by Grood, who plans to make use of the professor's knowledge. With the help of the professor's inventions, Rex is able to free Ergro of Grood's domination, while Grood is sent on an endless voyage into space.

== Cast ==
- Judd Holdren as Rex Barrow
- Vivian Mason as Ella Dorn
- Ted Thorpe as Tim Johnson
- Forrest Taylor as Prof. Edmund Dorn
- Michael Fox as Dr. Ernst Grood
- Gene Roth as Reckov
- Karl Davis as Karlo – aka Robot R-4
- Leonard Penn as Ken Wopler
- John Cason as Hopper
- Nick Stuart as Darl
- Joseph Mell as Lah
- Jack George as Jarva
- Frederic Berest as Alden
- I. Stanford Jolley as Robot No. 9
- Pierre Watkin as Ned Hilton

Unlike the Captain Video serial, The Lost Planet has a female character, Professor Dorn's daughter Ella (Vivian Mason) who strides about the Lost Planet (Bronson Canyon) in a female version of the Video Ranger uniform. The hero is not Captain Video, but a newspaper reporter, Rex Barrow, played by Judd Holdren (who had previously played Captain Video and Commando Cody).

== Production ==
The Lost Planet was the last of only three science fiction serials released by Columbia.

This serial was, despite the characters' names, essentially a sequel to Captain Video, from which stock footage was taken for this serial.

It was originally known as The Planet Men.

Michael Fox recalled that writer George Plympton would deliberately write lines that he thought the actors couldn't say such as "The atom propulse set up a radiation wall which cut off the neutron detonator impulse!"

== Critical reception ==
In the opinions of Harmon and Glut, The Lost Planet is a "rather shoddy, low budget space cliffhanger."

== Chapter titles ==
1. Mystery of the Guided Missile
2. Trapped by the Axial Propeller
3. Blasted by the Thermic Disintegrator
4. The Mind Control Machine
5. The Atomic Plane
6. Disaster in the Stratosphere
7. Snared by the Prysmic Catapult
8. Astray in Space
9. The Hypnotic Ray Machine
10. To Free the Planet People
11. Dr. Grood Defies Gravity
12. Trapped in a Cosmo Jet
13. The Invisible Enemy
14. In the Grip of the De-Thermo Ray
15. Sentenced to Space

_{Source:}

== See also ==
- List of film serials
- List of film serials by studio

| Preceded by Son of Geronimo (1952) | Columbia Serial; The Lost Planet (1953) | Succeeded by The Great Adventures of Captain Kidd (1953) |
