= Adventures of Captain Marvel =

1941 serial by William Witney, John English

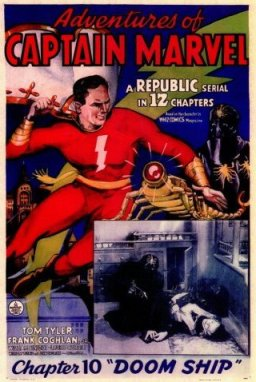
- Theatrical release poster for Chapter 10: "Doom Ship"
- Directed by: William Witney; John English
- Screenplay by: Ronald Davidson; Norman S. Hall; Arch B. Heath; Joseph Poland; Sol Shor
- Based on: Captain Marvel by: Bill Parker; C. C. Beck
- Produced by: Hiram S. Brown, Jr.
- Starring: Tom Tyler; Frank Coghlan Jr. William Benedict; Louise Currie; Robert Strange; Harry Worth; Bryant Washburn; John Davidson
- Cinematography: William Nobles
- Music by: Cy Feuer
- Distributed by: Republic Pictures
- Release date: March 28, 1941
- Running time: 12 chapters / 216 minutes
- Country: United States
- Language: English
- Budget: $135,553 (negative cost: $119,343)

Adventures of Captain Marvel, Chapter 1: Curse of the Scorpion

Adventures of Captain Marvel is a 1941 American 12-chapter black-and-white movie serial from Republic Pictures. The serial was produced by Hiram S. Brown, Jr., directed by John English and William Witney, and stars Tom Tyler as the superhero Captain Marvel and Frank Coghlan, Jr. as his alter ego, Billy Batson. It was adapted from the popular Captain Marvel comic book character, who at the time appeared in the Fawcett Comics publications Whiz Comics and Captain Marvel Adventures. (The character today is owned by DC Comics).

Adventures of Captain Marvel was the twenty-first of 66 film serials produced by Republic and their first comic book character adaptation (not counting comic strips). The serial featured the Fawcett Comics superhero placed within an original screen story and is considered the first theatrical film adaptation of a comic book superhero. In the serial, a young man named Billy Batson is given the power to become the superhuman Captain Marvel in order to fight a criminal mastermind called the Scorpion. The mysterious Scorpion is determined to gain control of an ancient weapon made in the form of a large metallic scorpion whose removable lenses can activate a powerful and destructive ray.

== Plot ==
During an archaeological expedition to find the secret of the Scorpion Kingdom in Siam's volcanic Valley of the Tombs, a device of great power, the Golden Scorpion, is discovered hidden inside a sealed crypt. While examining it, the device's quartz lenses are aligned, and a powerful energy beam is released, causing an explosion that reseals the crypt. This allows young radio broadcaster and expedition member Billy Batson, who obeyed the warning on the crypt's seal not to enter, to be chosen by the ancient wizard Shazam. The wizard grants Billy the powers of Captain Marvel whenever he repeats the wizard's name. Captain Marvel's powers can be used only to protect those in danger from the curse of the Golden Scorpion. After the crypt's entrance is quickly cleared, Captain Marvel utters "Shazam!" and returns to his previous alter ego, Billy Batson.

The Golden Scorpion's lenses are divided among the scientists of the Malcolm Archaeological Expedition so that its power can only be used by an agreement of the entire group. When the scientists return to the U.S., an all-black-garbed-and-hooded criminal mastermind, called the Scorpion, steals the ancient device and sets about stealing the distributed power lenses. Several expedition members are killed in the Scorpion's quest, despite Captain Marvel's frequent efforts to thwart his plan. Deducing that the Scorpion always seems to know what happens during the scientists' meetings, Billy later confides to his friends, Betty Wallace and Whitey Murphy, his suspicion that the Scorpion may be one of the Malcolm archaeological team.

Discovering that one of the Golden Scorpion's power lenses was purposely left behind, cleverly hidden in the very crypt where it was first discovered, Billy Batson and the surviving scientists agree it must be retrieved. They return by cargo ship to Siam, where, near landfall, they barely survive a typhoon before finally being rescued by Captain Marvel. They eventually retrieve the hidden lens, but it is stolen by the Scorpion. By accident, from a distance, the Scorpion observes Captain Marvel transforming back into Billy Batson. Capturing Billy and gagging him, the Scorpion interrogates him about his secret. Billy's tape gag is removed when he agrees to talk. "Shazam"! is his only response, and he transforms in a flash of light and smoke into Captain Marvel. The Scorpion's identity is revealed to be one of the last surviving scientists. He is killed by a Siamese native who aligns the power lenses and turns the device's ray on him, vaporizing him.

Captain Marvel tosses the Golden Scorpion and its lenses into a volcano's molten lava to prevent them from ever being used for evil. Upon its destruction, Captain Marvel is instantly transformed back into Billy Batson forever, the danger from the device's curse having now been eliminated.

=== Chapters ===
1. "Curse of the Scorpion" (30 min.)
2. "The Guillotine" (16 min.)
3. "Time Bomb" (17 min.)
4. "Death Takes the Wheel" (16 min.)
5. "The Scorpion Strikes" (16 min.)
6. "Lens of Death" (16 min.)
7. "Human Targets" (17 min.)
8. "Boomerang" (17 min.)
9. "Dead Man's Trap" (16 min.)
10. "Doom Ship" (16 min.)
11. "Valley of Death" (16 min.)
12. "Captain Marvel's Secret" (16 min.)

_{Source:}

== Cast ==
- Tom Tyler as Captain Marvel
- Frank Coghlan, Jr. as William "Billy" Batson
- William Benedict as Whitey Murphy
- Louise Currie as Betty Wallace
- Robert Strange as John Malcolm
- Harry J. Worth as Prof Luther Bentley
- Bryant Washburn as Harry Carlyle
- John Davidson as Tal Chotali
- George Pembroke as Dr. Stephen Lang
- Peter George Lynn as Prof Dwight Fisher
- Reed Hadley as Rahman Bar
- Jack Mulhall as Howell
- Kenneth Duncan as Barnett
- Nigel De Brulier as Shazam
- Tetsu Komai as Chan Lai
- Stanley Price as Owens
- Gerald Mohr as The Voice of The Scorpion (uncredited)
- Ken Terrell as Bentley's Butler (uncredited)

== Production ==
Adventures of Captain Marvel was budgeted at $135,553, although the final negative cost was $145,588 (a $10,035, or 7.4%, overspend). It was filmed between December 23, 1940, and January 30, 1941, under the working title Captain Marvel. The serial's production number was 1098.

The serial was the outgrowth of Republic's lengthy, failed attempt at licensing Action Comics' (DC Comics today) Superman character. Paramount Pictures successfully tied up all the characters' theatrical exhibition rights for its series of color Superman cartoons, produced for them by Fleischer Studios, which was awarded the license by the publisher. The license that Action Comics provided gave Paramount exclusive use and prevented other film companies from using the Superman character, even in a non-animated production. Undaunted, Republic's completed script was reworked with various changes; it now had an original masked hero, the Copperhead, standing in for Superman, subsequently becoming the Mysterious Doctor Satan serial. The studio then approached Fawcett Comics about filming their most popular superhero, and they agreed. Director William Witney, however, was skeptical about trying to adapt Captain Marvel after the problems encountered with Superman. In spite of this, Adventures of Captain Marvel became the first superhero film adaptation of a comic book character.

National attempted legal action to prevent Republic from developing their arch rival's most successful character, citing Republic's failure at adapting a Superman serial. Their attempt was unsuccessful, however, and Captain Marvel went into production. Writing in his autobiography of the period, William Witney revealed that in his court deposition he had claimed that both Superman and Captain Marvel were derivatives of Popeye. About a decade later, following an ongoing legal battle with National and a declining comics market, Fawcett ceased publication of all its comic book titles. In the 1970s the dormant Captain Marvel family of characters was licensed and revived by DC Comics, which they ultimately wound up purchasing, adding a final chapter to the Fawcett/DC saga.

The opening military scenes in the serial were reused footage lifted from Republic's 1938 film Storm Over Bengal.

=== Casting ===
Republic cast Frank Coghlan as Billy Batson due to his physical resemblance to the character. There was, however, some criticism that Tom Tyler did not sufficiently resemble the "beefy, baby-faced" Captain Marvel. At the time, Tyler was a weightlifting champion and the serial costume matched Captain Marvel's original comic book appearance, right down to his being slender. By the time of the serial's release, the appearance of Captain Marvel had changed due to Fawcett comics artist C. C. Beck changing the way he drew the character.

Tyler was described as clumsy, knocking over props with his "lanky arms". Punches in fight scenes would sometimes connect.

Due to his convincing performance in King of the Royal Mounted, actor Robert Strange (as John Malcolm) was the obvious choice to be the identity of the Scorpion, but by the end of the serial, he was just a diversion and not actually the villain.

=== Special effects ===
An example of Republic's live-action flying effects.

Republic's flying effects, under the direction of Howard and Theodore Lydecker, were performed using a dummy that was slightly larger than life (at 7 feet tall) and made of papier-mache so that it weighed only 15 lbs. The uniform was made of thin silk and cotton jersey. Four pulleys were connected to each shoulder and leg calf, which were then strung on two wires so the dummy moved along them by its own weight. The wires were attached to two opposite objects running across the camera's field of view, and the dummy then slid from one to the other, giving the illusion of flight. This system was originally intended for use in their Superman serial; a prototype dummy was even built but later discarded. The flying pose used for the dummy (arms outstretched and back arched) was based upon a Captain Marvel drawing by comics artist Mac Raboy. If the dummy needed to be seen flying upwards, the cape was convincingly weighted and the dummy was then slid backwards. The film sequence was then optically printed in reverse, completing the flying illusion.

Stuntman David Sharpe was the human part of the effect. Dressed as Captain Marvel, he would leap from a high point with his body straight, as if able to fly, then roll to land at the last second. The combination of flying effects and stunts produced the overall illusion of a flying person. Sharpe also performed other stunts as Captain Marvel, such as back flipping and knocking down attacking Siamese tribesmen in the first chapter. Some shots of Captain Marvel flying were filmed with Tom Tyler posed against rear-projected clouds. Some of these scenes, however, show the suspension wires used to hold him up.

According to author Raymond William Stedman, the flight scenes were the most successful illusion of such aerobatics put upon the screen, in serial or feature.

The technique had been developed in their earlier serial Darkest Africa (1936) and was later used again in their "rocket man" serials (King of the Rocket Men, Radar Men from the Moon, Zombies of the Stratosphere, and Commando Cody: Sky Marshal of the Universe) released from 1949 through 1953.

By contrast, the lower-budget Columbia Pictures Superman serials, which eventually appeared in the late 1940s, used cartoon animation sequences to represent Superman's flying scenes; The effect is considered vastly inferior to those for Republic's live-action sequences in Captain Marvel. Columbia produced the cheapest serials of the era, and producer Sam Katzman was notorious for cutting costs to the bone. The decision came after Superman actor Kirk Alyn was painfully suspended by wires in an attempt to replicate the flying scenes, leading to the team responsible being fired.

=== Costume ===
One of Captain Marvel's tunics later appeared as the costume of a member of the Kryptonian science council in the first episode of The Adventures of Superman television series, filmed in 1951. The lightning bolt on the tunic is partially concealed by means of an oversized collar around the actor's neck.

After the usage in the Superman TV series, two Captain Marvel tunics were worn by actors in early episodes of the pioneering U. S. science fiction TV series Space Patrol. Early into the series, those Marvel tunics were replaced by custom-made shirts.

At the Museum of Pop Culture in Seattle, Washington, one of the remaining Captain Marvel tunics is on public display.

== Release ==
=== Theatrical releases ===
Adventures of Captain Marvel's official release date was March 28, 1941, although this is actually the date the sixth chapter was made available to film exchanges. The serial was re-released on April 15, 1953, under the title Return of Captain Marvel, between the first runs of Jungle Drums of Africa and Canadian Mounties vs. Atomic Invaders. Due to the superhero nostalgia craze in the U. S. during the spring of 1966, resulting from the hit Batman television series, the serial was quickly re-released again, this time as a complete, nearly four-hour-long feature film. All 12 chapters were strung together, each opening with the prior chapter's ending scenes and a plot synopsis, meaning audiences had to sit through a summation of what they had just watched in the previous chapter.

=== Home media ===
Republic Pictures released the serial as a two-tape VHS set in 1995 and then again in 2003 on DVD as a two-disc set. Kino International released the serial on Blu-ray on September 19, 2017; it contains a commentary track provided by film historians Jerry Beck, Chris Eberle, Shane Kelly, Boyd Magers, Leonard Maltin, Adam Murdough, Constantine Nasr, Donnie Waddell, Tom Weaver, and J.D. Witney.

== Critical reception ==
Authors Jim Harmon and Donald F. Glut claim that Adventures of Captain Marvel is one of the finest movie serials ever made, except for the three Flash Gordon serials. Author William C. Cline describes this as one of the most outstanding of all serials and Republic's "masterpiece". He writes that Tyler's "striking" performance remained in the minds of thousands as the most memorable serial hero of all time.

Quentin Tarantino called Tyler's Marvel "the most homicidal berserker superhero" of cinema.

== Influence ==
The characters of Betty Wallace, Whitey Murphy, and John Malcolm all appeared in the Fawcett comics in the 1940s, beginning with "Capt. Marvel and the Temple of Itzalotahui" (Whiz Comics #22, Oct. 3, 1941) featuring Murphy and Malcolm; Murphy made several appearances in the 1970s DC Comics incarnation of Captain Marvel, as featured in the comic series Shazam! and World's Finest Comics.

Fawcett also published a sequel to the 1941 serial. Titled The Return of the Scorpion, it was one of the four releases in its Dime Action Books series, which imitated the format of the popular Big Little Books. The book is notable for reusing several characters from the serial and for being Otto Binder's first writing assignment at Fawcett; he went on to be a prolific comics writer for the company.

In 1994, comic book writer/artist Jerry Ordway wrote and painted a graphic novel, The Power of Shazam!, and an ongoing comic book series spin-off, which ran from 1995 to 1999. Ordway used the Republic serial as his initial inspiration in his handling of the Captain Marvel characters.

Preceded by Mysterious Doctor Satan (1940)	Republic Serial; The Adventures of Captain Marvel (1941)	Succeeded by Jungle Girl (1941)
Preceded by Mysterious Doctor Satan (1940)	Witney-English Serial; The Adventures of Captain Marvel (1941)	Succeeded by Jungle Girl (1941)
