= Douglas Evans (actor) =

American actor (1904–1968)

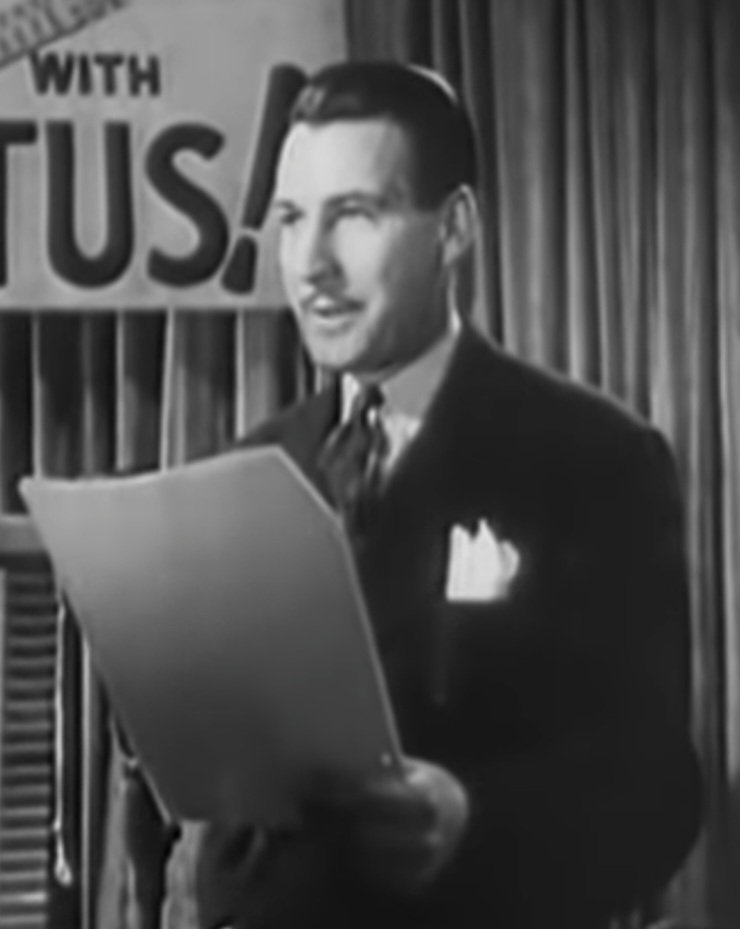
- Evans in The Affairs of Jimmy Valentine (1942)
- Born: January 26, 1904; Madison, Virginia, U.S.
- Died: March 25, 1968 (aged 64); Hollywood, California, U.S.
- Resting place: Hollywood Forever Cemetery
- Occupation: Actor
- Years active: 1937–1968

Douglas Evans (January 26, 1904 – March 25, 1968) was an American actor, known for At War with the Army (1950), King of the Rocket Men (1949), and I Saw What You Did (1965).

== Biography ==
Evans was born in Madison, Virginia. In 1931, he joined the staff of WABC radio in New York as an announcer. Before that, he was an announcer at WMCA, also in New York, and was chief announcer at WGH in Virginia.

He died on March 25, 1968, in Hollywood, California. He is interred in Hollywood Forever Cemetery.

== Selected filmography ==
- Public Cowboy No. 1 (1937) - Radio Announcer (uncredited)
- Young Fugitives (1938) - Announcer (uncredited)
- Dick Tracy Returns (1938) - Mr. Burke (uncredited)
- Hold That Co-ed (1938) - Announcer of State-Louisiana Game (uncredited)
- Society Smugglers (1939) - Radio Announcer (uncredited)
- They Asked for It (1939) - Radio Announcer (uncredited)
- Mr. Smith Goes To Washington (1939) - Francis Scott Key (uncredited)
- Sued for Libel (1939) - Douglas Evans, Radio Announcer (uncredited)
- The Green Hornet (1940, Serial) - Martin Mortinson [Chs. 2-3] (uncredited)
- Three Faces West (1940) - 'We the People' Radio MC (uncredited)
- Oklahoma Renegades (1940) - Show Announcer (uncredited)
- King of the Royal Mounted (1940, Serial) - Sergeant - Wireless Operator [Chs. 1, 11] (uncredited)
- Play Girl (1941) - Concert Radio Announcer (uncredited)
- Man Made Monster (1941) - Police Radio Announcer (uncredited)
- Too Many Blondes (1941) - UBC Radio Network Announcer (uncredited)
- Highway West (1941) - Police Announcer (uncredited)
- Parachute Battalion (1941) - Radio Announcer (voice)
- Sailors on Leave (1941) - Radio Announcer (uncredited)
- Dick Tracy vs Crime Inc (1941, Serial) - Police Broadcaster (uncredited)
- The Affairs of Jimmy Valentine (1942) - Radio Announcer
- Seven Days' Leave (1942) - Radio Announcer (uncredited)
- Hitler's Children (1943) - Radio Announcer (voice, uncredited)
- My Dog Shep (1946) - Dutch Riley
- The Farmer's Daughter (1947) - Silbey, Politician (uncredited)
- Dangerous Venture (1947) - Dr. Atwood
- The Crimson Key (1947) - Dr. Kenneth G. Swann
- Flashing Guns (1947) - Longdon
- Dragnet (1947) - Radio Announcer
- The Spirit of West Point (1947) - Corbett (uncredited)
- Gun Talk (1947) - Rod Jackson
- The Main Street Kid (1948) - Mark Howell
- California Firebrand (1948) - Lance Dawson
- Crossed Trails (1948) - Jim Hudson
- Ruthless (1948) - George (uncredited)
- Secret Service Investigator (1948) - Secret Service Inspector Crehan
- Cowboy Cavalier (1948) - Lance Regan
- Michael O'Halloran (1948) - Dr. Johnson
- The Three Musketeers (1948) - British Officer (uncredited)
- Million Dollar Weekend (1948) - Hotel Desk Clerk (uncredited)
- Hideout (1949) - Radio Announcer
- Trails End (1949) - Mel Porter
- King of the Rocket Men (1949, Serial) - Chairman [Ch. 12]
- Neptune's Daughter (1949) - Radio Contest Announcer (voice, uncredited)
- The Golden Stallion (1949) - Jeff Middleton, Owner of Oro City Hotel
- Powder River Rustlers (1949) - Devereaux, posing as Manning
- D.O.A. (1949) - Eddie - Salesman on Phone (uncredited)
- The Arizona Cowboy (1950) - Rodeo Announcer
- Kill the Umpire (1950) - Doctor (uncredited)
- No Sad Songs for Me (1950) - Jack Miles (uncredited)
- The Invisible Monster (1950, Serial) - James Hunter [Chs. 1, 3, 7, 12] (uncredited)
- Champagne for Caesar (1950) - Radio Announcer (uncredited)
- Lucky Losers (1950) - Tom Whitney
- The Underworld Story (1950) - Newscaster (uncredited)
- Between Midnight and Dawn (1950) - Detective Captain (uncredited)
- Rustlers on Horseback (1950) - Lawyer Ken Jordan
- North of the Great Divide (1950) - Mountie Sergeant
- Counterspy Meets Scotland Yard (1950) - Colonel Kilgore
- At War with the Army (1950) - Col. Davis
- Cuban Fireball (1951) - Atkins (uncredited)
- The Groom Wore Spurs (1951) - Reporter (uncredited)
- I Was a Communist for the FBI (1951) - Chief Agent (uncredited)
- Hollywood Story (1951) - Director (uncredited)
- Queen for a Day (1951) - Freddy Forster
- Let's Go Navy! (1951) - Lt. Smith (Personnel Dept.)
- Little Egypt (1951) - Board Member (uncredited)
- Force of Arms (1951) - Colonel Traill (uncredited)
- The Well (1951) - Lobel
- Leave It to the Marines (1951) - Gen. Garvin
- The Whip Hand (1951) - Carstairs (uncredited)
- Sky High (1951) - Maj. Talbot
- Retreat, Hell! (1952) - Big Boy (uncredited)
- With a Song in My Heart (1952) - Colonel (uncredited)
- My Son John (1952) - Government Employee (uncredited)
- Red Ball Express (1952) - Brigadier General at Briefing (uncredited)
- Actor's and Sin (1952) - Mr. Devlin (segment "Woman of Sin")
- The Quiet Man (1952) - Ring Physician (uncredited)
- Just for You (1952) - Raymond
- Captive Women (1952) - Jason
- South Pacific Trail (1952) - Rodney Brewster
- The Magnetic Monster (1953) - Pilot
- The Girls of Pleasure Island (1953) - Lieutenant Commander (uncredited)
- Let's Do It Again (1953) - Black Cat Club Manager (scenes deleted)
- City of Bad Men (1953) - William Brady (uncredited)
- The Big Heat (1953) - Councilman Gillen (uncredited)
- So Big (1953) - Richard 'Dick' Hollis (uncredited)
- The Eddie Cantor Story (1953) - Leo Raymond
- Johnny Dark (1954) - Wellington (uncredited)
- The Benny Goodman Story (1956) - Kel Murray - Orchestra Leader (uncredited)
- The Birds and the Bees (1956) - Guest
- D-Day the Sixth of June (1956) - Ship Captain (uncredited)
- The Toy Tiger (1956) - Executive (uncredited)
- Bundle of Joy (1956) - Doctor (uncredited)
- Beginning of the End (1957) - Norman Taggart - News Editor
- Short Cut to Hell (1957) - Mr. Henry (uncredited)
- The Female Animal (1958) - Al The Director
- Perry Mason - Phil McCabe in "The Case of the Married Monnlighters"
- Colgate Theatre (TV series, 1958) - S1E4 "Mr. Tutt" (or "Strange Counsel")
- The Buccaneer (1958) - Soldier (uncredited)
- The Man in the Net (1959) - Charlie Raines (uncredited)
- Beloved Infidel (1959) - Harry (uncredited)
- Perry Mason (1959) - Frank Patton in "The Case of the Lucky Legs"
- From The Terrace (1960) - Partner (uncredited)
- The Errand Boy (1961) - Serina's Escort at Premiere (uncredited)
- Moon Pilot (1962) - Colonel (uncredited)
- I Saw What You Did (1965) - Tom Ward
- Mirage (1965) - Customer (uncredited)
- The Family Jewels (1965) - (uncredited)
- The Oscar (1966) - Reporter (uncredited)
- Panic in the City (1968) - Mayor (final film role)
