= Zombies of the Stratosphere =

1952 serial film directed by Fred C. Brannon

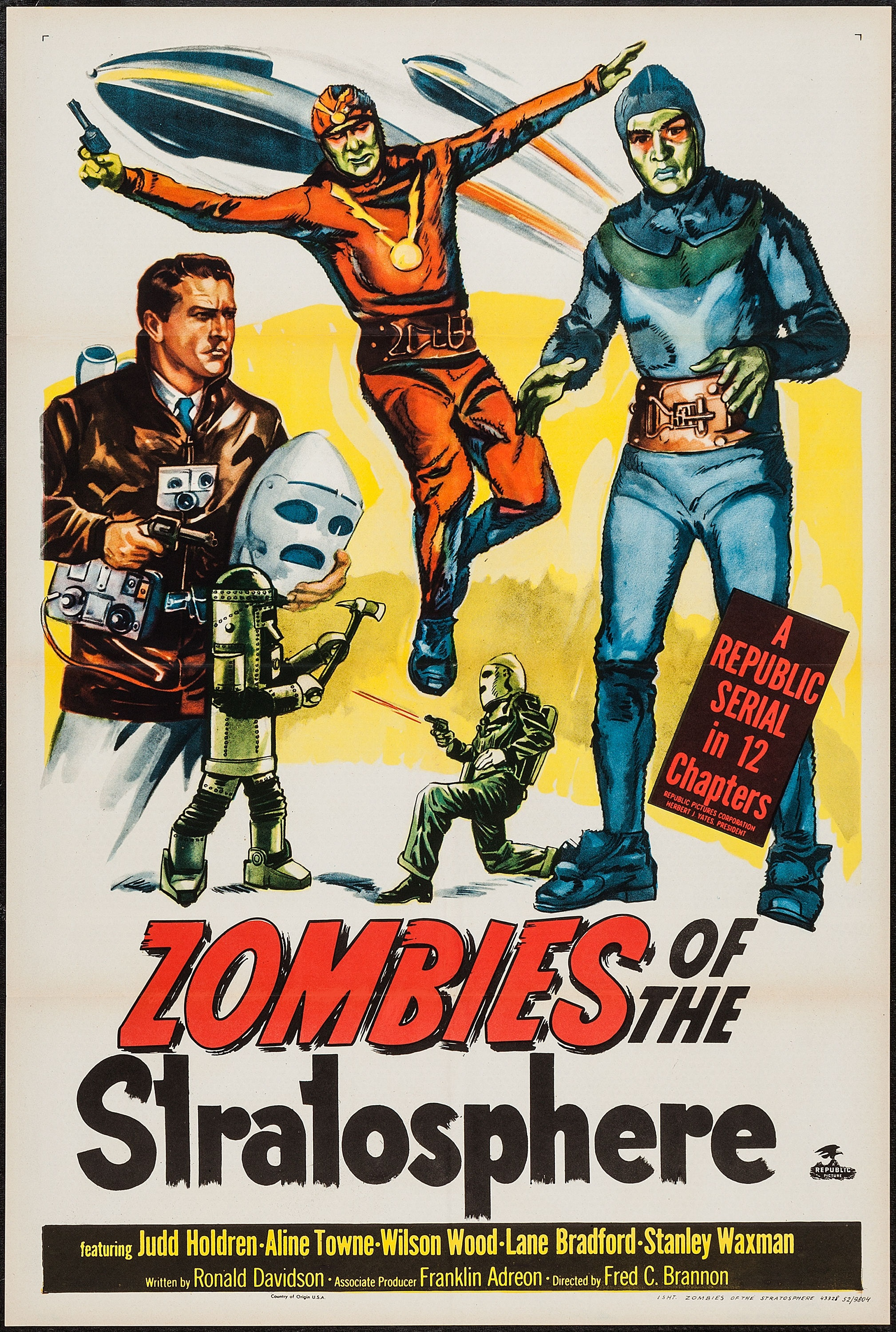
- Theatrical release poster
- Directed by: Fred C. Brannon
- Written by: Ronald Davidson
- Produced by: Franklin Adreon
- Starring: Judd Holdren; Aline Towne; Wilson Wood; Lane Bradford; Stanley Waxman; John Crawford; Craig Kelly; Ray Boyle; Leonard Nimoy
- Cinematography: John MacBurnie
- Music by: Stanley Wilson
- Distributed by: Republic Pictures
- Release date: July 16, 1952
- Running time: 12 chapters (167 minutes (serial); 70 minutes (feature)
- Country: United States
- Language: English
- Budget: $176,357

Zombies of the Stratosphere is a 1952 black and white Republic Studios serial directed by Fred C. Brannon, with a screenplay by Ronald Davidson, and special effects by Republic's Lydecker brothers. It was intended to be Republic's second serial featuring "new hero" Commando Cody and the third 12-chapter serial featuring the rocket-powered flying jacket and helmet introduced in King of the Rocket Men (1949). Instead, for reasons unknown, the hero was renamed "Larry Martin", who must prevent Martian invaders from using a hydrogen bomb to blow Earth out of its orbit, so that the Martians can move a dying Mars into a much closer orbital position to the Sun. As in Radar Men from the Moon (also released in 1952), much of the screen time for each of the dozen chapters is spent on fistfights and car chases between the heroes and a gang of earthly crooks hired by renegade scientist Dr. Harding and his extraterrestrial colleague Marex to steal and stockpile the Atomic supplies needed for construction of the H-bomb.

The serial is notable as one of the first screen appearances of a young Leonard Nimoy, who plays Narab, one of the three Martian invaders.

In 1958, a feature film titled Satan's Satellites, was made by editing down the serial's footage from 167 minutes to a 70 minute runtime.

== Plot ==
Larry Martin, a leader in the Inter-Planetary Patrol, detects a rocketship coming to Earth. He takes to the air in his jet-powered flying suit and helmet to investigate and discovers Martian invaders, led by Marex. With Mars now orbiting too far away from the Sun, its ecology has been dying. The Martian invaders want to swap the orbital positions of Earth and Mars so that Mars will be closer to the Sun. They plan on achieving this by using hydrogen bomb plans stolen from Earth scientists to cause the two planets' orbits to swap positions. They will do so using specifically placed atomic explosions on both worlds. Martin also learns the Martians have Earth accomplices, the traitorous Dr. Harding and two gangsters, Roth and Shane, who bedevil him and his associates, Sue Davis and Bob Wilson.

The Martians set up a base in a cave that can only be reached from underwater, where they begin constructing their H bomb. They make a remotely-controlled robot to supplement their human operatives in acquiring the necessary supplies and funds to complete the project. Eventually, Larry and his comrades gain the upper hand: Marex kills Harding when he attempts to surrender. Roth and Shane are killed when Larry turns the robot against them, while the Martians are brought down in flames in their rocketship after a furious stratosphere raygun battle with Larry in his spaceship. Marex's Martian aide, Narab, survives the crash and tells Larry where to find the underwater cave with the activated H-bomb. Larry arrives just in time to defuse the bomb, seconds before it would have exploded.

=== Chapter titles ===
1. "The Zombie Vanguard" (20min)
2. "Battle of the Rockets" (13min 20s)
3. "Undersea Agents" (13min 20s)
4. "Contraband Cargo" (13min 20s)
5. "The Iron Executioner" (13min 20s)
6. "Murder Mine" (13min 20s)
7. "Death on the Waterfront" (13min 20s)
8. "Hostage for Murder" (13min 20s)
9. "The Human Torpedo" (13min 20s)
10. "Flying Gas Chamber" (13min 20s) – a re-cap chapter
11. "Man vs. Monster" (13min 20s)
12. "Tomb of the Traitors" (13min 20s)

_{Source:}

== Cast ==
- Judd Holdren as Larry Martin
- Aline Towne as Sue Davis
- Wilson Wood as Bob Wilson
- Lane Bradford as Marex
- Stanley Waxman as Dr Harding
- John Crawford as Roth
- Ray Boyle as Shane
- Craig Kelly as Mr Steele
- Leonard Nimoy as Narab
- Robert Garabedian as Elah

== Production ==
Zombies of the Stratosphere was scripted as a sequel to the successful Radar Men from the Moon serial (1952), which introduced an original flying superhero, Commando Cody, played by George Wallace. Republic interrupted production on a planned TV series, also built around that character, titled Commando Cody: Sky Marshal of the Universe, with Judd Holdren now starring as Cody. Just as filming began on the Zombies serial, the name of the hero was changed from "Commando Cody" to "Larry Martin", but he retains the same sidekicks (also renamed), high-tech props, and laboratory facilities that Cody had in the previous Radar Men from the Moon serial.

An addition to the "rocket man" back-pack and helmet, and used for the first time in this serial, is a two-way radio about the size of a lunchbox; Larry Martin wears it hanging heavily from his belt when dressed for flying. This bulky radio is also seen in some stills of Cody in Commando Cody: Sky Marshal of the Universe. As most flying sequences are reused stock footage from earlier "rocket man" serials, the radio usually disappears when Commando Cody is in flight. Martin also uses an ordinary police revolver instead of the ray gun favored by Cody in earlier and later serials.

Zombies of the Stratosphere was budgeted at $172,838, although the final negative cost was $176,357 (a $3,519, or 2%, overspend). It was the cheapest Republic serial of 1952 and was filmed between April 14, and May 1, 1952. At seventeen days, this is tied with King of the Carnival (1955) for the shortest filming period of all Republic serials. The serial's production number was 1933.

Zombies of the Stratosphere reuses the "Republic robot" (somewhat resembling a walking silvery hot-water heater with two ribbed arms that terminate in pincers), along with stock footage of it in action (such as the "bank robbery by robot" scene from Mysterious Doctor Satan) and black-and-white footage from a Republic full color Roy Rogers film. The serial is also heavily padded with footage from their King of the Rocket Men (1949) serial, to which this is a pseudo-sequel. Although the Zombies serial has Martians as the villains, they are not the same Martians as shown in the Republic's earlier, The Purple Monster Strikes (1945) serial. The robot was first seen in Republic's Undersea Kingdom (1936) and prominently featured in their Mysterious Doctor Satan (1940) serials.

=== Stunts ===
- Dale Van Sickel as Larry Martin (doubling Judd Holdren)
- Tom Steele

=== Special effects ===
All the special effects in Zombies of the Stratosphere were produced by the Lydecker brothers, Republic's in-house physical and model effects team. Their flying effects, using a slightly oversized dummy running along an angled wire, were first used in Republic's serials: Darkest Africa (1936) and with even greater impact in Adventures of Captain Marvel (1941).

== Release ==
=== Releases ===
Zombies of the Stratosphere's official release date was July 16, 1952, although this was actually the date the sixth chapter was made available to theatrical film exchanges. This was followed by the theatrical release of Commando Cody, which had been filmed around the time as Zombies, but as a twelve-episode TV miniseries. (Because of Republic's theatrical contract requirements, Commando Cody was released as twelve weekly movie serial chapters. Judd Holdren played the now masked Cody and Aline Towne appeared again as Joan Gilbert.) A 70-minute feature film version of Zombies, created by heavily editing down the serial footage, was released on March 28, 1958 under the title Satan's Satellites as a double feature with Missile Monsters.

=== Television ===
Zombies of the Stratosphere was one of two Republic serials later colorized for 1990s television broadcast.

=== Home media ===
During 1991, the serial was released in its original full-length running time, in black-and-white, on two videodiscs from The Roan Group. In 1995, it was released in the U.S. on VHS by Republic Pictures Home Video, and it was also edited down to just 93 minutes and was colorized for VHS release. The serial was re-released in 2009 as a 2-DVD set from Cheezy Flicks Entertainment in its original full-length and original black-and-white. Zombies of the Stratosphere has since been released on Blu-Ray by Grapevine Video.

== Reception ==
Critics and viewers found the serial to be relatively dull and unimaginative, not as interesting as Radar Men from the Moon. The use of stock footage from earlier serials is not quite as overwhelming as seen in the earlier or later Cody outings, as greater emphasis is placed on fistfights rather than scenes using the rocket back-pack. Holdren's performance is often stiff and amateurish, especially when compared to the professionalism of the old Republic pros who surround him on screen. Cline describes this serial as just a "quickie".
