= Walter Woolf King =

American actor and singer (1899–1984)

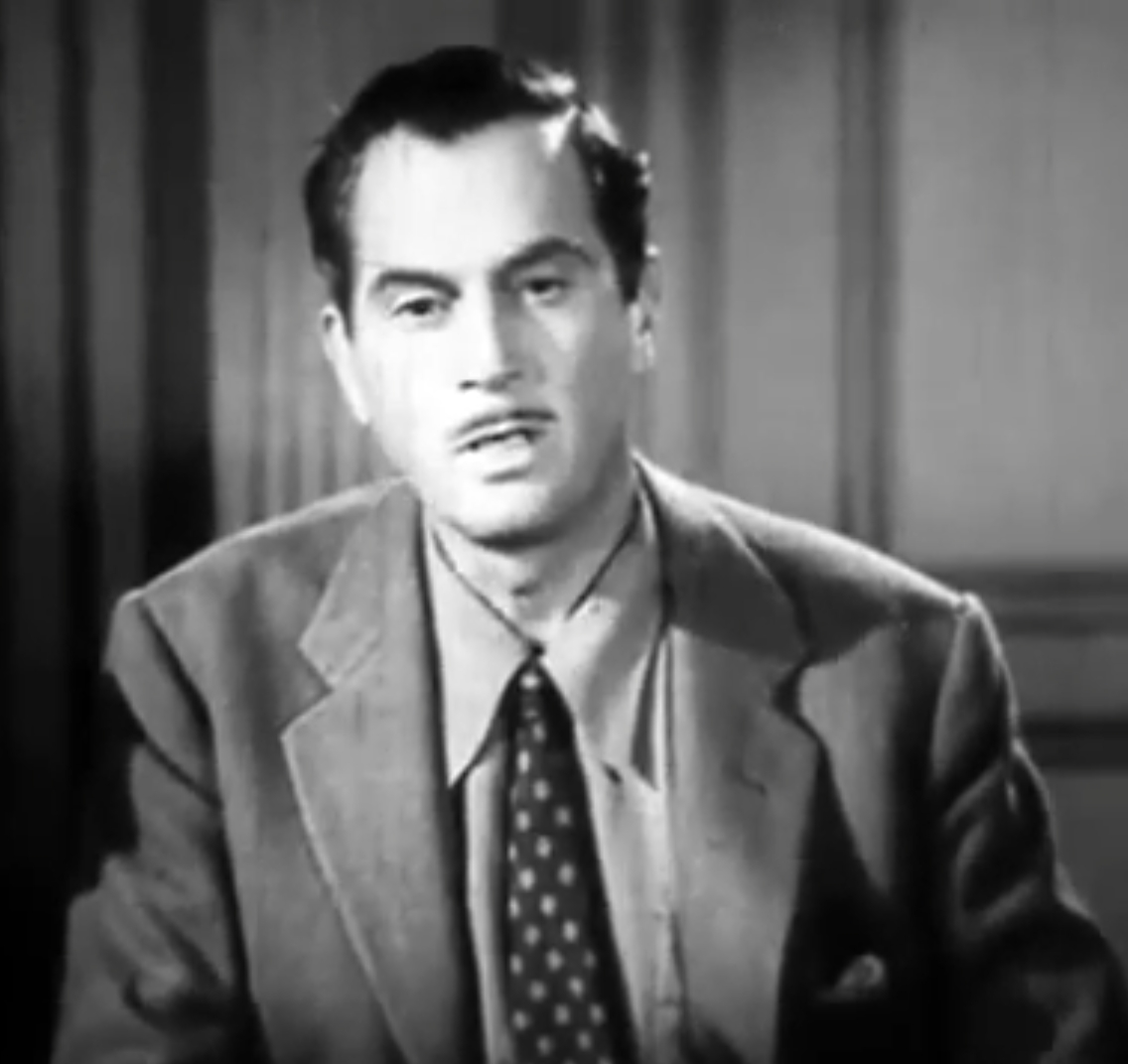
- King in Today I Hang (1942)
- Born: Walter Woolf; November 2, 1899; San Francisco, California, U.S.
- Died: October 24, 1984 (aged 84); Beverly Hills, California, U.S.
- Occupations: Actor, singer
- Years active: 1918–1977
- Spouse(s): Ernestyne Bachrach (m. 193?; div. 19??)
- Children: 2

Walter Woolf King (born Walter Woolf; November 2, 1899 – October 24, 1984) was an American film, television and stage actor and singer.

== Career ==
Born in San Francisco, California on November 2, 1899, King was raised in Salt Lake City, Utah, where he sang in the Mormon Tabernacle Choir. When he performed in a production in Ogden, Utah, in 1916, a local newspaper described him as "a clean cut young actor with a baritone voice that should take him to the top rank in musical comedy". It added that his voice was "far superior in range and quality" to Joseph Santley.

King and a friend, Charles Lemaire, left their homes in Salt Lake City and began a vaudeville act with Lemaire playing piano and Woolf singing. They progressed from being a fill-in act to fairly good positions on bills at smaller vaudeville theaters. Eventually the act broke up with Lemaire leaving show business while Woolf went on tour with a singing act.

King made his Broadway debut in 1920, and became a well-known baritone in operettas and musical comedies. King billed himself as Walter Woolf and Walter King early in his career, eventually settling on a combination of all three names in the mid-1930s. He used his birth name, Walter Woolf, until he went to Hollywood. There he became Walter King to appease his employers. He used that name until he returned to Broadway to appear in May Wine. Producer Lawrence Schwab had known him as Walter Woolf and did not like the name Walter King; they compromised on use of Walter Woolf King for the play.

King's film debut came in Golden Dawn (1930).

King acted in the Community Playhouse in Pasadena, California, in 1934.

In 1936, King was host of the Flying Red Horse Tavern on CBS radio.

King began his film career in musicals but quickly moved into supporting roles. He is probably best remembered today for his villainous roles in two films starring the Marx Brothers: A Night at the Opera (1935) and Go West (1940). He also appeared with Laurel & Hardy in Swiss Miss (1938). King made several appearances on radio and later became an actors' agent. During the 1950s and 1960s, he was seen in several often uncredited bit parts and smaller roles in television and films.

One credited TV role was as “Major Clinton” in the 1958 S1E38 offering, “The Monty Britton Story” on Wagon Train.

In the first episode of The Munsters he is credited for his role as George Washington. His final appearance was in the 1977 TV movie One in a Million: The Ron LeFlore Story.

== Personal life and death ==
King was married to Ernestyne Bachrach. They had a daughter, Barbara Jean Meier, and a son, Walter Woolf King Jr. He died of a heart attack in Beverly Hills, California, on October 24, 1984, aged 88.

== Filmography ==
Year	Title	Role	Notes
1930	Golden Dawn	Tom Allen	
1933	Girl Without a Room	Arthur Copeland	
1934	Embarrassing Moments	Paul	
1935	Lottery Lover	Prince Midanoff	
1935	One More Spring	Morris Rosenberg	
1935	Ginger	Daniel Parker	
1935	Spring Tonic	José	
1935	A Night at the Opera	Rudolfo Lassparri	
1937	Call It a Day	Paul Francis	
1938	Walking Down Broadway	Jeff Hoffman	
1938	Swiss Miss	Victor Albert	
1939	Society Smugglers	Roy Allen Massey	
1939	Big Town Czar	Paul Burgess	
1939	The House of Fear	Carleton	
1939	Balalaika	Captain Michael Sibirsky	
1940	Go West	John Beecher	
1941	Melody for Three	Antoine Pirelle	
1942	Today I Hang	Jim O'Brien	
1942	A Yank in Libya	Mike Malone	
1942	Smart Alecks	Dr. Ormsby	
1942	Between Us Girls	King - an actor	
1943	Yanks Ahoy	Captain Gillis	
1952	Stars and Stripes Forever	President's Aide	Uncredited
1953	Taxi	Business Man	
1953	Tonight We Sing	Gritti	
1953	Call Me Madam	Secretary of State	Uncredited
1953	City That Never Sleeps	Hotel Manager	Uncredited
1953	Affair with a Stranger	Harry Casino	Uncredited
1955	Alfred Hitchcock Presents	Doctor Pritchard	Season 1 Episode 8: "Our Cook's a Treasure"
1955	Francis in the Navy	Jensen	Uncredited
1956	The Bottom of the Bottle	Grant	
1956	The Ten Commandments	Herald	Uncredited
1956	Three Brave Men	Admiral Mason	Uncredited
1957	An Affair to Remember	Doctor in Hospital	Uncredited
1957	The Joker Is Wild	Mr. Page	Uncredited
1957	The Helen Morgan Story	Florenz Ziegfeld	
1958	Alfred Hitchcock Presents	Mob Boss	Season 3 Episode 14: "The Percentage"
1958	Kathy O'	Donald C. Faber	
1958	Hong Kong Confidential	CIA Chief	Uncredited
1961	The Outsider	Civilian	Uncredited
1963	The Alfred Hitchcock Hour	Senator Hayes	Season 1 Episode 29: "The Dark Pool"
1963	The Alfred Hitchcock Hour	Mr. Roberts the Executive	Season 2 Episode 2: "A Nice Touch"
1963	The Householder	Professor	
1963	The Raiders	Colonel DeKoenig	Uncredited
1964	The Alfred Hitchcock Hour	Judge	Season 2 Episode 31: "Isabel"
1964	Where Love Has Gone	Bank Board Member	Uncredited
1964	Della	Sam Jordon	
1967	Rosie!	Judge	
1970	Airport	Cindy's Father	Uncredited
