= Today I Hang =

1942 film by Oliver Drake

- Directed by: Oliver Drake
- Written by: Oliver Drake (writer)
- Produced by: Arthur Alexander (associate producer); Max Alexander (producer); George R. Batcheller Jr. (executive producer); Alfred Stern (producer)
- Starring: Walter Woolf King, Mona Barrie, William Farnum, Harry Woods
- Cinematography: Edward Linden
- Edited by: Charles Henkel Jr.
- Music by: Johnny Lange (music director)
- Distributed by: Producers Releasing Corporation
- Release date: January 9, 1942
- Running time: 63 minutes
- Country: United States
- Language: English

Today I Hang is a 1942 American film directed by Oliver Drake and produced and released by Producers Releasing Corporation. This film is in the public domain.

== Plot ==
A man is framed for the murder of a wealthy importer and the theft of a valuable necklace. The victim's widow doesn't believe he is guilty and sets out to prove his innocence.

== Cast ==
- Walter Woolf King as Jim O'Brien
- Mona Barrie as Martha Courtney
- William Farnum as Warden Burke
- Harry Woods as Henry Courtney
- James Craven as Joseph Rand
- Michael Raffetto as Roger Lanning
- Sam Bernard as Slick Pheeney
- Robert Fiske as Det. Johnson
- Paul Scardon as Hobbs
