= Society Smugglers =

- British poster
- Directed by: Joe May
- Written by: Arthur T. Horman; Earl Felton
- Produced by: Ken Goldsmith
- Starring: Preston Foster; Irene Hervey; Walter Woolf King
- Cinematography: John W. Boyle
- Edited by: Philip Cahn
- Music by: Charles Previn
- Production company: Universal Pictures
- Distributed by: Universal Pictures
- Release date: March 1, 1939
- Running time: 67 minutes
- Country: United States
- Language: English

Society Smugglers is a 1939 American crime film directed by Joe May and starring Preston Foster, Irene Hervey and Walter Woolf King. It was made and distributed by Universal Pictures. The film sets were designed by the art director Jack Otterson.

== Cast ==
- Preston Foster as Sully
- Irene Hervey as Joan Martin
- Walter Woolf King as Massey
- Frank Jenks as Emery
- Fred Keating as Larry Kearns
- Regis Toomey as Johnny Beebe
- Frances Robinson as Mary Larson
- Raymond Parker as Ames
- Clay Clement as Harrison
- Doris Rankin as Miss Wexley
- Harry Hayden as Dr. Lee
- Frank Reicher as Jones
- Milburn Stone as Peter Garfield
- Jack Norton as Prentis
- Michael Mark as Rug Merchant
- George Lynn as Austin
- Eddie Acuff as Radio Expert
- Mary Field as Secretary
- James Baker as Plainclothesman
- Frank Bischell as Newsboy
- Heinie Conklin as Mailman
- Kernan Cripps as Detective
- Robert Darrell as Radio Technician
- Edward Earle as Customs Officer
- Billy Engle as Patient
- Douglas Evans as Radio Announcer
- Eddie Fetherston as Steward
- Allen Fox as Photographer
- Eddie Hall as Taxi Cab Driver
- Sibyl Harris as Matron
- Ben Lewis as Jeff
- Gerald Mohr as Footman
- Lyle Moraine as Cabin Boy
- Christiane Tourneur as Claire
- Emmett Vogan as Clemons
- Max Wagner as Taxi Driver

== Bibliography ==
- Monaco, James. The Encyclopedia of Film. Perigee Books, 1991.
