= Commando Cody: Sky Marshal of the Universe =

Television series

- Commando Cody (Judd Holdren) and Joan Gilbert (Aline Towne)
- Also known as: Commando Cody
- Genre: Science fiction
- Written by: Ronald Davidson; Barry Shipman
- Directed by: Harry Keller; Franklin Adreon; Fred C. Brannon
- Starring: Judd Holdren; Aline Towne; Gregory Gaye; Craig Kelly
- Composer: Stanley Wilson
- Country of origin: United States
- Original language: English
- No. of seasons: 1
- No. of episodes: 12

Production
- Cinematography: Bud Thackery
- Editor: Cliff Bell Sr.
- Running time: 25-30 minutes

Original release
- Network: NBC
- Release: July 16 – October 8, 1955

Related
- Radar Men from the Moon

Commando Cody: Sky Marshal of the Universe (or, informally, Commando Cody) is a 1953 twelve-chapter movie serial from Republic Pictures, which began life as a proposed syndicated television series. It consists of twelve 25-minute sequential episodes directed by Harry Keller, Franklin Adreon, and Fred C. Brannon. It stars Judd Holdren, Aline Towne, Gregory Gaye, William Schallert, Richard Crane, and Craig Kelly.

Originally intended to be broadcast on television as a 12-episode weekly series, Sky Marshal was first released theatrically in 1953 as a 12-chapter weekly serial; it was syndicated to television on NBC in 1955. The Commando Cody character was first introduced in Republic's earlier serial Radar Men from the Moon (1952), with actor George Wallace in the title role. Judd Holdren was to play the Commando Cody character in Zombies of the Stratosphere (also 1952), but his character was renamed "Larry Martin" for that serial.

== Plot ==
Dangerous weather and climate changes are ravaging the Earth. Masked super-scientist Commando Cody is approached by the U.S. government to investigate. Among the tools at his disposal are a sonic-powered one-man flying suit with an aerodynamic helmet and a new Cody-designed and built rocket ship.

With his colleagues Joan and Ted (later replaced by Dick), he ascertains the disasters are being caused by space-alien forces led by a mysterious "Ruler" of unknown planetary origins, with occasional help from hired, Earth-born criminals. Warding off various dangers, Cody and his associates are able to methodically close in on the culprits and reveal that The Ruler is from our sister world, Venus.

In the final episode, Cody is able to capture The Ruler and his soldiers on Mercury with the help of the persecuted Mercurians and their queen. This brings a quick end to the Ruler's influence on Venus and a peace treaty soon follows, ending the Venus-Earth conflict.

== Cast ==
- Judd Holdren as Commando Cody
- Aline Towne as Joan Gilbert
- William Schallert as Ted Richards (Chs. 1–3)
- Richard Crane as Dick Preston (Chs. 4–12)
- Gregory Gaye as The Ruler
- Craig Kelly as Commissioner Henderson
- Peter Brocco as Dr. Varney (Chs. 1–2)
- Lyle Talbot as Henchman Baylor (Chs. 4,5,6,7,9,10)
- Mauritz Hugo as Henchman Mason (Chs. 4,5,6,9,10)
- Joanne Jordan as The Queen of Mercury (Ch. 12)
- Gloria Pall as The Moon Girl
- John Crawford
- Zon Murray
- Stanley Waxman
- I. Stanford Jolley
- Bill Henry
- Kenneth MacDonald
- William Fawcett
- Lane Bradford
- Denver Pyle
- Sidney Mason

== Release and chapters ==
The serial was first released theatrically in 1953 with twelve weekly approximately 30-minute chapters:

1. "Enemies of the Universe"
2. "Atomic Peril"
3. "Cosmic Vengeance"
4. "Nightmare Typhoon"
5. "War of the Space Giants"
6. "Destroyers of the Sun"
7. "Robot Monster from Mars"
8. "The Hydrogen Hurricane"
9. "Solar Sky Raiders"
10. "S.O.S. Ice Age"
11. "Lost in Outer Space"
12. "Captives of the Zero Hour"

The serial was later syndicated to television in 1955 by Republic's TV arm Hollywood Television Service, airing on NBC stations. The original chapters were filmed with a running-time of 25 minutes each, before commercials, requiring no further editing for a half-hour television slot of that era.

== Production ==
While Commando Cody was originally filmed as a twelve-part TV series, union contract issues forced Republic to first exhibit them in theaters as a 12-part weekly movie serial. The TV episodes actually built on each other in chronological order, lacking the traditional cliffhanger endings that characterized theatrical serials, which has resulted in its being omitted altogether from many reference works on film serials.

Sky Marshal was meant as a prequel to Republic's Radar Men from the Moon movie serial. The first chapter has characters Joan and Ted, Commando Cody's established sidekicks in Radar Men, applying for their jobs and meeting Cody for the first time.

There was a substantial break between filming the first three TV episodes and the last nine, during which time Republic set about filming another Cody movie serial called Zombies of the Stratosphere. It starred Judd Holdren as Cody, Aline Towne as Joan, and Wilson Wood as Ted. For reasons unknown, however, the Republic revised the principal characters' names, and "Commando Cody" became "Larry Martin".

The third TV episode ends with the apparent death of The Ruler, suggesting that Republic may have reconsidered filming the remaining nine and just edit the three it had already completed into a 75-minute science fiction feature film.

By the time filming finally resumed on the Sky Marshal TV series, Republic had lost actor William Schallert as Cody's male colleague "Ted Richards" (played by William Bakewell in Radar Men). A replacement was found in Richard Crane, a year before his best-remembered role starring as the title character on the science fiction TV series Rocky Jones, Space Ranger. The Ruler also gained a female sidekick, played by Gloria Pall, though she had almost no dialog or action scenes.

=== Flying jacket and helmet ===
Commando Cody reuses the "rocket man" flying jacket and helmet costume, first seen in Republic's serial King of the Rocket Men (1949), to which the other Cody serials are not related. Stock footage was also reused from their other serials, including The Purple Monster Strikes. The Sky Marshal series also recycles characters, sets, props, and concepts from the Radar Men serial. Two streamlined, bullet-shaped prop helmets were reused again with the "rocket man" costume. The first was made of lighter weight materials and worn only during the various stunt action scenes; during filming, the single-hinged visors on both frequently warped and would stick open or closed.

When not in his flying jacket and helmet, Cody wears a black military tunic with many insignia and a cap, instead of the regular business suit seen in Radar Men. Cody also wears a black domino mask to hide his real identity. Holdren always suspected this was due to the producers not wanting to take a chance that he might walk out if any future demands for a higher salary were not met, as Clayton Moore had done on the popular The Lone Ranger TV series. The mask presumably served to conceal any change of actor, should the part ever need recasting, although disguising the change of lead with a domino mask had not worked well in the case of the Lone Ranger series.

=== Setting ===
As the story opens, it is the near future as seen from the perspective of the early 1950s. Earth is in radio contact with civilizations on planets in the Solar System, as well as planets in other, distant planetary systems, and Commando Cody has just built the world's first spaceship. The rest of the world appears unchanged by these galactic developments. (The exterior of Cody's headquarters building is actually a Republic Pictures office building.) A mysterious despot, known only as "The Ruler", his base planet even being unknown, is trying to take over the Earth with various disastrous devices. Cody is enlisted by the American government to put an end to the trouble, which takes him into the stratosphere, into outer space, and even to other worlds. The Ruler is finally brought down on Mercury, with the aid of the Mercurian Queen and her soldiers.

For the series, a number of new outer space scenes were filmed that had not been seen before in the Republic serials, including "space walks" for several exterior spaceship repairs; aerial raygun duels between "hero" and "enemy" spaceships and black star fields (rather than daylight and cloud-spotted skies) for backgrounds, when Cody's or the Ruler's spaceships were shown outside the Earth's atmosphere.

Cody and his associates use special badges that conceal radios to communicate with one another, prefiguring similar communication badges used more than 30 years later in Star Trek: The Next Generation. There were futuristic props and sets, as well as shots of the intricate model-rocket special effects work of Republic's Howard and Theodore Lydecker; the spaceships of Cody and The Ruler were the same basic shooting miniature with different attachments and markings added to make them appear different.

=== "Rocket man" themed theatrical movie serials in release order ===
- King of the Rocket Men
- Radar Men from the Moon
- Commando Cody
- Zombies of the Stratosphere

== Television series or film serial? ==
The release of Commando Cody as a weekly theatrical serial, because it had been originally filmed as a TV series, led to controversy among serial purists: Should it be included in Republic's canon of film serials, or should it be considered as a different animal, a TV series? The resolution to this question was historically resolved on the basis that the episodes did not end with traditional film-serial cliffhanger endings, but rather found all the protagonists together and safe from whatever menace they had faced during the episode. This resolution, however, ignored the facts that a single conflict existed throughout all the episodes between the protagonists and the chief antagonist, the Ruler; that his overall motivations and ability to menace were never abated until the final episode; that most episodes included a reference to the preceding episode's adventure and would not make sense if seen in anything other but sequential order and in the totality of the 12 chapters; and that, in its origins in literature, a serial's episodes did not usually have, much less require, a protagonist-in-mortal-peril cliffhanger ending to justify being categorized as serials, and this was also true of the earliest film serials, such as The Hazards of Helen.

Reference works on movie serials, however, generally exclude the serial version of Sky Marshal, or simply mention it in passing as a later Republic TV series.

== Home media ==
Commando Cody: Sky Marshal of the Universe, the 1955 syndicated TV series, has been available for decades on all manner of Home Video formats, and was the first of the "rocket man" adventures to be released on Blu-Ray from Olive Films on September 13, 2016.

== See also ==
- List of film serials by year
- List of film serials by studio

Preceded by Jungle Drums of Africa (1953)	Republic Serial; Commando Cody: Sky Marshal of the Universe (1953)	Succeeded by Canadian Mounties vs Atomic Invaders (1953)
