= Lydecker House =

House in Los Angeles, California, United States

Coordinates: 34.1393°N 118.3892°W

The Lydecker House, also known as the Lydecker Hilltop House, is a Streamline Moderne home built by Howard and Theodore Lydecker in Los Angeles, California. Used as a film location for its distinctive architecture, it was designated a Los Angeles Historic-Cultural Monument by the City of Los Angeles on May 14, 2008.
