= Captain Midnight (serial) =

1942 film by James W. Horne

- Theatrical release insert poster
- Directed by: James W. Horne
- Screenplay by: Basil Dickey; George Plympton; Wyndham Gittens; Jack Stanley
- Based on: based on the radio serial Captain Midnight
- Produced by: Larry Darmour
- Starring: Dave O'Brien; Dorothy Short; James Craven; Bryant Washburn
- Narrated by: Knox Manning
- Cinematography: James S. Brown Jr.
- Edited by: Dwight Caldwell; Earl Turner
- Music by: Lee Zahler
- Color process: Black and white
- Production company: Columbia Pictures
- Distributed by: Columbia Pictures
- Release date: February 15, 1942
- Running time: 270 minutes (15 episodes)
- Country: United States
- Language: English

Captain Midnight is a 1942 American serial film. It was Columbia Pictures 17th released serial and was based upon the radio adventure serial of the same name, broadcast from 1938 to 1949. Captain Midnight was only one of the many aviation serials released during World War II, whose leading characters were derived from early pulp magazines and radio show favorites.

== Plot ==
Captain Albright is an extremely skilled aviator, better known by his alter ego as Captain Midnight. He is assigned to neutralize the sinister Ivan Shark, an evil enemy scientist who is aerial bombing major American cities with his unmarked aircraft. Captain Midnight leads the Secret Squadron, whose staff includes Chuck Ramsay, Midnight's ward, and Ichabod 'Icky' Mudd, the Squadron's chief mechanic. Shark has developed a highly efficient mercenary organization. He is aided by his daughter, Fury, his highly intelligent second in command, and Gardo the henchman, and Fang, an Asian ally. Shark is after a new aviation range finder invented by the altruistic scientist, John Edwards, whose beautiful daughter, Joyce, they attempt to capture in order to blackmail the patriotic inventor. Captain Midnight and the Secret Squadron continually battle the henchmen, thwarting Shark's evil plans, while avoiding destruction at every turn by making daring escapes during the serial's 15 weekly chapters.

== Cast ==
- Dave O'Brien as Captain Albright / Captain Midnight
- Dorothy Short as Joyce Edwards
- James Craven as Ivan Shark
- Sam Edwards as Chuck Ramsey
- Guy Wilkerson as Ichabod 'Icky' Mudd
- Bryant Washburn as John Edwards
- Luana Walters as Fury Shark
- Joe Girard as Major Steel (as Joe Girard)
- Ray Teal as Borgman - Henchman #8
- George Pembroke as Dr. James Jordan
- Chuck Hamilton as Martel, Henchman #7 (as Charles Hamilton)
- Al Ferguson as Gardo- Henchman #5

== Chapter titles ==
1. Mysterious Pilot
2. The Stolen Range Finder
3. The Captured Plane
4. Mistaken Identity
5. Ambushed Ambulance
6. Weird Waters
7. Menacing Fates
8. Shells of Evil
9. The Drop to Doom
10. The Hidden Bomb
11. Sky Terror
12. Burning Bomber
13. Death in the Cockpit
14. Scourge of Revenge
15. The Fatal Hour

_{Source:}

== Release ==
The serial was released in Latin America in November 1942, under the title El Capitán Medianoche, and was shown in English with Spanish subtitles.

== See also ==
- List of film serials by year
- List of film serials by studio
