= Embarrassing Moments (1934 film) =

1934 film by Edward Laemmle

- Directed by: Edward Laemmle
- Screenplay by: Charles Logue; Dickson Morgan; Gladys Buchanan Unger
- Story by: William Anthony McGuire
- Produced by: Stanley Bergerman; Carl Laemmle, Jr.
- Starring: Chester Morris; Marian Nixon; Walter Woolf King; Alan Mowbray; George E. Stone; John Wray
- Cinematography: Charles J. Stumar
- Edited by: Daniel Mandell
- Music by: Edward Ward
- Production company: Universal Pictures
- Distributed by: Universal Pictures
- Release date: September 1, 1934
- Running time: 61 minutes
- Country: United States
- Language: English

Embarrassing Moments is a 1934 American comedy film directed by Edward Laemmle and written by Charles Logue, Dickson Morgan and Gladys Buchanan Unger. The film stars Chester Morris, Marian Nixon, Walter Woolf King, Alan Mowbray, George E. Stone and John Wray. The film was released on September 1, 1934, by Universal Pictures.

== Plot ==
Complications arising out of an attempt to cure a practical joker by his own methods.

== Cast ==
- Chester Morris as Jerry Randolph
- Marian Nixon as Jane
- Walter Woolf King as Paul
- Alan Mowbray as Aheam
- George E. Stone as Louie
- John Wray as Slug
- Henry Armetta as Morganza
- Huntley Gordon as Runyon
- Gay Seabrook as Miss Dodd
- Herman Bing as Bartender
- Virginia Sale as Mother
- Jane Darwell as Mrs. Stuckelberger
- Charles C. Wilson as Attorney
- Christian J. Frank as Man
- Carl Miller as Man
- Lois January as Tipsy Girl
