= Dangerous Venture =

1947 film by George Archainbaud

- Theatrical release poster
- Directed by: George Archainbaud
- Screenplay by: Doris Schroeder
- Produced by: Lewis J. Rachmil
- Starring: William Boyd; Andy Clyde; Rand Brooks; Fritz Leiber; Douglas Evans; Harry Cording
- Cinematography: Mack Stengler
- Edited by: Fred W. Berger
- Music by: David Chudnow
- Production company: Hopalong Cassidy Productions
- Distributed by: United Artists
- Release date: May 23, 1947
- Running time: 59 minutes
- Country: United States
- Language: English

Dangerous Venture is a 1947 American Western film, directed by George Archainbaud and written by Doris Schroeder. The film stars: William Boyd, Andy Clyde, Rand Brooks, Fritz Leiber, Douglas Evans and Harry Cording. The film was released on May 23, 1947, by United Artists.

== Plot ==
This movie was a western-based cowboy and Indians movies. It included the traditional idea of Indians and cowboys fighting against each other over taken land. William Boyd played a risk-taking cowboy, who was going to avenge the death of his family due to the aggravated aggression of the natives. This movie is action packed and highly considered a classic.

== Cast ==
- William Boyd as Hopalong Cassidy
- Andy Clyde as California Carlson
- Rand Brooks as Lucky Jenkins
- Fritz Leiber as Chief Xeoli
- Douglas Evans as Dr. Grimes Atwood
- Harry Cording as Dan Morgan
- Betty Alexander as Dr. Sue Harmon
- Francis McDonald as Henchman Kane
- Neyle Morrow as Jose
- Patricia Tate as Talu
- Bob Faust as Henchman Stark
- Kenneth Tobey as Red
- Jack Quinn as The Marshal
- Bill Nestell as Pete, the Cook
