= Sky High (1951 film) =

1951 film by Sam Newfield

- Directed by: Sam Newfield
- Screenplay by: Orville H. Hampton
- Produced by: Sigmund Neufeld
- Starring: Sid Melton; Mara Lynn; Sam Flint; Douglas Evans; Fritz Feld; Marc Krah; Margia Dean; Paul Bryar; John Phillips; Thayer Roberts; John Pelletti
- Cinematography: Jack Greenhalgh
- Edited by: Carl Pierson
- Music by: Bert Shefter
- Distributed by: Lippert Pictures
- Release date: October 19, 1951
- Running time: 60 minutes
- Country: United States
- Language: English

Sky High is a 1951 American comedy film directed by Sam Newfield and starring Sid Melton, Mara Lynn, Sam Flint, Douglas Evans and Fritz Feld. The film's music was composed by Bert Shefter.

== Cast ==
- Sid Melton as Herbert Pumice / Muscrat Maxie McClure
- Mara Lynn as Sally
- Sam Flint as Col. Baker
- Douglas Evans as Maj. Talbot
- Fritz Feld as Dr. Kapok
- Marc Krah as Elmer Smith - The Boss
- Margia Dean as Cpl. Lily Gaylord
- Paul Bryar as Sgt. Kurt Petrov
- John Phillips as Lt. Col. Turbojet
- Thayer Roberts as Maj. Catastrophe
- John Pelletti as George Grady
