= Captain Video: Master of the Stratosphere =

1951 film by Spencer Gordon Bennet and Wallace Grissell

- Judd Holdren and a native of Atoma
- Directed by: Spencer Gordon Bennet; Wallace Grissell
- Screenplay by: Royal K. Cole; Sherman L. Lowe; Joseph F. Poland
- Story by: George H. Plympton
- Produced by: Sam Katzman
- Starring: Judd Holdren; Larry Stewart
- Cinematography: Fayte M. Browne
- Edited by: Earl Turner
- Color process: Black and white
- Production company: Sam Katzman Productions
- Distributed by: Columbia Pictures
- Release date: December 27, 1951
- Running time: 287 minutes (15 episodes)
- Country: United States
- Language: English

Captain Video: Master of the Stratosphere is an American adventure horror science fiction film 15-chapter serial released by Columbia Pictures in 1951. It was directed by Spencer Gordon Bennet and Wallace A. Grissel with a screenplay by Royal G. Cole, Sherman I. Lowe and Joseph F. Poland, based on a treatment by George H. Plympton. The serial is unique for several reasons--- in particular, it is the only film serial ever based on a television program, Captain Video and His Video Rangers.

In this film, an extraterrestrial dictator plans to conquer the planet Earth by orchestrating climate change on a planetary scale.

== Plot ==
Judd Holdren, in what was only his second starring screen role, plays Captain Video, the leader of a group of crime-fighters known as the Video Rangers. He faces an interplanetary menace, as the evil dictator of the planet Atoma, Vultura (Gene Roth) and his lackey, the traitorous earth scientist Dr. Tobor (George Eldredge) are planning to conquer the planet Earth, by controlling the weather. Climate change is the aliens' weapon.

== Cast ==
- Judd Holdren as Captain Video
- Larry Stewart as Ranger
- George Eldredge as Dr. Tobor
- Gene Roth as Vultura
- Don C. Harvey as Gallagher (as Don Harvey)
- William Fawcett as Alpha [Chs. 1–3,7,15]
- Jack Ingram as Henchman Aker [Chs. 1,7,10–14]
- I. Stanford Jolley as Zorol [Chs. 8–9]
- Skelton Knaggs as Retner
- Jimmy Stark as Ranger Rogers
- Rusty Wescoatt as Henchman Beal [Chs. 1,7,11]
- Zon Murray as Henchman Elko [Chs. 1,7,10–14]

== Production ==
Captain Video: Master of the Stratosphere was the only serial adapted from television.

It was one of Katzman's first forays into science fiction and was soon followed by The Lost Planet.

As produced by Sam Katzman, the serial had a production budget much larger than the famously small budget of the DuMont Television Network's live daily television series.

Captain Video and his teenaged sidekick, the otherwise nameless "Video Ranger" (Larry Stewart), must make frequent visits both to Atoma and to another distant planet, Theros. Both Atoma and Theros are filmed at Bronson Canyon, and Vasquez Rocks, so to distinguish the two, the Atoma footage is tinted pink and the Theros footage is tinted green in the original release prints. These colored scenes were processed by Cinecolor.

This was the second of only three science fiction serials released by Columbia. The third, The Lost Planet (1953), is a virtual sequel although with different character names.

== Release ==
=== Theatrical ===
Captain Video: Master of the Stratosphere was very successful when first released to theaters, and kept playing long after other serials had been retired to the vaults. It is one of only two serials that Columbia reissued three times (in 1958, 1960, and 1963).

== Critical reception ==
Harmon and Glut describe this serial as a "rather shoddy, low budget space cliffhanger."

== Gadgets ==
The serial includes several science fiction gadgets of the era. The Opticon Scillometer was used for looking through walls. Objects were made to disappear with the Isotropic Radiation Curtain. The Mu-ray Camera could photograph lingering images after the event. Temporary madness could be caused with the Psychosomatic Weapon. A variation on Radar was entitled the Radionic Directional Beam and the Radionic Guide and a Vibrator gun that worked like a Tazer.

== Chapter titles ==
1. Journey into Space
2. Menace of Atoma
3. Captain Video's Peril
4. Entombed in Ice
5. Flames of Atoma
6. Astray in the Stratosphere
7. Blasted by the Atomic Eye
8. Invisible Menace
9. Video Springs a Trap
10. Menace of the Mystery Metal
11. Weapon of Destruction
12. Robot Rocket
13. Mystery of Station X
14. Vengeance of Vultura
15. Video vs. Vultura

_{Source:}

== See also ==
- 1951 in film
- List of science fiction films of the 1950s

Preceded by Mysterious Island (1951)	Columbia serial The Mysterious Pilot (1951)	Succeeded by King of the Congo (1952)
