= Purple Heart Diary =

1951 film

- Directed by: Richard Quine
- Written by: Frances Langford (story); William Sackheim (screenplay)
- Produced by: Sam Katzman
- Starring: Frances Langford
- Cinematography: William P. Whitley
- Edited by: Henry Batista
- Distributed by: Columbia Pictures
- Release date: November 12, 1951
- Running time: 73 minutes
- Country: United States
- Language: English

Purple Heart Diary is a 1951 American drama film directed by Richard Quine, produced by Sam Katzman and released by Columbia Pictures. The film stars Frances Langford and Judd Holdren.

== Plot ==
During World War II, a singing trio embarks on a tour to entertain wounded soldiers and becomes involved with a severely injured soldier who is in love with a nurse.

== Cast ==
- Frances Langford as Herself
- Judd Holdren as Lt. Mike McCormick
- Ben Lessy as Himself
- Tony Romano as Himself
- Aline Towne as Lt. Cathy Dietrich
- Harry Guardino as Lt. Roberts
- Brett King as Lt. Rocky Castro
