= Radar Men from the Moon =

1952 film by Fred C. Brannon

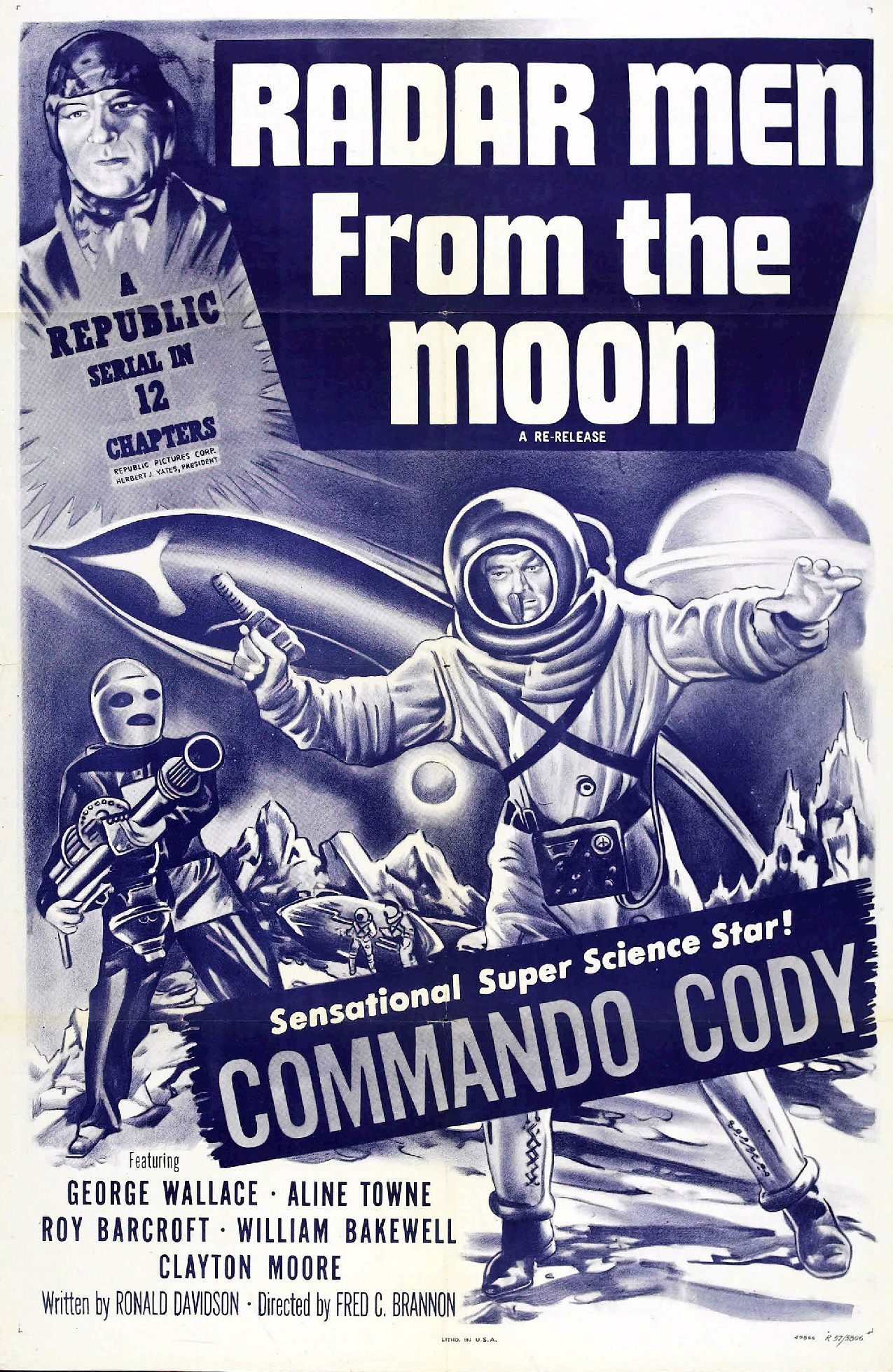
- Theatrical release poster
- Directed by: Fred C. Brannon
- Written by: Ronald Davidson
- Produced by: Franklin Adreon (associate producer)
- Starring: George Wallace; Aline Towne; Roy Barcroft
- Cinematography: John MacBurnie
- Edited by: Cliff Bell
- Music by: Stanley Wilson
- Distributed by: Republic Pictures
- Release dates: January 9, 1952 (U.S. serial); September 30, 1957 (U.S. re-release)
- Running time: 12 chapters (167 minutes) (serial); 100 minutes (TV)
- Country: United States
- Language: English
- Budget: $172,840 (negative cost: $185,702)

Radar Men from the Moon is a 1952 Republic Pictures' 12-chapter movie serial, the first Commando Cody serial starring newcomer George Wallace as Cody, Aline Towne as his sidekick Joan Gilbert, and serial veteran Roy Barcroft as the evil Retik, the Ruler of the Moon. The director was Fred C. Brannon, with a screenplay by Ronald Davidson, and special effects by the Lydecker brothers. This serial recycles the flying sequences from Republic's earlier 1949 serial King of the Rocket Men. It was later released by Republic in 1966 as the 100-minute television film Retik the Moon Menace.

The odd naming choice of the serial's main hero, "Commando Cody," was possibly an attempt by Republic to make young audiences think they were seeing another adventure of Commander Corry, the hero of the popular ABC TV and radio series Space Patrol (1950–1955). However, there is no surviving evidence that this was a consideration by anyone at Republic.

== Plot ==
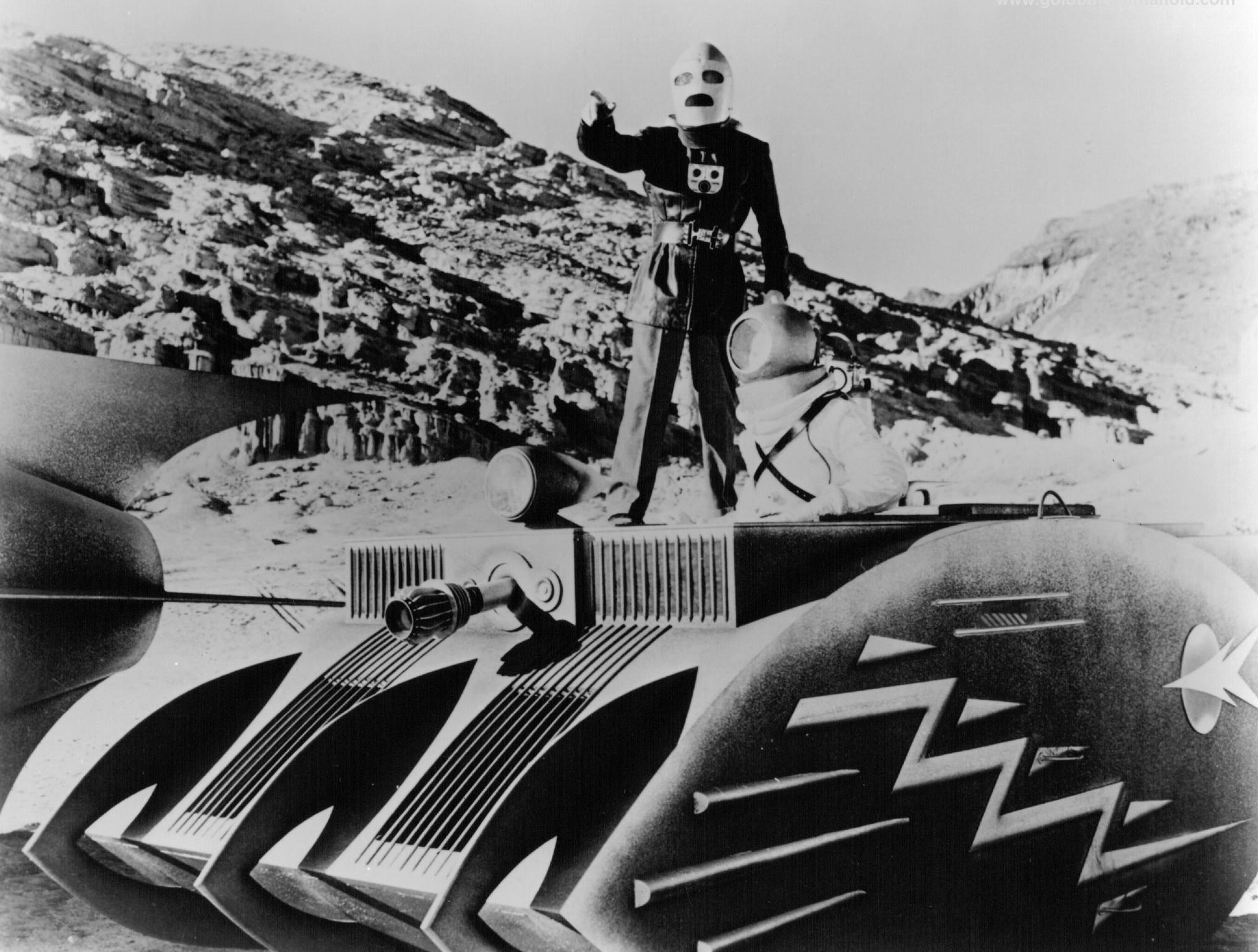
Commando Cody with lunar tank

Commando Cody (George Wallace) is a civilian researcher and inventor with a number of employees. He uses a streamlined helmet and an atomic-powered rocket backpack attached to a leather flying jacket. Cody also uses a rocket ship capable of reaching the Moon. When the U.S. finds itself under attack from a mysterious force that can wipe out entire military bases and industrial complexes, Cody surmises (correctly) that the Earth is coming under attack from our own Moon. He then flies his rocket ship there and confronts the Moon's "ruler", Retik (Roy Barcroft), who boldly announces his plans to both conquer Earth and then move the Moon's entire population here using spaceships and atomic weapons. Their weapons use an element superior to uranium which they call lunarium.

During the next 11 serial chapters, Cody, now back on Earth, and his associates Joan (Aline Towne), Ted (William Bakewell) and Dick (Gayle Kellogg) battle an elusive lunar agent named Krog (Peter Brocco) and his gang of human henchmen led by Graber (Clayton Moore) and Daly (Bob Stevenson), who use lunarium-powered ray cannons to disrupt defense forces and weaken public morale. After a second trip to the Moon, in which he captures a sample ray cannon for duplication in his lab, Cody tracks Retik's minions to their hideout where Krog is killed by one of his own devices, and Graber and Daly subsequently die in an over-the-cliff car chase. Retik flies to Earth to take personal charge of his collapsing operations but is blasted out of the sky by one of his own ray weapons.

=== Chapter titles ===
1. "Moon Rocket" (20 min)
2. "Molten Terror" (13min 20s)
3. "Bridge of Death" (13min 20s)
4. "Flight to Destruction" (13min 20s)
5. "Murder Car" (13min 20s)
6. "Hills of Death" (13min 20s)
7. "Camouflaged Destruction" (13min 20s)
8. "The Enemy Planet" (13min 20s)
9. "Battle in the Stratosphere" (13min 20s)
10. "Mass Execution" (13min 20s) - a re-cap chapter
11. "Planned Pursuit" (13min 20s)
12. "Death of the Moon Man" (13min 20s)

_{Source:}

== Cast ==
Radar Men From the Moon - Chapter 1: Moon Rocket

- George Wallace as Commando Cody
- Aline Towne as Joan Gilbert
- Roy Barcroft as Retik, Ruler of the Moon
- William Bakewell as Ted Richards
- Clayton Moore as Graber
- Peter Brocco as Krog
- Bob Stevenson as Daly
- Don Walters as Govt. Agent Henderson

== Production ==
Radar Men from the Moon was budgeted at $172,840, although the final negative cost was $185,702 (a $12,862, or 7.4%, overspend). It was the most expensive Republic serial of 1952 and was filmed between October 17 and November 6, 1951 under the working title Planet Men from Mars; the serial's production number was 1932.

The serial's budget was so tight that a stunt double was not always used for lead actor George Wallace. His nose was broken by accident while filming an energetic fight scene with actor Clayton Moore. For the camera's close-up flying sequences, Wallace was suspended in mid-air above a sound stage; he was lying on a horizontal board with the rocket suit's jacket closed around it, with a rear projection screen behind him. Wallace performed his own stunt flying take-offs by jumping onto a springboard that would send him up and over the camera rig set-up.

This serial is heavily padded with rocket-suit effects footage first filmed for the earlier King of the Rocket Men, to which some believe this was a pseudo-sequel. Despite reports that a repainted Juggernaut vehicle from Republic's much-earlier Undersea Kingdom serial is reused here as Retik's lunar tank, the tank-like Moon "Scout Car" was not used in the earlier serial. All spaceship footage was filmed new for Radar Men from the Moon. Outer space is shown as brightly lit, and the characters are shown walking on the Moon, in normal Earth gravity and in daylight, without pressure suits. The laboratory building is actually a Republic Pictures office building with a prop "Cody Laboratories" sign added to its exterior.

Two different aerodynamic helmets were used with the Commando Cody rocket backpack, with the lighter weight version being used only in the stunt sequences; the single-hinged visors of both helmets were always getting stuck open or closed.

== Releases ==
=== Theatrical ===
Radar Men from the Moon's official release date is January 9, 1952, although this is actually the date the sixth chapter was made available to U.S. film exchanges.

Republic's next new serial, Zombies of the Stratosphere, also used some of the previous Cody flying suit and spaceship film footage. It followed in the summer and began as a sequel to "Radar Men". For unspecified reasons, at the last minute, Republic changed the character names of Cody, Joan, Ted, and Bob. In between these two serials, Republic had begun filming its first attempt at a TV series, "Commando Cody: Sky Marshal of the Universe", but stopped production after completing the first three episodes to begin work on "Zombies of the Stratosphere". After that serial was completed, Republic resumed the production on nine more episodes of the Commando Cody TV series. After it was completed, Republic released it (for contractual reasons) to theaters as a traditional 12-part movie serial. It was finally syndicated to TV in 1955 as a 12-part weekly series.

In 1955, Republic's final movie serial, King of the Carnival, was released. Radar Men from the Moon was also re-released on September 30, 1957 in between Republic's re-releases of the similar Zorro's Black Whip and Son of Zorro.

=== Television ===
Radar Men from the Moon was one of 26 Republic serials syndicated in 1966 as a 100-minute TV film under their "Century 66" package marketing name. The film title used for the TV release was Retik the Moon Menace.

In 1979, Firesign Theatre used segments of this and other serials in their made-for-TV parody comedy film, J-Men Forever.

In 1989, the serial regained notoriety as the first shorts shown by the cult series Mystery Science Theater 3000. The first eight-and-a-half chapters of this Commando Cody serial were lampooned before the showing of their main feature-of-the-week (only half of the ninth installment was shown, with the in-show excuse being that "the film broke").

== Home media ==
Radar Men from the Moon has been available for decades in various home video formats, and was released on Blu-ray by Grapevine Video on October 13, 2017. Despite a well-made pasted-over main title, a feature version called Commando Cody vs. the Moon Menace, available from Alpha Video (Oldies.com), is simply an edited version of Retik the Moon Menace.

== Critical reception ==
In his 1984 book In the Nick of Time author William C. Cline dismissed the serial as a "quickie".

== Copyright ==
Because of a failure to renew copyright, Radar Men lapsed into the public domain in 1979.
