= Lost Planet Airmen =

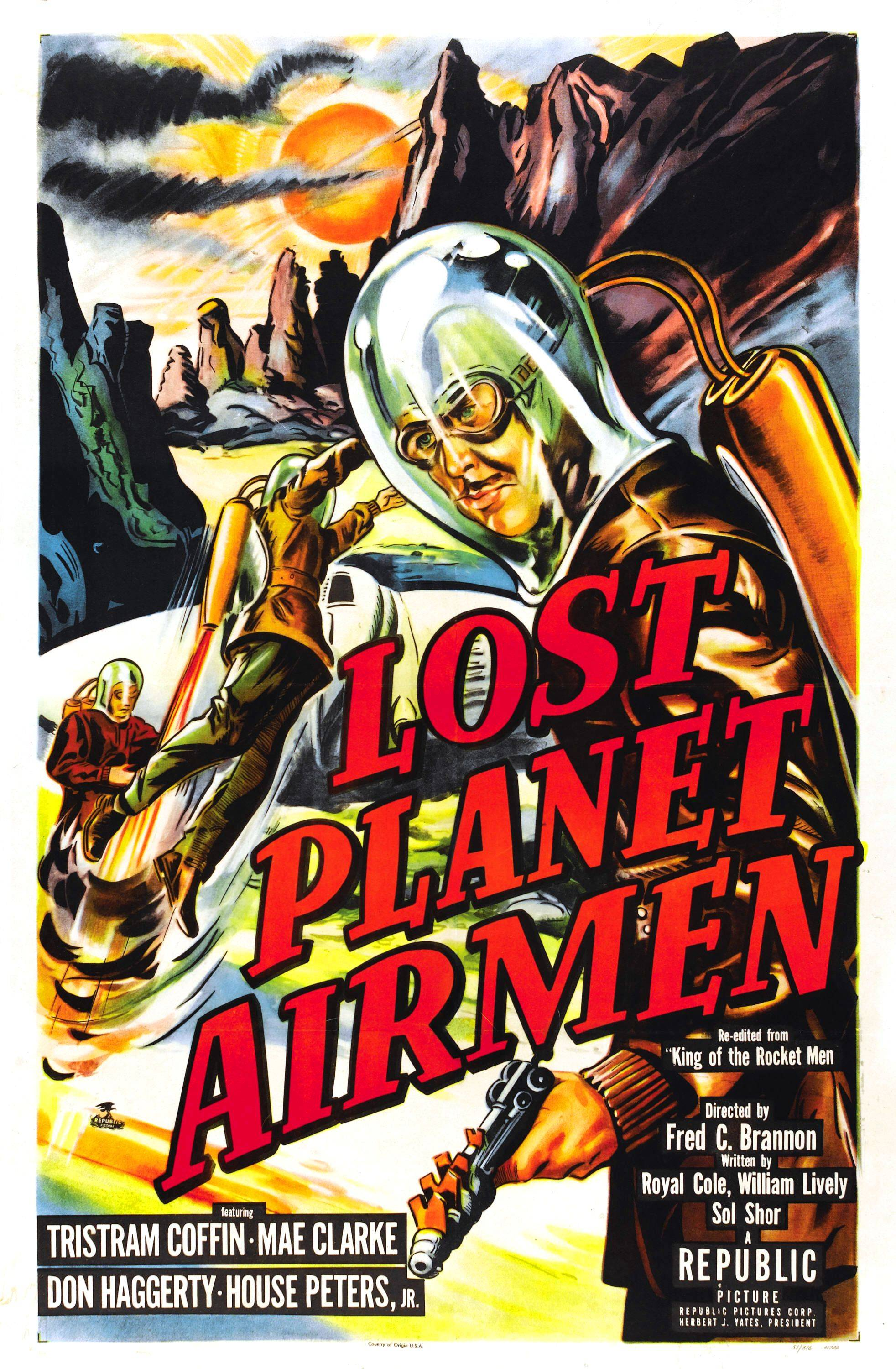
- Theatrical release poster
- Directed by: Fred C. Brannon
- Written by: Royal K. Cole; William Lively
- Produced by: Franklin Adreon
- Starring: Tristram Coffin; Mae Clarke
- Cinematography: Ellis W. Carter
- Edited by: Cliff Bell Sr. Sam Starr
- Music by: Stanley Wilson
- Production company: Republic Pictures
- Distributed by: Republic Pictures
- Release date: July 25, 1951
- Running time: 65 minutes
- Country: United States
- Language: English

Lost Planet Airmen is a 1951 black-and-white American science fiction compilation film produced and distributed by Republic Pictures, condensed from episodes of the 1949 twelve-chapter serial King of the Rocket Men. Lost Planet Airmen was directed by Fred C. Brannon and written by Royal K. Cole and William Lively. The lead actors are Tristram Coffin and Mae Clark.

== Plot ==
Professor Millard (James Craven), a scientist who is a member of the group Science Associates, works in a secluded desert location in a cave laboratory on a secret research project. Reporter and photographer Glenda Thomas (Mae Clarke) is curious about that secret project. When she tours the Science Associates building, she meets Burt Winslow (House Peters, Jr.), the project's publicity director, and Jeff King (Tristram Coffin), a research project member.

The mysterious "Dr. Vulcan" is intent on stealing the various weapons being developed by the scientists of the Science Associates group. Vulcan hopes to make a fortune by selling these valuable devices to foreign powers. Dr. Vulcan's gang kills one of the scientists. To stop Vulcan and his operatives, Jeff dons a newly developed, atomic-powered rocket backpack, mounted on a leather jacket, which has a streamlined flying helmet attached that hides his identity. With the assistance of Dr. Millard, he continually foils the attacks by Vulcan's henchmen.

Vulcan plots to destroy New York City using a sonic ray device, which will cause massive earthquakes and flooding. Only "the rocket man" ultimately stands in his way and unmasks Vulcan, exposing his real identity, while thwarting his diabolical plan of destruction.

== Cast ==
- Tristram Coffin as Jeff King aka Rocket Man
- Mae Clarke as Glenda Thomas
- Don Haggerty as Tony Dirken
- House Peters, Jr. as Burt Winslow
- James Craven as Dr. Millard
- I. Stanford Jolley as Professor Bryant
- Stanley Price as Gunther Von Strum
- Ted Adams as Martin Conway
- Marshall Bradford as Dr. Graffner
- Dale Van Sickel as Martin (archive footage)
- Tom Steele as Knox, a thug (archive footage)
- David Sharpe as Blears (archive footage)
- Eddie Parker as Rowan (archive footage)
- Michael Ferro as Turk (archive footage)
- Frank O'Connor as Warehouse Guard (archive footage)

(Note: The shadowy Dr. Vulcan is never revealed, but is heard only as a voice.)

== Production ==
Lost Planet Airmen used scenes from King of the Rocket Men, which had been more cheaply made than previous Republic serials. Creating a compilation feature film allowed Republic to have another opportunity to exploit the serial for further profit; the studio's prospects of continuing multi-chapter serials in a waning market was not lost on management. Republic and Columbia Pictures were the last two film studios to offer serials in the mid-1950s. In 1956 Columbia offered only two 15-episode serials; that was the end the cycle.

This was one of 14 feature films Republic made from their serials. The title was changed to Lost Planet Airmen after using the working titles The Lost Planet and Lost Planetmen. The ending was changed for this feature version. Instead of New York City being reduced to rubble by a deluge, as in the serial, those events are dismissed as just the "dream of a mad man" and did not really happen. (A similar change was made in the feature version of Drums of Fu Manchu.)

=== Stunts ===
- David Sharpe as Jeff King/Tony Dirken/Prof Bryant (doubling Tristram Coffin in rocket suit, Don Haggerty & I. Stanford Jolley)
- Tom Steele as Jeff King/Burt Winslow (doubling Tristram Coffin and House Peters, Jr.)
- Dale Van Sickel as Jeff King/Tony Dirken (doubling Tristram Coffin in the helmet/rocket backpack and Don Haggerty)
- Carey Loftin as Burt Winslow (doubling House Peters Jr)
- Eddie Parker
- Bud Wolfe

== Receptions ==
Jim Craddock, in VideoHound's Golden Movie Retriever 2001 included a slight mention of the "feature-length condensation of Republic's 12-part science fiction serial, King of the Rocket Man." He further noted (incorrectly) that, "Rocket man is pitted against the sinister Dr. Vulcan in this intergalactic (sic) battle of good and evil".
