= Johnny Spencer =

American baseball player

- Outfielder
- Born: October 30, 1897; Lynchburg, Virginia, U.S.
- Died: January 22, 1984 (aged 86); Schenectady, New York, U.S.
- Batted: Left Threw: Left

Negro league baseball debut
- 1921, for the Homestead Grays

Last appearance
- 1922, for the Pittsburgh Keystones

Teams
- Homestead Grays (1921); Pittsburgh Keystones (1921–1922)

John William Spencer (October 30, 1897 – January 22, 1984) was an American Negro league outfielder in 1921 and 1922.

A native of Lynchburg, Virginia, Spencer played for the Homestead Grays and Pittsburgh Keystones in 1921, and returned to Pittsburgh to finish his career in 1922. He died in Schenectady, New York in 1984 at age 86.
