= James Craven (American actor) =

Canadian-American actor (c.1902–1991)

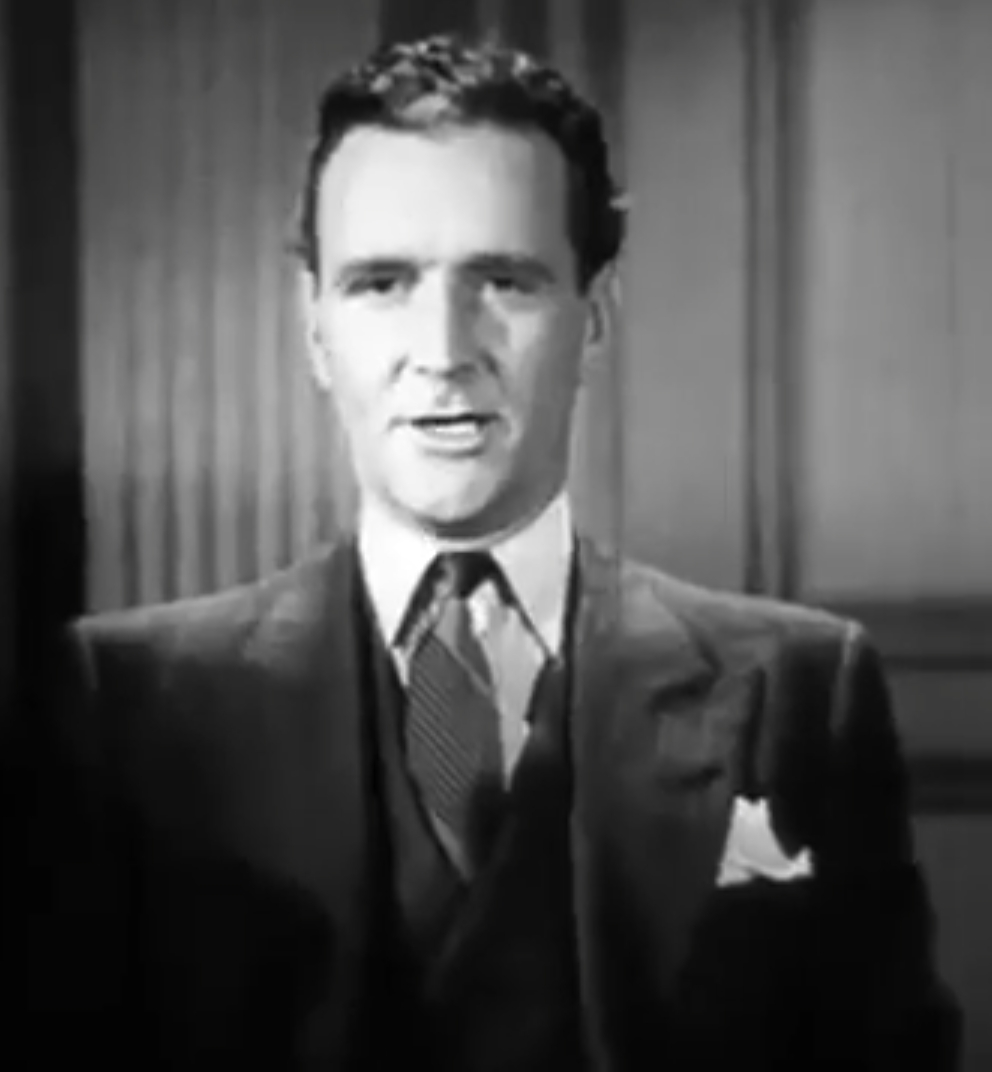
- Craven in Today I Hang (1942)
- Born: c. 1902; Malone, New York, U.S.
- Died: 1991; Montreal, Canada
- Occupation: Actor
- Years active: 1940–1956

James Craven (born Titus Benjamin Meigs in Malone, New York; c. 1902–1991) was a Canadian-American actor. He played a wide variety of roles and has a minimum of 98 film and television credits including the TV show The Adventures of Kit Carson, as well as the classic motion picture Johnny Belinda and the popular movie serials The Green Archer, Captain Midnight, and King of the Rocket Men.

Craven's own professional resumé does not include the year or place of his birth. Serial historian Daniel J. Neyer has determined that Craven "made frequent transatlantic crossings from the year of his birth up to 1923. He is identified as a 'Canadian actor' in a 1935 London marriage notice, and only became a naturalized American citizen in 1943." Throughout the 1930s he performed on Canadian and British stages.

Craven arrived in Hollywood in 1939 and was signed by Columbia Pictures. Producer Larry Darmour cast him in the 1940 serial The Green Archer. Director James W. Horne was fond of having his performers play the action straight for the first three chapters -- these were the sample episodes that would be shown to attract sales -- and then exaggerate their portrayals for comic effect in the later chapters. Craven took full advantage of Horne's direction. His suave, gentleman-thief character gradually became "a sputtering, impatient, and hilariously unhinged figure as his intricate plans were repeatedly foiled. Author Scott MacGillivray aptly described him as 'the Wile E. Coyote of serial villains: he expects his henchmen to fail.'"

Craven continued playing seriocomic villains for Horne in White Eagle (1941) and Captain Midnight (1942). After Horne died in 1942, Columbia's serial unit was suspended temporarily and Craven found employment at other studios, usually playing upright military officers. He returned to serials in 1945, now for Republic Pictures: The Purple Monster Strikes (1945), Federal Agents vs. Underworld Inc. (1948), King of the Rocket Men (1949), and Flying Disc Man from Mars (1950)."

He continued to play character roles in films and television into the 1950s. His last screen credit was Death of a Scoundrel (1956).

Again quoting historian Neyer: "Craven married Blanche Leining in 1963, and the couple briefly moved to California, but by 1966 they were living in Old Lyme, Connecticut, where they resided until at least the early 1970s. Craven ultimately moved back to Canada, and passed away in the Montreal area in 1991."

== Partial filmography ==
- The Green Archer (1940, serial)
- Tumbledown Ranch in Arizona (1941)
- Little Joe, the Wrangler (1941)
- White Eagle (1941, serial)
- A Yank in the R.A.F. (1941)
- Captain Midnight (1942, serial)
- Today I Hang (1942)
- Immortal Sergeant (1943)
- The Purple Monster Strikes (1945, serial)
- Days of Buffalo Bill (1946)
- Murder in the Music Hall (1946)
- Sheriff of Redwood Valley (1946)
- Desperadoes of Dodge City (1948)
- Million Dollar Weekend (1948)
- Johnny Belinda (1948)
- Federal Agents vs. Underworld Inc. (1948, serial)
- The Clay Pigeon (1949)
- King of the Rocket Men (1949, serial)
- Flying Disc Man from Mars (1950, serial)
- Trial Without Jury (1950)
- Wells Fargo Gunmaster (1951)
- The Adventures of Kit Carson (1951, TV series)
- Against All Flags (1952)
- Adventures of Superman (1953, TV series, 1 episode)
- Blades of the Musketeers (1953)
- East of Sumatra (1953)
- Death of a Scoundrel (1956)
