= Judd Holdren =

American actor (1915–1974)

- Holdren in 1950
- Born: October 16, 1915; Villisca, Iowa, U.S.
- Died: March 11, 1974 (aged 58); Los Angeles, California, U.S.
- Resting place: Valhalla Memorial Park
- Years active: 1949-1963

Judd Clifton Holdren (October 16, 1915 – March 11, 1974) was an American film actor who starred in science fiction movies. He was best known for his starring roles in the serials Captain Video: Master of the Stratosphere (1951), Zombies of the Stratosphere (1952), The Lost Planet (1953), and the semi-serial Commando Cody: Sky Marshal of the Universe (1953). He committed suicide in 1974.

== Early life ==
He was born near Villisca, Iowa, the fifth of 10 children in a farming family, and showed early interest in an acting career. He dropped out of high school to travel to Omaha, Nebraska, where he gained experience at the Omaha Playhouse.

During World War II, he served in the United States Coast Guard on the USS General H. B. Freeman (AP-143), then moved to Hollywood. While in the Coast Guard, he rose to the rank of commander. His first regular employment there was as a male model.

== Career ==
Most of his early film parts were uncredited bits, including All the King's Men (1949) and Francis the Talking Mule (1950).

Holdren soon won lead roles in the war comedy Purple Heart Diary (1951) co-starring Frances Langford, as well as Captain Video: Master of the Stratosphere (1951) the serial version of the adventures of Captain Video, becoming the third actor (after Richard Coogan and Al Hodge) to assume the role of the heroic Captain. Holdren portrayed Aramis in the Three Musketeers adventure film Lady in the Iron Mask (1952) starring Louis Hayward as D'Artagnan and Patricia Medina in the titular role. After The Lost Planet (1953), Holdren tried to maintain a foothold in feature films and TV, but with limited success.

He appeared in a number of ongoing TV series, such as Dragnet and The Lone Ranger, but usually in bit parts, often uncredited. His last significant film appearances were in very minor roles in feature films like Jeanne Eagels (1957), Ice Palace (1960), and The Rise and Fall of Legs Diamond (1960). The rapidity of his descent is indicated by the fact that in Commando Cody: Sky Marshal of the Universe (1953) he plays the lead role and Richard Crane plays his (semi-comical) sidekick, whereas in the TV series Rocky Jones Space Ranger (1953–54) Richard Crane plays the lead role and Holdren has a walk-on part in two episodes as "Ranger Higgins".

After 1960, Holdren became a full-time insurance salesman. During his Hollywood years, he was seen in public as the escort of many different Hollywood beauties, but he never married.

== Death ==
Holdren committed suicide on March 11, 1974, by a gunshot to the head.

He is buried at Valhalla Memorial Park in North Hollywood.

== Filmography ==
Year	Title	Role	Notes
1949	All the King's Men	Politician	Uncredited
1950	Francis	First Ambulance Man	Uncredited
1950	Rocketship X-M	Reporter #3	Uncredited
1950	Lonely Heart Bandits	Trooper	Uncredited
1950	Frisco Tornado	Henchman	Uncredited
1950	Revenue Agent	Squad Car Officer	Uncredited
1950	Mystery Submarine	Wireless Operator	Uncredited
1951	The Lady Pays Off	Face	
1951	Purple Heart Diary	Lt. Mike McCormick	
1951	Captain Video: Master of the Stratosphere	Captain Video	Serial
1952	Gold Fever	Jud Jerson	
1952	Lady in the Iron Mask	Aramis	
1952	Zombies of the Stratosphere	Larry Martin	
1953	The Lost Planet	Rex Barrow	Serial
1953	Commando Cody: Sky Marshal of the Universe	Commando Cody	Serial
1954	This Is My Love	Doctor Raines	
1957	Spoilers of the Forest	Mr. Peyton	Uncredited
1957	Jeanne Eagels	Young Actor on Equity Board	Uncredited
1957	The Amazing Colossal Man	Robert Allen	Uncredited
1958	Space Master X-7	First Officer Jared	Uncredited
1958	The Buccaneer	Maj. Reed	
1958	The Power of the Resurrection	Temple Officer	
1959	The FBI Story	Party Guest	Uncredited
1960	Ice Palace	Muriel's Escort	Uncredited
1960	The Rise and Fall of Legs Diamond	Haberdashery Clerk	Uncredited
1963	Critic's Choice	2nd Opponent	Uncredited, (final film role)
