= King of the Rocket Men =

1949 film by Fred C. Brannon

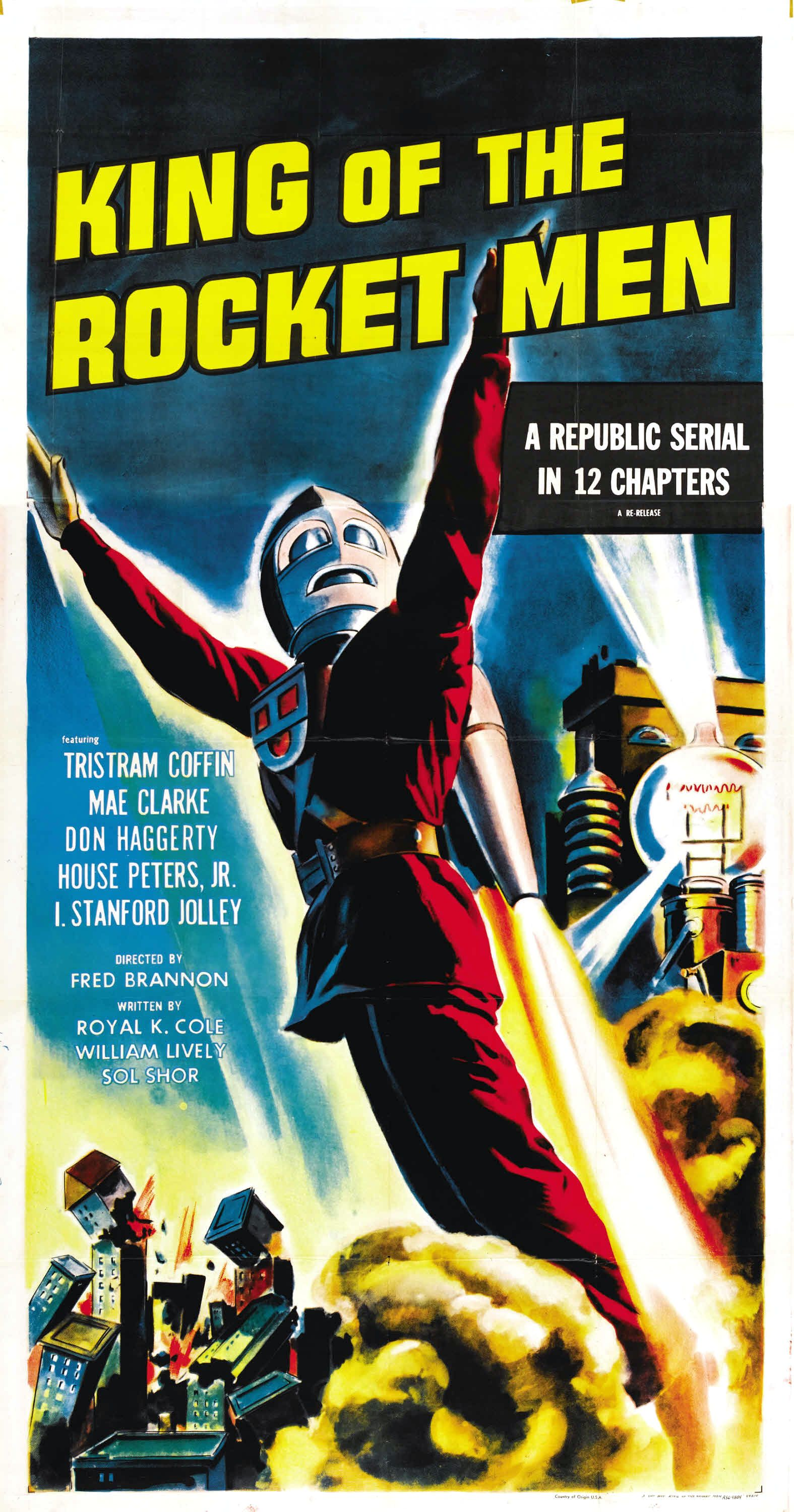
- Theatrical release insert poster
- Directed by: Fred C. Brannon
- Written by: Royal Cole; William Lively; Sol Shor
- Produced by: Franklin Adreon
- Starring: Tristram Coffin; Mae Clarke; Don Haggerty; House Peters, Jr. James Craven; I. Stanford Jolley
- Cinematography: Ellis W. Carter
- Edited by: Cliff Bell, Sr. Sam Starr
- Music by: Stanley Wilson
- Distributed by: Republic Pictures
- Release dates: June 8, 1949 (U.S. serial); July 25, 1951 (U.S. feature); July 16, 1956 (U.S. re-release)
- Running time: 12 chapters (167 minutes) (serial); 65 minutes (feature)
- Country: United States
- Budget: $164,984 (negative cost: $165,592)

King of the Rocket Men is a 1949 12-chapter movie serial from Republic Pictures, produced by Franklin Adreon, directed Fred C. Brannon, that stars Tristram Coffin, Mae Clarke, Don Haggerty, House Peters, Jr., James Craven, and I. Stanford Jolley.

This movie serial is notable for featuring the only character actually called "Rocket Man", a nickname applied by fans to the other Republic rocket-powered heroes that followed in their later serials: Radar Men from the Moon (1952), Zombies of the Stratosphere (1952), and Commando Cody: Sky Marshal of the Universe (1953).

== Plot ==
An evil genius of unknown identity, calling himself "Dr. Vulcan" (heard only as a voice and seen as a mysterious shadow on a brightly lit wall), plots to conquer the world. He needs to first eliminate, one by one, the members of the Science Associates, an organization of America's greatest scientists.

After narrowly escaping an attempt on his life by Vulcan, one member of Science Associates, Dr. Millard (James Craven) goes into hiding. He soon outfits another member, Jeff King (Tristram Coffin) with an advanced, atomic-powered rocket backpack, attached to a leather jacket with a bullet-shaped, aerodynamic flight helmet, and a raygun that they had been developing together.

Using the flying jacket, helmet and other inventions provided by Dr. Millard, and aided by magazine reporter and photographer Glenda Thomas (Mae Clarke), Jeff King, as Rocket Man, battles Vulcan and his henchmen through a dozen action-packed Republic serial chapters. Eventually, Vulcan steals Millard's most dangerous invention, a Sonic Decimator, and uses it to flood, then destroy New York City. The mysterious Dr. Vulcan is eventually unmasked and brought to justice by Jeff King while in his Rocket Man persona.

== Chapter titles ==
1. "Dr. Vulcan – Traitor" (20min)
2. "Plunging Death" (13min 20s)
3. "Dangerous Evidence" (13min 20s)
4. "High Peril" (13min 20s)
5. "Fatal Dive" (13min 20s)
6. "Mystery of the Rocket Man" (13min 20s)
7. "Molten Menace" (13min 20s)
8. "Suicide Flight" (13min 20s)
9. "Ten Seconds to Live" (13min 20s)
10. "The Deadly Fog" (13min 20s), a re-cap chapter
11. "Secret of Dr. Vulcan" (13min 20s)
12. "Wave of Disaster" (13min 20s)

_{Source:}

== Cast ==
- Tristram Coffin as Jeff King aka Rocket Man
- Mae Clarke as Glenda Thomas
- Don Haggerty as Tony Dirken
- House Peters, Jr. as Burt Winslow
- James Craven as Dr. Millard
- I. Stanford Jolley as Professor Bryant/Dr. Vulcan
- Stanley Price as Gunther Von Strum
- Ted Adams as Martin Conway
- Marshall Bradford as Dr. Graffner

== Production ==
Kirk Alyn was considered for the lead as Jeff King/Rocket Man, but the part eventually went to Coffin.

King of the Rocket Men was budgeted at $164,984, although the final negative cost was $165,592 (a $608, or 0.4%, overspend); it was the most expensive Republic serial of 1949. The serial, Republic production number 1704, was filmed between April 6 and 27, 1949.

The main character in this serial is Jeff King, otherwise known as Rocket Man. His flight sequences were inspired by the Buck Rogers comic strip. (Note: Republic liked naming their heroes "King" to use the title "King of ..." The studio had found success with this naming scheme following the adaptation of Zane Grey's King of the Royal Mounted.)

Two streamlined, bullet-shaped prop helmets were used with the sonic-powered, rocket-equipped backpack attached to a leather flying jacket. The first was made of lighter-weight materials and worn only during the various stunt action scenes; during filming, the single-hinged visors on both helmets frequently warped and would stick open or closed.

King of the Rocket Men lacks a colorful costumed villain along the lines of Republic's earlier serials Adventures of Captain Marvel and The Crimson Ghost. The final chapter's flooding and destruction footage had previously been used by the studio as the centerpiece for 1941's Dick Tracy vs. Crime, Inc..

=== Stunts ===
- David Sharpe as Jeff King/Tony Dirken/Prof Bryant (doubling Tristram Coffin in rocket suit, Don Haggerty & I. Stanford Jolley)
- Tom Steele as Jeff King/Burt Winslow (doubling Tristram Coffin and House Peters, Jr.)
- Dale Van Sickel as Jeff King/Tony Dirken (doubling Tristram Coffin in the helmet/rocket backpack and Don Haggerty)
- Carey Loftin as Burt Winslow (doubling House Peters Jr)
- Eddie Parker
- Bud Wolfe

Rocket Man in action was played by three different Republic stuntmen. Dave Sharpe performed the leaps into the air and the acrobatics necessary to simulate flight. Tom Steele was the second stuntman in the rocket pack and helmet, and Dale Van Sickel took the role when Steele and Sharpe were unavailable or were being used in the same stunt shot. The first appearance of Rocket Man (Dave Sharpe) has him flying directly into the back of a fast-moving, tarp-covered truck, driven by stuntman Tom Steele, then getting into a fist-fight with Vulcan's henchmen; in that same fight sequence Tom Steele is also the stuntman in the Rocket Man costume.

=== Special effects ===
Several shots in the serial feature the Rocket Man character flying across broad vistas of barren landscape, an effect achieved by Howard and Theodore Lydecker running a full-sized dummy on internal pulleys along a very long, taut wire tilted at a downward angle to the horizontal. The same strategy had produced remarkable flying sequences in the earlier Republic serial Adventures of Captain Marvel (1941). Dave Sharpe's take-offs were accomplished with concealed springboards, and his landings by simply jumping down from some raised position into the film frame.

The shots of King as Rocket Man taking off, flying, and landing were reused in three subsequent Republic productions featuring flying heroes: Radar Men from the Moon (1952), Zombies of the Stratosphere (1952), and Commando Cody: Sky Marshal of the Universe (1953). Rocket Man's raygun "appeared to be a German Luger (acceptable in this post-wartime serial) with a silvery cone propped over the barrel".

The tidal wave in the serial's final chapter is actually stock footage taken from RKO's once-thought-lost science fiction feature film, Deluge (1933). Stock footage was being used for most of the chapters' cliffhanger endings, showing the "downward trend of late 1940s Republic serials".

== Release ==
=== Theatrical ===
King of the Rocket Men's official release date was June 8, 1949, although this was actually the date the sixth chapter was made available to film exchanges.

A 65-minute feature film version, created by editing the serial footage together, was released on July 25, 1951; it was one of 14 feature films Republic made from their serials. The title was changed to Lost Planet Airmen after using the working titles The Lost Planet and Lost Planetmen. The ending was changed for the feature version. Instead of New York City being reduced to rubble by a deluge, as in the serial, those events are dismissed as just the "dream of a mad man" and did not really happen. (A similar change was made in the feature version of Drums of Fu Manchu.)

King of the Rocket Men was re-released on July 16, 1956 between the similar re-releases of Adventures of Frank and Jesse James and Federal Operator 99. The last original Republic serial release was King of the Carnival in 1955.

== Critical reception ==
Film historian William C. Cline describes this serial as "one of Republic's last cliff-hangers with any originality to it". He singles out Clarke's performance, noting she is "a refreshing note in an otherwise routine proceeding".

== In popular culture ==
Two chapters were referenced in the movie Misery (1990). The character Annie Wilkes describes how the cliffhanger at the end of one chapter of Rocket Man, as she called it, was not properly resolved in the next chapter.

== See also ==
- Commander Cody and His Lost Planet Airmen
- List of film serials by year
- List of film serials by studio
- The Rocketeer (character)

Preceded by Ghost of Zorro (1949)	Republic Serial; King of the Rocket Men (1949)	Succeeded by The James Brothers of Missouri (1949)
