= The Great Adventures of Captain Kidd =

1953 film by Derwin Abrahams

- Directed by: Derwin Abrahams; Charles S. Gould
- Written by: George H. Plympton; Arthur Hoerl (story and screenplay)
- Produced by: Sam Katzman
- Starring: Richard Crane; David Bruce; John Crawford; George Wallace
- Cinematography: William P. Whitley
- Edited by: Earl Turner
- Music by: Mischa Bakaleinikoff
- Color process: Black and white
- Distributed by: Columbia Pictures
- Release date: January 1, 1953
- Running time: 15 Episodes, 97 minutes
- Country: United States
- Language: English

The Great Adventures of Captain Kidd (1953) was the 52nd serial released by Columbia Pictures. It is based in the historical figure of Captain William Kidd.

== Plot ==
In 1697, agents Richard Dale and Alan Duncan are sent on an undercover mission by the British Fleet to find and gather information on the notorious pirate, Captain William Kidd. Dale and Duncan soon join Kidd's crew and discover, to their surprise, that the Captain is quite different from what they had expected.

== Cast ==
- Richard Crane as Richard Dale
- David Bruce as Alan Duncan
- John Crawford as Capt. Kidd (Crawford was equally proficient at playing both good and bad characters. His casting added to ambiguity over Captain Kidd's guilt or innocence.)
- George Wallace as Buller
- Lee Roberts as DeVry
- Paul Newlan as Long Ben Avery
- Nick Stuart as Dr. Brandt
- Terry Frost as Moore
- John Hart as Jenkins
- Marshall Reed as Capt. Culliford
- Eduardo Cansino Jr. as Native

== Production ==
This was the last costume serial and possibly the most faithful of the rare serial entries in the swashbuckling genre since Pirate Treasure.

The plot was based on the possibility that the real Captain Kidd was misjudged in an unfair trial.

Stock footage from feature films allowed the inclusion of seafaring scenes, which would have been too expensive to film on a serial budget. This resulted in, according to Cline, "a unique flavour for which it is fondly remembered."

== Chapter titles ==
1. Pirate vs. Man-of-War
2. The Fatal Shot
3. Attacked by Captain Kidd
4. Captured by Captain Kidd
5. Mutiny on the Adventure's Galley
6. Murder on the Main Deck
7. Prisoners of War
8. Mutiny Unmasked
9. Pirate Against Pirate
10. Shot from the Parapet
11. The Flaming Fortress
12. Before the Firing Squad
13. In the Hands of the Mohawks
14. Pirate Gold
15. Captain Kidd's Last Chance

_{Source:}

== Sources ==
- Cinefania.com
