= George D. Wallace =

American actor (1917–2005)

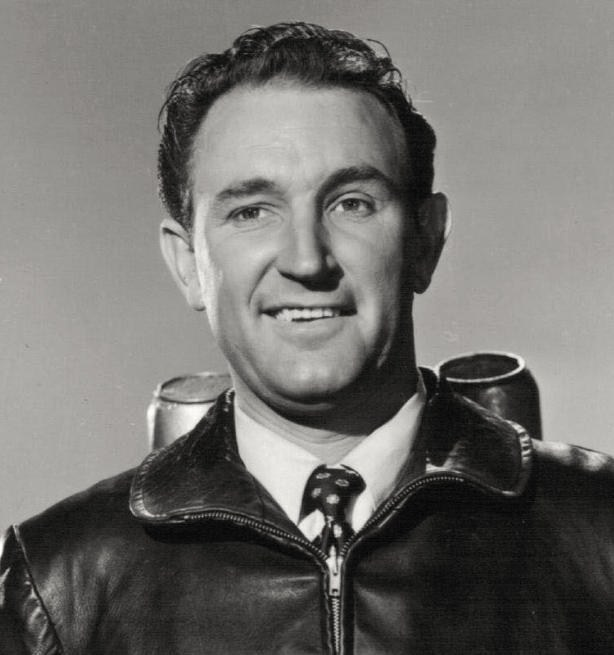
- George Wallace in Radar Men from the Moon, 1952
- Born: George Dewey Wallace; June 8, 1917; New York City, U.S.
- Died: July 22, 2005 (aged 88); Los Angeles, California, U.S.
- Resting place: Hollywood Forever Cemetery
- Occupation: Actor
- Years active: 1950–2004
- Spouse: Jane A. Johnston (m. 1964)

George Dewey Wallace (June 8, 1917 – July 22, 2005) was an American stage and screen actor. Wallace co-starred with Mary Martin in the Broadway musical Jennie and was nominated for a New York Drama Critics' Circle Award for playing the male lead in New Girl in Town opposite Gwen Verdon. He is also remembered for playing Commando Cody in the movie serial Radar Men from the Moon.

== Early years ==
Wallace was born in New York City. When he was 13 his family moved to McMechen, West Virginia. While still in his teens Wallace worked as a coal miner and joined the Civilian Conservation Corps after it was created during the Great Depression.

He joined the United States Navy in 1936 and served for eight years through World War II. Wallace served in the U.S. Pacific Fleet, where he earned the title of light heavyweight champion.

== Career ==
=== Films ===
After leaving the navy, Wallace worked as a bartender in Hollywood, California. One night gossip columnist Jimmie Fidler was in the bar and heard Wallace singing along with the jukebox for tips. Fidler was impressed with Wallace's voice and introduced him to some contacts at the film studios.

In 1952 Wallace auditioned for a character part in Radar Men from the Moon and landed the starring role of Commando Cody. To play Cody, Wallace's outfit consisted of a leather jacket, a silver bullet-shaped helmet, and an atomic-powered rocket pack controlled by three dials: up/down, fast/slow and on/off. Wallace appeared to fly in the serial by lying face-down on a long two-by-four that stuck out horizontally from a platform in front of a rear-projection screen.

In 1991, he appeared in the TV film The Boys, followed by Minority Report in 2002.

=== Television ===
In 1956, he portrayed “Dolph Timble” in James Arness's TV Western Series Gunsmoke in the episode “Hack Prine” (S1E26). In 1960 he appeared as Andy Moon in the TV western The Rifleman in the episode "Sins of the Father." In 1961 Wallace appeared as Clyde Morton in the TV western Lawman in the episode titled "Hassayampa." In Rawhide (1961) – Colonel Somers in S3:E15, "Incident of the Fish Out of Water". In 1963 Wallace appeared as Dixon on The Virginian in the episode titled "The Mountain of the Sun.", plus he was back on Gunsmoke as outlaw & gambler Ham Tobin in the episode “Easy Come” (S9E5). In 1966 he appeared as Stacey Fielding in the Perry Mason episode "The Case of the Vanishing Victim". In 1967 he appeared as Deputy Otto McAdoo on the TV western The Big Valley in the episode titled "Days of Grace." One of his last roles was an appearance in an episode of the CBS sitcom The King of Queens in 2003.

=== Stage ===
In 1955, on the set of Forbidden Planet, Walter Pidgeon introduced him to Richard Rodgers.

Wallace's Broadway debut was in the Rodgers and Hammerstein musical Pipe Dream, starring the operatic soprano Helen Traubel.

Wallace's next break on Broadway came when he was chosen to replace John Raitt in The Pajama Game when Raitt left the cast to co-star in the film version of the musical. He starred opposite Mary Martin in the 1963 flop Jennie.

While appearing in The Most Happy Fella at the Long Beach Community Music Theatre (a theatre company competing with Long Beach Civic Light Opera) in 1963, Wallace met Jane A. Johnston, whom he later married. The couple later appeared together in road company productions of Company, Kiss Me, Kate, and Funny Girl.

== Death ==
Wallace died at Cedars-Sinai Medical Center in Los Angeles from injuries he sustained during a fall while on vacation in Pisa, Italy.

He was interred at Hollywood Forever Cemetery.

== Selected filmography ==
- The Sun Sets at Dawn (1950) - Prison Guard (uncredited)
- Up Front (1951) - MP (uncredited)
- The Fat Man (1951) - Carl (uncredited)
- Inside the Walls of Folsom Prison (1951) - Cellblock Convict (uncredited)
- Submarine Command (1951) - Chief Herb Bixby
- Man in the Saddle (1951) - Rider (uncredited)
- The Lady Says No (1951) - Police Officer (uncredited)
- Radar Men from the Moon (1952) - Commando Cody
- Japanese War Bride (1952) - Woody Blacker
- Meet Danny Wilson (1952) - Patrolman (uncredited)
- Sally and Saint Anne (1952) - Jimmy Mulvaney (uncredited)
- We're Not Married! (1952) - Shore Patrolman (uncredited)
- The Big Sky (1952) - Thug in General Store (uncredited)
- Back at the Front (1952) - Military Policeman (uncredited)
- Kansas City Confidential (1952) - Olson (uncredited)
- Million Dollar Mermaid (1952) - Bud Williams - Stunt Pilot (uncredited)
- The Lawless Breed (1953) - Brady (uncredited)
- Star of Texas (1953) - Clampett
- The Homesteaders (1953) - Meade
- The Lone Hand (1953) - Pinkerton Man (uncredited)
- Francis Covers the Big Town (1953) - Mounted Traffic Cop (uncredited)
- Arena (1953) - Buster Cole
- The Great Adventures of Captain Kidd (1953) - Buller
- Vigilante Terror (1953) - Brewer
- The French Line (1953) - Cowboy (uncredited)
- Border River (1954) - Fletcher
- Drums Across the River (1954) - Les Walker
- The Human Jungle (1954) - Det. O'Neill
- Destry (1954) - Curly
- Man Without a Star (1955) - Tom Carter
- Rage at Dawn (1955) - Sheriff Mosley (uncredited)
- Strange Lady in Town (1955) - Curley (uncredited)
- Soldier of Fortune (1955) - Gunner (uncredited)
- The Night of the Hunter (1955) - (uncredited)
- The Second Greatest Sex (1955) - Simon Clegghorn
- Slightly Scarlet (1956) - Thug (uncredited)
- Forbidden Planet (1956) - Bosun
- Star in the Dust (1956) - Joe (uncredited)
- Great Day in the Morning (1956) - Jack Lawford (uncredited)
- Six Black Horses (1962) - Will Boone
- Dead Heat on a Merry-Go-Round (1966) - Police chief Captain Yates (uncredited)
- Texas Across the River (1966) - Willet
- Caprice (1967) - Policeman (uncredited)
- Skin Game (1971) - Auctioneer
- The Swinging Cheerleaders (1974) - Mr. Putnam
- The Towering Inferno (1974) - Chief Officer
- Lifeguard (1976) - Mr. Carlson
- Billy Jack Goes to Washington (1977) - Senator Burton
- The Private Files of J. Edgar Hoover (1977) - Senator Joseph McCarthy
- The Stunt Man (1980) - Father
- Protocol (1984) - T. V. Commentator
- Just Between Friends (1986) - Bob Chadwick
- Native Son (1986) - Judge
- Prison (1987) - Joe Reese
- Hot to Trot (1988) - Orson
- Punchline (1988) - Doctor Wishniak
- Postcards from the Edge (1990) - Carl
- Defending Your Life (1991) - Daniel's Judge
- The Boys (1991, TV Movie) - Ray
- Diggstown (1992) - Bob Ferris
- My Girl 2 (1994) - Gnarly Old Man
- Almost Dead (1994) - Caretaker
- Multiplicity (1996) - Man in Restaurant
- Forces of Nature (1999) - Max
- Bicentennial Man (1999) - Male President
- Deal of a Lifetime (1999) - Coach Millhaven
- Nurse Betty (2000) - Grandfather
- Minority Report (2002) - Chief Justice Pollard
