= Aline Towne =

American actress

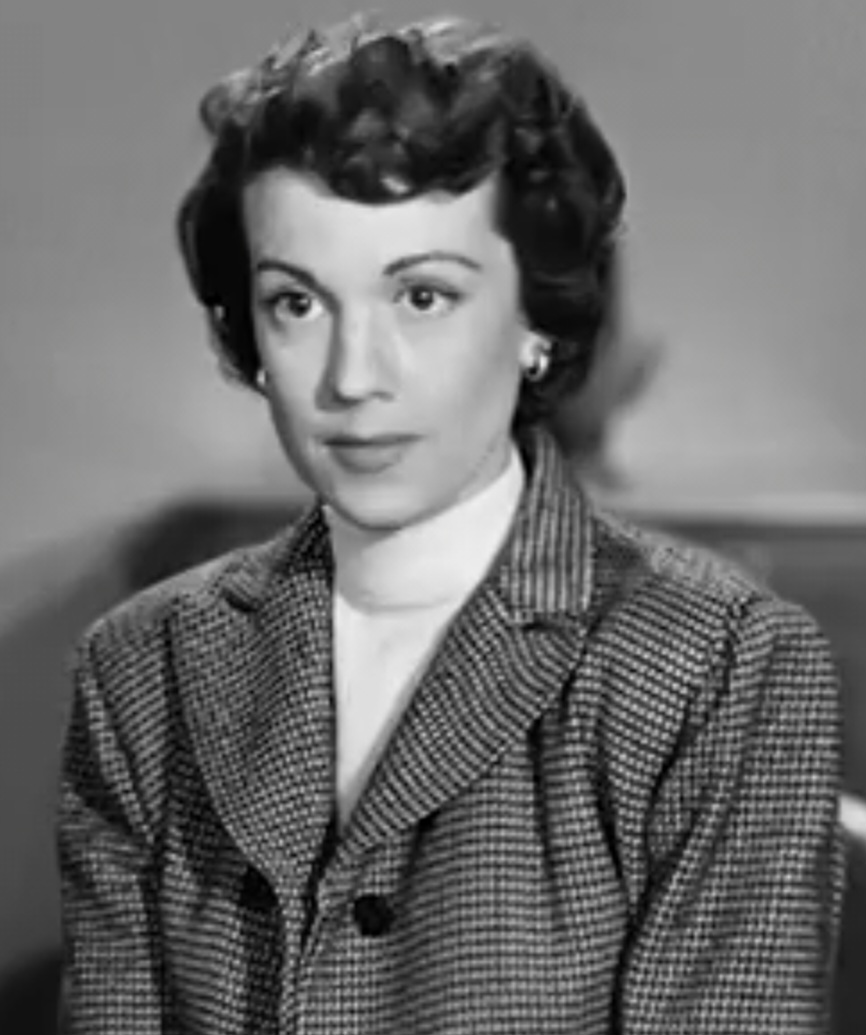
- Towne in an episode of The Public Defender (1955)
- Born: Fern Aline Eggen; November 7, 1919; St. Paul, Minnesota, U.S.
- Died: February 2, 1996 (aged 76); Burbank, California, U.S.
- Other names: Fern Aline Waller, Fern Eggen
- Education: University of Iowa
- Occupations: Film, television actress
- Years active: 1950-1985
- Spouse: Charles W Waller (1946-1986) (his death) (3 children)

Fern Aline Waller (née Eggen; 7 November 1919 – 2 February 1996), known as Aline Towne, was an American film and television actress, best remembered for her lead roles in 1950s Republic serials, such as Radar Men from the Moon.

== Early life and career ==
Born Fern Aline Eggen in St. Paul, Minnesota and raised in Charles City, Iowa, Towne was the daughter of Gertrude N. Jennings and Norwegian American design engineer Oscar Edward Eggen. She attended the University of Iowa, becoming a member of the Kappa Kappa Gamma sorority and graduating with a Bachelor of Arts in 1942.

Towne was a Powers model.

Towne appeared in dozens of roles on television, in series such as Lassie, Leave It to Beaver, Sea Hunt, Wagon Train, Maverick, The Lone Ranger, Tales of Wells Fargo, and The Donna Reed Show. In 1952 she played Lara, Superman's mother in the first episode of the Adventures of Superman. She also had a small speaking role (billed as Fern Eggen) in White Heat (1949).

== Personal life and death ==
Towne was married to Bill Waller.

She died in Burbank, California in 1996.

== Filmography ==
Year	Title	Role	Notes
1950	A Woman of Distinction	Young Lady	Uncredited
1950	Harbor of Missing Men	Angelique Corcoris	
1950	The Vanishing Westerner	Barbara	
1950	The Invisible Monster	Carol Richards	Serial
1950	Highway 301	Madeline Welton	
1951	Rough Riders of Durango	Janis Adams	
1951	I Can Get It for You Wholesale	Model	Uncredited
1951	Don Daredevil Rides Again	Patricia Doyle	Serial
1951	Purple Heart Diary	Lt. Cathy Dietrich	
1952	Radar Men from the Moon	Joan Gilbert	Serial
1952	Confidence Girl	Peggy Speel	
1952	Zombies of the Stratosphere	Sue Davis	Serial
1952	The Steel Trap	Gail Woodley	
1953	A Blueprint for Murder	Hospital File Clerk	Uncredited
1954	Trader Tom of the China Seas	Vivian Wells	Serial
1954	Gog	Dr. Kirby	Uncredited
1955	The Lone Ranger	Wife of Ben Talbot	Serial
1956	Julie	Denise Martin	
1957	Man Afraid	Mrs. Wilbur Fletcher	Uncredited
1958	Maverick	Laura Miller	Trail West to Fury
1958	Tales of Wells Fargo	Nell Forrester	“Billy the Kid” S1 E21
1964	The Brass Bottle	Miss Glidden	
1964	Bullet for a Badman	Saloon Girl	Uncredited
1964	Send Me No Flowers	Cora	
1964	Taggart	Kate	Uncredited
1965	Mirage	Receptionist	Uncredited
1967	A Guide for the Married Man	Mousey Man's Wife	
1970	Song of Norway	Mrs. Thoresen	
