= Lydecker brothers =

20th century American special effect people

Howard Lydecker
- Born: June 8, 1911; Havana, Cuba
- Died: September 26, 1969 (aged 58)
- Other name: Babe
- Occupation: Special effects
- Employer: Republic Pictures

Theodore Lydecker
- Born: November 7, 1908; Englewood, New Jersey
- Died: May 25, 1990 (aged 81)
- Other name: Ted
- Occupation: Special effects
- Employer: Republic Pictures

Howard "Babe" Lydecker (June 8, 1911 – September 26, 1969) and Theodore "Ted" Lydecker (November 7, 1908 – May 25, 1990), billed together as Howard and Theodore Lydecker, were a special effects team primarily working under contract to Republic Pictures. They are best remembered as the producers and photographers of some of the best miniature effects of their time.

== Career ==
The Lydecker brothers worked at Republic from its creation in 1935 until the company could no longer afford to maintain full-time contract players and behind-the-camera artists in the mid-1950s. Thereafter, they went freelance and found themselves in significant demand for both film and television work. Their miniature effects made Republic serials the best for visual effects, far outstripping their competitors at Columbia and Universal (Universal's special-effects master John P. Fulton, ASC, was forbidden from working on serials).

Whereas most studios would use small models, set up on a tabletop and filmed indoors, Babe and Ted Lydecker built large, detailed models and filmed them in natural light, often in forced perspective to create realistic impressions that they were in fact life-size in relation to other objects and people in a shot. Slow motion gave the Lydeckers' models the appearance of realistic weight when in action. For instance, in Adventures of Captain Marvel, the visuals of airborne Captain Marvel appear to be an actual man in flight, not a matted or superimposed image.

Republic was predominantly geared to action films, with ambitiously staged outdoor sequences involving explosions, plane crashes, automobiles and trucks plunging off of cliffs, and other elaborate scenes. Many of these were staged by the Lydecker brothers for Republic's popular adventure serials. When the studio economized on serials in the late 1940s, filming fewer major stunt sequences, the serial unit began consulting its backlog of spectacular scenes already filmed, with the impressive miniature work conceived by the Lydecker brothers. Thus serials dating from the mid-1950s would reuse highlights from various serials dating as far back as 1939.

== Recognition ==
The brothers were nominated for a Best Visual Effects Academy Award in 1941 for Women in War and Howard was nominated again in 1943 for Flying Tigers.

Later they worked in feature films and Irwin Allen productions such as Lost in Space and Voyage to the Bottom of the Sea. In 1966 Howard won the Emmy for "Individual Achievement In Cinematography" with L. B. Abbott for Voyage to the Bottom of the Sea.

== Partial filmography ==
- Darkest Africa (1936, serial)
- Women in War (1940) Oscar nominated
- Adventures of Captain Marvel (1941, serial)
- Flying Tigers (1942) Oscar nominated
- Flame of the Barbary Coast (1945)
- Government Agents vs. Phantom Legion (1951, serial)
- Fair Wind to Java (1953)
- Commando Cody: Sky Marshal of the Universe (1952, serial -- also shown as a television series)
- Voyage to the Bottom of the Sea (1964-1968) Emmy winner

== See also ==
- Lydecker House
