= Manhunt in Space =

- A DVD cover for Manhunt in Space
- Directed by: Hollingsworth Morse
- Written by: Arthur Hoerl
- Produced by: Roland D. Reed; Guy V. Thayer Jr. Arthur Pierson
- Starring: Richard Crane; Scotty Beckett; Sally Mansfield
- Cinematography: Guy Roe
- Edited by: Fred Maguire
- Music by: Alexander Laszlo
- Distributed by: United Television Programs Inc.
- Release date: 1954
- Running time: 78 minutes
- Country: United States
- Language: English

Manhunt in Space is a 75-minute 1954 American science fiction film, consisting of three consecutive episodes of the TV series Rocky Jones, Space Ranger, which told a continuous story. It was released only on 16mm for home movie rental and television syndication. It was directed by Hollingsworth Morse. The film is now in the public domain. It appeared as an episode of the American television comedy series Mystery Science Theater 3000 in 1992.

== Plot ==
Space Rangers Rocky Jones and co-pilot Winky of the United Planets are assigned to investigate the disappearance of several space ships in the vicinity of Cassa 7, a planet on which the United Planets are attempting to build an outpost. Immediately upon being given the assignment Jones discovers that the ship of fellow Space Ranger Reggie and friend Vena Ray, who is aboard to visit her brother Paul Ray on Cassa 7, have become the latest victims of the mysterious disappearances. Upon reaching orbit around Cassa 7, Reggie and Vena are rescued by Jones and Winky, and it is revealed to the Rangers that the missing ships are actually being hijacked by a group of space pirates led by Rinkman, using a method created by partner in crime Dr. Vanko in which the ships' power and equipment are neutralized, turning them into artificial satellites of Cassa 7. Jones speculates that the pirates must be operating from a base at the nearby planet of Prah, on which no unauthorized landing has ever successfully taken place due to an unknown defense barrier. Meanwhile, on the planet Ophecius, we learn that its ruler, Queen Cleolanta, is actually the one employing the pirates and is behind the looting of the vessels near Cassa 7. Jones and Winky seek help from Professor Newton who offers to equip their vessel with a cloaking device utilizing "cold light" (it is explained that as heat can cause things which aren't there to visually appear, such as mirages, cold can purportedly cause objects to visually disappear). Using cold light, Jones successfully lands on Prah and discovers — after being captured by Rinkman and made an offer to join him as a pirate in exchange for the cold light device — that the pirates are actually working for someone else, although Rinkman doesn't reveal who it is. With Winky's help, Jones escapes and the two flee Prah.

Down on Cassa 7, Space Traffic Controller Ken is secretly a double agent working for the pirates, and informs them of Rocky Jones' arrival. The pirates come to Cassa 7 and capture Rocky, who is bound and tied next to Ken's Martian assistant Hagar Nu, also bound and tied. Hagar Nu explains to Jones that he was kidnapped by Ken in order to frame him as the inside pirate collaborator. Jones and Hagar manage to escape, and Jones manages to trick the pirates into thinking his (still invisible) ship is no longer on the planet by switching a mark Ken had made on a platform to denote its location. Ken is captured by Jones, but manages to break free for a moment and warn the pirates over the loudspeaker. Hagar plants plastic explosives in the nozzle of the pirate's ship which will detonate on takeoff, but Jones is determined to take them alive and leaves to warn the pirates of the danger. Rinkman ignores Jones' warning and a fight ensues. The other pirates attempt to launch, but the ship doesn't respond, and a fistfight between Jones, Winky, and the pirates ensues, with Space Rangers emerging victorious. Winky reveals that he had disabled the ship's fuel pumps, thus preventing it from launching. The film ends with Winky pondering whether or not a girl is still waiting for him to go on a date, and offering to see if she has a friend for Jones.

The story is continued in Crash of Moons.

== Cast ==
- Richard Crane as Rocky Jones
- Scotty Beckett as Winky
- Sally Mansfield as Vena Ray
- Robert Lyden as Bobby
- Maurice Cass as Professor Newton
- Patsy Parsons as Cleolanta
- Henry Brandon as Rinkman
- Charles Meredith as Secretary Drake
- Ray Montgomery as Ranger Reggie
- Tom Brown as Paul Ray
- Gabriel Curtiz as Dr. Vanko
- James Griffith as Space Traffic Controller Ken
- Judd Holdren as Ranger Higgins

== Availability ==
The movie is now available on DVD as a single DVD from Alpha Videos, in a six-disc set also from Alpha Videos, and in a DVD collection from Mystery Science Theater 3000.
