= Crash of Moons =

- DVD cover
- Directed by: Hollingsworth Morse
- Written by: Warren Wilson
- Produced by: Roland D. Reed; Guy V. Thayer Jr. Arthur Pierson
- Starring: Richard Crane; Scotty Beckett; Sally Mansfield
- Cinematography: Guy Roe
- Edited by: Fred Maguire
- Music by: Alexander Laszlo
- Distributed by: United Television Programs Inc.
- Release date: July 10, 1954
- Running time: 78 minutes
- Country: United States
- Language: English

Crash of Moons (often misidentified as Crash of the Moons) is a 75-minute 1954 American science fiction compilation film, consisting of three consecutive episodes of the television series Rocky Jones, Space Ranger, edited into a complete story.

== Plot ==
Rocky Jones, a leading member of the Space Ranger force, attempts to save the inhabitants of Ophecius, a planet about to collide with a moon. However, Cleolanta—the empress of the planet—is suspicious. While Rocky and his crew succeed in evacuating the planet in time, Cleolanta's pride and vanity are a major hindrance. As the last of the planet's population leaves, Cleolanta arrogantly declares that she will stay behind. Her assistant refuses to allow this, and picks her up against her will and carries her on board Rocky's own ship, the Orbit Jet. She watches in despair as the moon crashes into her planet, the two bodies destroying one another instantly. As the ship heads for the new home that has been chosen for her people, Cleolanta realizes that she had been wrong, and that, as stated by one of her underlings, "it is the people that make a nation, not the land itself". She reconciles with Rocky and his crew, and sincerely thanks them for their efforts on her behalf and that of her people.

== Cast ==
- Richard Crane as Rocky Jones
- Sally Mansfield as Vena Ray
- Scotty Beckett as Winky
- John Banner as Bavarro
- Nan Leslie as Trinka
- Patsy Parsons as Queen Cleolanta
- Harry Lauter as Atlasan
- Robert Lyden as Bobby
- Maurice Cass as Prof. Newton
- Charles Meredith as Secretary Drake
- Lane Bradford as Lasvon
- Rand Brooks as Andrews

== Reception ==
The Encyclopedia of Science Fiction found the movie to be unpretentious, with many scientific inaccuracies, and while not the best of the era, but found it to be better than expected.

== Production ==
Crash of Moons was directed by Hollingsworth Morse. Unlike many of the series of the era, Rocky Jones was filmed rather than being shown live. This allowed the preservation of the series while many other series of the time have been lost. The syndicated series was usually structured in three 30-minute episode arcs. This was done to allow the episodes to be edited into movies for release on TV. The other movies in this series are Beyond the Moon, Duel in Space, Forbidden Moon, Gypsy Moon, The Magnetic Moon, Manhunt in Space, Menace from Outer Space, Renegade Satellite, and Robot of Regalio.

While Cleolanta had been a frequent villain in the series, Crash of Moons marks the end of the character in the Rocky Jones series. Succeeding episodes contain a new villain.

== Home media ==
Crash of Moons was initially released on 16 mm for home movie rental and television syndication.

The film is now in the public domain, resulting in several releases on VHS and DVD from various publishers and in multi-film packs. The full episodes were also released as a DVD set.

The film is featured in episode #417 of Mystery Science Theater 3000 and is available on DVD as part of the Mystery Science Theater 3000: Volume XVIII collection from Shout Factory.
