= List of fictional spacecraft =

This is a list of fictional spacecraft, starships and exo-atmospheric vessels that have been identified by name in notable published works of fiction. The term "spacecraft" is mainly used to refer to spacecraft that are real or conceived using present technology. The terms "spaceship" and "starship" are generally applied only to fictional space vehicles, usually those capable of transporting people.

Spaceships are often one of the key plot devices in science fiction. Numerous short stories and novels are built up around various ideas for spacecraft, and spacecraft have featured in many films and television series. Some hard science fiction books focus on the technical details of the craft. Some fictional spaceships have been referenced in the real world, notably Starship Enterprise from Star Trek which gave its name to Space Shuttle Enterprise and to the VSS Enterprise. For other ships from Star Wars, Star Trek, Robotech, and other major franchises, see the separate lists linked below.

== Shuttles ==
(Planetary surface to orbit)

- Altair 8 – A suborbital passenger liner that suffers catastrophic damage in the opening of Planetes, a series with a focus on hazardous space debris
- Betty Boop – Intership shuttle used by the protagonists in Gemina, the second book in the Illuminae series, to prevent timeline collapse by returning the corpses of the respective timelines' protagonist to their own universe.
- Kingfisher – A craft that docks with an unnamed modular Mars cycler spacecraft for a two-year Mars mission in the 2021 film Stowaway.
- Moonrakers – Drax Industries NASA-style Space Shuttles featured in the 1979 James Bond film Moonraker and in the 2012 video game 007 Legends.
- Orion III ("Pan Am Space Clipper") – A shuttle used to transport Heywood Floyd into space, in 2001: A Space Odyssey
- SSTO-TAV-37B Space Shuttlecraft – Used in James Cameron's 2009 film Avatar
- Pathfinder (OV-201) - NERVA powered second-generation Space Shuttle orbiter from season 2 of TV series For All Mankind, capable of cislunar flight with orbital refuelling; the series features another fictional shuttles
- Shuttle unnamed Earth Alliance in Gundam seed 73 Ova (2006)
- Shuttle unnamed film Voyager 2021
- Shuttle unnamed geostorm

=== Space Shuttle orbiters ===
- Atlantis II - In the 2010 anime film Metal Fight Beyblade vs the Sun: Sol Blaze, the Scorching Hot Invader, a dual finned space shuttle inspired by Atlantis is used to launch into space and destroy asteroid Adonis.
- Churchill – A joint British-US shuttle from the 1985 film, Lifeforce
- Daedalus – Space Cowboys
- Explorer – From the 2013 film Gravity
- Excalibur – Hank Henshaw's shuttle in Superman comics.
- Excursion – In the 1998 film Species II goes on the first trip to Mars with detachable docking station.
- Intrepid – In Payne Harrison's novel Storming Intrepid
- Lancet - In the German TV series Raumpatrouille, in English, Space Patrol - Orion.
- Messiah – In the 1997 film Deep Impact with modified Space Shuttle-section and landing craft.
- Navigator – A NASA shuttle that experiences a serious accident in the 2025 novel Atmosphere.
- Odyssey – Odyssey 5
- OV-165 - An orbiter from the second generation of NASA orbiters, in Star Trek: Enterprise
- Pleiades – In David Brin's novel Earth
- R-352 Sepia – A shuttle developed by Neucom Incorporated for orbital satellite interception in Ace Combat 3: Electrosphere
- R-808 Phoca – A transport shuttle used by Neucom Incorporated in Ace Combat 3: Electrosphere
- Roger – An anthropomorphic NASCA (a play on "NASA", "car" and "NASCAR") Space Shuttle orbiter in the Cars Toons episode "Moon Mater"
- X-71 shuttles (Freedom and Independence) – Specialized USAF Space Shuttle orbiters with separable rocket booster from the 1998 film Armageddon
- Lupin special 5 Voyage to Danger

== Lunar ==
- Aries Ib – Passenger lunar lander in 2001: A Space Odyssey
- Eagle Transporter – Moonbase Alpha's modular service craft in Space: 1999
- Friede – Moon rocket in 1929 German film Frau im Mond (Woman in the Moon)
- Mark IX Hawk – A space fighter similar to the Eagle in Space: 1999
- Mayflower One – Airplane II: The Sequel
- Unnamed "projectile" – From the Earth to the Moon and Around the Moon by Jules Verne (1865)

== Interplanetary ==
(Planetary on other)

- Aether – A large modular crewed spacecraft returning from a two-year mission in the ongoing colonization of the fictional habitable Jovian moon X-13 in the 2020 film The Midnight Sky
- Anastasia – Dan Dare's personal ship
- Bebop – The titular ship of the series Cowboy Bebop
- Bilkis – An experimental spaceship in the anime series Geneshaft
- Cepheus – A ship made for transport between different bases and colonies in the deep Solar System in the film Ad Astra.
- Democratic Circus – An interplanetary cruiser used for defensive and policing actions within the Epsilon Eridani system seen in the Revelation Space series.
- Discovery One – A scientific research spacecraft sent to Jupiter in the novels: 2001: A Space Odyssey and 2010: Odyssey Two and the corresponding films: 2001: A Space Odyssey (1968) and 2010: The Year We Make Contact (1984).
- Europa One – A scientific research spacecraft made to send astronauts to Jupiter's moon Europa to find extraterrestrial life under the moons surface in Europa Report.
  - Lander – A ship used as a way to transport the crew of Europa One to the surface of Europa. It contains mining and recording materials to search for alien life under the surface of the moon.
- Excelsior – From the 1918 Danish film Himmelskibet (A Trip to Mars), "The film that marked the beginning of the space opera subgenre of science fiction." – Phil Hardy
- F-302 Mongoose – Air/space/hyperdrive strike craft in Stargate SG-1
- Hermes – A reusable NASA spacecraft manufactured by the Jet Propulsion Laboratory for the Ares program to Mars in Andy Weir's and Ridley Scott's The Martian
  - Iris Resupply Probe – Resupply probe, designed to give Mark Watney enough food to survive until Ares 4. The probe exploded during launch due to a rushed design and manufacturing stage.
  - MAV (Mars Ascent Vehicle) and MDV (Mars Descent Vehicle) landers – Non-reusable landers used during the Ares missions
- Hunter IV – Personal fighter of Samus Aran from the Metroid series
- Icarus I and Icarus II – Spaceships from the 2007 film Sunshine
- LCAM-01XA Archangel – a state-of-the-art warship from the anime Mobile Suit Gundam SEED and SEED Destiny. The first of its class, which it also takes its name from Archangel. She has a nearly identical sister-ship known as the Dominion. Both ships are named after the hierarchy of angels.
- Lewis & Clark – Rescue ship sent to retrieve the Event Horizon
- Mars I and Mars II – from the 2000 film Mission to Mars
- Messiah – an Orion spacecraft designed to prevent a comet hitting Earth in the 1998 film Deep Impact
- Nightflyer – craft from the American horror science fiction television series Nightflyers
- Nile-class – A class of battleship in Mobile Suit Gundam 00 the Movie: A Wakening of the Trailblazer
- Odyssey – spacecraft designed to visit Saturn's moon Titan in the 2013 film Oblivion
- Orbit Jet – United Worlds XV-2 Rocky Jones, Space Ranger, 1954 TV series
- Rocinante – Martian corvette, centerpiece of The Expanse (TV series and novel series)
- Rocket – From Little Einsteins
- Ryvius – The title spacecraft from the anime series Infinite Ryvius
- SA-43 Hammerhead Mk 1 – U.S.M.C. VTOL atmosphere/space fighter in 2063 Space: Above and Beyond, 1995 TV series
- Scorpio E-X-1 – It's About Time
- Serenity – A transport spacecraft from the TV series Firefly and the 2005 science fiction film Serenity
- Turtle – An interplanetary spaceship, named after its carapace-like shape in Cobra
- SCV-70 White Base – The mothership of the makeshift Earth Federation crew and the RX-78-2 Gundam in Mobile Suit Gundam.
- USS Cygnus – from The Black Hole
- Valley Forge – American Airlines space freighter, outfitted with geodesic dome greenhouses preserving the last forests in the 1972 film Silent Running
- Zero-X – A spacecraft from Thunderbirds Are Go

== Interstellar ==
=== Military or exploration ===
- Access Ark - A planet-sized spacecraft owned by the Haltmann Works Company, who invade Popstar and mechanize its landscape in Kirby: Planet Robobot. It eventually merges with Star Dream, acting as the final boss of the game.
- Alexander 78v – A United Terrain Authority (UTA) Battlecarrier, which helped evacuate rescuees from the battle on Kerenza IV in the Illuminae Files.
- Amaterasu (天照) – The third Freedom Guard Ship of the Kibi Planetary Nation (Starship Operators)
- Arcadia (アルカディア号) – The most powerful space battleship in the Captain Harlock universe, created by Tochiro Oyama as his final gift to his friend Harlock before his inevitable death.
- Argonaut – The most advanced starship of the Iron Tribe in the anime series Heroic Age
- Ark – A flagship commanded by Optimus Prime in several Transformers series. The ship's computer, Teletraan I, provides intelligence to the Autobots for their various missions.
- Aurora – Private starship owned by Alterra in Subnautica. It was intended to terraform planets, but was shot down when attempting a slingshot maneuver around planet 4546B.
- Athena – A starship which transports humans to a space station orbiting the planet Solaris in the 2002 film Solaris
- Avalon – The Homestead Company (also using Sony hardware) starliner in the film Passengers, which transports emigrants from the Earth to Homestead II
- Axalon – A Maximal exploration ship in the Beast Wars: Transformers series
- Axiom – The Buy n' Large starliner in the films WALL-E and BURN-E, which is used, together with other starships, to provide a temporary home for humanity. Its originally planned five-year mission ended up lasting 700 years.
- Basroil – A starship commanded by Lafiel in the anime series Banner of the Stars
- Battlestars – Actually Spacecraft carriers, all destroyed except Galactica and Pegasus. the capital ships in Battlestar Galactica
- Basestar – The Cylon capital ships in the Battlestar Galactica universe
- Bellerophon – The ship that took colonists to Altair IV in Forbidden Planet
- Black Boa (MXOV-801) - A spacecraft featured in the 2001 film Final Fantasy: The Spirits Within
- Blip-A – A light-propelled ship built and crewed by Eridians in Project Hail Mary.
- C-57D – The United Planets cruiser that was sent to the planet Altair IV in Forbidden Planet
- Conquistador – The largest battleship of the Henrietta Planetary Alliance (Starship Operators)
- Copernicus – An independent explorer/hauler, the Copernicus helped rescue and transport evacuees of the Battle on Kerenza IV in the Illuminae Files. It was destroyed by Alexander's Artificial Intelligence Defense Analytics Network (A.I.D.A.N) when an outbreak of Phobos, a bioweapon engineered by Beitech Industries for urban pacification, rendered it a threat to the fleet.
- Daban Urnud – An interdimensional starship that visits the planet of Arbre in the Neil Stephenson novel Anathem
- "The Derelict" – The name given to the abandoned alien spacecraft discovered by the crew of the deep space tug Nostromo in the film Alien (1979)
- Darksyde – The Predacon transwarp ship in the Beast Wars television series.
- Destiny Ascension – An Asari dreadnaught with a crew of 10,000 that serves as the flagship of the Citadel fleet in the Mass Effect universe
- EAS Agamemnon – (Babylon 5)
- Eltrium – Earth's flagship of its interstellar fleet originally created as an evacuation ship in case of extraterrestrial attacks in Gunbuster.
- Endurance – NASA spacecraft/space station hybrid capable of traveling through wormholes, mothership to Rangers and Landers in Interstellar
  - Lander – Two cargo spacecraft used in the Endurance mission to transport materials from the Endurance to Mann's planet; Lander 1 is later used by TARS to propel the craft far enough from SMBH Gargantua.
  - Ranger – Various SSTO spaceplanes featured in Interstellar: the Ranger Test Article, piloted by Cooper during his crash; the twelve Rangers used during the Lazarus missions to carry astronauts through the wormhole to twelve potentially habitable planets; Ranger 1 and Ranger 2 used to carry personnel from the Endurance to Miller's, Mann's and Edmunds's planets (Ranger 2 is later used by Cooper like TARS's Lander); the futuristic Rangers, used around Saturn as the Cooper station's auxiliary craft (one is later stolen by Cooper and TARS to rejoin with Amelia on Edmunds's planet).
- Event Horizon – A gravity drive exploration starship, aiming to explore Proxima Centauri, disappears on its maiden voyage and rediscovered seven years later with its crew missing, a space-borne "Mary Celeste"
- Exelion – A 12 kilometer long warship originally commissioned as Earth's flagship in Gunbuster.
- Hail Mary – A research craft, powered by the fictional microorganism astrophage, that is sent on a one way trip to Tau Ceti in Project Hail Mary.
- Hydra - A space battle cruiser in the series Raumpatrouille, the translation for English language - Space Patrol Orion.
- Hypatia – Long range scientific exploration vessel used to escort evacuees from the Battle of Kerenza IV in the Illuminae Files.
- Hyperion – The flagship of Jim Raynor in StarCraft
- IMS Draconis – A Heavy-Transport vessel operated by the Interstellar Manufacturing Corporation in Titanfall 2.
- IMS Malta – A battleship-type vessel operated by the Interstellar Manufacturing Corporation in Titanfall 2.
- IMS Thermopylae – A transport vessel operated by the Interstellar Manufacturing Corporation in Titanfall 2.
- ISA Excalibur – Earth Alliance (Babylon 5)
- Icarus – A near-light speed ship with onboard cryogenic chambers used to land astronauts on habitable worlds thousands of light years away to ensure the survival of the human race in Planet Of The Apes
- Island Cluster Class Colonization Ship 25 (Macross Frontier) – Colony Fleet consisting on a transformable fighting ship, the main population vessel and other smaller islands from the anime Macross Frontier
- JJ-386 – Cobra mkIII piloted by John Jameson, which crashed into the planet HIP 12099 1 B following its unknowing biological attack on a Thargoid 'Hiveship.'
- Jupiter 2 – Nuclear-powered spacecraft from the television series Lost in Space (1965–68)
- Justice of Toren – Sentient troop carrier from the Imperial Radch book series. The ship is the main character and narrator of the book series, also known as Breq from the Gerentate.
- Karrajor – A warship from the Cartoon Network series Megas XLR. It serves as a mothership for the squid-like alien race known as the Glorft.
- Kobayashi Maru - A fictional starship in a training simulation at Starfleet Academy in the Star Trek series.
- R.L.S. Legacy – A space exploration vessel from the Disney animated film Treasure Planet. It is a space ship that is designed to emulate a sailing ship from the 1600s.
- Leonora Christine – A colonization starship utilizing the fictional Bussard ramjet drive in the novel Tau Zero to create enough speed for onboard time dilation to occur so the passengers can reach the far away Beta Virginis star within their lifetime.
- Liberator – Blake's 7
- Libertad – A sub-light speed training ship in the anime series Strain: Strategic Armored Infantry
- MCS James Macallan – Flagship of the 9th Militia Fleet of the Frontier Militia and the namesake of its class of carriers, it was named after James MacAllan, a major character from the first Titanfall game. It is also the first ship to be destroyed during the battle between Militia forces and the IMC Space forces on the planet Typhon.
- MCS Carter Braxton – A carrier used by the Frontier Militia of Titanfall 2, the ship was destroyed by the IMC Battleship Malta during the battle at the skies of Typhon.
- Megazone – The title spaceship in the OVA series Megazone 23
- Minbari – Victory-class destroyer based on Vorlon technology from the Babylon 5 universe
- Murray Leinster – Destroyed at the beginning of the cult film Starcrash
- Nautilus – Flagship space yacht of International Transport Spacelines from Event[0]
- Nauvoo – A Mormon-owned religious space exploration generational ship in The Expanse used to travel a 100-year period to the star Tau Ceti.
- Nemesis – Flagship of the Decepticons (Transformers)
- Nirvana – A supership from the anime series Vandread
- Normandy SR-1 – A Systems Alliance Navy frigate that serves as Commander Shepard's base of operations in the Mass Effect universe. Sequels feature a larger and more advanced version known as the SR-2.
- NSEA Protector – A starship from the cult film Galaxy Quest
- Olympus Mons – The flagship of the Settlement Defense Front fleet in Call of Duty: Infinite Warfare.
- Orbit Jet – Winged-tail rocket ship (Rocky Jones, Space Ranger)
- Orion VII – A fast combat space patrol craft in Raumpatrouille Replaced by Orion VIII in the second episode of the tv series.
- Prometheus – Weyland Corporation scientific vessel
- Raza – An interstellar spaceship from the television series Dark Matter
- Red Dwarf – The titular spaceship from the BBC sci-fi comedy series Red Dwarf
- Retribution – The only operational carrier after an SDF attack in Call of Duty: Infinite Warfare.
- SDF-1 Macross – A massive interstellar transforming spacecraft from the anime Super Dimension Fortress Macross and its American adaptation, Robotech
- Rodger Young – Corvette transport in the novel Starship Troopers
- SDF-3 Pioneer – The flagship of Admiral Rick Hunter in Robotech: The Shadow Chronicles
- Searcher – Space exploration vessel from the second season of Buck Rogers in the 25th Century
- Shangri-La – The mothership of the Mu race in the manga and anime series Toward the Terra.
- Star Destroyer – Capital ships used by the Galactic Republic, the Galactic Empire and the First Order and the Rebel Alliance in the Star Wars universe
- Starship Tipton – A fictional re-imagining of the SS Tipton cruise liner from the Disney Channel Original Series The Suite Life on Deck. It serves as the main setting in the self-titled episode "Starship Tipton".
- USS Sulaco – Conestoga-class light assault carrier from the sequel Aliens
- Swordbreaker – A mysterious spaceship owned by Kain Blueriver in the anime series Lost Universe
- Tau - A galactic security service space cruiser in the final episode of the series Raumpatrouille, the translation for English language - Space Patrol Orion.
- Terra V – Buzz Corey's space cruiser in Space Patrol
- Tigris – The only operational destroyer after a massive attack by the SDF in Call of Duty: Infinite Warfare.
- Titan – The title spaceship in the film Titan A.E
- UESC Marathon – The title ship of the video game Marathon which was crafted out of Deimos.
- UNSC Forward Unto Dawn – The Charon-class light frigate in the UNSC Navy commanded by Commander Miranda Keyes in Halo 3
- UNSC In Amber Clad – The Stalwart-class frigate in the UNSC Navy commanded by Commander Miranda Keyes in Halo 2
- UNSC Infinity – The post-war flagship of the UNSC Navy in Halo 4, Halo 5: Guardians, and Halo Infinite. It was presumed destroyed in Halo Infinite by the Banished
- UNSC Pillar of Autumn – The Halcyon-class cruiser in the UNSC Navy commanded by Captain Jacob Keyes in Halo: Combat Evolved
- USCSS Nostromo — A commercial space tug in the film Alien
- USG Ishimura – A planet-cracking mining vessel and the main setting of the first game of Dead Space. It is also referred to as the 'beginning of the Necromorph's takeover'.
- USS Cerritos – The primary ship in Star Trek: Lower Decks; see Starfleet ships for more information.
- USS Defiant – The name of three ships that feature in various Star Trek media. The most notable Defiant appears in Star Trek: Deep Space Nine from its introduction in the third season's premiere episode "The Search" until its destruction in the seventh season episode "The Changing Face of Evil".
- USS Discovery – the primary ship in Star Trek: Discovery, which travels instantaneously through space using a mycelial network.
- USS Enterprise – The name of several space exploration vessels in the Star Trek franchise.
- USS Orville – The titular vessel from the TV series The Orville.
- USS Protostar – The primary ship in Star Trek: Prodigy, which utilizes a protostar to travel considerably faster than conventional warp speed.
- USS Saratoga – A space carrier in Space: Above and Beyond, aboard which serve the members of the U.S. Marine Corps Space Aviator Cavalry, 58th Squadron, or "Wildcards"
- USS Voyager – The primary ship in Star Trek: Voyager.
- Valkyrie – Titan A.E.
- Vanguard – A generational ship from Robert A. Heinlein's Orphans of the Sky
- Venture Star – A starship transporting humans to the moon Pandora in the 2009 film Avatar
- Vonnegut – Spaceship transporting AIs of humans to the Proxima Centauri star system in the 2020 book Ready Player Two
- Von Braun – An unmanned spacecraft that transports three probes to explore a planet called Darwin IV. The spacecraft is featured in the 2005 docufiction special, Alien Planet.
- Silver Wings of Morning – A starship owned by Purslane Gentian of the Gentian line in House of Suns. One of the fastest ships in that known universe.
- Yamato (大和) – the title spaceship of the anime series Space Battleship Yamato. It was named The Argo in the American localized version, titled Star Blazers, that was published by Claster Television and Sunwagon Production companies between 1979 and 1984.
- Yggdrasil – A starship owned by the Templars and used for the transportation of the nine Pilgrims to the planet Hyperion in the novel Hyperion

=== Space fighters ===
"Space fighters" are fictional spacecraft analogous to fighter aircraft. They are popular as the subjects of flight simulators, films and books. The following are some examples of notable space fighters from various media franchises:

==== Babylon 5 ====
The Earth Alliance (Starfury fighters)

- SA-23E Aurora
- SA-23J Thunderbolt
- Raider Fighter

The Minbari Federation

- Nial-class heavy fighter

The Narn Regime

- Frazi-class fighter

The Centauri Republic

- Sentri-class medium fighter

The Shadows

- Shadow fighter

The Vorlons

- Vorlon fighter

==== Battlestar Galactica ====
The Twelve Colonies

- Colonial Viper
- Colonial Viper MK. II
- Colonial Blackbird
- Colonial Raptor

The Cylons

- Cylon Raider
- Cylon Heavy Raider

==== Buck Rogers in the 25th Century ====
The Earth Defense Directorate

- Star Fighter
- Hawk's Fighter

The Draconian Empire

- Draconian Marauder

==== The Last Starfighter ====
- Star League Gunstar

==== Space: Above and Beyond ====
The United States Marine Corps

- SA-43 Hammerhead Endo/Exo-Atmospheric Attack Jet

The Chigs

- Chig fighter

==== Space: 1999 ====
Terrestrial

- Mark IX Hawk

Extraterrestrial

- Sidon warships
- Guardal Canal
- Bethan and Deltan spacecraft

==== Stargate ====
Tau'ri/Earth (USAF fighters)

- X-301
- F-302

The Goa'uld

- Death glider
- Needle Threader

The Wraith

- Wraith dart

The Ori

- Ori fighter

==== Star Wars ====
In the Star Wars universe, a "starfighter" is a blanket term for all small combat space craft, regardless of shields, hyperspace capability, weaponry (unless it carries none), armor, maneuverability and crew. "Snubfighter" (a term first used in Star Wars), though no concise definition has been given, often refers to a fighter carrying shielding, secondary weapons systems such as proton torpedoes or concussion missiles, and being hyperspace capable. Starfighters sometimes bear mission designations similar to modern fighter aircraft, such as "strike fighter" and "space superiority fighter".

Galactic Republic

- ARC-170 starfighter
- V-19 Torrent starfighter
- V-wing starfighter
- Jedi starfighter
- Jedi interceptor
- Naboo starfighter

Rebel Alliance and New Republic

- A-wing
- B-wing
- U-wing
- X-wing
- Y-wing

Galactic Empire and First Order

- Various TIE fighter models

Confederacy of Independent Systems

- Droid starfighter (Vulture droid)
- Geonosian starfighter
- Droid Tri-Fighter

==== Other properties ====
===== Andromeda =====
- RF-42 Centaur Tactical Fighter

===== Halo =====
- UNSC C-709 Longsword Interceptor
- UNSC YSS-1000 Sabre Space Superiority Fighter – notably, uses a Shuttle-style booster system for planetary launch
- UNSC F-41 Broadsword Exo-atmospheric Multirole Strike Fighter

===== Marvel Cinematic Universe =====
- Dark Aster, the ship of Ronan the Accuser in Guardians of the Galaxy
- Milano, the ship of Peter Quill in Guardians of the Galaxy and Guardians of the Galaxy Vol. 2. It is replaced by a similar ship, the Benatar in Avengers: Infinity War, and Avengers: Endgame.
- Sanctuary II, the ship of Thanos in Thor: Ragnarok, Avengers: Infinity War, and Avengers: Endgame
- Statesman, the ship carrying surviving Asgardians to Earth in Thor: Ragnarok

===== Gradius =====
- Vic Viper

=== Transportation ===
- Aniara (Aniara) – A large spacecraft designed to carry copious amounts of passengers from Earths to Mars. Aniara is capable of supporting long-term space travel, though it was not designed to do so.
- Arcadia Class Jumpship (Destiny 2) – A ship used by the player character to traverse the Solar System.
- Bretonia – Sleeper ship from the game Freelancer
- Eagle 5 – Spaceballs
- Elysium – Pandorum
- Endeavour – from Rendezvous with Rama by Arthur C. Clarke, 1973; carried explorers to rendezvous with alien spacecraft Rama
- Hispania – Sleeper ship from the game Freelancer
- Hunter-Gratzner – Pitch Black
- Kusari – Sleeper ship from the game Freelancer
- Liberty – Sleeper ship from the game Freelancer
- Millennium Falcon – Star Wars universe
- Nostromo – A modified Lockmart CM-88B Bison Transport; commercial towing vessel from the film Alien
- Out of Band II (Oobii) – A freighter from the Zones of Thought series by Vernor Vinge, the main ship used by a multi-species crew to travel to a planet near the center of the galaxy
- USS Planet Express Ship "Bessie" – Futurama
- Radiant Pillar BC1 – No Man's Sky startership; The first ship the player has access to.
- Rama – Rendezvous with Rama by Arthur C. Clarke, 1973 (an alien spaceship, their name for it unknown)
- Razor Crest – Transport ship used by Din Djarin and Grogu in The Mandalorian
- Rheinland – Sleeper ship from the game Freelancer
- The Massive – Invader Zim
- The Resisty's Ship – Invader Zim
- The Void Ark – A prisoner transport from the video game Void Bastards
- Voot Runner – Invader Zim
- The Wurst – Formerly known as The Red Hot, a freighter ship that resembles a large hot dog used by the main characters of A Starstruck Odyssey

== Intergalactic ==
- Andromeda Ascendant – Gene Roddenberry's Andromeda
- Deucalion – An enormous transforming spaceship over 63,000 km long from the anime series Kiddy Grade
- Destiny – The ship in which Stargate Universe takes place
- Stargate ship types including the Daedalus-class battlecruiser of Earth, the O'Neill-class of the Asgard or the Aurora-class of the Lanteans.
- Hyperion – An 'ark' which carries 20,000 humans to the Andromeda Galaxy in Mass Effect: Andromeda
- Lor Starcutter – A sentient flying boat that can travel across galaxies in Kirby's Return to Dream Land

== Personal spacecraft ==
- Betty – From Alien Resurrection
- EEV – Bodenwerke Gemeinschaft Type 337 Emergency Escape Vehicle in the sequel Alien 3
- Escape pods – Escape spacecraft often used in Star Wars (which in the first film were clearly inspired by the Apollo CSM)
- EVA pods – Multi-functional vehicles (nicknamed "Alice", "Betty" and "Clara" during the Discovery One mission) used in 2001: A Space Odyssey
- Heart of Gold – A spaceship powered by the Infinite Improbability Drive, stolen by the then-President of the Galaxy, Zaphod Beeblebrox in The Hitchhiker's Guide to the Galaxy
- Narcissus – A modified Lockmart Starcub Light Intrasystem Shuttle; shuttlecraft for the Weyland-Yutani commercial hauler USCSS Nostromo in the film Alien
- Phoenix – The first Earth spacecraft to achieve faster-than-light speed using warp drive; spaceship that instigated Earth's first contact with aliens in Star Trek: First Contact.
- S.T.E.V. – Short for "Shuttle Transport Emergency Vessel", a single-person spacecraft featured in the video game Void Bastards.
- SS Emporium – Taybor the Trader's spacecraft, featured in the Year Two Space: 1999 episode "The Taybor". The spaceship Emporium, inspired to the Mars Excursion Module, is equipped with a special Jump Drive engine, which allows it to travel between two points via teleportation in hyperspace.
- Starchaser – The personal ship of smuggler Dagg Dibrimi in Starchaser: The Legend of Orin.
- TARDIS (Time And Relative Dimension In Space) – various spacecraft-time machine hybrids equipped with a jump drive featured on the television series Doctor Who. Many TARDIS versions are featured, with the Doctor's TARDIS (a Type 40 TT Capsule) resembling a British police box.
  - Tardis – The police box-resembling spacetime machine in the two spin-off Dr. Who films: Dr. Who and the Daleks and Daleks' Invasion Earth: 2150 A.D..

== Lists of fictional spacecraft ==
- List of fictional space stations
- List of films featuring space stations
- List of ships in Starship Operators
- List of Space: 1999 vehicles
- List of Star Wars starfighters
- List of Star Wars spacecraft

== See also ==
- Bioship
- Flying saucer
- Foo fighter
- Interstellar ark
- Hyperspace
- Non-rocket spacelaunch
- Space dock
- Space tourism
- Spacecraft
- Starship
- Unidentified flying object
- United States gravity control propulsion research (1955–1974)
- Wormhole
