= Ethel Borden =

American screenwriter

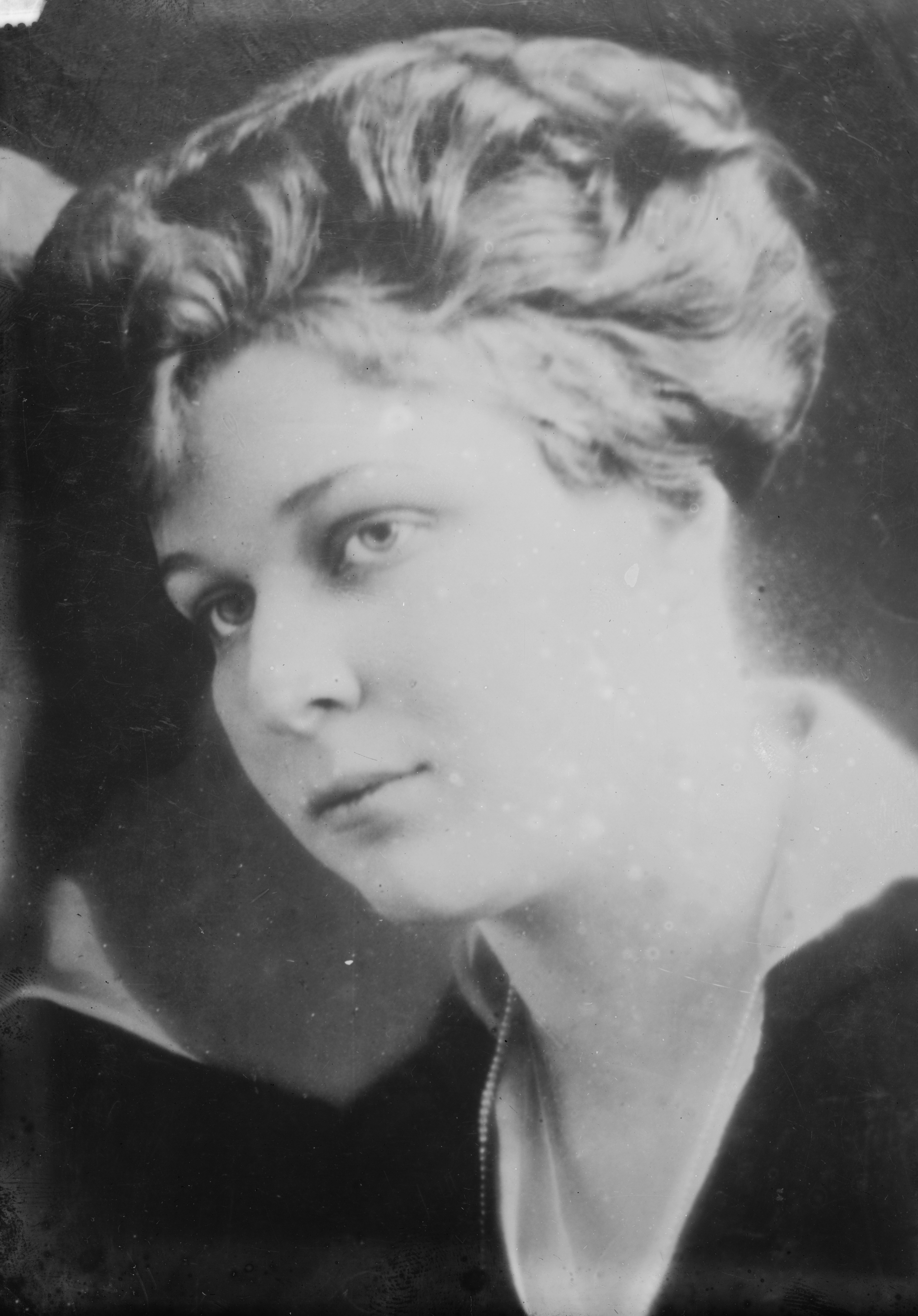
- Borden, circa 1915–1917
- Born: Ethel Borden Harriman; December 11, 1897; New York, U.S.
- Died: July 4, 1953 (aged 55); New York, U.S.
- Occupations: Screenwriter, author
- Spouse: Henry Potter Russell (m. 1918; div. 1925)
- Parent(s): J. Borden Harriman; Florence J. Harriman

Ethel Borden Harriman (December 11, 1897 – July 4, 1953) was an American author, actress, and heiress of the wealthy Harriman family. She worked as a screenwriter at MGM and RKO during the 1930s.

== Early life ==
Ethel Harriman was born into a wealthy New York family in 1897. Her father, J. Borden Harriman, was a banker, and her mother, Florence "Daisy" Hurst, was a suffragist and diplomat who served as the Minister to Norway after her father's death.

Her paternal grandparents were Laura (née Low) Harriman and banker Oliver Harriman. Her maternal grandparents were Caroline Eliza (née Jaffray) Hurst and F. W. J. Hurst, who became wealthy in the cross-Atlantic shipping business.

Ethel served with the Women's Ambulance Service in France during World War I, and afterward spent two years as an actress in a theatrical stock company.

== Career ==
She played Grace Torrence in a 1933 production of Design For Living and began writing screenplays after being encouraged to do so by playwright Noël Coward. She published a comedic book, Romantic, I Call It, in 1926, and took on writing assignments in Hollywood at MGM, penning films like They Wanted to Marry and I Live My Life under the name Ethel Borden. (Note: She dropped the name Harriman professionally to conceal her wealthy background.) She continued to act in the 1930, appearing in productions such as the Ziegfeld Follies. She is credited by the Broadway Internet Database as translating Hedda Gabler in 1942, and writing Anne of England in 1941. Ancestry census records for 1940 show her living with the 46 year old Mary Cass Canfield (author of the one act play Lackeys of the Moon) in Nassau, New York, and they were both hired by Broadway producer Gilbert Miller, so the 2 women probably collaborated on Anne of England and other works for Miller.

== Personal life ==
In 1918 Ethel married stockbroker Henry Potter Russell (1893–1943) in the American Cathedral in Paris on the Avenue de l'Alma. The "quiet wartime ceremony" was only attended by a few "intimate friends, among them Ambassador and Mrs. Sharp, Mr. and Mrs. W. K. Vanderbilt, and General Lewis. Mrs. Vincent Astor of New York served as matron of honor and Lieutenant Minot was best man." Henry was a son of Charles H. Russell of New York. Before their divorce in 1925, they were the parents of:

- Phyllis Russell (1919–2007), who married five times.
- Charles Howland Russell (1921–1981), who married Alice Gwynne Allen, a daughter of Horace Ransom Bigelow Allen and Alice (née Gwynne) Preston.

Later in her life, Borden was in a long-term relationship with the British novelist Pamela Frankau.

She died of leukemia on July 4, 1953, aged 55, in New York City.

== Selected filmography ==
- After Office Hours (1935)
- I Live My Life (1935)
- They Wanted to Marry (1937)
