= Rocky Jones, Space Ranger =

Television series

- Genre: Science fiction
- Created by: Roland D. Reed
- Written by: Warren Wilson; Arthur Hoerl; Marianne Mosner
- Directed by: Hollingsworth Morse
- Starring: Richard Crane; Sally Mansfield
- Theme music composer: Alexander Laszlo
- Country of origin: United States
- Original language: English
- No. of seasons: 1
- No. of episodes: 39

Production
- Executive producer: Guy V. Thayer, Jr.
- Running time: 25 minutes
- Production company: Roland Reed TV Productions

Original release
- Network: Syndication
- Release: October 13, 1953

Rocky Jones, Space Ranger is an American science fiction television serial originally broadcast in syndication beginning in October 1953. The show lasted for only one season produced over two recording blocks and, though syndicated sporadically, dropped into obscurity. Because it was produced on black-and-white film, rather than being broadcast live as were most other TV space operas of the day, it has survived in reasonably good condition. The filmed format also allowed more elaborate special effects and sets, exterior scenes, and much better episode continuity.

== Plot ==
The show was based on the exploits of clean-cut, square-jawed Rocky Jones, the best known of the Space Rangers. These were Earth-based space policemen who patrolled the United Worlds of the Solar System in the not-too-distant future. Rocky and his crew would routinely blast-off in a V-2-like, chemically-fueled, upright rocketship, the Orbit Jet XV-2. It was later replaced by the nearly identical Silver Moon XV-3 on missions to moons and planetoids, where the odds of success seemed remote, yet they would always prevail. Although they might destroy a rocketship full of unseen villains, their space pistols were never fired at people, and conflicts were always resolved with only fistfights.

Although many strange worlds were visited, the alien characters usually spoke American English, and always appeared as normal humans, albeit wearing bizarre costumes in normal environments. The script-writers did not appear to know the difference between planets, moons, stars, and constellations, so that the specific locations Rocky and his sidekicks visited are generally unknown to astronomers.

Half-hour episodes were usually grouped into storylines that consisted of three "chapters" that were broadcast in successive weeks. A few of the storylines were completed in a single episode.

== Characters ==
- Rocky Jones: Rocky (Richard Crane) is the quintessential action hero: brave, strong, handsome, highly moral, and always ready to defend his beliefs with action. To the women of these stories, he is irresistible, even to arch-villain Cleolanta.
- Winky: Rocky's faithful co-pilot and sidekick, the womanizing Winky was the upbeat comic relief to balance the always serious Rocky. Winky was played by Scotty Beckett, one of the original Our Gang comedies' kids. The Winky character was replaced by Biffen "Biff" Cardoza (James Lydon) from the planet Herculon after 26 episodes, when Beckett became unavailable, serving time in jail for carrying a concealed weapon.
- Vena Ray: The beautiful blond Vena serves as Rocky's navigator and translator and was a strong female role model in some episodes. She was played by character actor Sally Mansfield.
- Bobby: Bobby is the young ward of Professor Newton who wants to grow up to be a Space Ranger, and no mention was ever made of his parents or origins. He was portrayed by Robert Lyden.
- Professor Newton: Played by Maurice Cass. Professor Newton could always be counted on to provide the scientific explanation for the fantastic events that unfolded, and although elderly, he would often accompany the crew on their space adventures. The character of Professor Newton was replaced by Professor Mayberry upon Cass' death in 1954.
- Secretary Drake: As the head of the Office of Space Affairs and the Space Rangers, Secretary Drake was a father figure to Rocky and his crew, and to him Rocky was like his own son. Secretary Drake was played by Charles Meredith.
- Cleolanta: Played by Patsy Parsons. Cleolanta is the Suzerain (queen) of the planet Ophecius. She was usually the force behind the troubles that befell the United Worlds, but secretly she had a crush on Rocky. She often berated her henchmen for not measuring up to him.
- Juliandra/Noviandra: Played by Ann Robinson. Juliandra is the Suzerain of the planet Herculon and friendly to the United Worlds, and she is the one who offers the services of Biffen Cardoza as the replacement co-pilot for the Silver Moon. She has an imprisoned mad twin sister, Noviandra, who hates the United Worlds and everything for which it stands.
- Pinto Vortando: Pinto is a seedy, unshaven space rogue whose presence usually meant trouble for Rocky. He was played by Ted Hecht.
- Bovarro: Big and boisterous, he lives with his wife and young son on the storm-wracked moon Posita, one of the two "gypsy moons" (the surviving moon was called Negato) due to it crashing into Opheucius in the three episode adventure, Crash of Moons. He was played by John Banner.
- Ranger Clark: One of Rocky's fellow Rangers. Clark operates the refueling space station O.W.9. Ranger Clark was played by William Hudson.

== Production ==
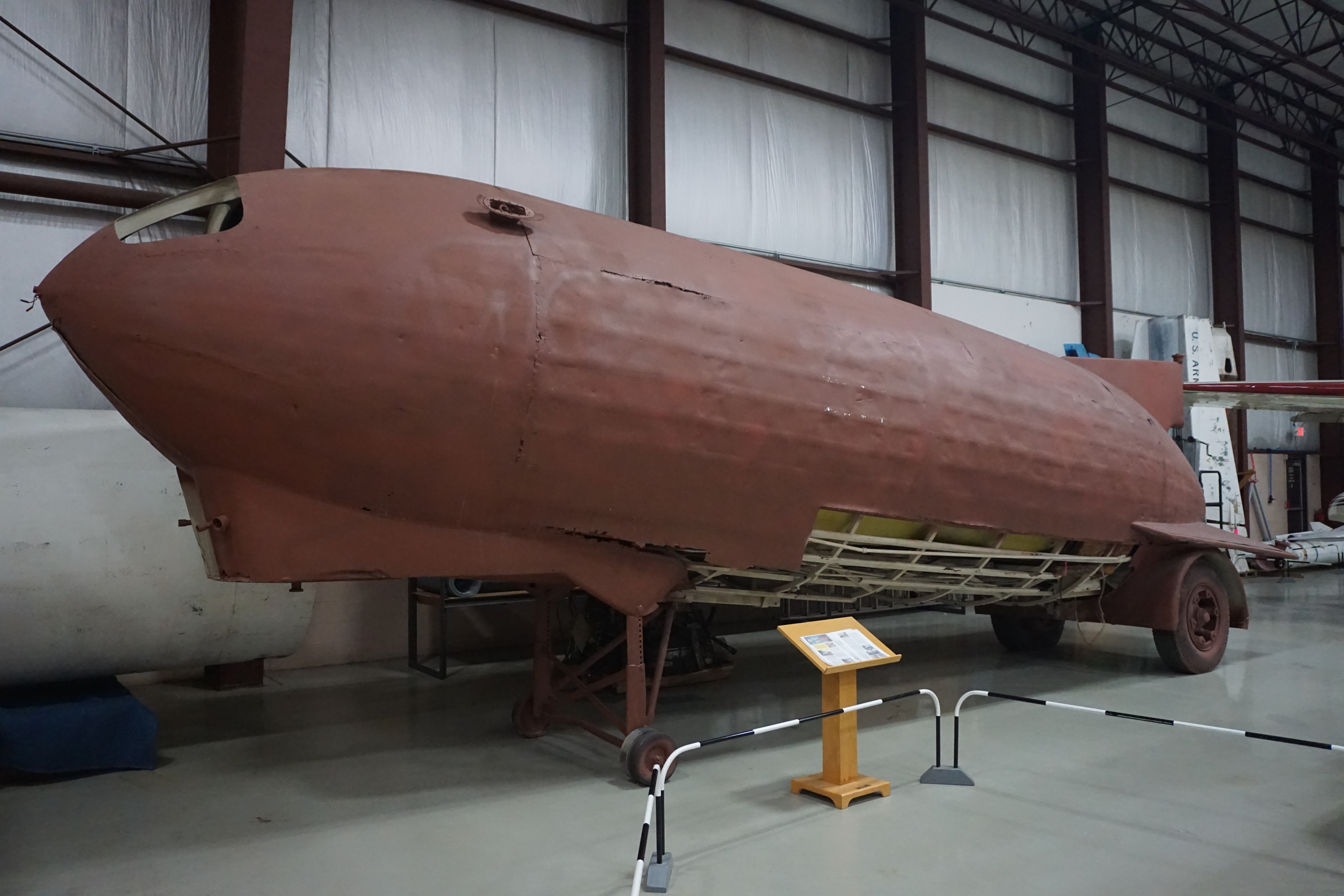
The Rocky Jones Silvercup Rocket on display at the Air Zoo

Rocky Jones was the creation of Roland D. Reed, a Hollywood producer best known for his successful My Little Margie TV series. Roland Reed Productions was founded in 1950, and in 1951 Warren Wilson penned the screenplay for the Rocky Jones pilot. By the end of 1951, a cast had been selected, headed by Richard Crane as Rocky Jones and one-time Our Gang member Scotty Beckett, as Rocky’s co-pilot and comic relief, Winky. The pilot was filmed between January and April 1952 with the titles and effects shots being prepared in March of that year. The outdoor scenes were filmed at Palomar Mountain Observatory. Post-production was completed in May.

The pilot was screened on September 29, 1952. Although the premise showed potential, several characters were recast, including Vena Ray and Secretary Drake. With the new cast finally in place and teleplays prepared for the first 26 episodes, filming began in October 1953 and continued until April 1954. A merchandising blitz began during this time. Wristwatches, wallets complete with space dollars, badges, buttons, records, and clothing were produced to promote the show. A Rocky Jones, Space Ranger comic book was issued by Charlton Comics. Issues 15, 16, 17, and 18 of the ongoing title Space Adventures are devoted to Rocky's adventures. Rocky, Winky, Vena, Bobby, and Cleolanta appear prominently. The largest sponsor of the series was the Gordon Baking Company, makers of Silvercup Bread, the original sponsor of the Lone Ranger radio and television series.

After airing in various markets since October, 1953, the series premiered in Los Angeles on KNXT on January 7, 1954 and then began appearing more widely on Monday, February 22, 1954, at various days and times on additional stations across the United States. Off-screen issues began almost immediately. In February 1954, Scotty Beckett was arrested for possessing a weapon after being implicated in an armed robbery at the Cavalier Hotel in Hollywood. After posting bail, he fled to Mexico where he encountered more problems for writing bad checks and more weapons charges. After a gun battle with local police, he was incarcerated for four months, and did not return to the United States until September 1954. By then, the character of Winky had been written out of the show.

After filming of the initial 26 episodes ended, Maurice Cass (Professor Newton) died of a heart attack on June 8, 1954. An additional 13 episodes were ordered, and filming took place between August and October 1954. Winky was replaced by a new character, Biffen Cardoza (James Lydon), and Professor Newton was replaced by Professor Mayberry (Reginald Sheffield), while regular villain Cleolanta, Suzerain of Ophiucius (Patsy Parsons) was replaced by Juliandra, Suzerain of Herculon (Ann Robinson). No further episodes were ordered, and the series ended after 39 episodes. (Several researchers have stated that this may have been due to the high cost of the special effects, which apparently made the series unprofitable, especially since the show was syndicated, rather than being broadcast by a major network.) Today, all 39 episodes of the TV series are available for viewing on YouTube.

== Episodes ==
Thirty-nine 30-minute episodes were filmed and shown during the period starting in February, 1954, and running into January, 1955, depending on the local market schedule. Thirty-six of these were grouped into 12 three-chapter, 90-minute, story arcs, and three were completed in a single, 30-minute episode each. Most of the three-chapter story arcs were edited into feature-length movies for television, and of those some were renamed (see guide below):

Episode Broadcast Guide
Story name	Chapters	First chapter air date	Alternate title
"Beyond the Curtain of Space"	3	February 23, 1954	"Beyond the Moon"
"Rocky's Odyssey"	3	March 16, 1954	"Gypsy Moon"
"Bobby's Comet"	3	April 6, 1954	"Menace from Outer Space"
"Escape Into Space"	1	April 27, 1954	
"The Pirates of Prah"	3	May 4, 1954	"Manhunt in Space"
"Silver Needle in the Sky"	3	May 25, 1954	"Duel in Space"
"The Forbidden Moon"	3	June 16, 1954	"Forbidden Moon"
"Crash of Moons"	3	July 6, 1954	
"Kip's Private War"	1	July 27, 1954	
"Blast-Off"	3	August 3, 1954	
"The Cold Sun"	3	August 24, 1954	
"Inferno in Space"	3	September 14, 1954	"The Magnetic Moon"
"Vena and the Darnamo"	1	October 5, 1954	
"Out of This World"	3	October 12, 1954	"Robot of Regalio"
"The Trial of Rocky Jones"	3	November 2, 1954	"Renegade Satellite"

== See also ==
- Space Cadet, the 1948 science fiction novel by Robert A. Heinlein
