= They Wanted to Marry =

1937 American film directed by Lew Landers

- Directed by: Lew Landers
- Screenplay by: Paul Yawitz; Ethel B. Borden
- Story by: Larry Bachmann; Daniel L. Teilhet
- Produced by: Samuel J. Briskin; Zion Myers
- Starring: Betty Furness; Gordon Jones
- Cinematography: Russell Metty
- Edited by: Desmond Marquette
- Music by: Roy Webb
- Production company: RKO Radio Pictures
- Distributed by: RKO
- Release date: February 5, 1937 (US)
- Running time: 60 minutes
- Country: United States
- Language: English

They Wanted to Marry is a 1937 romantic comedy film directed by Lew Landers from a screenplay by Paul Yawitz and Ethel Borden, based on a story by Larry Bachmann and Daniel L. Teilhet. RKO Radio Pictures produced and distributed the film, releasing it on February 5, 1937. The picture stars Betty Furness and Gordon Jones.

== Cast ==
- Gordon Jones as Jim
- Betty Furness as Sheila
- E.E. Clive as Stiles
- Patsy Parsons as Patsy (as Patsy Lee Parsons)
- Henry Kolker as Mr. Hunter
- Frank M. Thomas as Detective
- Charles C. Wilson as Clark (as Charles Wilson)
- William 'Billy' Benedict as Freckles (as William Benedict)
- Diana Gibson as Helen
