= John Banner =

Austrian-American actor (1910–1973)

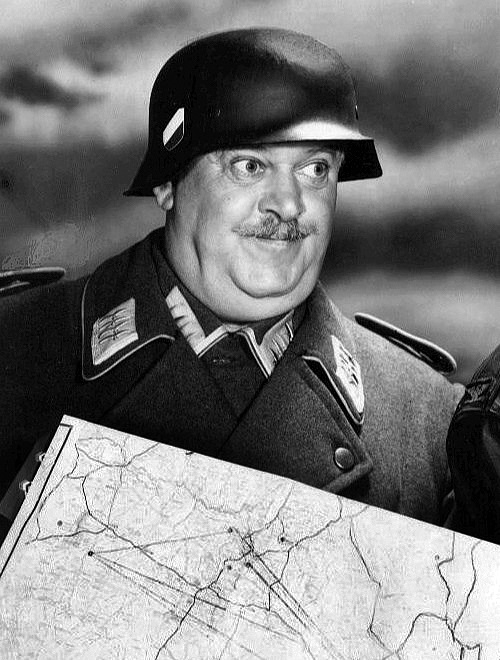
- Banner as Sergeant Schultz on Hogan's Heroes, 1965
- Born: Johann Banner; January 28, 1910; Stanislau, Austria-Hungary
- Died: January 28, 1973 (aged 63); Vienna, Austria
- Resting place: Friedhof Mauer, Vienna, Austria
- Occupation: Actor
- Years active: 1939–1972
- Spouse(s): Elizabeth Johanna Josefine Julie Raudnitz, Christine Gemmene (m. 1965, died)

John Banner (born Johann Banner, January 28, 1910 – January 28, 1973) was an Austrian-born American actor, best known for his role as Sergeant Schultz in the situation comedy Hogan's Heroes (1965–1971). Schultz, constantly encountering evidence that inmates of his stalag were actively conducting anti-German espionage and sabotage activities, frequently feigned ignorance with the catchphrase, "I see nothing! I hear nothing! I know nothing!" (or, more commonly as the series went on, "I know nothing, nothing!").

== Early years ==
Banner was born on January 28, 1910, to Jewish parents in Stanislau, Austria-Hungary (now Ivano-Frankivsk, Ukraine). He studied for a law degree at the University of Vienna, but decided instead to become an actor. In 1938, when he was performing with an acting troupe in Switzerland, Adolf Hitler annexed Austria to Nazi Germany. Banner emigrated to the United States, where he rapidly learned English. He married Elizabeth Raudnitz in Los Angeles, California on October 11, 1940.

== World War II ==
In 1942, Banner enlisted in the United States Army Air Forces, underwent basic training in Atlantic City and became a supply sergeant. He even posed for a recruiting poster. He served until 1945.

According to fellow Hogan's Heroes actor Robert Clary, who was a Holocaust survivor himself, "John lost a lot of his family" to the Holocaust.

== Acting ==
=== Broadway ===
Banner appeared on Broadway three times: in a musical revue called From Vienna, which ran for two months in 1939; and in two comic plays, Pastoral, in which he had a leading role, but which had a very brief run in November 1939; and The Big Two, which ran briefly in January 1947. Early on, before he became fluent in English, Banner had to learn his lines phonetically.

=== Films ===
Banner appeared in more than 40 feature films. His first credited role was a German captain in Once Upon a Honeymoon (1942), starring Cary Grant and Ginger Rogers. He also played a Gestapo agent in 20th Century Fox's Chetniks! The Fighting Guerrillas (1943). His typecasting did not please him, but these were the only roles he was offered. Banner later learned that his family members who remained in Vienna had all perished in Nazi concentration camps.

=== From the 1950s ===
Banner made more than 70 television appearances between 1950 and 1970, including the Lone Ranger (episode "Damsels In Distress", 1950), Sky King (premiere episode "Operation Urgent", 1952), Sheena, Queen of the Jungle ("The Renegades", 1955), Adventures of Superman ("The Man Who Made Dreams Come True", 1957), Father Knows Best ("Brief Holiday", 1957), Mister Ed (episode "Ed the Artist", 1965), Thriller (episode "Portrait Without a Face", 1961), The Untouchables ("Takeover", 1962), My Sister Eileen, The Lucy Show, Perry Mason, The Partridge Family, Voyage to the Bottom of the Sea ("Hot Line", 1964), Alias Smith and Jones, The Man from U.N.C.L.E. ("The Neptune Affair", 1964), and Hazel ("The Investor", 1965).

In the late 1950s, a still-slim Banner portrayed Peter Tchaikovsky's supervisor on a Disneyland anthology series about the composer's life. This followed a scene with fellow Hogan's Heroes actor Leon Askin (General Burkhalter) as Nikolai Rubinstein. In 1953, he had a bit part in the Kirk Douglas feature film The Juggler as the witness of an attack on an Israeli policeman by a disturbed concentration camp survivor.

In 1954, he had a regular role playing Bovarro in the children's science-fiction TV series Rocky Jones, Space Ranger. Two years later, he played a train conductor in the episode "Safe Conduct" of Alfred Hitchcock Presents, appearing with future co-star Werner Klemperer, (Colonel Klink in Hogan's Heroes), who played a spy. He also played Nazi villains in several later films - the German town mayor in The Young Lions (1958), Rudolf Höss in Operation Eichmann (1961, opposite Werner Klemperer as Adolf Eichmann), and Gregor Strasser in Hitler (1962). The year before the premiere of Hogan's Heroes, Banner portrayed a World War II German "home guard" soldier in 36 Hours (1964), starring James Garner. Although it was a serious role in a war drama, Banner still displayed some of the affable nature that became his defining character trait the following year in Hogan's Heroes. By coincidence, during the final moments of 36 Hours, John Banner's character meets up with a border guard played by Sig Ruman, who had portrayed another prisoner-of-war camp chief guard named Sergeant Schulz in the 1953 film Stalag 17, starring William Holden.

==== Hogan's Heroes ====
The comedy series Hogan's Heroes, in which Banner played Sergeant Hans Schultz, the role for which he is most often remembered, debuted on the CBS Television Network in 1965. According to Banner, before he met and married his French wife Christine Gemenne on June 19, 1965, he weighed 178 pounds (81 kg); he claimed her good cooking was responsible for his weight gain to 260 pounds (120 kg), which helped him land the part. The character of Schultz is a bumbling, but ultimately lovable, German guard at a World War II prisoner-of-war camp. The camp is used by the prisoners as a secret staging area for sabotage and intelligence gathering. To obtain nuggets of information from the commandant's office, the prisoners often bribe Schultz with food and candy. Schultz's main goal is to avoid any trouble with his superiors, which often leads him to ignore the clandestine activities of the prisoners. (On those occasions, he often used his catchphrase "I hear nothing, I see nothing, I know nothing!" As the series went on, this became simply "I know nothing. Nothing!") The genesis of the line could be from Banner’s appearance on the TV crime drama The Untouchables, in the episode "The Takeover" (1961), when confronted by a gangster, he nervously responds with his future classic line. Another signature phrase used was "Jolly joker!", when one of the POWs would make a joke at his expense. Schultz's gentle nature is exemplified by his occupation before the war: he was owner of Germany's largest toy company.

Banner was loved not only by the viewers, but also by the cast, as recalled by cast members during the Hogan's Heroes DVD commentary. The Jewish Banner defended his character, telling TV Guide in 1967, "Schultz is not a Nazi. I see Schultz as the representative of some kind of goodness in any generation." Banner appeared in every episode of the series, which ran for six years.

In 1968, during the series' run, Banner co-starred with fellow Hogan's Heroes actors Werner Klemperer, Leon Askin, and Bob Crane in the Cold War comedy The Wicked Dreams of Paula Schultz, starring Elke Sommer in the title role.

==== After Hogan's Heroes ====
After Hogan's Heroes was cancelled in 1971, Banner starred as the inept gangster Uncle Latzi in a short-lived television situation comedy, The Chicago Teddy Bears. His last acting appearance was in the March 17, 1972, episode of The Partridge Family. He then retired to France with his Paris-born second wife.

== Death ==
Banner died on January 28, 1973 – his 63rd birthday – following a burst abdominal aortic aneurysm hemorrhage. At the time of his death, he was visiting friends in Vienna.

== Filmography ==
=== Film ===
Year	Title	Role	Notes
1940	Spring Parade	Cymbalist	Uncredited
1941	Accent on Love	Austrian Tenant	Uncredited
1941	It Started with Eve	Party Guest	Uncredited
1941	Pacific Blackout	Unknown character	Uncredited
1942	Desperate Journey	Conductor on Empty Troop Train	Uncredited
1942	Once Upon a Honeymoon	German Captain Von Kleinoch	
1942	Seven Miles from Alcatraz	Fritz Weinermann	
1943	Immortal Sergeant	Officer	Uncredited
1943	Chetniks! The Fighting Guerrillas	Gestapo Agent	Uncredited
1943	The Moon Is Down	Lieutenant Prackle	Uncredited
1943	Tonight We Raid Calais	Kurz	Uncredited
1943	They Came to Blow Up America	Gestapo Agent	Uncredited
1943	This Land Is Mine	German Sergeant	Uncredited
1943	The Fallen Sparrow	Anton	
1946	Tangier	Ferris Wheel Operator	Uncredited
1946	Rendezvous 24	Ernst	Uncredited
1946	Nocturne	Charles Shawn	Uncredited
1947	The Beginning or the End	German Laboratory Assistant	Uncredited
1948	My Girl Tisa	Otto	
1948	To the Victor	Jacques Lestrac	
1948	The Argyle Secrets	Winter	
1950	Guilty of Treason	Dr. Szandor Deste	
1950	King Solomon's Mines	Austin – Safari Client	Uncredited
1951	Go for Broke!	German Officer	Uncredited
1951	The Star Said No	Headwaiter at Mocambo's	Uncredited
1953	The Juggler	Emile Halevy	
1954	Crash of Moons	Bavarro	
1954	Executive Suite	Henri (Stork Club Maître D')	Uncredited
1955	The Rains of Ranchipur	Rashid Ali Khan	Uncredited
1956	Never Say Goodbye	Oskar, the Baker	
1956	The Power and the Prize	Mr. Ruloff	Uncredited
1958	The Beast of Budapest	Dr. Kovach	
1958	The Young Lions	German Town Mayor	Uncredited
1958	Fräulein	Ulick, German Health Department	Uncredited
1959	The Blue Angel	Principal Harter	
1959	The Wonderful Country	Ben Sterner	
1960	The Story of Ruth	King of Moab	
1961	Operation Eichmann	Rudolf Höss	
1961	20,000 Eyes	Kurt Novak	
1961	One, Two, Three	Krause / Haberdrasher	Voice
1962	Hitler	Gregor Strasser	
1962	The Counterfeit Traitor		Uncredited
1962	The Interns	Dr. Duane	
1963	The Yellow Canary	Sam Skolman	
1963	The Prize	German Correspondent	Uncredited
1964	Bedtime Story	Burgermeister	Uncredited
1964	Kisses for My President	Vasiliovich Alexminitch	Uncredited
1965	36 Hours	Sergeant Ernst Furzen	
1968	The Wicked Dreams of Paula Schultz	Weber	
1968	Star Spangled Salesman	Chef	Short
1970	Togetherness	Hipolitas Mollnar	

=== Television ===
Year	Title	Role	Episode(s)
1950	The Lone Ranger	Von Baden	"Damsels in Distress"
1954	Cavalcade of America	Unknown character	"Plume of Honor"
1954	The Public Defender	Mr. Lambert	Two episodes
1954	Rocky Jones, Space Ranger	Bovaro	Six episodes
1954	Adventures of the Falcon	Coldroski	"A Very Dangerous Bedfellow"
1954	The Whistler	Van Loovan	"Fatal Fraud"
1954–1955	Fireside Theatre	Joe / Josef Novak / Amos	Five episodes
1954–1955	Captain Midnight	Van Ronk / Goronov	Two episodes
1955	Schlitz Playhouse of Stars	Morris Odvarka	"The Cool One"
1955	Topper	Ali / Henri	Two episodes
1955	Damon Runyon Theater	Sergeant Heinz	"The Lacework Kid"
1955	The Adventures of Ellery Queen	Buehler	"Night Visitors"
1955–1956	NBC Matinee Theater	Unknown characters	Two episodes
1956	Sheena, Queen of the Jungle	Brunner	"The Renegades"
1956	Jungle Jim	Wilhelm Camphausen	"Wild Man of the Jungle"
1956	Alfred Hitchcock Presents	Train Conductor	Season 1 Episode 21: "Safe Conduct"
1956	Private Secretary	Sandor	"Cat in the Hot Tin File"
1956	Screen Directors Playhouse	Prefect of Police	"The Dream"
1956	You Are There	Nazi News Dealer	"Hitler Invades Poland (September 1, 1939)"
1956	The Adventures of Hiram Holliday	Count Courtebiche	"Monaco Hermit Crab"
1956	Navy Log	Unknown character	"The Pilot"
1957	The Gray Ghost	Major Von Borcke	"An Eye for an Eye"
1957	Father Knows Best	Artist	"Brief Holiday"
1957	Conflict	Unknown character	"Blind Drop: Warsaw"
1957	The Gale Storm Show	Hans Schlosser	"Swiss Miss"
1957	The Lineup	Unknown character	"The Bay Meadows Case"
1957	Letter to Loretta	Hans	"Louise"
1957	Adventures of Superman	Bronsky	"The Man Who Made Dreams Come True"
1958	Studio 57	Unknown character	"A Source of Irritation"
1958	Telephone Time	Unknown character	"War Against War"
1958	Man Without a Gun	Max Brenner	"Headline"
1958	Cimarron City	P. B. Minscher	"I, the People"
1958	The Adventures of Rin Tin Tin	Baron Carlisle	"Grandpappy's Love Affair"
1958	Behind Closed Doors	Prosecutor Hoxa	"A Cover of Art"
1959	Shotgun Slade	Corneilus	"Barbed Wire Keep Out"
1959	Walt Disney's Disneyland	Office Supervisor	"The Peter Tchaikovsky Story"
1959	The Third Man	Steiner	"Castle in Spain"
1960	This Is the Life	Carl Brandt	"Red Tape"
1960	Alcoa Presents: One Step Beyond	Dr. Molhaus	"The Peter Hurkos Story: Part 1"
1960	Markham	Police Commissioner Langres	"The Cruelest Thief"
1960	My Sister Eileen	Unknown character	"Ruth Becomes a Waitress"
1960	The Roaring 20's	Otto Bauer	"The Velvet Frame"
1960	Michael Shayne	Dr. Hess	"The Poison Pen Club"
1960	Perry Mason	A. Tobler	"The Case of the Nine Dolls"
1960	Dante	Baron Von Zenger	"The Bavarian Barbarians"
1960	77 Sunset Strip	Carl Neuman	"The Antwerp Caper"
1960	The DuPont Show with June Allyson	Popper	"Silent Panic"
1960	Five Fingers	Saphani	"Final Dream"
1960–1963	The Many Loves of Dobie Gillis	Chief / Dr. Otto von Schwering	Two episodes
1961	Thriller	Professor Martin Vander Hoven	"Portrait Without a Face"
1962	Outlaws	Wint	"The Dark Sunrise of Griff Kincaid"
1962	The Untouchables	Franz Koenig	"Takeover"
1962	The Dick Powell Show	Vandever	"Safari"
1963	The Wide Country	The Doctor	"The Quest for Jacob Blaufus"
1963	GE True	Hipp	"Black Market"
1963	Theatre of Stars	General	"Four Kings"
1963	The Donna Reed Show	Cruikshank	"Moon Shot"
1963–1964	The Virginian	August the Head Waiter / Gus Schultz	Two episodes
1964	Dr. Kildare	Mr. Schultz	"Goodbye, Mr. Jersey"
1964	The Alfred Hitchcock Hour	Dutch Customs Inspector	Season 2 Episode 19: "Murder Case"
1964	My Three Sons	Chief of Protocol	"What's the Princess Really Like?"
1964	The Lucille Ball Comedy Hour	Guard	Special
1964	Voyage to the Bottom of the Sea	Russian Chairman	"Hot Line"
1964	The Man from U.N.C.L.E.	Dr. Foster	"The Neptune Affair"
1964	The Cara Williams Show	Zinzer	"Cara, Girl Genius"
1964	The Rogues	Steiner / Fat Man	Two episodes
1964–1965	The Baileys of Balboa	Hans	Five episodes
1965	Hazel	Mr. Mueller	"The Investor"
1965	Mister Ed	Professor Meyerhoff	"Ed the Artist"
1965	Kraft Suspense Theatre	Martin Rutke	"The Safe House"
1965–1971	Hogan's Heroes	Sergeant Hans Georg Schultz / Wolfgang Brauner	168 episodes
1966	The Lucy Show	Sergeant Schultz	"Lucy and Bob Crane"
1967	The Red Skelton Show	Sergeant Schultz	"Freddie's Heroes"
1971	The Chicago Teddy Bears	Uncle Latzi	13 episodes
1972	The Doris Day Show	Bruno	"The Crapshooter Who Would Be King"
1972	Alias Smith and Jones	Otto	"Don't Get Mad, Get Even"
1972	The Partridge Family	Max Ledbetter	"Who Is Max Ledbetter and Why Is He Saying All Those Terrible Things?" (final appearance)
