= Florence Jaffray Harriman =

American diplomat

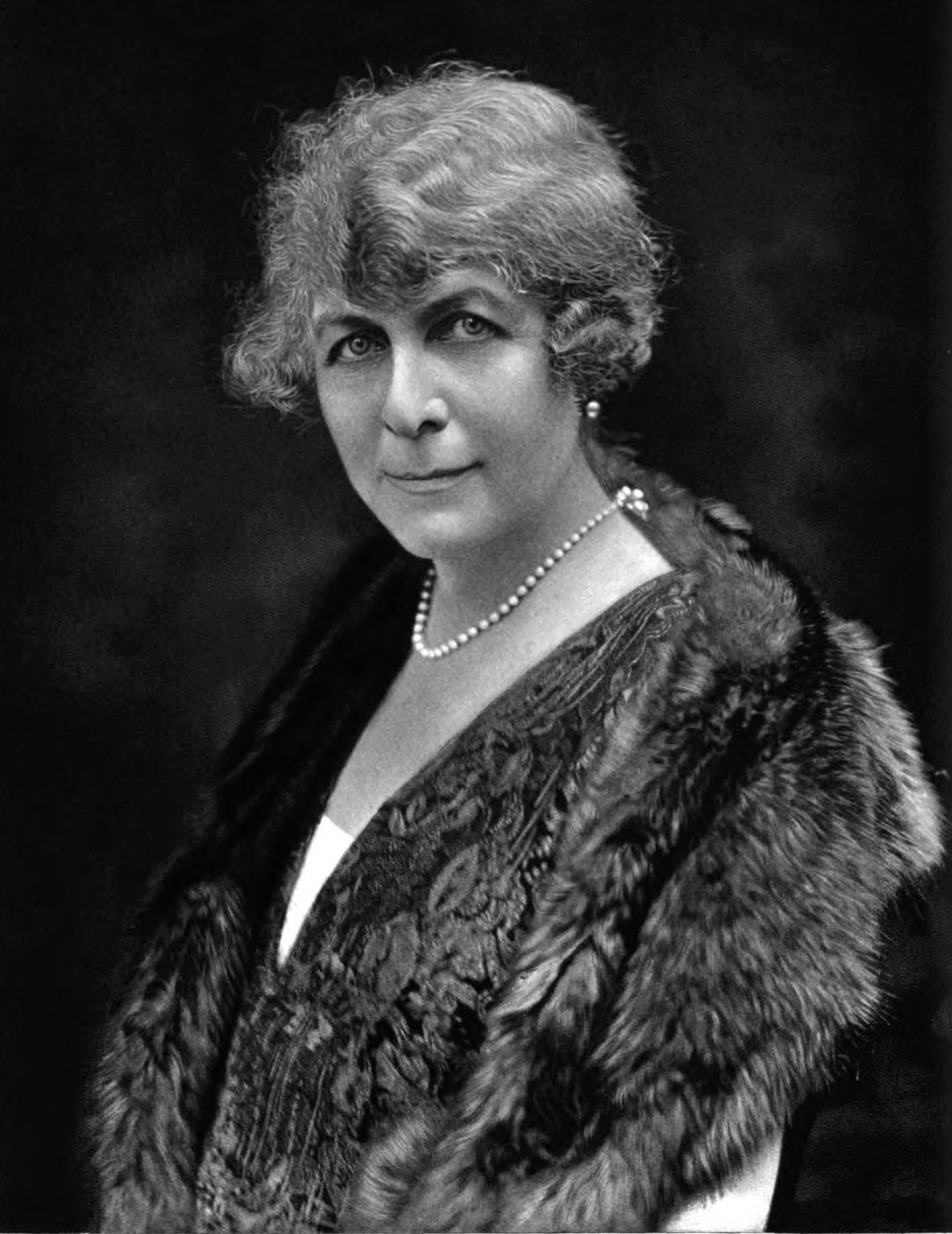

8th United States Minister to Norway
- In office July 1, 1937 – April 22, 1940
- President: Franklin D. Roosevelt
- Preceded by: Anthony Drexel Biddle
- Succeeded by: Anthony Drexel Biddle

Personal details
- Born: Florence Jaffray Hurst; July 21, 1870 New York City, New York, U.S.
- Died: August 31, 1967 (aged 97) Georgetown, D.C., U.S.
- Party: Democratic
- Spouse: J. Borden Harriman (m. 1889; died 1914)
- Children: Ethel Harriman
- Profession: Suffragist; Social reformer Diplomat

Florence Jaffray "Daisy" Harriman (July 21, 1870 – August 31, 1967) was an American socialite, suffragist, social reformer, organizer, and diplomat. "She led one of the suffrage parades down Fifth Avenue, worked on campaigns on child labor and safe milk and, as minister to Norway in World War II, organized evacuation efforts while hiding in a forest from the Nazi invasion." In her ninety-second year, U.S. President John F. Kennedy honored her by awarding her the first "Citation of Merit for Distinguished Service." She often found herself in the middle of historic events. As she stated, "I think nobody can deny that I have always had through sheer luck a box seat at the America of my times."

== Early life and family ==
Harriman was born Florence Jaffray Hurst on July 21, 1870, in New York City to Civil War blockade runner and shipping magnate F. W. J. Hurst and his wife Caroline. In 1871 she became a niece by marriage of Helen Smythe, who married her mother's brother William Phillips Jaffray (1845–1887), a New York dry goods merchant. When she was three years old, her mother, then 29, died. She and her two sisters, Caroline Elise and Ethel, were raised in and around New York City by her father and maternal grandparents, Mr. and Mrs. Edward Somerville Jaffray. Aged six, she watched her first political torchlight parade, part of the 1876 presidential campaign. "She later told of leaning over the bannister of her home at 615 Fifth Avenue, to hear visitors such as John Hay, President James A. Garfield, and President Chester A. Arthur."

She was known throughout her life as "Daisy".

Between 1880 and 1888, she received private lessons at the home of financier J. P. Morgan. She also attended the Misses Lockwood's Collegiate School for Girls.

In 1889, at age nineteen, she married J. Borden Harriman, a New York banker, an elder cousin of future cabinet secretary, New York Governor, and diplomat W. Averell Harriman. The list of attendees at their wedding included past and future president Grover Cleveland, railroad tycoons Cornelius Vanderbilt and Edward Harriman, John Jacob Astor IV, and J. P. Morgan. They had one child, Ethel Borden Harriman, born in 1897. Ethel worked on Broadway and in Hollywood, as an actress and writer.

== Socialite ==
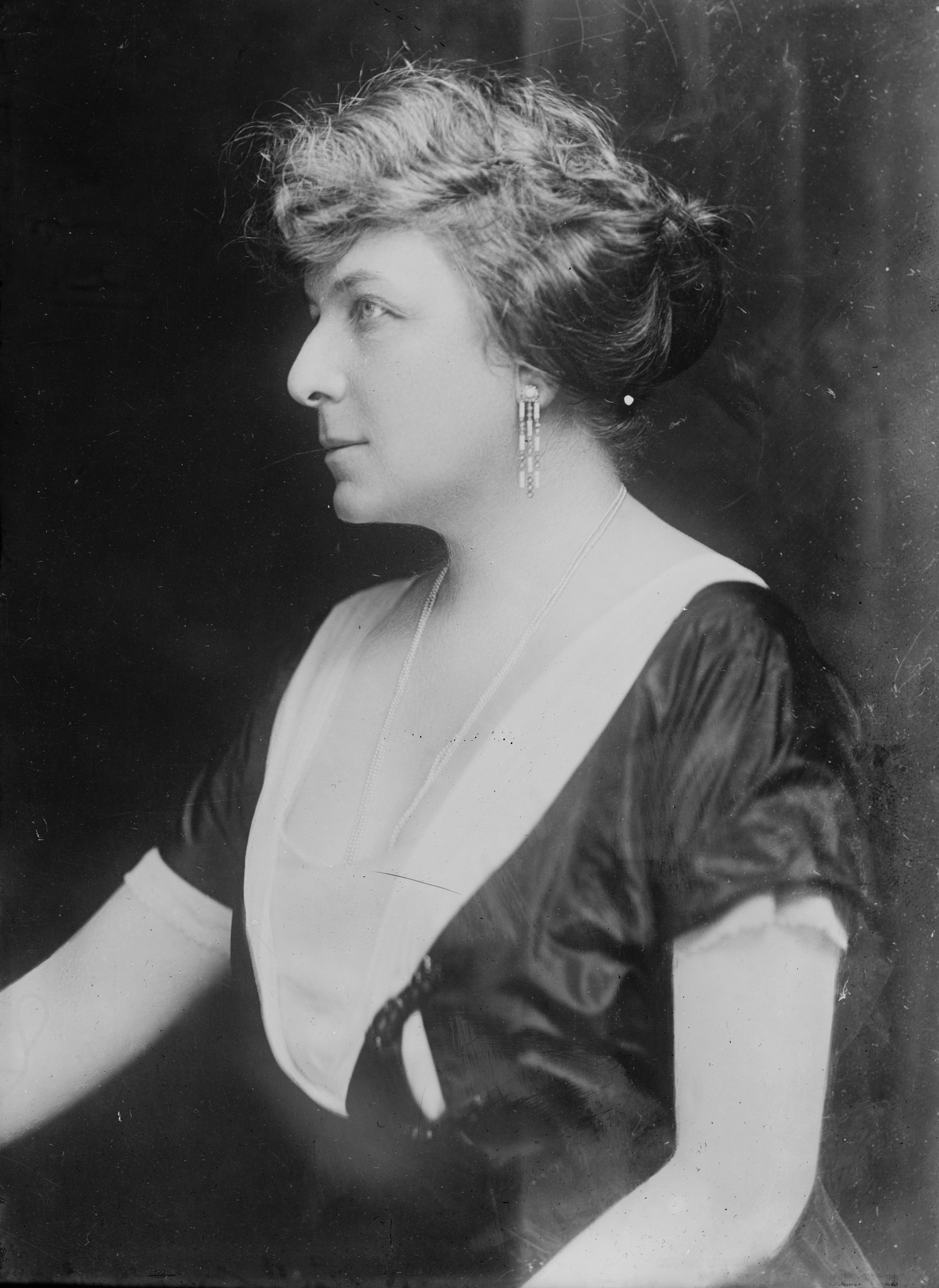
Harriman circa 1910-1915

For many years, Harriman led the life of a young society matron interested in charitable and civic activities. Her life revolved around Mount Kisco, New York, Fifth Avenue in New York City, and Newport, Rhode Island.

In 1903, she co-founded with Ava Lowle Willing and Helen Hay Whitney the Colony Club, New York City's first club exclusively for women. However, instead of restricting her social and civic activities to the wealthy or to members of her husband's political party (the Republican Party), she reached out to others. For example, in 1908, she led efforts by the New York chapter of the National Women's Committee to expose harsh working conditions in New York City's factories, foundries and hotels. She explained, "Should not the woman who spends the money which the employees help to provide take a special interest in their welfare, especially in that of the women wage earners?" In 1909, she created waves when, as the "wife of a banker," she "entertained one hundred members of the International Brotherhood of Stationary Firemen at her summer home." In 1906, Republican Governor Charles Evans Hughes appointed her as a member of the Board of Managers of New York State Reformatory for Women at Bedford, New York.

== Suffragist and social reformer ==
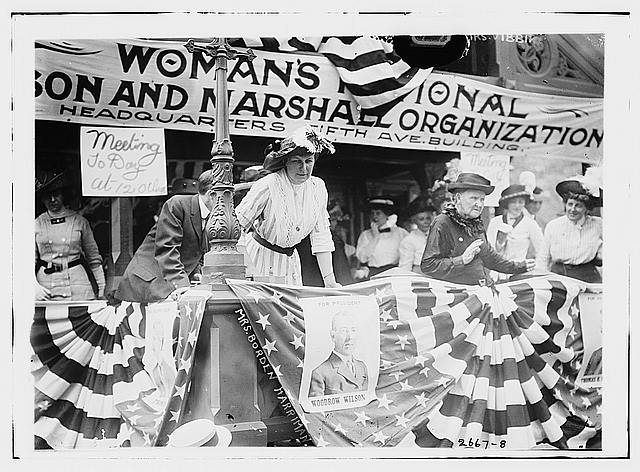
Harriman (in white) oversees a Democratic rally in Union Square, New York City, 1912

As Harriman would later explain in her book From Pinafores to Politics, her leadership and organizing skills became increasingly directed toward the disenfranchised and impoverished. She was active in the women's suffrage movement in support of extending the vote to women, reportedly leading a parade of suffragists down Fifth Avenue. She also crusaded against unhealthy conditions in New York's tenements. Franklin D. Roosevelt later described her as "the woman who was most responsible for helping to provide milk for dependent poor children in the great city of New York."

In 1912, Harriman's active support for the presidential campaign of then-New Jersey Governor Woodrow Wilson led to national publicity and leadership roles. She was elected as the first president of the "Women's National Wilson and Marshall Association," and organized mass meetings, and mass mailings, in support of his campaign.

Upon taking office, Wilson appointed Harriman as a member of the first U.S. Commission on Industrial Relations, which Congress had authorized the previous year. After 154 days of testimony, the Commission could not agree on the causes and solutions to labor-management difficulties. Harriman and Commissioner John R. Commons refused to sign the caustic report written by Commission Chair Frank P. Walsh. As Commons and Harriman wrote in their separate report (joined by a narrow majority of Commissioners), the Walsh report mistakenly focused on individual "scapegoats rather than on the system that produces the demand for scapegoats."

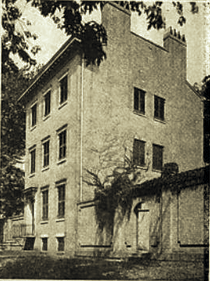
Harriman home in Washington, D.C.

Her husband became seriously ill in February 1913, shortly before Wilson took office. After President Wilson's appointment, Washington, D.C. became their primary residence. While serving on the Commission on Industrial Relations, she also continued to serve in New York on the Bedford Reformatory board.

== World War I and the Mexican Revolution ==
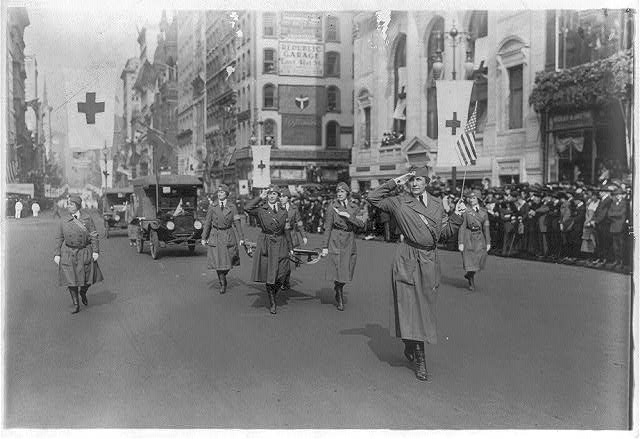
Heading the Washington Ambulance Corps in a Red Cross parade

Harriman, her husband and daughter found themselves in the middle of Europe as World War I erupted in the summer of 1914. Hoping that the healing waters in the Bohemian spa in Karlsbad would benefit her husband, Harriman brought her family to Europe in June 1914. After meeting with leading British and French officials while relations between the European powers deteriorated, they traveled through France to Karlsbad (then a part of Austria-Hungary), and were there when Austria-Hungary attacked Serbia in late July. After leaving Karlsbad on the last train crossing the frontier through Germany to France, they eventually returned to New York on an armed British vessel, the RMS Adriatic. Her husband's health continued to deteriorate, and he died on December 1, 1914. His prolonged illness, the resulting lack of income, and the expense of maintaining several homes had consumed nearly all of his net worth. Harriman never remarried.

The following year, Harriman found herself near the front lines of another war – the battle along the south side of the Rio Grande near Brownsville, Texas, between supporters of rebel Pancho Villa and the armies of Mexican leader Venustiano Carranza. During a break in hearings on working conditions for farmworkers that she conducted in Dallas in March 1915, she accepted an offer to visit the Rio Grande area, where the United States was attempting to remain neutral as Mexican factions battled each other along the river. After watching the battle for Matamoros, Tamaulipas from Brownsville, she began to tend to the wounded and visited the smoking battlefields, before returning to Washington.

Harriman increased her charitable and political activity. She turned her Mount Kisco home into a tuberculosis sanitarium. During the period of American neutrality, she became a cofounder of the Committee of Mercy, which was created to help the women and children and other European noncombatants made destitute by the war. In May 1916 she was recruited by Eleanor Roosevelt to lead a contingent of "Independent Patriotic Women of America" in a preparedness parade. After the United States declared war on Germany, she organized the American Red Cross Women's Motor Corps of the District of Columbia, and directed the Women's Motor Corps in France. From 1917 to 1919, she served as chair of the U.S. National Defense Advisory Commission's Committee on Women in Industry.

== 1919 to 1937 ==
Harriman participated in the Versailles Peace Conference, and upon her return was an advocate for American participation in the League of Nations, and worked on behalf of world peace organizations.

While the Wilson Administration ended in 1921, Harriman's Democratic activism did not. Syndicated columnist William Hard described her as "a candle for the party in its darkest days." She began serving as member of the Democratic National Committee in 1920 (a position she would hold until the 1950s) and in 1922 became a founder and the first president of the Woman's National Democratic Club. Her first book, "From Pinafores to Politics," was published in 1923. She was often in the company of another widowed fixture of 1920s Washington, Senator Thomas J. Walsh of Montana. She resided in a large home known as "Uplands," on a hill off Foxhall Road northwest of Georgetown.

Time magazine would report in 1934 that her "Sunday night salons have long been a Washington institution." She would invite up to 32 guests with diverse viewpoints, then referee a thorough off-the-record discussion of a single controversial issue. She enforced two ground rules: no one was ever to grow angry, and no one was to repeat what had been said.

Harriman reportedly "lost most of her fortune during the Depression," and "had to eke out her income by interior decorating and real estate" (while sharing her Washington home with well-paying guests). One such cohabitant in the first year of the Roosevelt Administration was the first woman cabinet member, Secretary of Labor Frances Perkins.

As a member of the Democratic National Committee, Harriman was also a District of Columbia delegate to the Party's conventions. In 1932, when the Convention nominated Franklin D. Roosevelt, Harriman did not support him. According to Time, "she unfortunately held out for Newton D. Baker or Melvin Traylor." In her own words, this would cause "the triumphant members of the Roosevelt-before-the-Convention inner clique" to have "a little grey mark against me." However, "after Roosevelt's nomination she hastened to repair her mistake," and became one of Roosevelt's strongest supporters at the 1936 Convention.

== Diplomacy and World War II ==
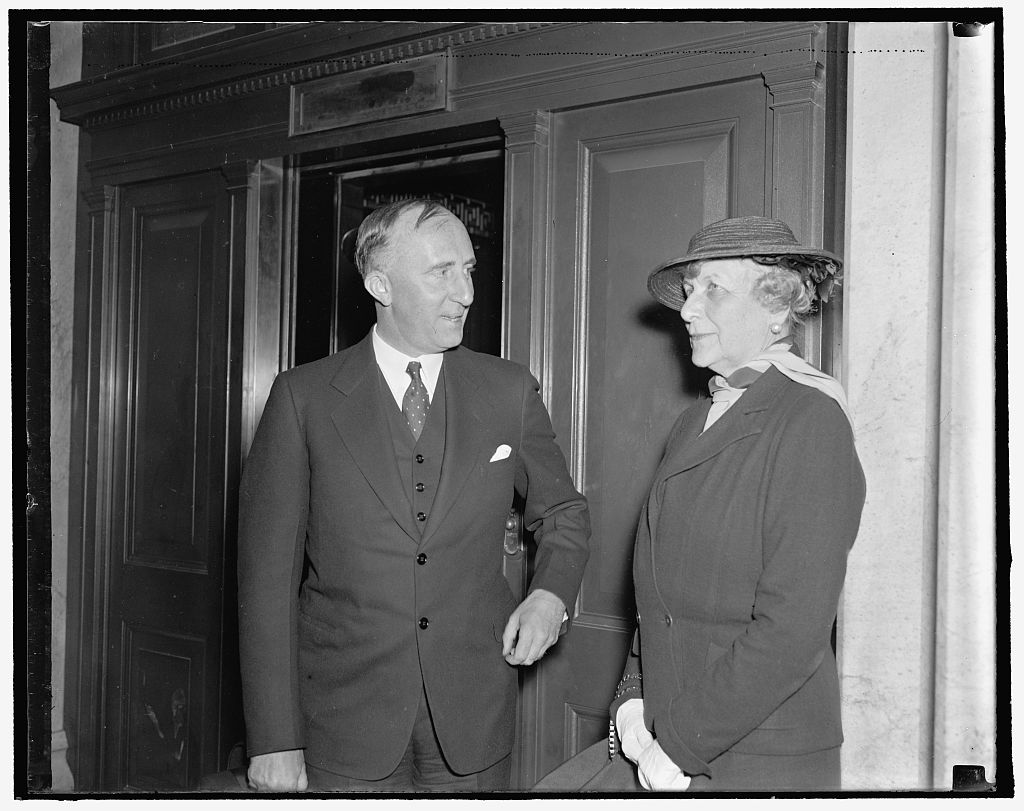
Harriman with Norwegian Ambassador Wilhelm Morgenstierne in 1937

Early in his second term, Roosevelt scrambled many of his diplomatic assignments. Norway, the fourth nation to grant woman suffrage (after New Zealand, Australia and Finland), was considered "an obvious post for a woman diplomat." Thus, in 1937, Harriman was appointed as the United States' Minister to Norway. (Her precise title was "Envoy Extraordinary and Minister Plenipotentiary" for Norway.) At the time of her appointment, she could hardly have known that this role would soon require her to draw on her experience in helping refugees in the previous World War. Consequently, increasing tension in Europe and the imminent death of Turkish reformer Atatürk, compelled her to advise Secretary of State Hull to install Ismet Inonu as President of Turkey to assure a protectionist ally in the region.

In 1940, Germany invaded Norway with little warning, causing Harriman and the rest of the American legation in Norway to join certain members of the Norwegian royal family and other refugees seeking protection hundreds of kilometers away in Sweden. In the chaos and bombardment, America suffered its first military casualty when Captain Robert M. Losey, a U.S. military attaché assisting the evacuation while observing the war, was killed in a Luftwaffe attack on Dombås. The rest of the American legation ultimately arrived safely in Sweden. Harriman is credited with arranging for the safety of other Americans and several members of the Norwegian royal family -- Crown Princess Märtha and her children Ragnhild, Astrid and Harald.

She returned to the Nordic countries to complete the evacuation of current and future U.S. citizens through Finland on the United States Army transport USAT American Legion in August 1940. In January 1941, she officially left her position, became a vice-chair of the Committee to Defend America by Aiding the Allies, and testified in the House Foreign Affairs Committee in favor of the Lend-Lease Act. Her service in Norway, and the harrowing escape, became the subject of her next book, "Mission to the North," published in 1941. In July 1942, King Haakon VII of Norway (then in exile) conferred upon Harriman the Grand Cross of the Order of St. Olav.

After the United States entered World War II, Harriman continued to write on causes important to her, and wrote the foreword to the English-language edition booklet of Natalia Zarembina "Oswiecim, Camp of Death," originally published in occupied Poland in 1942 by the PPS WRN. It was one of the first publications on the Holocaust and Auschwitz Concentration Camp in English language, published in New York City in March 1944 before the camp's liberation by Soviet troops. And despite her decades of involvement in the Democratic Party, she joined a bipartisan (but unsuccessful) effort to persuade Roosevelt's Republican opponent in the 1940 election, Wendell Willkie, to run for Governor of New York in 1942.

In 1952, she campaigned on behalf of her cousin by marriage, W. Averell Harriman, in his unsuccessful run for the Democratic nomination for President.

She served as the 3rd vice president of the board of directors of the National Conference On Citizenship in 1960.

== Voting rights in the District of Columbia ==
Harriman lived in the District of Columbia at the time of every presidential election since the adoption of the Nineteenth Amendment to the United States Constitution in 1920, but the District received no electoral votes for most of her life, so she effectively could not vote in presidential elections for several decades.

In 1955, at age 84, Harriman led a parade through the capital to protest "taxation without representation" in the District of Columbia. That year, she wrote in a New York Times letter to the editor that "the time has come for another Boston tea party" to end the disenfranchisement of the District's residents.

The adoption of the Twenty-third Amendment to the United States Constitution in 1961 gave three electoral votes to the District, so in 1964, at age 94, Harriman cast her first vote in a presidential election – for Lyndon Johnson.

In 1956, Life Magazine reported that, even at age 86, she continued to host dinners for twenty-two guests nearly every Sunday night.

== Citation of Merit ==
Harriman received a Citation of Merit for Distinguished Service, presented by President Kennedy on April 18, 1963 (when she was 92 years old). It states:

In her illustrious career in public service, Mrs. Harriman has made singular and lasting contributions to the cause of peace and freedom. . . . In all of her endeavors, Mrs. Harriman has exemplified the spirit of selflessness, courage and service to the Nation, reflecting the highest credit on herself and on this country. She has, indeed, earned the esteem and admiration of her countrymen and the enduring gratitude of this Republic.

== Death and descendants ==
Harriman died at her home in Georgetown, Washington, D.C., on August 31, 1967. Her daughter died on July 4, 1953, at age 55. Her granddaughter, Phyllis Russell Marcy Darling, of Eugene, Oregon, died on December 18, 2007, at age 88. Her grandson, Charles Howland Russell, of Carmel Valley, California, died on May 13, 1981, at age 60.

== Published works ==
- Harriman, Florence Jaffray Hurst, Examples of Welfare Work in the Cotton Industry: Conditions and Progress : New England and the South, New York: Woman's Dept., National Civic Federation (1910)
- Harriman, Mrs. J. Borden, From Pinafores to Politics, New York: H. Holt and Company (1923)
- Harriman, Florence Jaffray, Mission to the North, Philadelphia: J.B. Lippincott (1941)
- Harriman, Florence Jaffray Hurst, Norway Does Not Yield; The Story of the First Year, New York: American Friends of German Freedom (1941)
- Zarembina, Natalia, and Harriman, Florence Jaffray Hurst, Oswiecim, Camp of Death (Underground Report), New York, N.Y.: "Poland fights," Polish Labor Group (1944)
- Harriman, Florence Jaffray Hurst, The Reminiscences of Mrs. Florence Jaffray Harriman (1972)

== See also ==
- Harriman family
- List of suffragists and suffragettes
- List of peace activists
- Timeline of women's suffrage

Diplomatic posts
Preceded by Anthony J. Drexel Biddle, Jr.	United States Ambassador to Norway; 1937–1940	Succeeded by Anthony J. Drexel Biddle, Jr.
