= Sally Mansfield =

American actress (1923–2001)

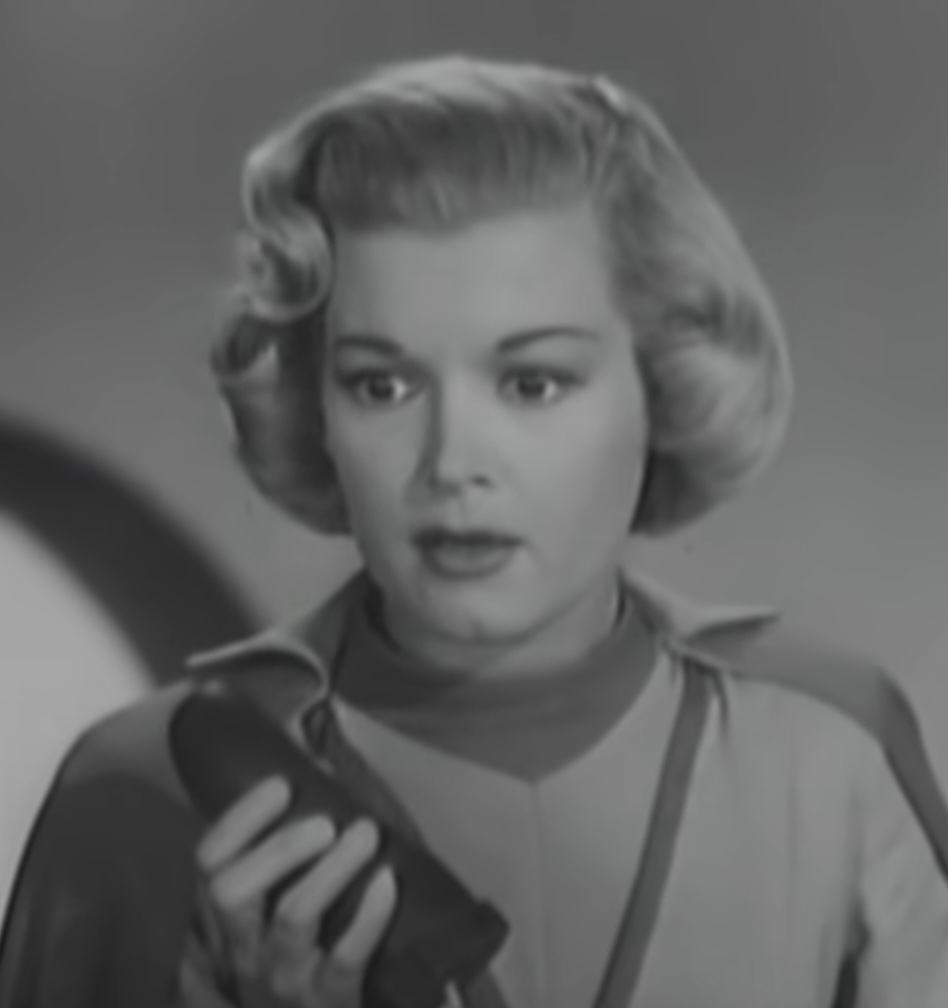
- Mansfield in Crash of Moons (1954)
- Born: Maria Mahder; December 3, 1923; Chicago, Illinois, U.S.
- Died: January 28, 2001 (aged 77); Westlake Village, California, U.S.
- Resting place: Westwood Village Memorial Park Cemetery, Los Angeles
- Occupation: Actress
- Years active: 1953–1965
- Notable work: Rocky Jones, Space Ranger

Maria Mahder (December 3, 1923 – January 28, 2001), better known by her stage name Sally Mansfield, was an American television character actress; she also had a few small roles in feature films including one with Dean Martin and Jerry Lewis.

== Early years ==
Known in her early years as Maria Mahder, Mansfield was the daughter of Mr. and Mrs. Sam Mahder. She was a native of Chicago who graduated from Lindblom High School and attended Northwestern University. She learned about performing at the Actors Company of Chicago, the Children's Summer Theatre in Chicago, and Sherwood Music School. When she was young she acted children's roles in Chicago-based radio programs.

== Career ==
Mansfield's career began in radio in New York City in 1945. She performed on soap operas and other kinds of programs and in commercials.

On stage, Mansfield was a member of the Don Arden Dancers, performing in nightclubs in Las Vegas and around New York. She ventured into motion pictures in 1951, signing with Paramount Pictures. Her films included several Jerry Lewis-Dean Martin productions, Admiral Hoskins Story, Forever Female, Pffftt, and The Leather Saint.

== Television career ==
Mansfield portrayed Connie on Bachelor Father She danced on Milton Berle's, Jack Carter's, Kate Smith's, and Ed Sullivan's television programs. TV shows on which she acted in the 1950s and 1960s included One Man's Family, Lights Out, Studio One, Death Valley Days, The Donna Reed Show, Hazel, The Andy Griffith Show, and The Phil Silvers Show.

She is perhaps best remembered, however, for her 1954 role as spaceship navigator Vena Ray on the syndicated science fiction show Rocky Jones, Space Ranger. She was chosen from 300 who auditioned. Her character anticipated Nichelle Nichols' much more famous role as a female spaceship bridge officer on the 1960s television series Star Trek. The same year Mansfield carried the Miss Emmy torch at the Palladium during the sixth annual Academy of Television Arts & Sciences awards banquet.

Executive Producer, Guy V. Thayer Jr., signed Richard Crane and Mansfield to five-year contracts for Rocky Jones, Space Ranger. One of the contract stipulations was that the still-single Mansfield would not marry and Crane would not divorce his wife of eight years.

== Death ==
Mansfield died of lung cancer in Westlake Village, California on January 28, 2001, at the age of 77. She is interred in Westwood Memorial Park, Los Angeles.

== Selected television roles ==
Year	Title	Role	Notes
1953	Death Valley Days	Dodie Trumbull	Season 2, Episode 2, "Little Washington"
1953	Death Valley Days	Wilhelmina Cannon	Episode, "Sego Lilies"
1961	Bachelor Father	Connie	Episode "The Law and Kelly Gregg"
1962	Bachelor Father	Connie	Episode "Kelly the Yes Man"
1962	Bachelor Father	Connie	Episode "Kelly's Engagement"
