= Patsy Parsons =

American actress

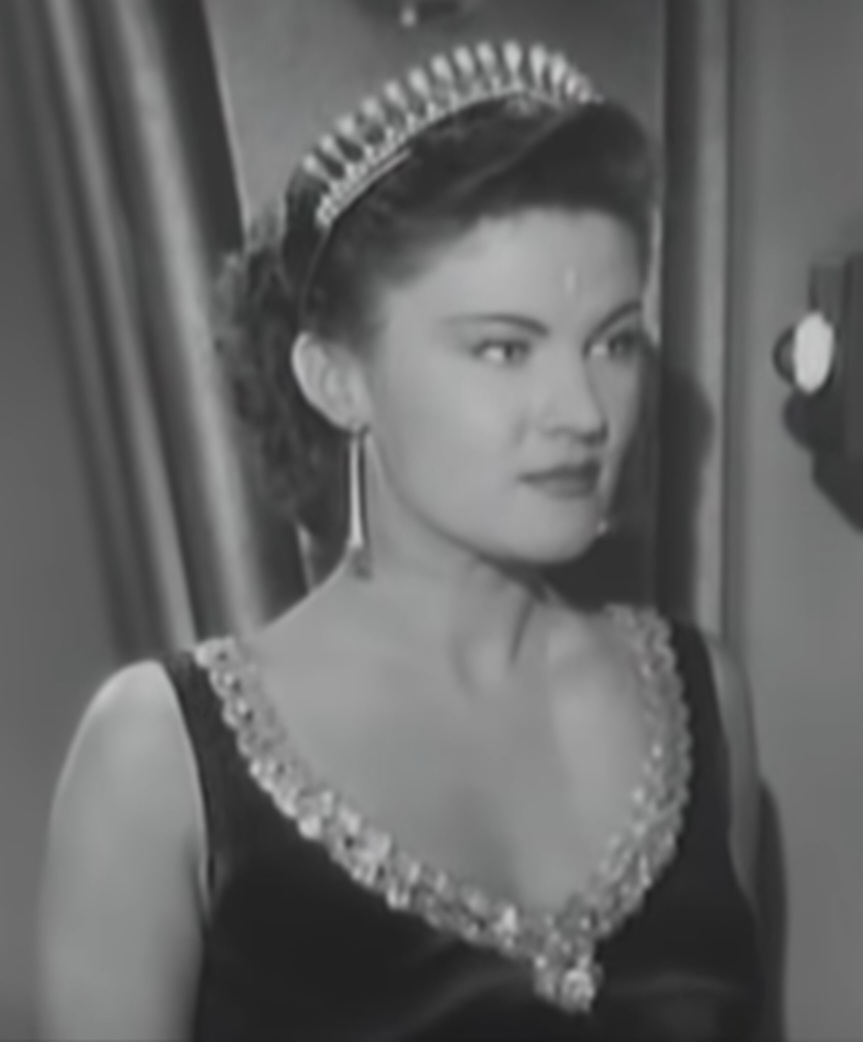
- Parsons in Crash of Moons (1954)
- Born: Patricia Parsons; June 9, 1931
- Died: October 26, 2006 (aged 75)
- Other name: Patsy Lee Parsons
- Occupation: Character actress
- Years active: 1937–1956

Patricia Parsons (June 9, 1931 – October 26, 2006) was an American character actress who appeared in about a dozen films beginning in 1937. She was sometimes credited as Patsy Lee Parsons.

== Biography ==
Parsons's appearance in a benefit show at Madison Square Garden led to a contract with RKO Pictures. She began acting at age 6, and mostly did child roles, notably in Yankee Doodle Dandy (1942). But she is perhaps best remembered for one of her few adult roles, as the evil space tyrant "Cleolanta" on the TV show Rocky Jones, Space Ranger.

Like many former child stars, Parsons had difficulty finding good adult roles. She retired shortly after leaving Rocky Jones, Space Ranger, making one last TV appearance on Science Fiction Theater in 1956. She was still only in her mid-20s when she stopped acting.

Parsons had a busy post-entertainment career in California as the wife of banker and community activist Solon Soteras. As Pat Soteras, she worked at Pepperdine University and raised three children, Alexander, Nickoletta and Anthony. She also wrote a weekly column for The Malibu Times. In her later years, she was most remembered for her work with the Agoura/Oak Park/ Conejo Valley Chamber of Commerce where, as its executive director, she increased membership eightfold.

== Selected filmography ==
Year	Title	Role	Notes
1937	They Wanted to Marry	Patsy	
1937	You Can't Buy Luck	Orphan Girl	Uncredited
1938	Billy the Kid Returns	Miller's 2nd Daughter	Uncredited
1939	The Star Maker	Cookie	
1939	Meet Dr. Christian	Patsy Hewitt	
1940	Heroes of the Saddle	Peggy Bell	
1941	Melody for Three	Nancy Higby	Uncredited
1941	They Meet Again	Susie	
1942	The Affairs of Jimmy Valentine	Marlene Titus	
1942	Yankee Doodle Dandy	Josie Cohan – As a Girl of 12	
1945	Roughly Speaking	Louise Jr. – Ages 12–17	Uncredited
1948	Luxury Liner	Joyce	Uncredited
1953	The Caddy	Girl in Dressing Room	Uncredited
1954	Manhunt in Space	Cleolanta	IMDb
1954	Crash of Moons	Cleolanta	IMDb

== Sources and External links ==
- Patsy Parsons at IMDb
- Patsy Parsons at epguides.com
- Patsy Parsons at The Acorn community newspaper
- Crash of Moons movie review
- Space Hero Files: Rocky Jones, Space Ranger
- Descriptions and credits for Rocky Jones, Space Ranger episodes, and one of the few on-line sources to spell "Cleolanthe" correctly
- Database and cover gallery of Rocky Jones, Space Ranger comics at comics.org
