= USS Banshee (1862) =

Gunboat of the United States Navy

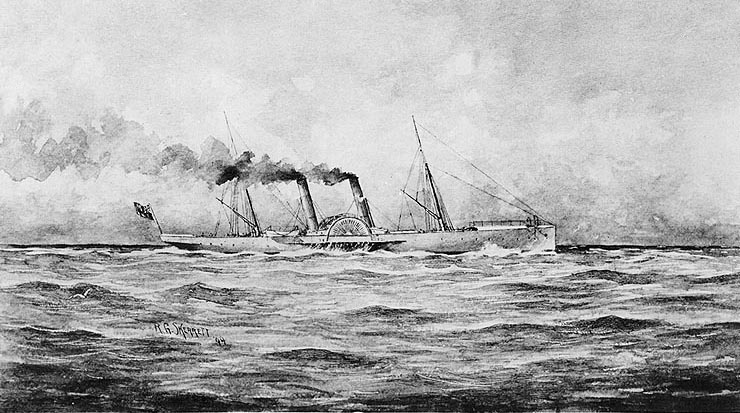
- USS Banshee (1864-1865) Built in 1862, this steamer was the blockade runner Banshee until captured on November 21, 1863.

History

United States
- Name: USS Banshee
- Launched: 1862
- Acquired: 12 March 1864
- Commissioned: 14 June 1864
- Decommissioned: 1865
- Captured: November 21, 1863; by the Union Navy
- Fate: sold November 30, 1865

General characteristics
- Displacement: 273 tons
- Length: 210 ft 4 in (64.11 m)
- Beam: 34 ft 6 in (10.52 m)
- Draft: 20 ft 6 in (6.25 m)
- Propulsion: steam engine, side-wheel propelled
- Speed: 11.5 knots (21.3 km/h; 13.2 mph)
- Range: 3,000 miles
- Capacity: 533 tons
- Armament: one 100-pounder gun; two 30-pounder guns
- Armor: 0.12 in (3 mm) steel plating

USS Banshee was a large steamship "blockade runner" that was captured by the Union Navy and converted to Navy use during the American Civil War.

== Service history ==
Banshee, a 533-ton (burden) side-wheel steamship, was built in Liverpool, England, in 1862 for employment running the Federal blockade of the Confederate coast. Her transatlantic maiden voyage, in April 1863, was a "first" for a steel-hulled ship, though her innovative construction proved troublesome in service. During the next seven months, Banshee was very successful in her intended trade, making seven round-trip voyages between Bermuda or the Bahamas and Wilmington, North Carolina. Future New York shipping magnate F.W.J. Hurst was second in command of the ship on these runs. She was captured by USS Grand Gulf (1863) and the U.S. Army Transport Fulton on November 21, 1863, while en route to Wilmington.

Sent North for adjudication by the New York Prize Court, she was purchased in March 1864 by the U.S. Navy, which converted her to a gunboat and, in June 1864, placed her in commission as USS Banshee. The steamer served for the rest of the year with the North Atlantic Blockading Squadron. In December she took part in the abortive attempt to capture Fort Fisher, North Carolina. Banshee was reassigned to the Potomac Flotilla in mid-January 1865 and spent the rest of the Civil War operating on the Chesapeake Bay and its tributaries. Decommissioned after the fighting ended, Banshee was sold in November 1865. Her new owners placed her in commercial service under the name T.L. Smallwood (or J.L. Smallwood). Sold to British interests in 1867, she was renamed Irene and remained in use at least until the 1890s.
