= Maurice Cass =

American actor (1884–1954)

- Cass in 1915
- Born: October 12, 1884; Vilna, Russian Empire
- Died: June 8, 1954 (aged 69); Hollywood, California, U.S.
- Resting place: Forest Lawn Memorial Park, Glendale, California, U.S.
- Occupation: Actor
- Years active: 1932–1954
- Spouse: Fay Elaine Geffen (m. 1910)

Maurice Cass (October 12, 1884 – June 8, 1954) was an American character actor on stage and in films and television shows.

== Early life ==
Born in Vilna, Russian Empire (modern day Vilnius, Lithuania) he moved to America at six years of age. When he was 17, he toured the southern United States with a repertory company.

== Career ==
His slight build, frizzy hair and pince-nez glasses cast him as the "absent minded professor" or eccentric scientist type in many of his films, such as the character who discovers the element kryptonite in Adventures of Superman.

He is best remembered for his role as Professor Newton in the 1954 TV science fiction show Rocky Jones, Space Ranger, which later was produced as a film Manhunt in Space.

Cass's Broadway credits included The Sky's the Limit (1934), Broadway Boy (1932), Wild Waves (1932), Wonder Boy (1931), Overture (1930), The Violet and One, Two, Three (1930), The Novice and the Duke (1929), The Broken Chain (1929), and Faust (1928).

== Personal life ==
He married Fay Elaine Geffen in 1910.

== Death ==
He died of a heart attack at age 69, he is interred in Forest Lawn Memorial Park (Glendale) in Glendale, California.

== Selected filmography ==
- Two for Tonight (1935)
- Arbor Day (1936)
- Charlie Chan at the Opera (1936) (Stage Manager—Mr. Arnold)
- Wife, Doctor and Nurse (1937) - Pompout
- Women of Glamour (1937)
- She Had to Eat (1937)
- The Lady Escapes (1937)
- Exiled to Shanghai (1937)
- The Jones Family in Big Business (1937)
- The Lone Wolf in Paris (1938)
- Josette (1938)
- The Baroness and the Butler (1938)
- Second Fiddle (1939)
- Rose of Washington Square (1939)
- Sunset Trail (1939)
- Pier 13 (1940)
- Her Lucky Night (1945)
- Paris Underground (1945)
- She Gets Her Man (1945)
- High Conquest (1947)
- Once More, My Darling (1949)
- The Go-Getter (1956)
