= Orbit Jet =

Fictional spaceship

- First appearance: 1954

Information
- Affiliation: Office of Space Affairs; Earth

General characteristics
- Registry: XV-2
- Armaments: Missiles
- Defences: Cloaking device
- Propulsion: Rocket engines
- Chassis: Winged V-2-shaped tail-sitter

The Orbit Jet was a fictional spaceship in the 1954 TV series Rocky Jones, Space Ranger. It strongly resembled a V-2 rocket in overall form, with a very prominent exhaust plume when flying, but had wings in addition to tail fins (even its radio call sign, "XV-2" relates it to that seminal World War II design). There were references in the dialog to the engines being "atomic". The Orbit Jet had a crew of two (pilot and copilot), but often had three or four others on board depending on the mission and destination. It often flew from Earth to inhabited moons of Jupiter and Saturn, which it seemed to reach in hours or days of time within the story.

Later in the series, another ship, the Silver Moon, was used, but it appeared almost identical to the Orbit Jet.

The Orbit Jet introduced many features that would become standard equipment on later TV and movie spaceships:

- An electronic viewscreen (instead of a simple window or porthole)
- A fantastically complicated control panel (without an airplane-styled control wheel or stick)
- Power doors opening side-to-side as one approaches
- Subspace radio (the "Astrophone") that allowed instantaneous communications over interplanetary distances
- Artificial gravity as an explained feature and plot element
- Tractor beams
- Personal communicators (very similar to the pen communicators used later on The Man From U.N.C.L.E.)
- A cloaking device that rendered the ship invisible.
