= F. W. J. Hurst =

British businessman (1840–1902)

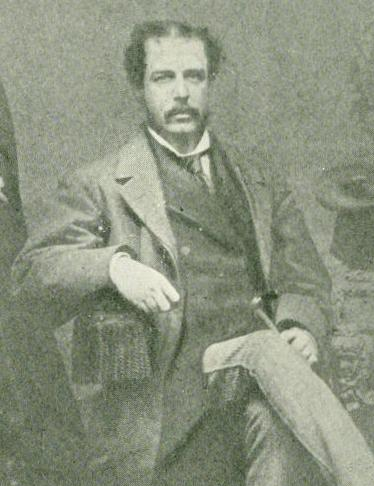
- Hurst c. 1868
- Born: Francis William Jones Hurst; February 13, 1840; St. John's, Antigua and Barbuda
- Died: July 21, 1902 (aged 62); New York City, U.S.
- Occupation: Businessman
- Spouse: Caroline Eliza Jaffray (m. 1868; died 1873)
- Children: 3, including Florence Jaffray Harriman

Francis William Jones Hurst (February 13, 1840 – July 21, 1902), a native of the British West Indies, was a major figure in the cross-Atlantic shipping business in the 19th century. During the American Civil War, he captained ships that ran the Union blockade of Confederate ports. From the War's end to his death, he was the New York-based manager for the National Steam-Ship Company (also known as the National Line). The National Line brought goods and thousands of emigrants from ports in the British Isles to New York.

== Early life ==
Francis William Jones Hurst was born in St. John's, Antigua (then in the British West Indies) on February 13, 1840. His father was Alphoso John Hurst and his mother Sarah Esther Tuzo, both Bermudians. His aunt Mary Hurst was the wife of John Harvey Darrell, Chief Justice of Bermuda 1856-1871.

Hurst completed his education in Bermuda, and relocated to London, where in 1856 he began his mercantile career.

== Career ==
Three years after his move to London, he joined Guion & Co. of Liverpool, and also became a member of the Fifth Lancashire Rifle Volunteers. The American Civil War began in 1861, soon after states in the southern United States created the Confederate States of America. The War immediately threatened the thriving trade between cotton plantations in those states and markets in Europe, especially after the Union Navy established a blockade of Confederate ports. That year Hurst returned to Bermuda and became managing clerk and agent for Edward Lawrence & Co., where his work included captaining ships seeking to “run” the Union naval blockade, carrying in guns, ammunition and medicine and carrying out cotton. One such ship, the Banshee, was the first steel-built vessel to cross the Atlantic. The Banshee made eight successful runs between the Bahamas and Wilmington, North Carolina, before being captured on its ninth voyage in November 1863. Throughout this time, Hurst remained a member of the Lancashire Rifle Volunteers, becoming a lieutenant in 1864.

In 1866 –one year after the War ended with the Confederacy's surrender – Hurst settled in New York, where he became United States manager for the British-based National Steam-ship Company. Using six to ten ships, the company ran weekly voyages between Liverpool and New York via Queenstown (now known as Cobh), Ireland (and to a lesser degree, between London and New York). Emigrants from Europe to the United States made up a significant part of the National Line's business, along with freight. In testimony to a congressional committee in 1888, he described the company's emigrant passengers as English, Irish, and Scots, with some from Germany and northern Europe.

=== Society and philanthropy ===
He was the longstanding treasurer of the New York Yacht Club, and was a three-time president of the St. George's Society of New York (from 1880–81, 1889–91, and 1895–96).

== Personal life ==
On June 2, 1868, Hurst married Caroline Eliza Jaffray, daughter of wealthy New York dry-goods merchant Edward Sommerville Jaffray. Two years later, Caroline gave birth to their first daughter, Florence. She would be known as “Daisy” before undertaking a long career in social work and public and political service. In 1873, however, after the birth of second and third daughters, Caroline Hurst died at age 29. Caroline's parents then assisted Hurst to raise his three daughters, namely:

- Florence Jaffray Hurst (1870–1967), who married J. Borden Harriman (1864–1914) in 1889.
- Ethel Wentworth Hurst (b. 1871), who lived in Hamilton, Bermuda.
- Caroline Elise Hurst (1873–1961), who married banker and teacher George Hope Mairs (1866–1933) of New Jersey, in April 1894.

Hurst and his daughters would spend their winters in a Fifth Avenue mansion, while spending their summers in an Irvington, New York estate.

In July 1902, he suffered an attack of appendicitis, at a point when he was already weakened by intestinal problems. He died soon thereafter, on July 21, 1902.
