= Biffen =

Biffen is a surname. Notable people with the surname include:

- Charles Edward Biffen, fictional character in the short story The Rummy Affair of Old Biffy by P. G. Wodehouse
- John Biffen, PC, DL (1930–2007), Conservative member of the UK House of Lords, after 36 years in the House of Commons
- Rowland Biffen (1874–1949), British botanist, geneticist, mycologist, professor of agricultural botany at the University of Cambridge
- Sarah Biffen (1784–1850), Victorian English painter born with no arms

== See also ==
- Biffen och Bananen (the Beef and the Banana), a comic strip by Rit-Ola, originally published in Folket i Bild, 1936–1978
- Biffen Lecture, lectureship organised by the John Innes Centre, named after Rowland Biffen
