= Robert Lyden =

American actor

- Robert Lyden as Bobby on Rocky Jones
- Born: Robert Marinus Lyden; May 28, 1942; Los Angeles, California, U.S.
- Died: January 17, 1986 (aged 43)
- Occupation: Actor
- Years active: 1949–1957

Robert Marinus Lyden (May 28, 1942 – January 17, 1986) was a child actor in the 1950s.

Robert Lyden made his film debut in 1949 with Holiday Affair and also played with Doris Day in the musical film I'll See You in My Dreams (1951). The child actor is probably best-known for his role as the young space cadet "Bobby" on the 1954 science fiction television show Rocky Jones, Space Ranger. After Rocky Jones (which lasted only two seasons), he made a few more television appearances, and had roles in some feature films. He had a short role in The Searchers (1956), in which he played John Wayne's nephew Ben. Also notable was his performance as a young Creighton Chaney in Man of a Thousand Faces, the 1957 biopic about Lon Chaney starring James Cagney. This turned out to be Lyden's last role; he left show business and pursued a career in finance.

== Filmography ==
Year	Title	Role	Notes
1949	Holiday Affair	Boy	Uncredited
1950	Emergency Wedding	Robert - Boy in Department Store	Uncredited
1951	I'll See You in My Dreams	Donald, at age 8	
1956	The Searchers	Ben Edwards	Uncredited
1956	Written on the Wind	Kyle as a Boy	Voice, Uncredited
1957	Man of a Thousand Faces	Creighton Chaney at 13	(final film role)

== Television ==
Year	Title	Role	Notes
1950–1951	Fireside Theatre		2 episodes
1954	Rocky Jones, Space Ranger	Bobby	31 episodes. Three of these were combined as the non-theatrical film 'Menace from Outer Space' (1956).
1955	Captain Midnight	Billy Griffiths	Episode: "The Human Bomb"
1955	Screen Directors Playhouse	Willie	Episode: "Rookie of the Year"
