= Hollingsworth Morse =

American television director (1910–1988)

John Hollingsworth Morse
- Born: John Hollingsworth Morse; December 16, 1910; Los Angeles, California, U.S.
- Died: January 23, 1988 (aged 77); Studio City, California, U.S.
- Occupation: Television director
- Years active: 1952–1986
- Spouse(s): Bonnie Baker (1943–?); Sally Eilers (1949–1958) (divorced); Sandra Gould (?–1988) (his death)

John Hollingsworth Morse (December 16, 1910 – January 23, 1988) was an American television director. He directed episodes of a wide variety of U.S. television series from the 1950s through the 1980s under the names Hollingsworth Morse and John H. Morse.

== Early career ==
Morse began his career in the casting department of Paramount Pictures, and eventually began to work closely with director George Stevens. During World War II, Stevens was Morse's commanding officer in the U.S. Army Signal Corps, where Morse rose to the rank of first lieutenant. In that capacity, Morse traveled with Stevens's unit through Europe and helped capture footage of the Battle of Normandy and other significant events of the European war. Morse reflected on these experiences through his participation in George Stevens Jr.'s 1994 documentary, George Stevens: D-Day to Berlin.

== Television ==
Hollingsworth has directed for 82 different television series or TV movies. His series work includes a single episode of numerous series, but he also worked extensively as a recurring or regular director for others, starting with 50 episodes of the first three seasons (1950–1953) of The Lone Ranger, continuing such series as Rocky Jones, Space Ranger (1953, 39 episodes), Zorro (1959, 19 episodes), Lassie (1959–1972, 62 episodes), McHale's Navy (1964–1966, 46 episodes), Adam-12 (1968–1975, 21 episodes), H.R. Pufnstuf (1969–1970, 17 episodes), Operation Petticoat (1977–1979, 16 episodes), The Dukes of Hazzard (1979–1983, 17 episodes), and The Fall Guy (1984–1986, 11 episodes). His final directorial work was an episode of The Fall Guy.

== Film ==
Hollingsworth also directed a lesser number of feature films throughout his career, including Daughters of Satan and the 1972 adaptation of the children's novel Justin Morgan Had a Horse.
