= Richard Crane (actor) =

American character actor (1918–1969)

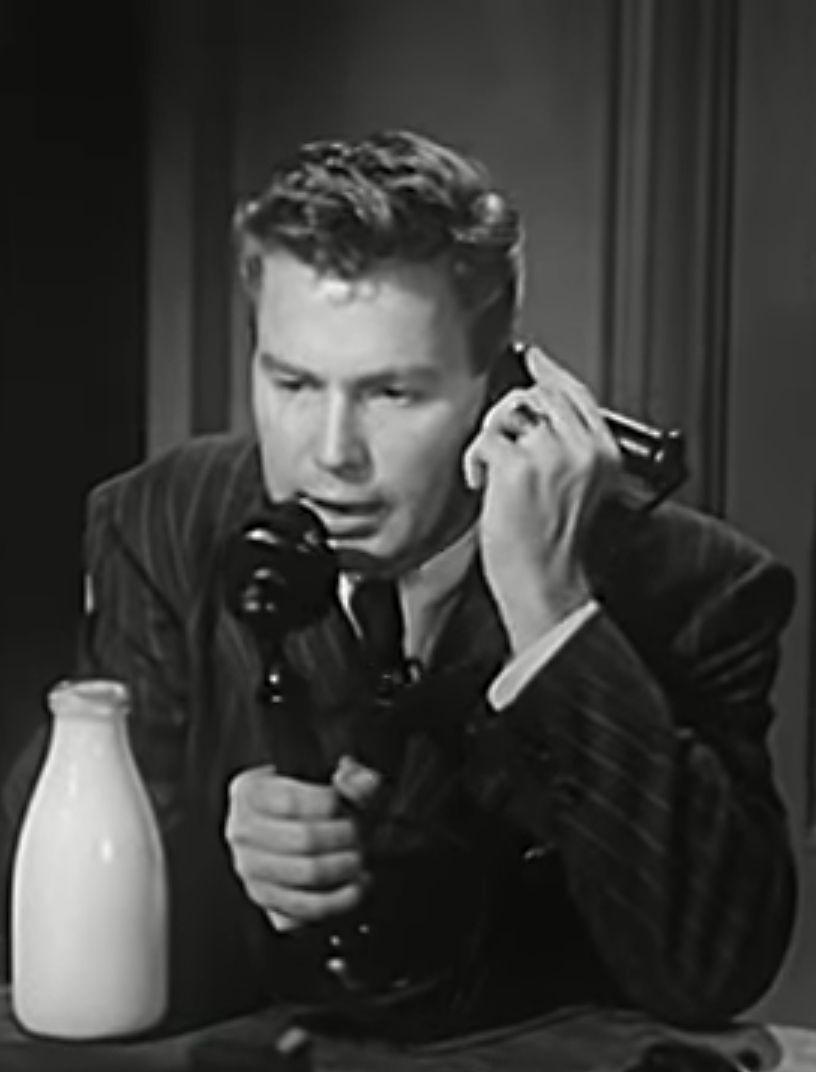
- Crane in Behind Green Lights (1946)
- Born: Richard Ollie Crane; June 6, 1918; New Castle, Indiana, U.S.
- Died: March 9, 1969 (aged 50); Hollywood, California, U.S.
- Resting place: Valhalla Memorial Park Cemetery
- Occupation: Actor
- Years active: 1940–1968
- Spouse: Kay Morley

Richard Ollie Crane (June 6, 1918 – March 9, 1969) was a character actor whose career spanned three decades of movies and television. His early career included many uncredited performances in feature movies made during the 1940s.

== Early years and career ==
Crane was born in New Castle, Indiana. Crane may be remembered best for his portrayal of the title role of the television science fiction series Rocky Jones, Space Ranger, which ran for one season starting in 1953. In 1952, he signed a seven-year contract that specified he was to make annual tours of the United States, appearing as Jones in presentations to school groups.

In 1949–1950, he played Lieutenant Cummings in Mysteries of Chinatown a crime drama television series broadcast by ABC. Crane also appeared in the outer-space adventure movie serial Commando Cody: Sky Marshal of the Universe in 1953, as Dick Preston, Cody's semi-comical sidekick, and was the hero of movie serial Mysterious Island (1951), adapted from Jules Verne's novel Mysterious Island.

Crane played Gene Plehan in the crime drama television series Surfside 6 broadcast by ABC (1960–1962). He later made numerous appearances in many popular TV shows. In 1958-1959 he made two guest appearances on Perry Mason: as George Moore in "The Case of the Lonely Heiress," and Dr. Douglas Keene in "The Case of the Caretaker's Cat." In 1960 he appeared on Wagon Train in S3 E14 "The Lita Foladaire Story" as Clay Foladaire. Other television appearances included The Lone Ranger, Death Valley Days, Dragnet, Lassie, The Rifleman, and Gang Busters, in which he played gangster John Dillinger's associate Homer Van Meter. (Footage from Gang Busters, including Crane's part as Homer Van Meter, was edited into the low-budget theatrical movie Guns Don't Argue.)

Crane acted on stage with the Las Palmas Theater, performing in Command Decision in 1949 and Light Up The Sky in 1950.

== Death ==
Crane died of heart failure at the age of 50. He is buried in Valhalla Memorial Park Cemetery.

== Partial filmography ==
- Susan and God (1940) - Bob
- We Who Are Young (1940) - Savoy-Carlton Bellboy (uncredited)
- Meet the Wildcat (1940) - Bill—Office Worker (uncredited)
- Who Killed Aunt Maggie? (1940) - Radio Station Man (uncredited)
- Keeping Company (1940) - Eddie Lane (uncredited)
- The Saint in Palm Springs (1941) - Whitey (uncredited)
- Double Date (1941) - Boy (uncredited)
- In the Navy (1941) - Office Boy (uncredited)
- Keep 'Em Flying (1941) - Cadet Stevens (uncredited)
- Tillie the Toiler (1941) - Young man (uncredited)
- This Time for Keeps (1942) - Eustace Andrews
- Eagle Squadron (1942) - Griffith
- The Phantom Plainsmen (1942) - Tad Marvin
- Sweater Girl (1942) - Freshman (uncredited)
- Her Cardboard Lover (1942) - Casino Page (uncredited)
- Flying Tigers (1942) - Airfield Radioman (uncredited)
- This Is the Army (1943) - Sergeant on Field March (uncredited)
- Someone to Remember (1943) - Paul Parker
- So Proudly We Hail! (1943) - Georgie Larson (uncredited)
- Corvette K-225 (1943) - Leading Torpedo Man (uncredited)
- Happy Land (1943) - Russell 'Rusty' Marsh
- Cry 'Havoc' (1943) - Man (uncredited)
- Riders of the Deadline (1943) - Tim Mason
- Ladies Courageous (1944) - Carl (uncredited)
- None Shall Escape (1944) - Willie Grimm as a Man
- Follow the Boys (1944) - Marine Officer (uncredited)
- Wing and a Prayer (1944) - Ens. Gus Chisholm
- An American Romance (1944) - Hank (uncredited)
- Captain Eddie (1945) - Capt. Bill Cherry
- The Flying Serpent (1946) - Radio Announcer (uncredited)
- Behind Green Lights (1946) - Johnny Williams - Reporter
- Johnny Comes Flying Home (1946) - Johnny Martin
- Campus Honeymoon (1948) - Robert Watson
- Arthur Takes Over (1948) - James Clark
- Waterfront at Midnight (1948) - Denny Hanrohan
- Triple Threat (1948) - Don Whitney
- Angel on the Amazon (1948) - Johnny MacMahon
- Dynamite (1949) - Johnny Brown
- A Lady Without Passport (1950) - Lt. Maxon, Navy Flyer
- The Last Outpost (1951) - Lt. McReady (uncredited)
- Home Town Story (1951) - Don (uncredited)
- Mysterious Island (1951 serial) - Capt. Cyrus Harding
- Man in the Saddle (1951) - Juke Vird
- Leadville Gunslinger (1952) - Jim Blanchard
- Thundering Caravans (1952) - Deputy Dan Reed
- Ellis in Freedomland (1952) - Male Model
- Winning of the West (1953) - Jack Autry aka Jack Austin
- Woman They Almost Lynched (1953) - Yankee Lieutenant (uncredited)
- The Neanderthal Man (1953) - Dr. Ross Harkness
- The Great Adventures of Captain Kidd (1953 serial) - Richard Dale
- Sea of Lost Ships (1953) - Radar Man (uncredited)
- Flight Nurse (1953) - Lt. Will Cary (uncredited)
- The Eternal Sea (1955) - Lt. Johnson
- No Man's Woman (1955) - Dick Sawyer
- Bobby Ware Is Missing (1955) - Police Car Deputy in Car #12
- The Eddy Duchin Story (1956) - Seaman (uncredited)
- "Guns Don't Argue" (1957) - Homer Van Meter
- Bailout at 43,000 (1957) - Captain Jack Nolan
- Official Detective (1957, Episode: "Hired Killer") - Det. Benson
- The Deep Six (1958) - Lieutenant j.g. Swanson
- The Alligator People (1959) - Paul Webster
- Battle Flame (1959) - Dr. Bill Stoddard
- 13 Fighting Men (1960) - Loomis
- Devil's Partner (1961) - David Simpson
- Boy Who Caught a Crook (1961) - Connors
- House of the Damned (1963) - Joseph Schiller
- Please Don't Touch Me (1963)
- Surf Party (1964) - Sgt. Wayne Neal

== Sources and External Links ==
- Richard Crane at IMDb
- Profile, epguides.com
- Space Hero Files: Rocky Jones, Space Ranger, slick-net.com
- A database and Cover gallery of Rocky Jones, Space Ranger, comics.org
