= Alice Frost =

American actress (1910–1998)

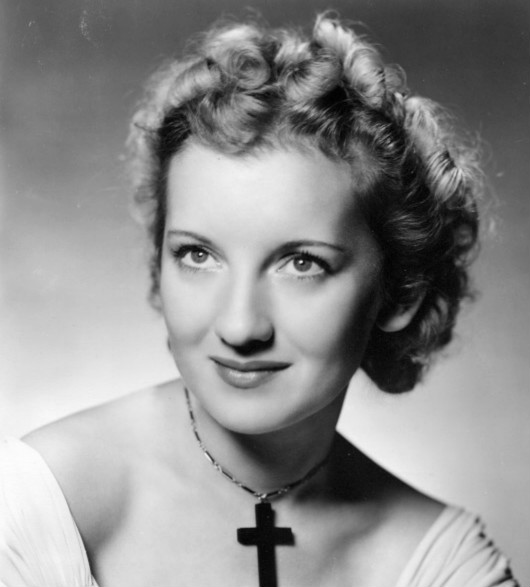
- Frost in 1940
- Born: Alice Dorothy Margaret Frost; August 1, 1910; Minneapolis, Minnesota, U.S.
- Died: January 6, 1998 (aged 87); Naples, Florida, U.S.
- Occupation: Actress
- Years active: 1926–1979
- Known for: Pamela North in radio's Mr. and Mrs. North

Alice Frost (August 1, 1910 – January 6, 1998) was an American actress. An inaugural member of Orson Welles's Mercury Theatre on radio and the stage, she later performed the role of Pamela North on the radio series Mr. and Mrs. North for nearly 10 years.

== Early years ==
Alice Dorothy Margaret Frost was born on August 1, 1910, in Minneapolis, Minnesota, the youngest of four children.

Her father, Rev. John A. Frost, was a Swedish immigrant and served as a minister in the Lutheran church in Mora, Minnesota, and her mother was the church's organist. She attended high school in Mora and was active with the school's newspaper, glee club, drama society, and debate society. She enrolled at the University of Minnesota but had to drop out after her father's death. Later, she studied dramatics and voice for two years at the MacPhail School of Music in Minneapolis. She worked in a department store's credit department.

== Radio ==
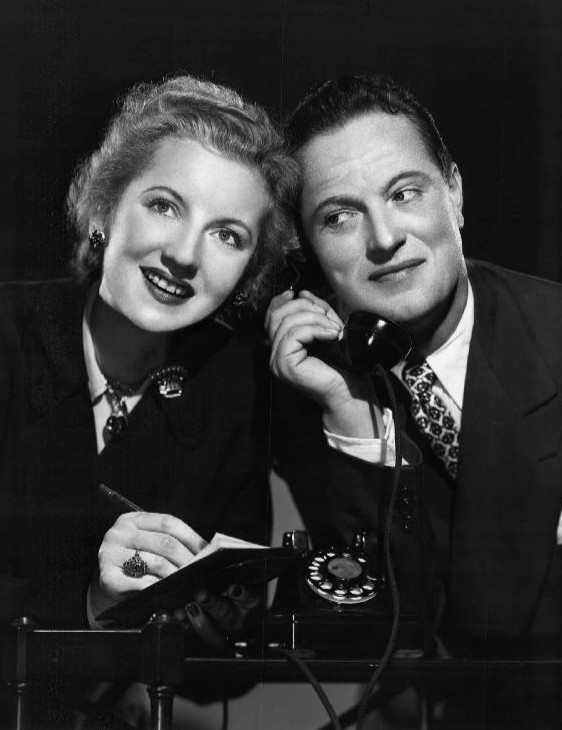
Frost and Joseph Curtin as Mr. and Mrs. North (1950)

Frost debuted on radio at age 16 as a singer, participating in a duet with a friend on a Minneapolis station. By 1933, she was a member of the cast of The Criminal Court.

In 1934, she was "one of the ghost voices during CBS-WABC's Forty-Five Minutes In Hollywood." She was an inaugural member of Orson Welles's Mercury Theatre, on radio and on the stage, and was one of his favorite actresses.

An item in a 1939 newspaper noted Frost's "art of mimicry," saying "Alice is known to her friends as 'the girl of a hundred voices'"—a talent which originated from her childhood, when she heard ministers who visited her home "when they returned from their missions in far-off places like Siam, India or Japan... [T]he missionaries delighted in teaching the little girl their various Hindustani, Javanese or Far Eastern dialects." By 1938, she had already played "more than thirty different types of roles." An item in a 1937 newspaper reported: "It's nothing unusual for her to appear in as many as eight network shows in a week, each one calling for a different role. In quick succession, she has been a comedienne, a tragedian, an ingenue, a mother, a daughter and a witch!"

In the 1930s, Frost was "hostess, secretary, heckler and general all-around actress each Sunday" on Stoopnagle and Budd. Late in that decade, she appeared regularly on Melody and Madness and Undercover Squad.

In 1941, Frost starred in Are You a Missing Heir? Her other roles as a regular cast member included those show in the table below.

Program	Role
Big Sister	Ruth Evans
Bright Horizon	Ruth Evans Wayne
Camel Caravan	"girl stooge"
Home Sweet Home	Lucy Kent
Mighty Casey	Casey's girl friend.
Mrs. Wiggs of the Cabbage Patch	Miss Hazy
Summer Town Hall Tonight	"No. 1 heckler"
The Second Mrs. Burton	Marcia
Woman of Courage	Martha Jackson

She also was heard in Song of the Stranger, The Shadow, Grand Central Station, The Campbell Playhouse, What Would You Have Done, On Broadway, Famous Jury Trials, Al Pearce and His Gang, David Harum, Lorenzo Jones, Suspense, Aunt Jenny's Real Life Stories, The Fat Man, Romance, The Big Story, Les Misérables, The Mercury Theatre on the Air, Mr. District Attorney, Johnny Presents, The FBI in Peace and War, Don Ameche's True Life Stories, and Columbia Workshop.

== Stage ==
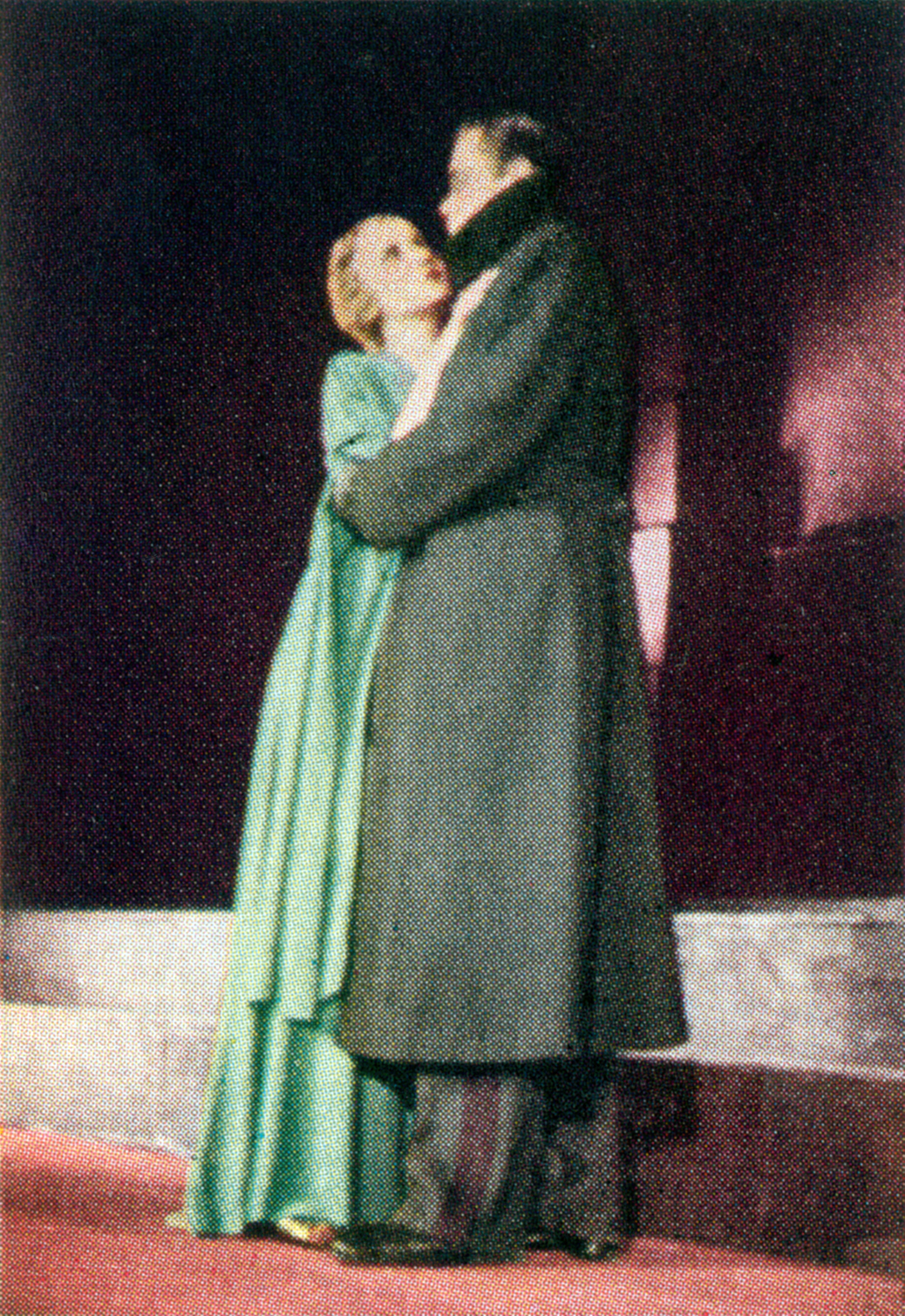
Alice Frost and Orson Welles in Caesar (1938)

In 1928, Frost appeared on stage in Chautauqua performances, playing Lorelei in Gentlemen Prefer Blondes. A year later, she was part of a stock theater company in Miami.

In 1932, she appeared in It's the Law, a farce presented at the Ritz Theater in Scranton, Pennsylvania.

She appeared on Broadway in Green Grow the Lilacs (1931), The Great Lover (1932), As Husbands Go (1933), It's a Wise Child (1933), the Mercury Theatre productions Caesar (1937–38) and The Shoemaker's Holiday (1938), A Roomful of Roses (1955), and The Bad Seed (1955).

In 1967, Frost co-starred with Jack Bailey in a four-week production of Ah, Wilderness! at the Pasadena Playhouse.

== Film ==
Frost had a role in the independent film Damaged Love in 1930. She worked for the Independent Eastern Pictures company.

== Television ==
Frost played Mama Holstrom in 10 episodes of The Farmer's Daughter and Trina on Mama. She appeared in two episodes of Hazel and also had the role of Miss Bickle in the unsold pilot of the comedy His Model Wife. She was also seen on Gunsmoke, Goodyear Theatre, Bus Stop, and The Alcoa Hour.

In the 1960s, Frost appeared in two episodes of The Twilight Zone (season 1, episode 4, "The Sixteen-Millimeter Shrine", and season 3, episode 8, "It's a Good Life", as Aunt Amy). She also found roles in the decade's popular Westerns, appearing on The Tall Man, The Virginian and in two episodes of both Bonanza and Wagon Train. As the Westerns gave way to the police and detective dramas of the 1970s, Frost found work on such series as Ironside, Adam-12, Police Woman, and Baretta.

Frost's final television work included a 1978 visit to Fantasy Island and a 1979 episode of Buck Rogers in the 25th Century, her last role.

== Recognition ==
Frost was named the winner in the Radio category among America's 13 Best Dressed Women for 1941. Winners were "selected in an annual poll of 100 leading designers for the Fashion Academy Awards."

== Death ==
Frost died on January 6, 1998, in Naples, Florida, aged 87.

== Selected filmography ==
- Alfred Hitchcock Presents (1961) (Season 6 Episode 34: "Servant Problem") as Lydia Standish
- The Alfred Hitchcock Hour (1964) (Season 2 Episode 29: "Bed of Roses") as Eda Faye Hardwicke
