= Your Family and Mine =

American radio drama series

Your Family and Mine actress Lucille Wall, seen in this caricature by announcer Norman Sweetser.

Your Family and Mine is an American radio drama series that aired April 25, 1938 – April 28, 1939, on NBC, and May 1, 1939 – April 26, 1940, on CBS. Sponsored by Sealtest, the 15-minute soap opera program aired weekdays at 5:15 p.m. ET on NBC, and at 2:30 p.m. ET on CBS.

The series was created by Lillian Lauferty, following her success with the daytime drama series Big Sister, which had a long run from 1936 to 1952.

Bill Adams starred as Matthew Wilbur, head of a middle-class family living in High Falls, Montana, coping during the Depression. Other cast included Lucille Wall as his wife, Winifred; Joan Tompkins as their daughter, Judy, Billy Lipton as their son, Ken, and Parker Fennelly as the owner of the store where Matthew works.

== Characters and story ==
The storyline focused on the Wilbur family household and vicissitudes in the lives of the family members. A story arc in April–May 1939 led listeners to ask if Judy Wilbur had been kidnapped.

Newspaper ads carried this copy: "Share the hopes and fears, the loves and triumphs of the Wilbur Family in this thrilling story—Your Family and Mine."
