= Maudie Mason =

Maude (Maudie) Mason was the protagonist, and narrator, of the “Maudie stories” and “Maudie books” written by American authors Graeme and Sarah Lorimer in the 1930s and ’40s, and of the radio show “Maudie’s Diary”, which aired in 1941–42. The stories, which featured romantic schemes, contemporary slang, and witty banter, revolved around the adventures, tribulations, loves, and losses of an American teenage girl.

== Biographical ==
Maudie's full name is Maude Worthington Benevolence Mason, but she keeps that a secret because “even I could never live it down.” She lives in or near Philadelphia with her parents and—for a while—her older sister, Sylvia. In Men Are Like Street Cars, she is sixteen. In Stag Line, she is seventeen. She is eighteen in Heart Specialist, “practically a grown-up”, and remembers being “a naïve child of sixteen.” She is 18 or 19and anticipates her next birthday (in May) in First Love, Farewell. Many young adults come into Maudie's life, but the most constant presence is her friend, David (Davy) Dillon, with whom there are recurring romantic possibilities; she strings him along, but seems to settle on him more seriously late in the series. She has a comfortable upper-middle class life, and spends much of her time in romantic schemes and manipulations, sometimes joined by such friends as Pauline. She says Davy has suspected her motives since she was 11.

Numerous facts about Maudie and her family are disclosed in the course of the series, some of them showing the inconsistency of a serial work. Maudie is blonde, and proud of it; she weighs 110 pounds (50 kg). Maudie's friends include Alix (her best female friend), Julie Purviance, who “has just about as much brains as beauty” (not much), Pauline (Pauly) Howard, and Mary Brandt and her brother Bill. Maudie's father is called variously Dick and Franklin. He is on the board (possibly the chair) of Memorial Hospital. Her mother's name is not revealed. Maudie's sister Sylvia marries Jerry, who is pointedly not a native Philadelphian.

Davy has an older sister, Ting. His car is nicknamed the Fallen Arch, and he manages his school boxing team. He later goes to “the university” (presumably Penn), where he manages the tennis team and is probably a year or two older than Maudie. Maudie has a cousin Joy from Baltimore, who visits and causes problems. Her other relatives include an Aunt Esther and Uncle Arthur in Philadelphia, and Aunts Rachel and Benevolence. Her godfather, “Uncle Ned” Chace, lives in Chicago after doing “something awful”, but redeems himself and reappears later.

Maudie worries about "unfair discrimination against women" and observes that "it's all right to have a mind if you use it to tell a man how wonderful he is." Nevertheless, she opines that "A girl owes it to herself to occasionally get a man into a jam, but she owes it to him to always get him out." She has a parody version of "The Star-Spangled Banner", and is a Republican. She is not much for books, “as personally I prefer to live life than to read about it.” She is quick with snappy banter, read Little Black Sambo as a child, and has an appendectomy. She has a coming-out garden party in June; she is the first girl in “our crowd” to have one. She had a crush on “Baldy” Baldridge, a steeplechase rider, “for years”.

== Background and development ==
Graeme and Sarah Lorimer were a husband-and-wife author team, “two members of Philadelphia main line society”, who married in 1926 and had four children of their own. They specialized in literary works in the romantic comedy theme, such as “The Plot Sickens” and “Feature for June”, which Graeme co-wrote with Eileen Tighe and which was adapted as the movie June Bride. Graeme Lorimer was the fiction editor of the Ladies’ Home Journal and the son of George Horace Lorimer, long-time editor of The Saturday Evening Post. Sarah Lorimer was the daughter of Frank H. Moss, a Philadelphia housing developer and mortgage banker.

The Lorimers wrote at least 36 short stories featuring “Maudie” for the Ladies’ Home Journal in the 1930s and 1940s. According to family tradition, Graeme devised the plots, and Sarah provided the dialogue. Many of the characters and situations came from the authors’ own lives and those of their friends, who formed the basis of a number of the characters and story lines. Sarah Lorimer's brother, Hunter Moss, and his wife Dora were the inspiration for Sylvia and Jerry, and Graeme Lorimer borrowed at least one of his younger brothers’ entanglements for a plot. When they ran low on their own witty banter, the Lorimers offered to pay teens they knew for any wisecracks that got published. They were sufficiently successful that Life magazine called them “lexicographers to the independent young American female.”

The books are structured by episodic chapters, each a story in itself and with little connection between them; they are essentially reprints of the magazine stories. Some of the stories were adapted for the stage by the Lorimers and others.

== Books ==
- Men Are Like Street Cars (1934); dedicated “to Hunter and his crowd”
- Stag Line (1934); dedicated to Hugh MacNair Kahler
- Heart Specialist (1935); dedicated to Frank H. Moss
- First Love, Farewell (1940)

=== Reviews ===
In its assessment of the series, Kirkus Reviews called Maudie "The perfect sub-deb, of the 1930s" and opined the books would appeal to "young people as well as adults." Another review mentioned the stories had "gay flavor" and "spontaneity". Kirkus' review of Heart Specialist said its stories "are irrespressible, bubbling over with good humor and a keen appreciation of the mirth and the pathos, the drama and the imaginative qualities of the sub deb, 1935 edition. And what an ear for the lingo they have. Ask your young fry what they think of them."

== Maudie’s Diary ==
The books' popularity gave rise to a radio series, Maudie’s Diary. The show, described as a “juvenile comedy”, began August 14, 1941, airing at 7:30 p.m. on Thursdays on CBS. Albert G. Miller wrote the scripts; the show starred Mary Mason as Maudie and Robert Walker as Davy. Betty Garde and Bill Johnstone played Maudie's parents, and Marjorie Davies portrayed her sister, Sylvia. In July 1942, the network replaced the pregnant Mary Mason with Charita Bauer; the program was canceled September 24 of that year.

Each episode of the program began, and ended, with Maudie reading an entry from her diary. This opened into, or wound up, each story presented. The story lines revolved around the characters’ difficulties with such adolescent concerns as dates, cars, allowances, homework, annoying siblings, and meddlesome relatives. One episode, involving learning to play the trombone, was included in the annual anthology, “Best Broadcasts of 1940-41.” The program was sponsored by Continental Baking Company; Wonder Bread and Hostess Cakes featured in some promotional literature.
