= Marie Manning (writer) =

American journalist

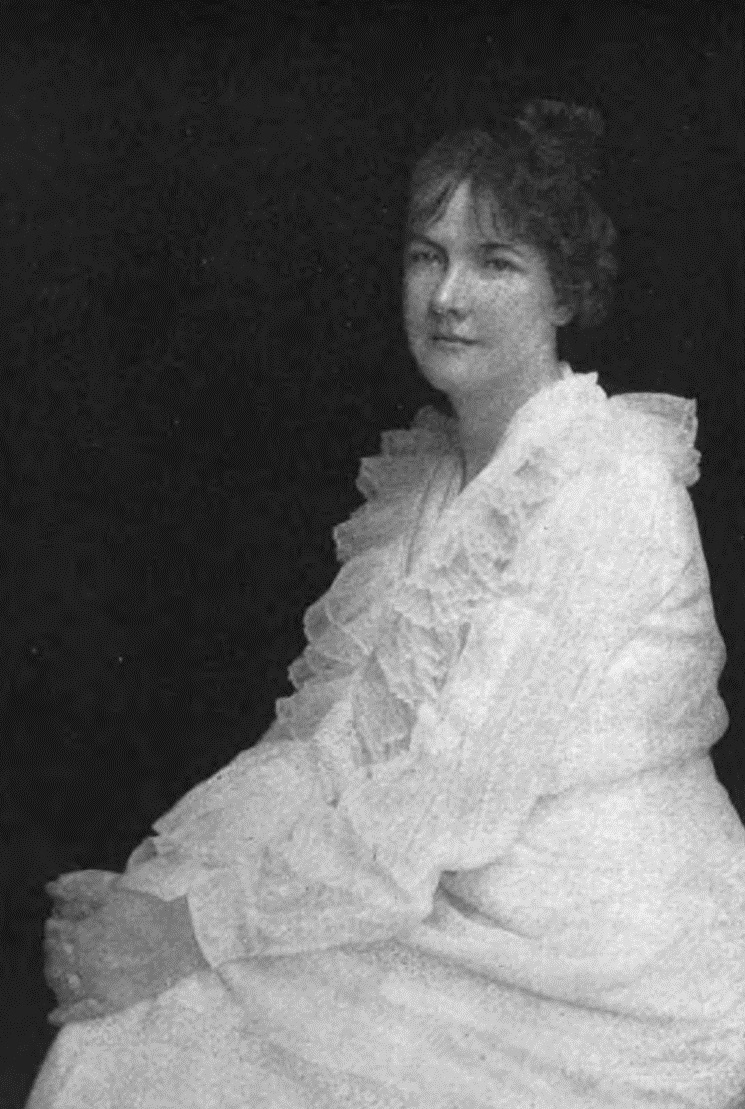
Marie Manning c. 1904

Marie Manning (January 22, 1869 – November 28, 1945) was an American newspaper columnist and novelist in the early 20th century. She wrote the first newspaper advice column, Dear Beatrice Fairfax, in 1898, the precursor to modern versions such as Dear Abby and Ann Landers.

== Early life ==
Manning was born in Washington, DC to Elizabeth Barrett and Michael Charles Manning. Her year of birth was unknown to even her immediate family and closest confidants during her lifetime. She was a one-year-old in the 1870 Census for Washington, D.C. She was educated at various private schools in the District of Columbia, graduating from Miss Kerr's, a finishing school for girls.

Her mother had died in childbirth and her father died when she was 18 years old. Her father took her to England in 1885 to live with relatives; here she studied British society and wrote her first novel, Lord Alingham, Bankrupt. It was published in 1902.

Manning began writing as a columnist for the New York World in 1896 at the "space rate" of $5 per week. After being granted an exclusive interview with the President of the United States, Grover Cleveland, she was promoted to permanent staff and her salary was raised to $30 per week. When the paper's editor moved to the New York Evening Journal in 1898, she followed at his invitation. There she collaborated with two other women to create a women's page entitled the "Hen Coop".

== Dear Beatrice Fairfax ==
During the same year, the Hen Coop received three readers' letters seeking personal advice. Manning suggested a new column exclusively devoted to personal advice. The column was named Dear Beatrice Fairfax at her suggestion, after Dante's Beatrice and her own family's country home in Fairfax County, Virginia. The column began on July 20, 1898, as the first advice column in the United States.

Her advice was an immediate success, and the column received so many letters that the United States Post Office soon refused to deliver them and the Journal had to retrieve the letters itself. Manning's commonsense advice was tremendously popular and was imitated nationwide. But Manning's efforts went largely unrewarded by the newspaper, and her pay and status remained low. She eventually resigned around 1920 and the column was taken over by Lillian Lauferty.

== Novels ==
During her lifetime, Manning had four novels published:

- Lord Alingham, Bankrupt (1902)
- Judith of the Plains (1903)
- Personal Reply (1943)
- Ladies Now and Then (1945)

== Marriage and freelance career ==
On June 12, 1905, Manning married Herman Eduard Gasch, a real estate agent, and devoted most of her life to raising her two sons. During this time she freelanced and her short stories were published in various magazines including Harper's Monthly and Ladies' Home Journal. She was an ardent suffragist and marched and lobbied for the cause, supported by her like-minded husband.

== Return to column ==
Manning had invested an inheritance from her father in the markets in order to supplement her husband's earnings, and the loss of this money in the Wall Street crash of 1929 caused the family financial hardship. Manning went back to work for the New York Evening Journal, again writing her Beatrice Fairfax column (which had been syndicated for years). She wrote the column until her death in 1945.

== Cultural references ==
There are references to Beatrice Fairfax in several popular songs of her era. One is in the opening verse of George and Ira Gershwin's song "But Not For Me", from the 1930 musical Girl Crazy:

Beatrice Fairfax, don't you dare
Ever tell me he will care.
I'm certain
It's the final curtain...

Another is in the verse of the 1919 song "Take Your Girlie to the Movies", by Bert Kalmar, Edgar Leslie, and Pete Wendling:

Beatrice Fairfax gives advice,
To anyone in love;
That's why Johnny Gray
Wrote to her one day...

A third is in the song "Nobody Makes a Pass at Me", from Harold Rome's 1937 revue Pins and Needles (later made famous by Barbra Streisand):

Oh Beatrice Fairfax, give me the bare facts,
How do you make them fall?
If you don't save me, the things the Lord gave me
Never will be any use to me at all.

There is a poem by Kenneth Fearing entitled "Dear Beatrice Fairfax" in which he metaphorically lambastes social status as product guarantees.

Another popular song from 1919, "Oh By Jingo! (Oh By Gee You're The Only Girl For Me)," by Albert Von Tilzer with lyrics by Lew Brown, makes a reference in the third verse:

Home they went with spirits wilted
On account of they were jilted
(All the By-Goshes, with hearts down to their galoshes!)
All winter long they brooded—that is, all but very few did
(They left to join a fan club for Lana Toyn-a.)
The rest wrote to Beatrice Fairfax
Got the how-to-make-him-care facts
So came the spring
They sailed once more to sing...
