= Carl Bixby =

American writer (1895–1978)

Carl Bixby (May 4, 1895 - June 29, 1978) was an American writer who worked primarily on radio and television programs.

== Early years ==
Bixby was born on May 4, 1895, in Worcester, Massachusetts, the son of Mr. and Mrs. Waldo H. Bixby. He moved to Richmond, Virginia, when he was 12 years old. While there he acted in, directed, and wrote amateur theatrical productions. During his junior year he left high school for a job in the newspaper business. In 1915, as a member of the Monumental Minstrels, Bixby was part of a comedy skit and sang a solo in a fundraising program for a church in Richmond. He went into the military in 1917, serving briefly in a cavalry unit in Brownsville, Texas.

== Career ==
=== Newspapers ===
Bixby worked on The News & Observer in Raleigh, North Carolina, and the Birmingham Ledger in Alabama, with his interests inclined toward advertising and promotion.

=== Advertising ===
Bixby worked for an advertising agency in Richmond in the early 1920s. While he worked at an advertising agency in New York City he suggested using "Good to the last drop" as an advertising slogan for Maxwell House coffee. He attributed the expression to President Theodore Roosevelt. At one point, a client sought a radio program on which he could advertise. Bixby, with no actual program available, made up a concept that the client liked. Having sold the idea, Bixby had to create it, and he spent a week in his Long Island apartment writing the beginning of the serial Dangerous Paradise. That was his entry into radio.

=== Radio and television ===
Bixby created the radio drama Life Can Be Beautiful, which ran for 17 years, and produced one of radio's first serials, Dangerous Paradise. Other radio programs for which he wrote included Club Romance, This Day Is Ours, The Man I Married, Big Sister and Second Husband. He adapted the book Kitty Foyle to run for 26 weeks on the series Stories America Loves. Bixby's other work on radio included producing Radio Reader's Digest. On October 31, 1949, he began a daily inspirational program, Life Today, on station WICC in Bridgeport, Connecticut.

==== Club Romance ====
A "musical romance built around a mythical night club" was the focus of the Club Romance serial. The show's format limited scripting for it. Two solos by the male singing lead, two by the female singing lead, their duet, and at least three orchestral pieces left limited time for spoken words in each episode. Bixby typically began by writing about 4,000 words for an episode, after which he edited until the final script contained about 10 percent of that total. A review of the program commented that the remaining "pungent lines" tied the episode's segments together with humor while retaining "a keynote of romantic suspense".

==== Dangerous Paradise ====
In its first year, Dangerous Paradise progressed from being "just another radio drama" to ranking "as one of the most acclaimed features of its type". Bixby wrote a popular novel adapted from the program's scripts. Published by The Macaulay Company in 1934, the 309-page book was one of the first novels adapted from a program that had been "acclaimed by the radio audience". A review said that the book had much the same interest and suspense as the radio program. He spent the summer of 1934 in Canada "gathering local color" for the upcoming season, which had the hero returning to his native country.

By 1938 Bixby had parted ways with Nick Dawson, the program's star, and Bixby sued to prevent continuation of the series. He lost the case when New York's Supreme Court ruled that any content created by a script writer belonged to his or her employer. The ruling on December 24, 1937, was one of the first legal decisions regarding rights of people who wrote for radio programs. Bixby's attorney submitted a 180-page brief in support of his position. The unanimous decision said that because Dawson fully paid Bixby for work that he completed, he had the right to hire another writer upon the sponsor's request.

==== Life Can Be Beautiful ====
Bixby and Don Becker wrote Life Can Be Beautiful. Bixby lived in Connecticut, while Becker lived in Virginia, and they met at irregular intervals only for plotting of advancement of the story. Conferring in a locked room in a hotel in New York City for three days, they produced a plot for another six weeks to six months of the program. After that session one wrote the dialogue, and the other edited it. Which man had which role varied randomly, and no one but the two of them knew who was the writer and who was the editor for any given group of scripts.

==== Television ====
Bixby's work on television included writing The Edge of Night and The Secret Storm. He said that working on The Secret Storm was equivalent to writing one full-length play per week, and he maintained a plan one year ahead of the show's status at any given time. He often spent a full day working on the show in his home in Connecticut, and sometimes continued into the night when inspiration struck him. He watched the show to see how it was "developing and progressing", and sometimes revised a part based on how the actor or actress portrayed the character.

=== Other activities ===
==== Magazine ====
In October 1948 Bixby launched a magazine, Life Can Be Beautiful. Although the name was the same as that of the radio show, the publication was not affiliated with the program. The magazine was designed to have a personal focus for men and women, covering topics that included divorce, education, family life, health, religion, and sex. Bixby called it "a personal magazine of practical optimism" and added, "Our message is that life can be beautiful if you have the courage to make it so."

==== Plays ====
When Bixby lived in Richmond he often had male lead roles in productions of the Little Theater League, and he performed in the Legion Follies for the American Legion. In the early 1930s he performed with the Salon Players, part of the Salon of Seven Arts, in Jackson Heights in New York City.

Beginning when he was 12 years old, Bixby wrote one play a year. Many of them were presented by amateur theatrical groups, including the Westport Players in the area of Connecticut in which he lived. For those productions he also acted, directed, and helped with creation of sets. His playelet The Night Before was produced in Greenwich Village in 1924. He sometimes sought feedback about plays that he wrote from his mentor, John Golden.

== Personal life and death ==
Bixby married Lillian Beatrice Harding, and they had two sons. He died on June 29, 1978, in his home in Southbury, Connecticut, aged 83.
