= Life Can Be Beautiful =

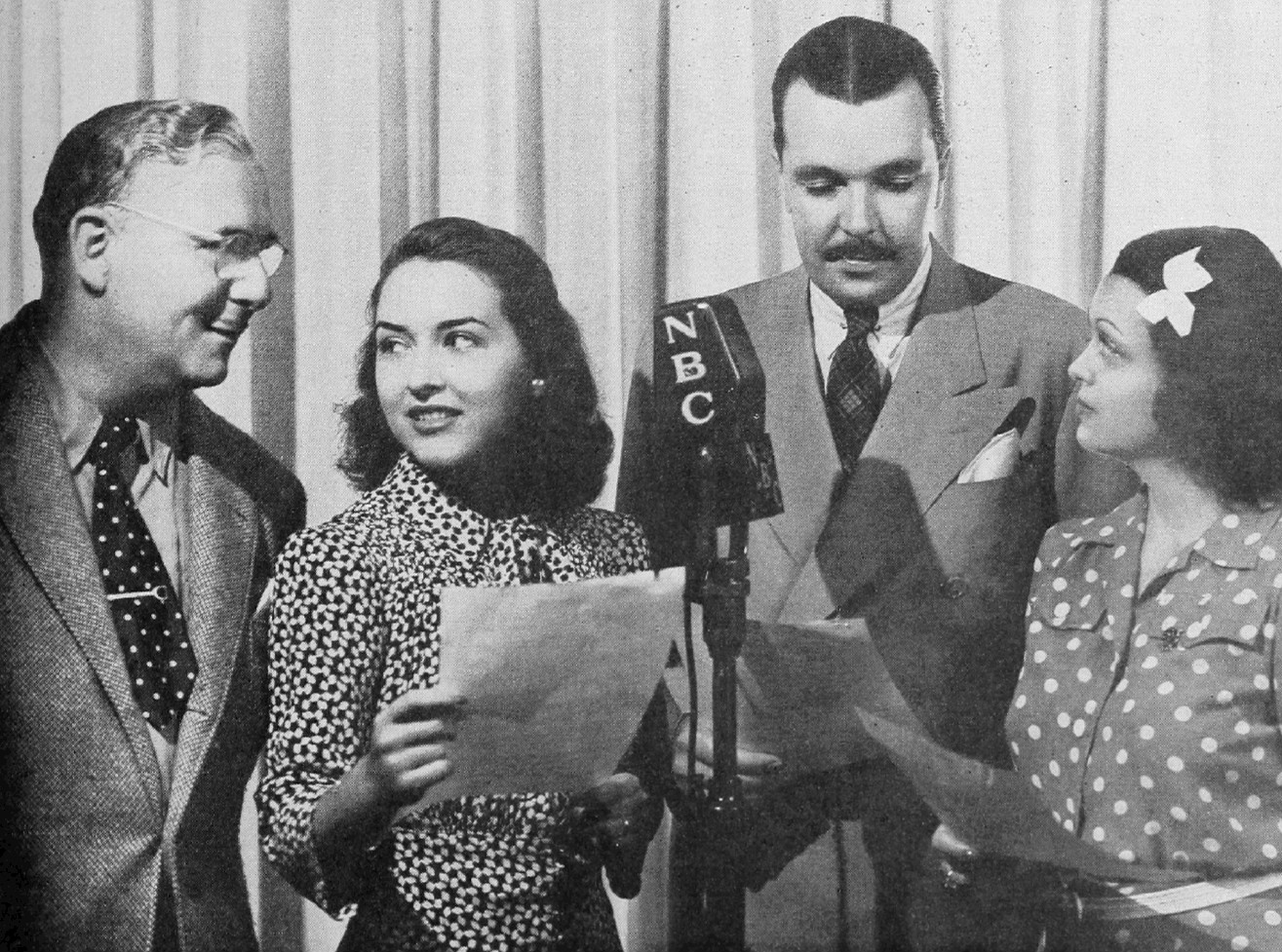
- The cast in 1940 from left: Ralph Locke ("Papa David" Solomon), Mitzi Gould (Rita), John Holbrook (Stephen Hamilton), Alice Reinhardt ("Chichi" Conrad)
- Genre: Soap opera
- Country of origin: United States
- Language: English
- Syndicates: CBS
- Starring: Alice Reinheart; Ralph Locke; John Holbrook; Carl Eastman; Mitzi Gould
- Announcer: Ralph Edwards; Ed Herlihy
- Created by: Don Becker; Carl Bixby
- Written by: Don Becker; Carl Bixby
- Original release: September 5, 1938 – June 25, 1954
- Opening theme: Melody in C
- Sponsored by: Ivory Soap

Life Can Be Beautiful was a daytime radio drama broadcast on NBC and CBS during its 16-year run. The program was also facetiously known to many as Elsie Beebe, a contrived acronym based on the show's initials.

Scripted by Don Becker and Carl Bixby, it was billed as "an inspiring message of faith drawn from life" and remained one of the leading soap operas through the 1940s. Becker also composed the program's theme song, Melody in C.

Sponsored by Procter & Gamble and Spic and Span, it premiered September 5, 1938 on NBC and moved two months later to CBS, where it was heard from November 7, 1938 to June 21, 1946. Concurrently, it was also airing on NBC from July 3, 1939 to April 25, 1941. The final run was on NBC from June 24, 1946 to June 25, 1954.

== Characters and story ==
Carol Conrad (Alice Reinheart, 1938–46 and Teri Keane, 1946-54), aka Chichi, was a teen on the run until Papa David Solomon (Ralph Locke), owner of the Slightly Read Bookshop, gave her a home. She continued to live in the back room of the bookstore while engaging in a romance with crippled law student Stephen Hamilton (John Holbrook, Earl Larrimore). The couple was briefly married in 1944.

Ralph Edwards and Ed Herlihy were the announcers.

== Cultural legacy ==
In 1948, "Life Can Be Beautiful" was a song by Jimmy McHugh and Harold Adamson.

The title was sometimes employed as a sarcastic catchphrase, as when it was spoken by William Holden in Sunset Boulevard (1950) and James Dean in Rebel Without a Cause (1955). In the 1944 film I'll Be Seeing You, Ginger Rogers’ character mentions the radio program "Life Can Be Wonderful" to Joseph Cotten's character during a romantic moment. Jack Benny also alluded to the program on his radio series, and Homer and Jethro released a 1959 album called Life Can Be Miserable.

The phrase entered the language and continues to the present day with both humorous and legitimate usage. It has been used for titles of fiction, nonfiction, poetry and self-help books.

== Listen to ==
- Life Can Be Beautiful (September 21, 1939)
- University of Virginia's American Studies: Life Can Be Beautiful
