= Bright Horizon =

1941-1945 old-time radio soap opera

- Other names: The Story of Michael West
- Genre: Soap opera
- Running time: 15 minutes
- Country of origin: United States
- Language(s): English
- Starring: Richard Kollmar; Robert Griffin; Joseph Julian; Sammie Hill; Joan Alexander
- Announcer: Marjorie Anderson; Paul Luther; John Harper; Roland Winters; Grace Russell
- Written by: James Hart; Elizabeth Hart; John M. Young; Ted Maxwell; Stuart Hawkins; Kathleen Norris
- Directed by: Henry Hull; Charles Powers; Day Tuttle; Ralph Butler; Walter Allison Tibbals
- Produced by: Day Tuttle
- Original release: August 25, 1941 – July 6, 1945
- Sponsored by: Swan Soap

Bright Horizon is an old-time radio soap opera in the United States. It was broadcast on CBS from August 25, 1941 to July 6, 1945. The program initially had an alternate title, The Story of Michael West.

== Format ==
Bright Horizon was a spinoff of the Big Sister radio program. To help with the transition, Alice Frost, who played Ruth Wayne in the original series, was heard in the first episodes of the spinoff. Michael West, the main character in the new program, was a singer on Big Sister. With the switch to Bright Horizon, the character continued singing but also used his law degree "and gradually became more involved in a law career, at one time considering a run for governor."

In 1942, a review of the program in Billboard said, in part:

The quality is none too high on Bright Horizon, ... but at least the 15 minutes on the shot caught had enough action to sustain a sort of infantile interest, and the acting level was for the most part surprisingly high.

Bright Horizon was sponsored by Lever Brothers, advertising Swan Soap.

== Personnel ==
Characters in Bright Horizon and the actors and actresses who portrayed them are shown in the table below.

Character	Actor
Michael West	Richard Kollmar; Robert Griffin; Joseph Julian
Carol West	Sammie Hill; Joan Alexander
Larry	Frank Lovejoy
Margaret McCarey	Lesley Woods
Bobby	Ronald Liss
Barbara	Renee Terry
Keith Richards	Lon Clark
Lily	Alice Goodkin
Bonnie	Audrey Totter
Charles McCarey	Richard Keith
Penny	Will Geer
Edith Browning	Helen Claire
Bobby	Ronny Liss

Source: Radio Programs, 1924-1984: A Catalog of More Than 1800 Shows, except as noted.

Others heard on the program were Skip Homeier, Jackie Grimes, Santos Ortega and Chester Stratton.

Announcers were John Harper, Roland Winters, Grace Russell, Paul Luther and Marjorie Anderson. The organist was John Gart. Day Tuttle was the producer. Henry Hull, Charles Powers, Day Tuttle, Ralph Butler and Walter Allison Tibbals were the directors. Writers were James Hart, Elizabeth Hart, John M. Young, Ted Maxwell, Stuart Hawkins and Kathleen Norris.

== Sequel ==
After Bright Horizon's last broadcast, "the program was extended for a few months, with the name changed to A Woman's Life."

== See also ==
- List of radio soap operas
