= Les Misérables (radio series) =

1937 seven-part radio series

- Remastered release of Les Misérables (Smithsonian Historical Performances, 1995)
- Genre: Drama series
- Running time: 30 minutes
- Country of origin: United States
- Language: English
- Home station: Mutual Broadcasting System
- Hosted by: Orson Welles
- Starring: Orson Welles; Martin Gabel; Alice Frost; Virginia Nicolson
- Written by: Orson Welles (adaptation); Victor Hugo (novel)
- Directed by: Orson Welles
- Original release: July 23 – September 3, 1937
- No. of series: 1
- No. of episodes: 7

Les Misérables is a seven-part radio series broadcast July 23 – September 3, 1937 (Fridays at 10 p.m. ET), on the Mutual Network. Orson Welles adapted Victor Hugo's 1862 novel, directed the series, and starred as Jean Valjean. The 22-year-old Welles developed the idea of telling stories with first-person narration on the series, which was his first job as a writer-director for radio. The series was one of Welles's earliest and finest achievements on radio, and marked the radio debut of the Mercury Theatre.

== Production ==
Speaking to The New York Times, Welles described the forthcoming broadcast of Les Misérables as "a projection"—not a conventional adaptation by a playwright or script writer, but a new technique that would put the essential character of the novel itself on the air. "The aim is to make the script the work of Victor Hugo to the fullest extent", Welles said. Noting that radio would require that the novel be condensed, the Times reported that "a narrator will read the descriptive and background passages of the book; all dialogue will be read from the book by a group of actors .... Other theatrical effects, further differentiating the 'projection' from a mere reading, will be supplied by appropriate sound effects and Alfred Wallenstein's orchestra."

Marking the radio debut of the Mercury Theatre, Welles's Les Misérables was described by biographer Simon Callow as "one of his earliest, finest and most serious achievements on radio".

Film historian Bret Wood wrote that "Les Misérables is vitally important in the understanding of Welles's radio career because it displays his uncultivated understanding of the medium and some bold attempts to reject normal performance." He observed that as Les Misérables ends, "one has been made to understand something about the nature of the socio-economic differences which incited the French people to violent rebellion ... differences which were, in America, still in existence at the close of the Depression and onset of World War II."

The production costarred Martin Gabel as Javert; Alice Frost as Fantine; and Virginia Nicolson, Welles's first wife, as the adult Cosette. The supporting cast included Ray Collins, Agnes Moorehead, Everett Sloane, Betty Garde, Hiram Sherman, Frank Readick, Richard Widmark, Richard Wilson and William Alland. Welles served as narrator and played the principal character, Jean Valjean, as well as Champmathieu, a vagabond who is mistaken for Valjean.

== Episodes ==
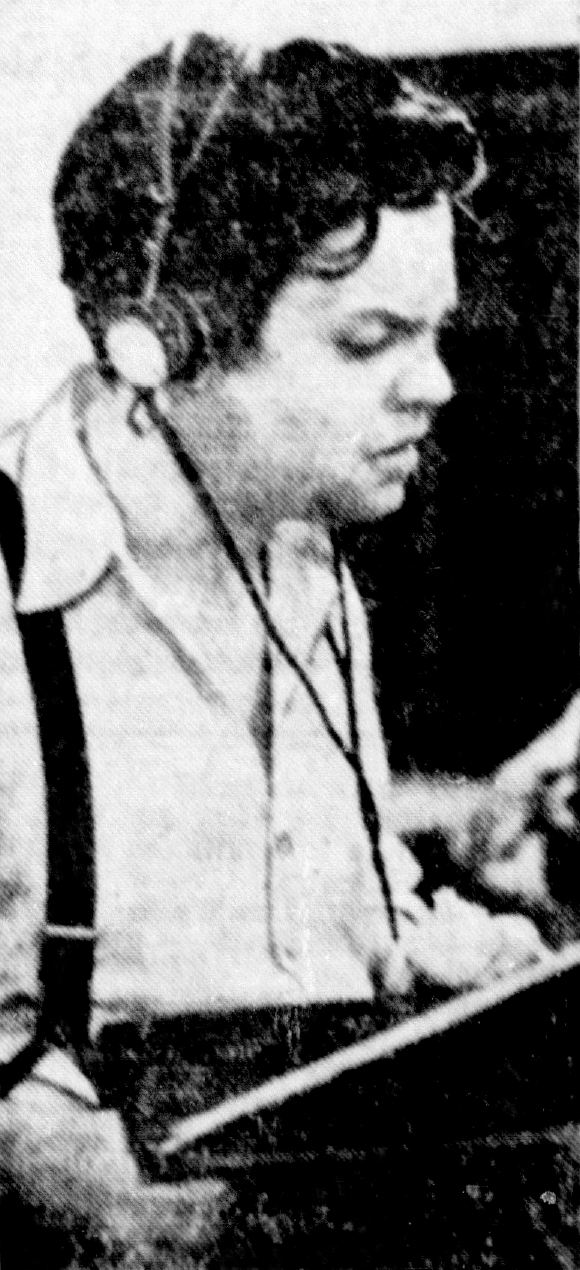
Orson Welles while acting in and directing the Mutual Radio presentation of Les Miserables (1937)

#	Date	Episode	Cast
1	July 23, 1937	"The Bishop"	Orson Welles (Jean Valjean), Alan Devitt (Judge), Agnes Moorehead (Old Woman, Madame Magloire), Frank Readick (Bishop of Digne), others
2	July 30, 1937	"Javert"	Hiram Sherman (Letter Deliverer, Factory Official, Idler who torments Fantine), Betty Garde (Favourite), Alice Frost (Fantine), Agnes Moorehead (Marguerite), Ray Collins (Traveling Dentist, Fauchelevent), Martin Gabel (Inspector Javert), Orson Welles (Jean Valjean [Monsieur Madeleine])
3	August 6, 1937	"The Trial"	William Johnstone (Bishop of Digne, Prosecutor), Hiram Sherman (Man who announces Javert, Judicial Clerk), Orson Welles (Jean Valjean [Monsieur Madeleine], Champmathieu), Martin Gabel (Inspector Javert), Alice Frost (Fantine), Adelaide Klein (Nun), Ray Collins (Judge), others; Milton Katims, musical director
4	August 13, 1937	"Cosette"	William Johnstone (Judge, Second Inn Customer), Orson Welles (Jean Valjean), Martin Gabel (Inspector Javert), Ray Collins (Thenardier), Agnes Moorehead (Madame Thenardier) Hiram Sherman (First Inn Customer), Estelle Levy (Cosette)
5	August 20, 1937	"The Grave"	William Johnstone (Police Officer, Marius Pontmercy), Everett Sloane (Police Lieutenant, Gyribier the Gravedigger), Ray Collins (Fauchelevent), Orson Welles (Jean Valjean), Estelle Levy (Cosette at age eight), Peggy Allenby (Prioress), Hiram Sherman (Priest at the Grave), Virginia Nicolson (Older Cosette), Martin Gabel (Inspector Javert)
6	August 27, 1937	"The Barricade"	Martin Gabel (Inspector Javert), Orson Welles (Jean Valjean), Virginia Nicolson (Cosette), Ray Collins (Police Officer, First Policeman), William Johnstone (Marius Pontmercy), Hiram Sherman (First Revolutionary, Second Policeman), others
7	September 3, 1937	"The Final Episode"	William Johnstone (Marius Pontmercy, Prosecutor), Orson Welles (Jean Valjean, Prisoner accused of being Jean Valjean), Ray Collins (Judge who sentences Valjean, Judge at Arras), Hiram Sherman ("Guilty!", Police Officer, Third Judge), Frank Readick (Bishop of Digne)

== See also ==
- Adaptations of Les Misérables
