= Lucille Wall =

American actress

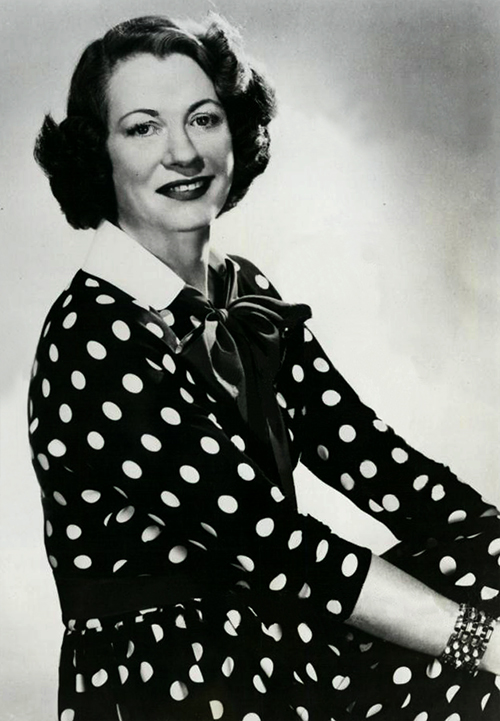
- Wall in 1952
- Born: Lucille Loretta Wall; January 18, 1898; Chicago, Illinois U.S.
- Died: July 11, 1986 (aged 88); Reno, Nevada, U.S.
- Other name: Polly Preston
- Occupations: Radio, television actress
- Relatives: Geraldine Wall (sister)

Lucille Loretta Wall (January 18, 1898 – July 11, 1986) was an American actress who played the role of Lucille March Weeks on the ABC soap opera General Hospital from 1963 to 1976. When Wall was ill in 1975, the role was played by Mary Grace Canfield, who was a quarter-century younger than Wall. Wall returned to the show for infrequent guest appearances over the years, the last in 1982.

== Early years ==
Wall was born in Chicago, Illinois. Actress Geraldine Wall was her sister, and she had another sister, Mildred. During her teenage years, Wall leaned toward a career in music, but she eventually turned toward radio for her career.

== Stage ==
Wall was active with a stock theater company headed by actress and playwright Jane Cowl. She also "had several seasons on Broadway."

== Radio ==
Wall debuted on radio on WJZ in 1927, using the name Polly Preston as she acted on Collier's Hour.

Using her own name, she had the title role on the radio soap opera, Portia Faces Life (1944-1951). She simultaneously played the role of Belle Jones on the radio soap opera Lorenzo Jones. She also portrayed Winifred Wilbur in Your Family and Mine and had the title role in The Adventures of Barbara Wayne. Wall also acted in Pretty Kitty Kelly, Island Boat Club, Sherlock Holmes, True Confessions, The First Nighter and A Tale of Today.

== Death ==
Wall died at a convalescent home in Reno, Nevada, on July 11, 1986, at age 88.
