= Betty Garde =

American actress (1905–1989)

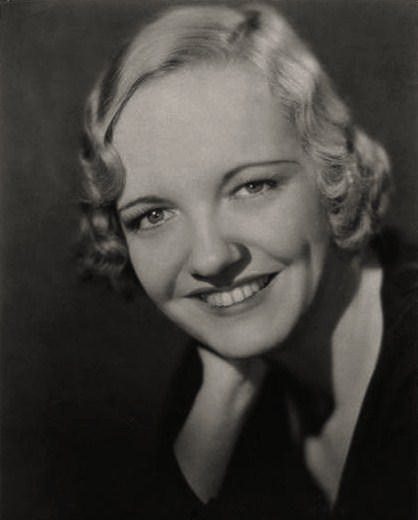
- Garde in 1930
- Born: Katharine Elizabeth Garde; September 19, 1905; Philadelphia, Pennsylvania, U.S.
- Died: December 25, 1989 (aged 84); Sherman Oaks, California, U.S.
- Resting place: Westminster Cemetery, Bala Cynwyd, Pennsylvania
- Education: University of Pennsylvania
- Occupation: Actress
- Years active: 1925–1971
- Spouse: Frank Lennon (m. 1943; died 1987)

Katharine Elizabeth Garde (September 19, 1905 – December 25, 1989) was an American stage, radio, film and television actress.

== Early years ==
Born in Philadelphia, Garde was starring in productions of South Philadelphia's Broadway Players by age 15. She attended the University of Pennsylvania.

== Stage ==
On the stage since the early 1920s, Garde made her Broadway debut as Alma Borden in Easy Come, Easy Go (1925–1926) and played character roles in productions including The Social Register (1931–1932) and The Primrose Path (1939). A tall woman, standing 5'10", she was cast as Aunt Eller in the original 1943 Broadway production of Oklahoma! She also portrayed Mrs. Gordon in Agatha Sue, I Love You (1966).

== Radio ==
After joining CBS in 1933, Garde began to work extensively in radio, performing on some three dozen shows including Lorenzo Jones, Mrs. Wiggs of the Cabbage Patch, The Big Story, The Eddie Cantor Show (on which she played "all the women roles"), Front Page Farrell, Maudie's Diary, Perry Mason, Theatre Guild on the Air and The Fat Man. In 1934 Garde worked with Orson Welles on the CBS Radio series The American School of the Air, and she later performed in Welles' radio series including Les Misérables, The Mercury Theatre on the Air, The Campbell Playhouse and Ceiling Unlimited.

== Film ==
Garde's first three credited Hollywood film roles are in the early "talkies" The Lady Lies (1929), Damaged Love (1930), and Queen High (1930). Among her more notable later performances are in the film noir productions Call Northside 777 (1948), in which she plays a prosecution witness whose testimony convicts an innocent man; in Cry of the City (1948) as Miss Pruett; and in Caged (1950), as a murderous prison inmate.

== Television ==
Her television credits include playing Belle Starr on the January 27, 1952 episode of The Gabby Hayes Show. Garde also made appearances on The Honeymooners as the Kramdens' maid, Thelma; on The Real McCoys as a farmer, Aggie Larkin; on The Untouchables, as a maid in an episode starring Elizabeth Montgomery ("The Rusty Heller Story"); and on two episodes of The Twilight Zone, including "The Midnight Sun", opposite Lois Nettleton.

== Death ==
Betty Garde died December 25, 1989, at the age of 84 in a hospital in Sherman Oaks, California. No cause was given and there were no immediate survivors.

== Filmography ==
Film
Year	Title	Role	Notes
1929	The Lady Lies	Hilda Pearson	
1930	Queen High	Florence Cole	
1931	Damaged Love	Madge Sloan	
1931	The Girl Habit	Hattie Henry	
1948	Call Northside 777	Wanda Skutnik	Alternative title: Calling Northside 777
1948	Cry of the City	Miss Pruett	
1950	Caged	Kitty Stark	
1951	The Prince Who Was a Thief	Mirza	
1955	One Desire	Mrs. O'Dell	
1962	The Wonderful World of the Brothers Grimm	Miss Bettenhausen	
Television
Year	Title	Role	Notes
1950	The Big Story	Annie	1 episode
1950–1951	Suspense		3 episodes
1950	The Big Story	Annie	1 episode
1950–1951	Suspense		3 episodes
1952	The Gabby Hayes Show	Belle Starr	1 episode
1955	The Honeymooners	Thelma	1 episode
1955–1959	The United States Steel Hour	Mom; Mrs. Flynn	2 episodes
1956	General Electric Theater	Annie	1 episode
1956	The Edge of Night	Mattie Lane Grimsley	Unknown episodes
1957	Decoy	Landlady	1 episode
1957–1959	As the World Turns	Miss Tyler	Unknown episodes
1959	Mr. Lucky	Maybelle Towers	1 episode
1959–1960	The Real McCoys	Aggie Larkin	2 episodes
1959–1960	The Untouchables	Norma Guzik; Alice	2 episodes
1960	The Chevy Mystery Show	Mrs. Andrews	1 episode
1960	Adventures in Paradise	Queen Atea	1 episode
1961	The Islanders	Mme. Arbedutian	1 episode
1961	Shirley Temple's Storybook	The Flowerwoman	1 episode
1961	Checkmate	Sara	1 episode
1961	Route 66	Lydia Sullivan	1 episode
1961	The Twilight Zone	Passenger; Mrs. Bronson	2 episodes
1962	Ben Casey	Florabelle Hanks	1 episode
1962	Car 54, Where Are You?	Ma Dearheart	1 episode
1971	All the Way Home	Aunt Sadie Follet	Television movie
