= Lillian Lauferty =

American journalist

- Died: 1958 (aged 67–68)
- Citizenship: American
- Alma mater: Smith College
- Occupations: Journalist, script writer
- Spouse: James Wolfe (m. 1924)
- Writing career
- Pen name: Beatrice Fairfax
- Language: English
- Genre: Radio soap opera
- Subject: Advice column
- Notable works: Big Sister; Your Family and Mine

Lillian Lauferty (May 1882 – 1958) was an American writer whose works appeared in newspapers, magazines, and radio scripts. She was perhaps best known for her newspaper columns published with the byline Beatrice Fairfax.

== Education ==
Lauferty graduated from Fort Wayne High School in Fort Wayne, Indiana with the Class of 1899. She was an alumna of Smith College with the Class of 1903.

== Ethnicity and intermarriage ==
Lauferty's great-grandmother was Hannah Rothschild, a niece of Mayer Amschel Rothschild, founder of the Rothschild banking dynasty. The family severed ties with Hannah when she married a French Christian. Lauferty herself came from a mixed parentage, having a Jewish father and a Roman Catholic mother. A 1930 newspaper article reported, however, "Miss Lauferty has again become an integral part of the Jewish people, inasmuch as she is the wife of James Wolfe, noted basso of the Metropolitan Opera Company." She and Wolfe married in October 1924.

== Career ==
Prompted by newspaper editor Arthur Brisbane, Lauferty became a journalist when she was 19, working as a reporter for the New York Evening Journal. Much of her writing for newspapers was in the form of advice-to-the-lovelorn columns. She wrote the "Ask Beatrice Fairfax" advice column after Marie Manning, the originator, stopped writing them in 1920. Lauferty continued until 1927.

Lauferty began writing for radio in the 1930s. Her work in that medium included creating the soap opera Big Sister (1936) and writing scripts for it; and she wrote for Your Family and Mine (1938). She also acted on two radio series and was mistress of ceremonies on You and Your Happiness.

Lauferty's work was also published in magazines, including Collier's, Cosmopolitan, Liberty, and Redbook.

Books by Lauferty included a novelization of Edward Henry Peple's A Pair of Sixes (1914), The Hungry House (1943), and Baritone (1948). Mrs. Lauferty died on February 17, 1958, at the age of 68.
