= The Ginny Simms Show =

- Other names: Johnny Presents; The Purple Heart Show; Talent Theater; Ginny Simms Song Book
- Genre: Musical variety
- Country of origin: United States
- Language: English
- Syndicates: CBS; NBC
- Hosted by: Ginny Simms
- Announcer: Don Wilson; Frank Bingman
- Original release: September 19, 1941 – March 18, 1951
- Sponsored by: Philip Morris; Borden milk

The Ginny Simms Show is an umbrella title that can refer to any of several radio musical variety shows in the United States. The versions were broadcast on CBS and NBC beginning September 19, 1941, and ending March 18, 1951.

== Background ==
Beginning as Johnny Presents, the program went through several iterations over its lifespan. (The initial sponsor was Philip Morris cigarettes; Johnny was the product spokesman.) The title was changed to Johnny Presents Ginny Simms in 1943. It later became The Purple Heart Show to focus on servicemen who were wounded in World War II. Talent Theater followed, as Simms presented military men who had been in show business before the war and wanted to find jobs in that field again. Eventually The Ginny Simms Show evolved.

The one constant throughout all of the versions was Ginny Simms, singer and hostess, who had been a featured vocalist with Kay Kyser's orchestra before she went out on her own.

Borden Milk sponsored The Ginny Simms Show in 1945-1947. Don Wilson was the announcer of the half-hour show, and guest singers joined Simms. Frank DeVol led the orchestra. In December 1946, Donald O'Connor became the program's regular comedian. Ginny Simms Song Book was broadcast in 1950-1951. It was 15 minutes long, with Frank Graham as the announcer and music by the Buddy Cole Trio. Also known as the Ginny Simms Song Shop, the program was produced and written by Betty Jones. Its guest stars included Curt Massey and Eddie Bracken.

Other individuals and groups who were involved with the program included writer Milton Merlin, Ray Block and his orchestra, the Bombardiers Chorus, Edgar Fairchild and his orchestra, and announcer Frank Bingman.

== Format ==
On April 7, 1945, the trade publication Billboard reported on four phases of evolution of the program's format:

1. Early in World War II, Simms interviewed men in camps.
2. As time went on, she focused on men who had returned from overseas.
3. The emphasis then changed to her interviewing men who had been wounded.
4. By 1945, each of the show's broadcasts included a performance by a discharged serviceman who sought a career in entertainment.
