= Lorenzo Jones =

American daytime radio series

Lorenzo Jones' wife Belle was portrayed by Lucille Wall, seen in this caricature by announcer Norman Sweetser.

Lorenzo Jones was a daytime radio series which aired on NBC in different timeslots over an 18-year span.

Produced by Frank and Anne Hummert, the series could be classified with its own unique category of "comedy soap opera", highlighted by organist Rosa Rio's rollicking rendition of the opening theme music, "Funiculi, Funicula". During the early 1950s, the 15-minute program served as a comedy lead-in to Bob and Ray. Each episode opened with this introduction:

We all know couples like lovable, impractical Lorenzo Jones and his devoted wife, Belle. Lorenzo's inventions have made him a character to the town, but not to Belle, who loves him. Their struggle for security is anybody's story, but somehow, with Lorenzo, it has more smiles than tears... and now, let's smile awhile with Lorenzo Jones and his wife, Belle.

== Characters and story ==
The daydreaming Lorenzo Jones (Karl Swenson) was employed as an auto mechanic at a garage owned by Jim Barker (John Brown, Frank Behrens). Barker's wife Irma (Mary Wickes, Grace Keddy, Nancy Sheridan) had her own opinions about Lorenzo's inventions. Lorenzo's friend Sandy Matson (Joseph Julian) listened patiently as Lorenzo told him how fame and fortune were just around the corner, even though Lorenzo's dreams and schemes rarely surfaced in the marketplace. However, his wife Belle (Betty Garde, Lucille Wall) always remained faithful as Lorenzo devised such curiosities as an outdoor vacuum cleaner and a teapot with three spouts (for strong, medium and weak tea).

Lorenzo and Belle were able to buy their rented house after his invention of an automatic foot-warmer became a success, bringing them $2500. During the early 1950s, when science fiction became increasingly popular, Lorenzo spent many days attempting to construct a rocket ship in his basement. As time passed, the plots became a bit more like conventional soap operas, notably during a story arc in which Lorenzo was kidnapped by jewel thieves, received a blow to the head and wandered about with amnesia for more than a year.

== Program ==
The program was launched by NBC at 4 pm on April 26, 1937, airing in that time period until the following year. In 1938–39, it was heard at 11:15 am, moving to 4:30 pm (1939–51), then to 5:30 pm (1951-54), concluding the series run at 5:15 pm (1954–55). From 1937 to 1949, the sponsors were Phillips Milk of Magnesia and Bayer Aspirin, followed by Procter & Gamble (1949–55).

The show was scripted by Ted Ferro (who also collaborated on the Barnaby comic strip in 1946-47) and his wife, Mathilde Ferro. The announcers were Don Lowe, Norman Sweetser and George Putnam. Directors included Stephen Gross and Ernest Ricca. This show is widely acclaimed in the novel In Country.

== Cultural legacy ==
Lorenzo Jones served as an example of an inventor in the oral arguments of the 2009 Supreme Court case in re Bilski.
