= Big Sister (radio series) =

1936-1952 radio drama series

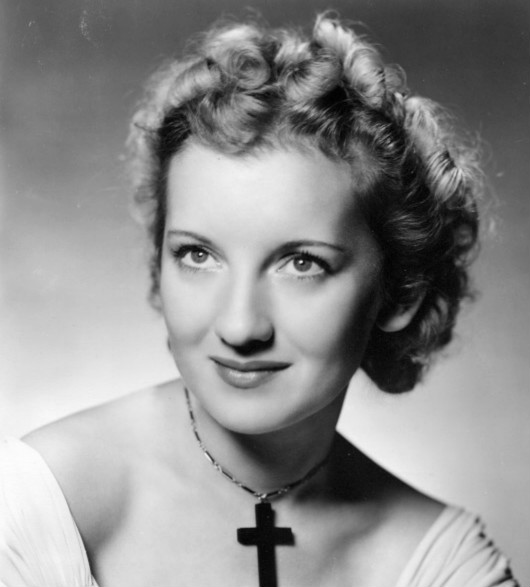
- Alice Frost had the title role on Big Sister
- Genre: Soap opera
- Country of origin: United States
- Language: English
- Syndicates: CBS
- Starring: Alice Frost; Nancy Marshall; Marjorie Armstrong; Mercedes McCambridge; Grace Matthews
- Announcer: Fred Uttal; Jim Ameche; Hugh Conover
- Created by: Lillian Lauferty
- Written by: Lillian Lauferty; Julian Funt; Carl Bixby; Bob Newman; Bill Sweets
- Directed by: Mitchell Grayson; William Tuttle; Theodore Huston; Thomas F. Victor; Betsy Tuthill
- Original release: September 14, 1936 – December 26, 1952
- Opening theme: Valse Bluette
- Sponsored by: Lever Brothers (Rinso); Procter & Gamble

Big Sister is a daytime radio drama series created by Lillian Lauferty and broadcast on CBS from September 14, 1936, to December 26, 1952. It was sponsored by Lever Brothers for Rinso until 1946 when Procter & Gamble became the sponsor.

Set in the fictional town of Glen Falls, the program dramatized the life of Ruth Evans who sacrificed her own happiness to care for her younger sister Sue and their crippled brother Neddie. After Sue married reporter Jerry Miller, Ruth continued to care for Neddie. She fell in love with Neddie's doctor, John Wayne, who cured Neddie. Ruth and John married on October 19, 1939, but during World War II, John was held in a Japanese prison camp. He returned to Glen Falls suffering from shell-shock. John was played by Staats Cotsworth, Martin Gabel, and Paul McGrath.

The actresses who portrayed Ruth over the decades were Alice Frost, Nancy Marshall, Marjorie Anderson and Mercedes McCambridge. Sue was played by Haila Stoddard, Dorothy McGuire, Peggy Conklin and Fran Carlon. Michael O'Day was heard in the role of little Neddie Evans. In 1940, ZaSu Pitts joined the cast as Mamie Wayne.

Over the years the program's writers, in addition to Lauferty, were Julian Funt, Carl Bixby, Bob Newman and Bill Sweets. Announcers for the program were Fred Uttal, Jim Ameche and Hugh Conover. Organist Richard Leibert furnished the background music and the opening theme, "Valse Bluette". Ameche's son, Jim Ameche, Jr., played Richard, the son of John and Ruth Wayne.

In an indication of the program's popularity, listeners sent truckloads of wedding presents to the CBS studio when characters Ruth Evans and Dr. John Wayne were married. (Note: James Thurber cited the event in Soapland, his series of articles in the New Yorker about the detrimental psychological effects of soap operas.) Its success led to a spin-off radio series, Bright Horizon, which CBS began broadcasting in 1941. To attract audience to the new show, Alice Frost reprised her role as Ruth Evans Wayne in early episodes of Bright Horizon.
