= Code-O-Graph =

The Code-O-Graph is a field cipher device and identifier from the Captain Midnight radio serial. In the story line they were used by agents of the Secret Squadron, a paramilitary organization headed by Captain Midnight. In addition to their use as devices in the radio program, they were offered as radio premiums for listeners. As radio premiums, listeners sent in an Ovaltine proof of purchase with their names and addresses.

The Code-O-Graph incorporates a cipher disk, a cryptological device, but the letters in the message were substituted by numbers, probably to avoid ambiguity for broadcast messages. On the radio show, usually once a week, a message would be sent that could be deciphered by listeners. Each message, only a few words long, was invariably a clue to the upcoming episode.

== Models ==
The first Code-O-Graph, called the "Mystery Dial" unit, was introduced in 1941, as a device to enable Secret Squadron agents in the field to send and receive secure messages. It was in badge form, as were the next three models. The front of the badge displayed the number and cipher alphabet scales. The reverse had two windows, one labeled "Master Code"; the other, "Super Code." each window was used for cipher key settings. As an example, if the cipher was designated as "Master Code 3," it meant that the movable rotor was to spun so that the number 3 would appear in the window labeled "Master Code." This setting would align the number and cipher alphabet scales correctly to decipher a message.

The second Code-O-Graph was the "Photo-Matic" unit. The badge had a space for a picture of the owner, to make it a photo-ID badge.

The advent of World War II affected the Code-O-Graph availability: the two previous models were made of brass, and the attack on Pearl Harbor, which propelled the United States into World War II, caused the U.S. Government to impose restrictions on manufacturing materials. Copper and brass were considered critical materials, and most of the materials were diverted to war activities. This precluded brass being used to manufacture novelties like radio premiums.

The Photo-Matic Code-O-Graph, although not distributed until 1942, was manufactured prior to the Pearl Harbor attack. Since it, and its predecessor, were undated, the newer Code-O-Graph was used for the 1943 and 1944 seasons as well as the 1942, making it the Code-O-Graph with the longest service life. The cipher setting scheme was similar to the 1941 Mystery Dial model, but there was only one cipher setting window, labeled "Master Code."

By late 1944, Ovaltine scraped together enough material to manufacture another Code-O-Graph, the 1945 "Magni-Magic" Code-O-Graph. This unit used stamped sheet steel for the badge bodies, painted with "gold" paint to look similar to the earlier brass badges. The cipher disk element was made of injection-molded plastic, with the center of the disk knob in the form of a magnifying lens. The production was limited, and it was the only model of which supplies were completely exhausted.

The 1945 model altered the cipher-key setting scheme. The new method was to align one of the letters on the alphabet scale to a numeral on the number scale. For instance, the "Master Code X-15" setting meant that the letter X would be moved until it was next to the number 15 on the number scale. The advantage with the new scheme was that a total of 676 possible key setting combinations could be used. The disadvantage was that each key compromised one letter-number pair.

The 1946 model was the "Mirro-Flash" unit, the first postwar Code-O-Graph, and the last in badge form. Since the war had ended, the new badge was made of stamped sheet brass, and the plastic "dial" element had a small circular mirror for signaling by heliography. It used the same cipher-key setting methodology as its immediate predecessor. This practice was used for the 1947 and 1949 models as well.

The 1947 model was the first in non-badge form. It was in the shape of a police-style whistle, with the cipher elements along one side. It was called the "Whistle Code-O-Graph," possibly the least imaginative name of the series.

The 1948 model, the "Mirro-Magic" unit, was a circular product, manufactured of brass, aluminum, plastic, and steel. The cipher letters and numbers could only be seen one at a time through windows on the front. The design had the cipher alphabet and number disks coupled by friction, and there was often slippage when trying to decipher a message. Unlike any other Code-O-Graph, the cipher-key settings utilized a pointer on the back, and a number scale from 1 through 26. Each would increment the positioning of the two scales.

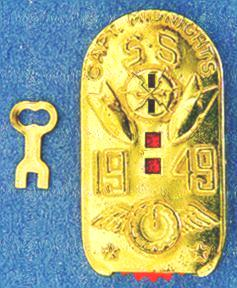
1941 Key-O-Matic Code-O-Graph

The last Code-O-Graph was the "Key-O-Matic" unit. Possibly to compensate for the slippage of the 1948 unit's elements, the cipher alphabet and number scales were placed on interlocking gears, preventing any slippage. Resetting the cipher elements utilized a small key that was inserted into slots over one of the gears, which could be disengaged, using the key and a leaf spring as a simple clutch mechanism.

== References in popular culture ==
A Code-O-Graph-like secret decoder ring was featured in the 1983 movie A Christmas Story as an object of both joy and frustration. Richard Farina - Been Down So Long It Looks Like Up To Me (1966) - talks about it in Chapter one, listing it first in the list of the "only possessions and necessities of his life." (p. 4, in the 1983 Penguin edition)
