= Box Top =

A box top is the top part of a box.

Box Top or variation may also refer to:

- Boxtop, a proof of purchase
- "Boxtop" (song), a 1958 song by Ike Turner
- The Box Tops, a U.S. rock band
- Box Tops for Education, a program from General Mills

== See also ==
- Box (disambiguation)
- Top (disambiguation)
