= The Air Adventures of Jimmie Allen =

1933–1937 American radio serial

The Air Adventures of Jimmie Allen is an American radio adventure serial broadcast from 1933 until 1937. The 15-minute syndicated program was created by writers Robert M. Burtt and Wilfred G. Moore, both of whom were from Kansas City, Missouri.

== Background ==
In 1933, Burtt was working as a freelance writer, while Moore was working the sports desk of the Kansas City Star and writing occasional scripts for the Star's affiliated radio station WDAF. Both Burtt and Moore had been flying aces in World War I. At a party in Kansas City, the two former pilots came up with the idea of a radio series targeted at children and teenagers concerning a 16-year-old pilot and his adventures flying around the world, primarily solving mysteries and crimes and participating in air show races. Burtt and Moore then wrote the initial script about Jimmie Allen, a young telegraph messenger at the Airways Station near Kansas City. A gruff man asks him to send a coded telegram. Later Allen is told that a plane carrying a million dollars to a bank is on its way. Allen figures out the plane is to be hijacked, so he joins his pilot friend, Speed Robertson, in a plan to thwart the hijacking. Moore brought the finished pilot script to WDAF where station manager Dean Fitzer promptly put the program into production.

== First series ==
The Jimmie Allen program was first broadcast February 23, 1933, initially over three Midwestern radio stations, WDAF in Kansas City, KLZ in Denver, Colorado, and KVOO in Tulsa, Oklahoma. The initial transcriptions for the program were made in World Broadcasting System Chicago studios. Over the years, the show was produced in a variety of recording studios in Hollywood, New York and Chicago.

In following episodes, Speed and Jimmie, in their attempt to thwart the hijacking, are captured but escape in a small plane which crashes, and then are recaptured. Throughout this initial story arc, Robertson is Jimmie's mentor. He does all the flying and continually teaches Allen a trick or two that he learned in World War I. After an exciting aerial dogfight near the end of the story, Robertson reveals that the FBI has made him a G-Man. In subsequent episodes of the series, Jimmie expresses interest in becoming a pilot and enrolls in flying school. Numerous exciting adventures follow, full of danger and mystery.

Burtt and Moore wove the plot around the character of a self-reliant youth of fine habits: resourceful, courageous, capable of thinking his way through danger and holding firmly to "fine American ideals." They never deviated from that theme of the character, and they surrounded their hero with friends and enemies who personified other traits that would emphasize the character of their hero.

== Premiums and promotions ==
Soon after the first broadcast, seven more radio stations were added to the Jimmie Allen show's roster, and Skelly Oil found itself involved in one of the great promotions of early radio. A Jimmie Allen Flying Club was created: all a kid had to do was apply at any Skelly station. Applicants received many radio premiums, highly treasured today --- a set of wings, a membership emblem and a "personal letter" from Jimmie Allen. Other giveaways included a Jimmie Allen picture puzzle (a Skelly truck refueling a light airplane), a "secret service whistle" and a Jimmie Allen album. The club newspaper was sent to 600,000 listeners a week, and Jimmie Allen Air Races --- attended by tens of thousands of people --- were held in major Midwest cities where the show was heard. Because of John Frank's age, 16-year-old Murray McLean stepped in when personal appearances of Jimmie Allen were scheduled. Skelly had to hire a special staff just to answer the mail. Flying lessons, model planes and other promotions were part of the mix, available to listeners who displayed their club credentials at their Skelly Oil station.

Comer remained in the background most of the time but kept close check on the serial as it was developed. He never sold the show to a network (which is the main reason why its history has remained so vague). By marketing the show himself (to the Richfield Oil Company on the West Coast and to scores of individual businesses elsewhere), he kept control of it. When Comer would see the serial taking a direction that was contrary to what he believed he could sell readily to a sponsor, he came up with an idea or suggestion that ran counter to the ideas of the authors. An argument would begin, with Comer producing here and there, and in the end the serial came around the way he wanted it. When the production was ready for recording, it fell naturally to Comer to take over production rights, with the authors reserving, of course, their royalty rights.

Throughout the 1930s, interest was high. Boys were fascinated by the adventures of Jimmie, Speed and their mechanic Flash Lewis. Together they solved mysteries (even murder, unusual for juvenile fare at that time, when Jimmie's passenger Quackenbush died under mysterious circumstances), went on hunts for treasure and raced in air shows around the country. Their enemies were Black Pete and Digger Dawson. A Big Little Book, Jimmie Allen and the Great Air Mail Robbery, was based on the show's earliest scripts by Burtt and Moore. The serial was adapted to film with The Sky Parade (1936), a Paramount feature about the post-war adventures of WWI pilots. The film featured some of the cast from the radio show playing different parts.

The popularity began to wane in 1937 when it was dropped by Skelly Oil. Production ceased, and Comer began focusing his attention on a new Burtt and Moore-authored boy-pilot series, Captain Midnight (which featured Jimmie Allen announcer Ed Prentiss as the title character). Repeats of the "Air Adventures of Jimmie Allen" continued to air on radio stations across the country and in Australia, Canada, and New Zealand until 1943.

== Second series ==
During World War II, Russell Comer came up with the idea of starting a brand-new industry for the production of radio broadcast dramas in his hometown of Kansas City. He felt that, with the proper recording equipment, top-notch radio serials could be produced in Kansas City using local radio talent and that a possible revision of The Air Adventures of Jimmie Allen would be the way to attract sponsors to supporting this industry. Comer and director John Frank looked through old 1930s Jimmie Allen scripts to see what would have to be changed to make an updated version of the series. They found that it would simply be a matter of changing terminology and bringing in post-WWII aviation developments such as jet propulsion. Comer soon obtained the necessary equipment to record the show and set up a small recording studio in his downtown Kansas City advertising offices.

Comer and Frank endeavored to assemble an entirely new cast for this new edition. For the lead role of Jimmie, it was Jack Anthony, a young announcer for radio station KCKN (defunct) in Kansas City. The role of Speed Robertson went to Shelby Storck, who had been a newscaster for WDAF and was then in public relations work. The role of Speed and Jimmie's mechanic Flash Lewis went to Al Christy, a WDAF announcer who later went on to appear on the TV shows Bonanza and Punky Brewster, as well as in the films In Cold Blood and Mr. and Mrs. Bridge. Other Kansas City radio announcers played supporting roles, and it is apparent, listening to these episodes, that some of the same actors were playing several different roles, with slightly different accents.

Comer sold this new edition of the series to the International Shoe Company of St. Louis and several oil companies, and the first broadcast occurred on October 14, 1946, over KFH in Wichita, Kansas. It first aired on a Kansas City station on January 1, 1947. Though the lead actors were all capable and the scripts were all fairly exciting and well written, the show did not receive enough promotion and did not achieve the fascination of the 1930s series. By the end of 1947, after the production of more than 400 episodes, the program was cancelled. Repeats of the 1946-47 edition of Jimmie Allen continued to air until the mid-1950s.

The program's history remained vague until a Jimmie Allen advocate named Walter House published a detailed two-part article about the show in a model-airplane magazine during the 1980s. More recently, an MP3 CD featuring 131 episodes (from 1936 to 1937 and 1946–47) was released. The 1930s episodes suffer from extremely poor sound quality, but the post-war episodes sound just as they must have on the airwaves in the 1940s.

== Sources ==
Graham, Charles W., "'Jimmie Allen' Comes Home as Basis of New Radio Enterprise," Kansas City Star, December 1, 1946.

== Listen to ==
- Zoot Radio: The Air Adventures of Jimmie Allen (123 episodes)
