= Glenn Riggs =

American radio announcer (1907–1975)

- Born: Glenn Everett Riggs; July 24, 1907; East McKeesport, Pennsylvania, U.S.
- Died: September 12, 1975 (aged 68); Málaga, Spain
- Spouse: Elizabeth A. Laird (1913-1968)
- Presenting career
- Show: Vic and Sade; The Adventures of Jungle Jim; The Three R's; Hop Harrigan; Ethel and Albert; Boston Blackie; Philco Radio Time
- Stations: KDKA, Pittsburgh
- Network: Blue Network/ABC
- Network: Mutual
- Country: United States

Glenn Everett Riggs (July 24, 1907 – September 12, 1975) was an American radio announcer.

== Early years ==
Riggs was the youngest of two children born to parents Edwin E. (April 15, 1874–August 1, 1968) and Pearl Riggs on July 24, 1907 in East McKeesport, Pennsylvania. He had an older sister named Cora Corley (1904-1991).

== Career ==
Riggs' voice could be heard on various radio programs throughout the 1930s, 1940s, and 1950s. Some of those radio programs included Vic and Sade, The Adventures of Jungle Jim, The Three R's, Hop Harrigan, Ethel and Albert, Boston Blackie, and Philco Radio Time.

Riggs was also famous for being the announcer for Bing Crosby for more than a decade.

In 1958, Riggs was an announcer on the game show Make Me Laugh.

== Recordings ==
In 1957, Riggs and Paul Wing recorded Peter Rabbitt, Goldilocks and Other Great Tales for Growing Boys and Girls (RCA Victor LBY 1001).

== Death ==
Riggs and his wife Elizabeth are buried at Memorial Cemetery of Saint John's Church in Laurel Hollow, New York.
