= Ann Burton (disambiguation) =

Ann Burton (1933–1989) was a Dutch singer.

Ann or Anne Burton may also refer to:

- Ann Burton (Ann of the Airlanes), a fictional character
- Ann Burton (abortion rights activist) (born 1960)
- Anne Burton (writer), pen name of Sara Woods

== See also ==
- Burton (surname)
