= Hop Harrigan (serial) =

1946 film by Derwin Abrahams

- Film poster
- Directed by: Derwin Abrahams
- Written by: Jon L. Blummer (adapted from the comic strip by); Ande Lamb (original screenplay); George H. Plympton (original screenplay)
- Based on: Hop Harrigan comic strip by: Jon L. Blummer
- Produced by: Sam Katzman
- Starring: William Bakewell; Jennifer Holt; Robert 'Buzz' Henry; Sumner Getchell
- Cinematography: Ira H. Morgan
- Edited by: Earl Turner
- Music by: Lee Zahler
- Production company: Sam Katzman Productions
- Distributed by: Columbia Pictures
- Release date: March 28, 1946
- Running time: 15 chapter serial
- Country: United States
- Language: English

Hop Harrigan (aka Hop Harrigan America's Ace of the Airways) (1946) is a Columbia film serial, based on the Hop Harrigan comic books by DC Comics. The serial comprised 15 two-reel chapters with Derwin Abrahams as the director and Sam Katzman, the producer. Columbia Pictures was one of the last Hollywood studios to continue in the postwar years with the serial format. By 1947, Universal Pictures discontinued its serials, with only Republic Pictures and Columbia continuing with serials. The last serial was Columbia's Blazing the Overland Trail (1956).

== Plot ==
Hop Harrigan (William Bakewell), a top Air Corps pilot, leaves the military, and he and his mechanic, "Tank" Tinker (Sumner Getchell), open up a small charter air service. They are hired by J. Westly Arnold (Emmett Vogan) to fly an inventor, Dr. Tobor (John Merton), to his secret laboratory, where he is working on a new and powerful energy machine.

A mysterious villain named "The Chief Pilot" (Wheeler Oakman), however, is also determined to have the new energy machine for his own purposes. He uses a destructive raygun to cripple Hop's aircraft and kidnaps Dr. Tobor. Hop and Tank, aided by Gail Nolan (Jennifer Holt) and her younger brother, Jackie (Robert "Buzz" Henry), finally overcome the criminals, only find a bigger threat to them all within their group.

Dr. Tobor is insane and has a hideous plan to destroy the Earth. Only Hop can stop him.

=== Chapter titles ===
1. A Mad Mission
2. The Secret Ray
3. The Mystery Plane
4. Plunging Peril
5. Betrayed by a Madman
6. A Flaming Trap
7. One Chance for Life
8. White Fumes of Fate
9. Dr. Tobor's Revenge
10. Juggernaut of Fate
11. Flying to Oblivion
12. Lost in the Skies
13. No Escape
14. The Chute that Failed
15. The Fate of the World

== Cast ==
- William Bakewell as Hop Harrigan (Note: Bakewell is older than the character he is playing, but a "convincing" enough hero.)
- Jennifer Holt as Gail Nolan
- Robert 'Buzz' Henry as Jackie Nolan
- Sumner Getchell as "Tank" Tinker
- Emmett Vogan as J. Westly Arnold
- Claire James as Gwen Arnold
- John Merton as Dr. Tobor
- Wheeler Oakman as Alex Ballard/The Chief Pilot
- Ernie Adams as Retner
- Peter Michael as Mark Craven
- Terry Frost as Barry
- Anthony Warde as Edwards
- Jackie Moran as Fraser
- Bobby Stone as Gray
- Jack Buchanon as Deputy Sheriff

== Production ==
Hop Harrigan was based on Jon L. Blummer's All-American Comics and associated radio series. The serial featured location shooting at an airport, but relied heavily on studio sets. The aircraft in Hop Harrigan included a Boeing-Stearman Kaydet, Bellanca Cruisair and a Stinson Junior.

== Reception ==
Author and film critic, Andrew C. Cline, wrote in In the Nick of Time (1984) that Hop Harrigan is a fairly action-filled serial, with well-paced action.

== See also ==
- List of film serials by year
- List of film serials by studio

Preceded by Who's Guilty? (1945)	Columbia Serial; Hop Harrigan (1946)	Succeeded by Chick Carter, Detective (1946)
