= The Life and Love of Dr. Susan =

1939 Soap opera broadcast on CBS

The Life and Love of Dr. Susan was a radio soap opera broadcast on CBS in 1939. It was sponsored by Lux Flakes and was the first radio program to include jingles.

== Characters and story ==
Eleanor Phelps starred as Dr. Susan Chandler, a physician who was married with two children, twins Marilyn and Dickie (Gloria Mann and Tommy Hughes). After her husband disappears on a South American jungle expedition (a not-uncommon fate for soap opera characters), Dr. Susan returned to her hometown of Valleydale to help her father-in-law practice medicine. Fred Barron appeared as her brother-in-law, Dr. Howard Chandler, while Mary Cecil played her mother-in-law, Miranda Chandler.

Frank Luther served as the show's announcer (often singing parts of the commercials, quoting popular songs of the day), with Ed Rice as the director and Edith Meiser as head writer.

== Airdates and availability ==
Dr. Susan aired for fifteen minutes on CBS at 2:15 pm Eastern Time, from February 13 through December 29, 1939.

Only one episode exists: the one airing on September 21, 1939 and thus preserved on the WJSV broadcast day recordings.
