= The Sky Parade =

1936 film by Otho Lovering

- Theatrical poster
- Directed by: Otho Lovering
- Written by: Arthur J. Beckhard; Robert M. Burtt; Brian Marlow; Wilfred G. Moore; Byron Morgan
- Produced by: Harold Hurley
- Starring: Jimmie Allen; William Gargan; Katherine DeMille; Kent Taylor; Grant Withers; Syd Saylor
- Cinematography: Alfred Gilks; William C. Mellor
- Edited by: Everett Douglas
- Music by: Gerard Carbonara; John Leipold
- Production company: Paramount Pictures
- Distributed by: Paramount Pictures
- Release date: April 17, 1936
- Running time: 70 minutes
- Country: United States
- Language: English

The Sky Parade is a 1936 American aviation drama film directed by Otho Lovering and written by Arthur J. Beckhard, Robert M. Burtt, Brian Marlow, Wilfred G. Moore and Byron Morgan. Starring Jimmie Allen, William Gargan, Katherine DeMille, Kent Taylor, Grant Withers and Syd Saylor, it was released on April 17, 1936, by Paramount Pictures.

The Sky Parade was based on the radio series The Air Adventures of Jimmie Allen created by Robert M. Burtt and Wilfred G. Moore (first broadcast in 1933). After years of Jimmie Allen radio drama episodes, "Jimmie makes his (screen) début in "The Sky Parade," The film was also notable as "the first film to use a number of incidents which would later become common within the sub-genre: the attempted hijack."

== Plot ==
World War I fighter pilot Scotty Allen (Robert Fiske) returns home to learn his wife died giving birth to their first son Jimmie. After the Armistice, Scotty refuses to see his son until his fellow airmen, "Speed Robertson" (William Gargan) and Tommy Wade (Kent Taylor), convince him it is his duty to raise Jimmie. Speed and Scotty join an old buddy Casey Cameron (Grant Withers) who has a flying circus. Tommy, however, joins his father's bank. For years, the flying circus makes record-breaking flights and in 1924, Casey adds parachutist Geraldine "Geri" Croft (Katherine DeMille) to the troupe. Casey then leaves the circus to smuggle goods for "Gat" Billings (Edgar Dearing).

Tommy's father offers to back Scotty and Speed in their work, while Geri agrees to put Jimmie through school. In 1927, Speed and Scotty attempt to cross the Atlantic in 36 hours but they crash on take-off, and Scotty is killed. Other transatlantic flights take place by Charles Lindbergh and Amelia Earhart.

Speed proposes to Geri, she refuses, believing he only wants to protect young Jimmie. By 1933, their airline, Continental, has become incorporated. Casey returns, following Billings' run-in with the authorities, and asks for a job, but Speed refuses. Continental, meanwhile, is perfecting an automatic pilot device, which Billings hopes to sell to Russian Baron Ankrevitch (Georges Renavent). Casey spies on the project. After a five-year absence, Geri returns with high school graduate Jimmie, who wants to learn to fly. Although Speed and Geri still carry a silent flame for each other, she dates Casey until Speed finally asks her to dinner.

Casey then offers to let Jimmie take his first flight to test the automatic pilot. Continental loses its mail contract to the Army . The airline plans to fly to Washington, D.C. and secure a patent for the auto-pilot. When the aircraft takes off from Las Vegas, Billings and Casey appear and hold Geri and Speed hostage. Jimmie hides in the aircraft, and after Casey and the pilot are shot, he lands the aircraft with directions radioed by Speed. Finally, Geri and Speed make plans to marry, and Continental gets its mail contract. Jimmie now is a genuine pilot working for Continental.

== Cast ==
- Jimmie Allen as himself (Note: A total of three actors played the role of Jimmie Allen including Benny Bartlett as Jimmie Allen - Age 9 (uncredited) and Billy Lee as Jimmie Allen - Age 4 (uncredited))
- William Gargan as "Speed" Robertson
- Katherine DeMille as Geraldine "Geri" Croft
- Kent Taylor as Tommy Wade
- Grant Withers as Casey Cameron
- Syd Saylor as "Flash" Lewis
- Robert Fiske as Scotty Allen
- Edgar Dearing as "Gat" Billings (uncredited)
- Georges Renavent as Baron Ankrovith (uncredited)

== Production ==
Production on The Sky Parade began in early December 1935. The film introduced a number of unique or unusual aviation technology, including the autopilot and air-to-ground communication. "It was the first film where an unqualified pilot is 'talked down' by radio from the airport control tower." The Sky Parade featured a number of aircraft, including a Stearman C3, Thomas-Morse S-4C, Travel Air 4000 and Waco 10.

== Reception ==
Benjamin R. Crisler in his review for The New York Times, gave an overall positive review, acknowledging that the audience for The Sky Parade was a youthful one, "...everybody plays the picture as it should be played; that is, as much like a Saturday afternoon episode of 'The Perils of Pauline' as possible."

Aviation film historian Stephen Pendo in From the Wright Brothers to Top Gun: Aviation, Nationalism, and Popular Cinema (1995), considered The Sky Parade, a continuation of the earlier radio dramas starring Jimmie Allen.

Aviation film historian Michael Paris in Celluloid Wings: The Impact of Movies on Aviation (1984), had a similar reaction, saying that The Sky Parade was "... An inconsequential production in many respects. 'Sky Parade' was pure aviation adventure in which hijackers take over an airliner and kill the pilot. Young Jimmie, travelling as a passenger, defeats the hijackers and manages to land the plane safely."
