= Captain Midnight =

American adventure media franchise

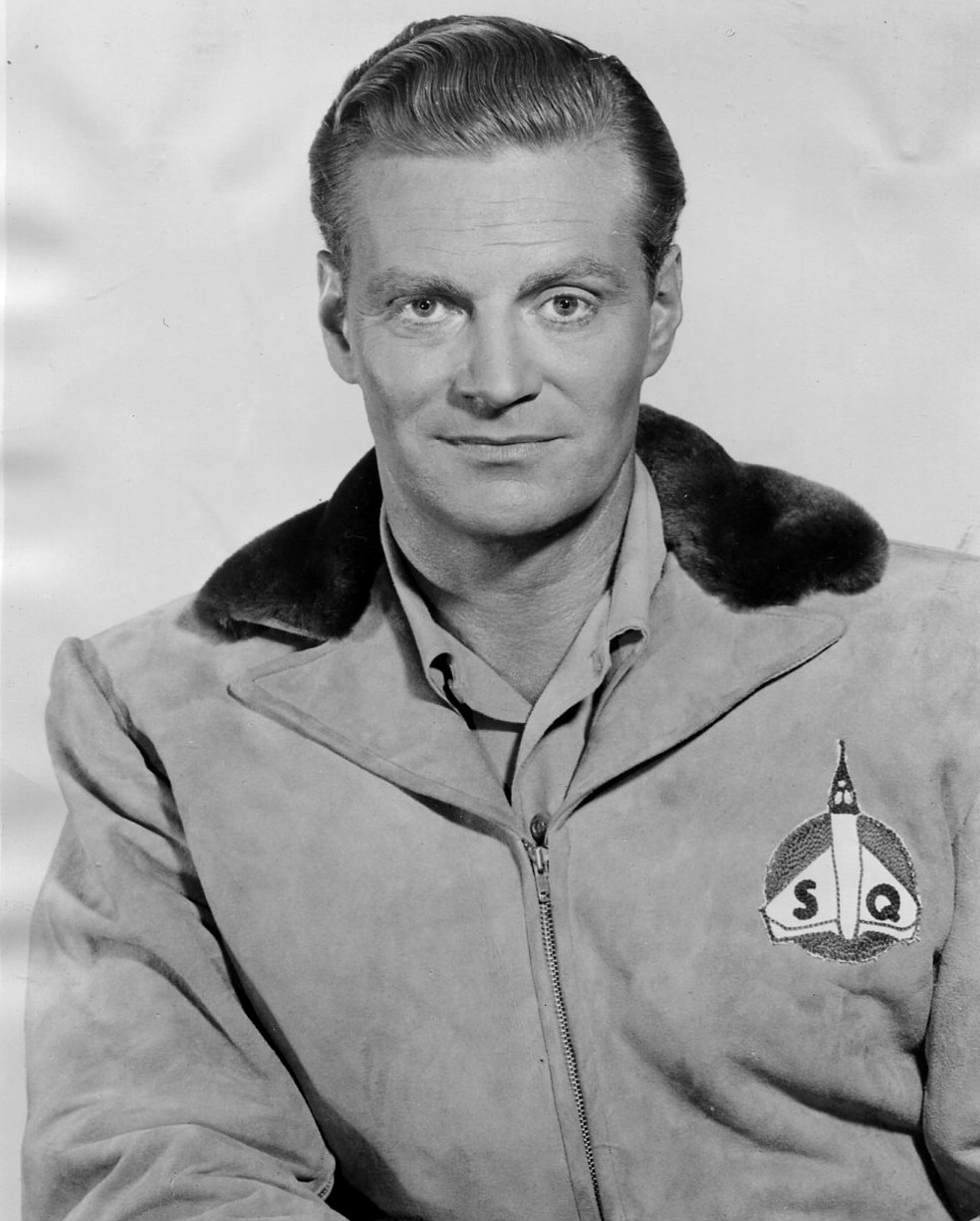
- Richard Webb as Captain Midnight, 1954.
- First appearance: 1938 (radio show)
- Last appearance: December 1949 (radio show)
- Created by: Wilfred G. Moore and Robert M. Burtt
- Portrayed by: Dave O'Brien (serial); Richard Webb (TV series)
- Alter-ego: Captain Jim "Red" Albright

Captain Midnight (later rebranded for television syndication as Jet Jackson, Flying Commando) is an American adventure franchise first broadcast as a radio serial from 1938 to 1949. The character's popularity throughout the 1940s and into the mid-1950s extended to serial films (1942), a television show (1954–1956), a syndicated newspaper strip (1942 – late 1940s), and a comic book title (1942–1948).

== Radio origins ==
Sponsored by the Skelly Oil Company, the Captain Midnight radio program was the creation of radio scripters Wilfred G. Moore and Robert M. Burtt, who had previously scored a success for Skelly with their boy pilot adventure serial The Air Adventures of Jimmie Allen.

Developed at the Blackett, Sample and Hummert advertising agency in Chicago, Captain Midnight began as a syndicated show on October 17, 1938, airing through the spring of 1940 on a few Midwest stations, including Chicago's WGN. In 1940, Ovaltine, a product of The Wander Company, took over sponsorship. With Pierre Andre as announcer, the series was then heard nationally on the Mutual Radio Network where it remained until 1942. It moved to the Merchandise Mart and the NBC Blue Network in September 1942. When the U.S. Government broke up the NBC Red and Blue Networks, Ovaltine moved the series back to Mutual, beginning September 1945, where it remained until December 1949.

The show was known for the imaginative use of exciting technological advancements to create narrative thrills, inspiring young audiences to dream of future advances.

== Premise ==
The title character, originally Captain Jim "Red" Albright, was a World War I U.S. Army pilot. His Captain Midnight code name was given by a general who sent him on a high-risk mission from which he returned at the stroke of 12. When the show began in 1938, Albright was a private aviator who helped people, but his situation changed in 1940. When the show was taken over by Ovaltine, the origin story explained how Albright was recruited to head the Secret Squadron, an aviation-oriented paramilitary organization fighting sabotage and espionage during the period prior to the United States' entry into World War II. The Secret Squadron acted both within and outside the United States.

When the United States was attacked at Pearl Harbor, which curiously was foreshadowed in the program, the show shifted the Secret Squadron's duties to fight the more unconventional aspects of the war. Besides the stock villain, Ivan Shark, the war years introduced Axis villains Baron von Karp, Admiral Himakito and von Schrecker. The Secret Squadron wartime activities were usually outside the continental United States, with adventures in Europe, South America, the Pacific, and continental Asia. War-related subject matter included the theft of an experimental flying wing aircraft, radar coupled antiaircraft guns, jet aircraft and other weapons.

After the war, some of the newer villains used war surplus equipment to carry out their activities. Secret Squadron activities shifted to contending with criminals as well as spies. The action continued to operate internationally, with adventures in South America and Africa as well as within the United States.

The show was extremely popular, with an audience in the millions. Just under half the listeners were adult, and it was a favorite of World War II United States Army Air Force crews when they were stationed in the United States. Radio premiums offered by the series (usually marked with Midnight's personal symbol of a winged clock with the hands pointing to midnight) included decoders. These Code-O-Graphs were used by listeners to decipher encrypted messages previewing the next day's episode, usually broadcast once a week. Other premiums included rings, telescopes, and World War II items. (The broadcast messages were encrypted with relatively trivial monoalphabetic substitution ciphers with word division.)

The scripts depicted women who were treated as equals, not just characters waiting to be rescued. Both Joyce Ryan of the Secret Squadron and Fury Shark, daughter of villain Ivan Shark, pulled their own weight in the adventures. Joyce went on commando raids and became involved in aerial dogfights during World War II.

== Characters ==
- Captain Midnight – World War I aviator who leads the Secret Squadron, though he spends much time in the field actively contending with crime, espionage, and sabotage. He is an extremely skilled aviator with an ability to fly almost any aircraft superlatively. The Captain is usually accompanied by a team consisting of three Secret Squadron members (played by Ed Prentiss, Bill Bouchey and Paul Barnes, with Ed Prentiss also playing his part as Captain Midnight the longest).
- Chuck Ramsay – Captain Midnight's ward, a young man in his late teens or early twenties who is a Secret Squadron agent. Prior to the formation of the Secret Squadron, he shared adventures with his guardian. A member of Captain Midnight's usual team, he was played by Jules Getlin, Dolph Nelson, Billy Rose, Jack Bivans and Johnny Coons.
- Ichabod "Ikky" Mudd – The Secret Squadron's Chief Mechanic. Mudd knew Captain Midnight briefly before the Secret Squadron's formation, and joined the Squadron shortly after it was formed. A member of Captain Midnight's usual team played by Hugh Studebaker, Sherman Marks, Art Hern, and Sid Melton on television, he was responsible for the development of the Code-O-Graph and also developed some weapons before and during World War II.
- Joyce Ryan – A young woman in her late teens or early twenties who is a Secret Squadron agent. She was originally discovered as an amnesiac by Captain Midnight and Chuck Ramsay during a 1941 skirmish with the forces of Ivan Shark. She became a Secret Squadron member after several adventures with Captain Midnight, Chuck Ramsay, and Ichabod Mudd, replacing an earlier female companion named Patsy Donovan. Prior to World War II, she regained her memory and elected to remain in the Secret Squadron. A member of Captain Midnight's usual team, she was played by Marilou Neumayer and Angeline Orr.
- Agent Kelly, SS-11 – Lyle William Kelly, a Secret Squadron agent who frequently accompanied Captain Midnight's usual team on their adventures. Kelly was Captain Midnight's usual liaison to his superior, Major Barry Steele. Kelly was played by Olan Soule.
- Major Barry Steele – U.S. Army Intelligence officer recalled from inactive duty as Captain Midnight's superior officer. Steele usually worked in the background but often provided the Secret Squadron with data and equipment. He often provided assignments for the Secret Squadron but left its administration to Captain Midnight.
- "Mr. Jones" – Pseudonym used by the mysterious highly placed government official who created the Secret Squadron and made Captain Midnight its commander, implicitly the President of the United States.
- Ivan Shark – Ruthless criminal mastermind who developed a highly efficient mercenary organization. Shark often sold services of his organization to agents of foreign governments. Played by Boris Aplon, he was the default villain on the radio program. Although he was captured or thought killed many times, he always returned to plague the hero until, in the final episode, he was eaten by a polar bear while Captain Midnight watched from a plane overhead.
- Fury Shark – Ivan Shark's devoted daughter and sadistic second in command in his organization. She frequently took command when Ivan Shark was unable to function (e.g., in prison). Highly intelligent, she always proved herself capable. She was played by Rene Rodier and Sharon Grainger.
- Gardo – One of Ivan Shark's principal aides. Gardo was portrayed as being loyal but relatively slow witted, and frequently the butt of Shark's wrath. Occasionally acted as Ivan Shark's pilot.
- Fang – One of Ivan Shark's pre-war aides, Fang was an Asian, who always addressed Shark as "Master." His presence vanished after World War II.
- The Barracuda – Head of an extensive criminal organization similar to Ivan Shark's, but headquartered in the Orient. The Barracuda headed the Tiger Tong, a Chinese gang, and had his own private air force. Killed in 1942.
- Baron von Karp – Nazi World War II villain with whom the Secret Squadron contended, first in the United States, then in occupied Europe.
- Admiral Himakito – Japanese officer with whom the Secret Squadron contended in the Pacific theater during World War II.

== In other media ==
=== Film ===
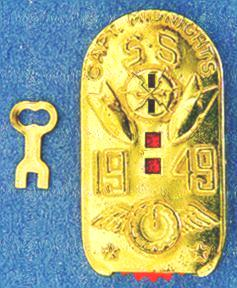
1949 Key-O-Matic Code-O-Graph

Popular actor-stunt man Dave O'Brien had the title role in the Columbia Pictures 15-episode serial Captain Midnight (1942). The serial used some of the characters from the radio show, but differed significantly from the radio program. Missing were the Secret Squadron and the Squadron equipment. The Captain Midnight character was presented as a masked secret identity for Captain Albright. The serial was later aired (one chapter per week) on select TV stations in the fall of 1953 and early 1954, under the title Captain Midnight's Adventure Theatre. (The TV show began a bit later, on September 4, 1954, on a weekly basis on CBS.

=== Television ===
The Captain Midnight TV series, produced by Screen Gems and starring Richard Webb, began September 9, 1954, on CBS, continuing for 39 episodes until January 21, 1956. Each episode was thirty minutes. (The first season ran 26 episodes from September 9, 1954, through February 26, 1955; the second season ran 13 episodes from October 29, 1955, through January 21, 1956). The sponsors were Ovaltine and Kix Cereal/General Mills.

In the television program, Captain Midnight (now a veteran of the Korean War) heads the Secret Squadron as a private organization, in contrast to the radio show. As with the Fawcett comic, the only other character of the radio show held over was Ichabod (Ikky) Mudd (played by Sid Melton), who was used for comic relief. Another regular character was Dr. Aristotle "Tut" Jones, Midnight's resident scientist, played by character actor Olan Soule. (Soule was the only actor to perform in both the radio program and the television program. In the radio program, he played Agent Kelly, SS-11.)

The aircraft featured in the series is the Douglas D-558-2 Skyrocket, named the Silver Dart, and was based on using both models and occasionally stock footage. The series filmed at the Ray Corrigan Ranch in Simi Valley, California. Unlike other TV action heroes, Captain Midnight never ventured into space, but rather was confined to Earth's atmosphere. Viewers could send away for a special decoder device and membership kit by including the inner wax seal from a jar of Ovaltine to "Capt. Midnight, Box P, Chicago 77, Illinois".

The show was produced by George Bilson, with theme music by Don Ferris. Special effects were handled by the Dallons brothers. Some episodes included movie actors such as Frank Lacteen, Sally Fraser, Michael Hinn, Harry Lauter, I. Stanford Jolley, Mel Welles, Byron Foulger, Mike Ragan, Shelley Fabares, Buddy Baer and others.

When the TV series went into syndication in 1958 via Telescreen Advertising, Ovaltine was no longer the sponsor. However, The Wander Company owned the rights to the character's name "Captain Midnight," forcing a title change by Screen Gems from Captain Midnight to Jet Jackson, Flying Commando, and all references in the episodes to Captain Midnight were redubbed "Jet Jackson." The series (as "Jet Jackson") was syndicated well into the early 1960s. The Jet Jackson name was also used for the show's syndication in Australia in order to avoid confusion with a fictional bushranger also named Captain Midnight.

=== Comic strip ===
Captain Midnight
- Author: France Herron (1942–1944)
- Illustrator: "Jonwan" (Erwin L. Hess)
- Current status/schedule: Daily and Sunday; concluded
- Launch date: June 29, 1942
- End date: late 1940s
- Syndicate(s): Chicago Sun Syndicate
- Genre: adventure

A newspaper comic strip, based closely on the radio program, debuted in 1942. The strip, bylined by "Jonwan" (Erwin L. Hess) was drawn in a style similar to that of Milton Caniff. The major characters of the radio show were retained, including Joyce Ryan, Chuck Ramsay, Ichabod Mudd and Major Barry Steele. The strip was released by the Chicago Sun Syndicate on June 29, 1942, and ran until the late 1940s. France Herron wrote the strip from 1942 to 1944.

The strip had some differences from the radio show and did not reprise the radio adventures. In the strip, Captain Midnight was referred to as "an unofficial fighter for freedom," which is at variance from the radio show, where the Secret Squadron was set up by a high governmental official ("Mr. Jones"), which the hero was recruited to head (unless, of course, "unofficial" meant, in the modern pop-culture sense, "subject to official disavowal if caught or killed on a politically sensitive mission"). Even with the variations, it was far closer to the radio show than any of the other spinoffs.

=== Comic book ===
Captain Midnight
- Promotional art for Captain Midnight #0 (2012 Free Comic Book Day). Art by Raymond Swanland.

Publication information
- Publisher: Dell Comics; Fawcett Comics; Moonstone Books; Dark Horse Comics
- First appearance: July, 1941
- Created by: Dan Gormley

In-story information
- Alter ego: Captain Jim "Red" Albright
- Team affiliations: Secret Squadron
- Abilities: genius-level intelligence, gizmos which release clouds of blinding darkness, infra-red Doom-Beam Torch, Gliderchute
Captain Midnight
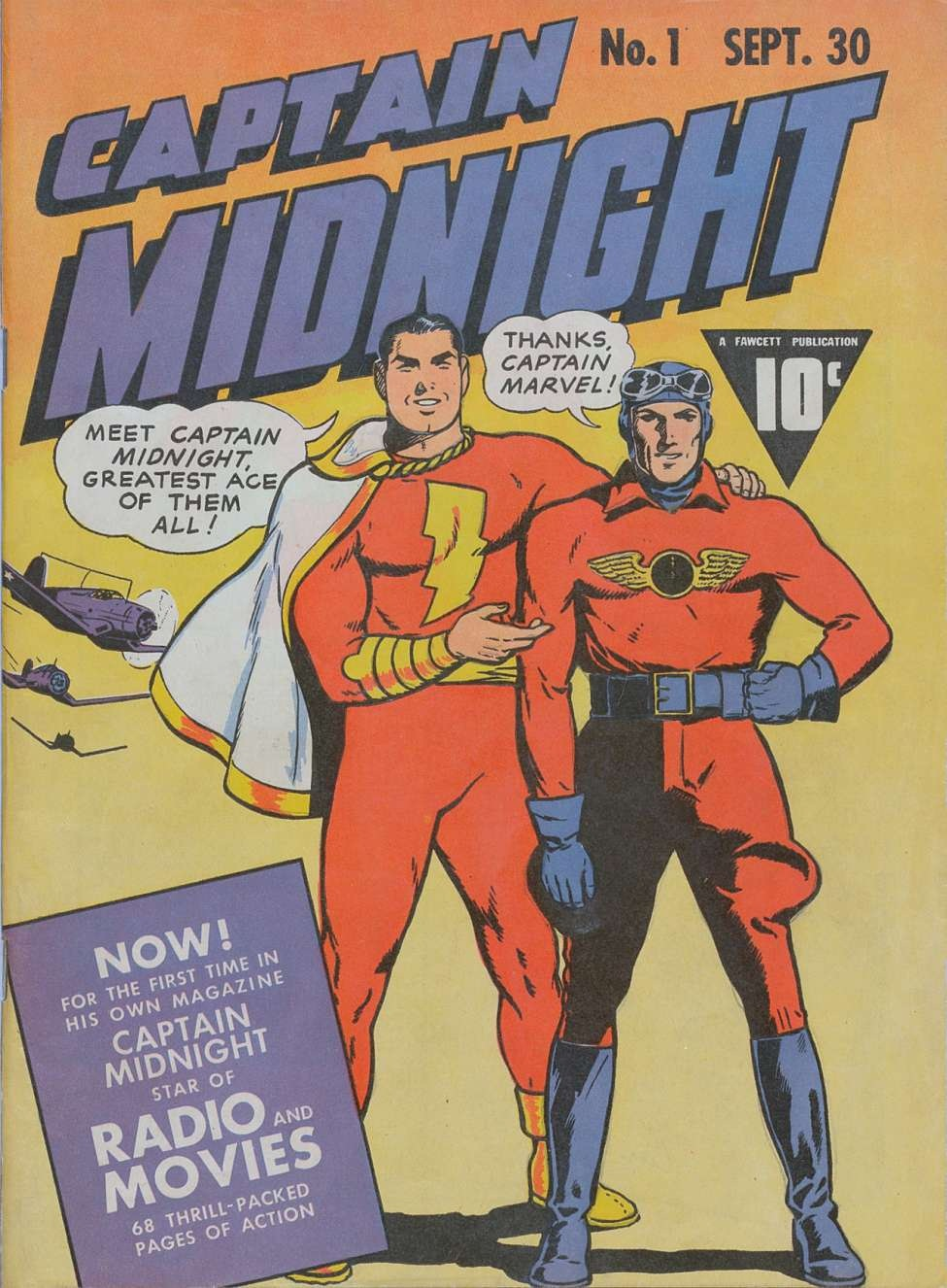
- Cover for Captain Midnight comic book #1 (September, 1942). Art by Jack Binder.
Publication information
- Publisher: Fawcett Comics
- Format: Standard Golden Age
- Genre: Adventure
- Publication date: Sept. 1942 – Sept. 1948
- No. of issues: 67
- Main characters: Captain Midnight; Joyce Ryan; Chuck Ramsay; Sgt. Twilight (Ichabod Mudd); Major Barry Steele
Creative team
- Written by: Otto Binder

Dell Comics published Captain Midnight adventures in The Funnies #57 (Captain Midnight's first appearance in comics), #59, 61–63 (Sept. 1941, Nov. 1941–Mar. 1942) and Popular Comics #76–78 (June–August 1942).

Fawcett published 67 issues of Captain Midnight Comics from Sept. 1942 to Sept 1948. Otto Binder was one of the writers on the comic book. The Fawcett character bore little resemblance to the radio character, and only the character Ichabod Mudd appeared regularly in the comic as the sidekick Sgt. Twilight.

Captain Midnight in the comic wore a skintight scarlet suit and used an array of gizmos like Doctor Mid-Nite which released clouds of blinding darkness, the infra-red "Doom-Beam Torch" which he used to burn his emblem into walls and unlucky villains, and a "Gliderchute" (similar to the flying Wingsuit) attached to the sides of his costume.

In his Captain Albright secret identity he was a genius-level inventor like Edison. He had a secret laboratory in the desert.

The Fawcett Captain Midnight series was reprinted in England by L. Miller & Son in 40 issues in 1950–1953.

In 1960, the Brazilian publisher Outubro published the comic book Jet Jackson. The first edition had a cover by Jayme Cortez, a script by Hélio Porto, and drawings by Getulio Delphim. The comic book lasted 23 issues, and the stories were republished by Taika, the publisher that succeeded Outubro until 1973.

In 2010, Moonstone Books' revival of the Hillman Periodicals 1940s title Air Fighters Comics published its issue #1, which included a new Captain Midnight story.

In 2012, Dark Horse Comics reintroduced the character, with a three-part story written by Joshua Williamson with art by Victor Ibañez and Pere Pérez. In June 2013, Captain Midnight #1 was released by the same publisher as an ongoing series.

=== Books ===
In 1942 Whitman Publishing released Joyce of the Secret Squadron as part of the Authorized Editions series.

In 1977, Marvel Comics published Captain Midnight Action Book for Sports Health & Nutrition, written by Scott Eldeman and illustrated by Don Perlin.

In 2000, McFarland released Radio's Captain Midnight: The Wartime Biography. The contents were derived from the Ovaltine-sponsored radio programs, covering the adventures through the close of World War II.

In 2010, Moonstone Books published a collection of new Captain Midnight short stories entitled Captain Midnight Chronicles. The book's stories reflect an amalgamated version of the Captain Midnight character and his supporting cast, and incorporate elements from the various media incarnations of the character, including the radio and television series, the Columbia movie serial and Fawcett comic book.

== Cultural references to Captain Midnight ==
- In the television series The Dick Van Dyke Show, S05 E27 "The Man From My Uncle", Laura says to Rob "Not every adult still holds on to their Captain Midnight decoder ring" when speaking about his boy-like excitement for the FBI using their home as a stakeout base of operations.
- The 1977 short story "Jeffty Is Five" by Harlan Ellison prominently features the main characters bonding over Captain Midnight broadcasts and owning Secret Decoder Badges.
- In Stephen King's 1986 horror novel It, during the Losers Club's first underground battle with It in 1958, Maturin the turtle references protagonist Bill Denbrough believing in the existence of Captain Midnight while aiding him in the first Ritual of Chud.
- In the television series Miami Vice S03 E13 "Down for the Count, Part 2", Tubbs tells Crockett "And I don't even have my Captain Midnight decoder ring" when they discuss a letter with encrypted information.
- A hacker using the pseudonym of "Captain Midnight" hacked the HBO signal in 1986.
- In the 2018 film The House with a Clock in its Walls, both the young hero and the villain are fans of Captain Midnight. The boy wears Captain Midnight goggles, and the Captain Midnight decoder plays a role in the plot.
- In the BBC One television series, Keeping Up Appearances series 1 third episode "Stately Home" the father of Hyacinth Bucket dresses up as Captain Midnight to save a woman at the Post Office from a "fate worse than death" at the hands of aliens. Later on, Hyacinth felt that her father's lewd behavior toward that woman was disgraceful for Captain Midnight.
- In Season 5, Episode 10 of The Beverly Hillbillies, Max Baer, Jr. as Jethro is piloting the O.K Oil Company corporate jet while wearing an aviator’s helmet with goggles and a leather jacket. When asked by the co-pilot where he got his wings, he replies, “Captain Midnight”.
- The Statler Brothers' nostalgia song "Do You Remember These" mentions Captain Midnight and Ovaltine in the lyrics.
- In the Stranger Things prequel play The First Shadow, young Henry Creel enjoys the radio show.
