= Hop Harrigan (radio program) =

American radio program for children

- Genre: Juvenile adventure serial
- Running time: 15 minutes
- Country of origin: United States
- Language: English
- Syndicates: ABC; Mutual
- Starring: Chester Stratton; Albert Aley; Mitzi Gould; Ken Lynch; Jackson Beck
- Announcer: Glenn Riggs; Dresser Dahlstead; Vic Perrin
- Written by: Albert Aley; Bob Burtt; Wilfred Moore
- Directed by: Jay Clark; Jack Johnstone; Allen Ducovny; Jessica Maxwell
- Produced by: Harry Ingram
- Original release: August 31, 1942 – February 6, 1948
- Sponsored by: General Foods

Hop Harrigan is an American old-time radio juvenile adventure program. It was broadcast on ABC from August 31, 1942, until August 2, 1946, and on Mutual from October 2, 1946, until February 6, 1948. General Foods began sponsoring the program on October 2, 1944; it had previously been unsponsored.

== Format ==
The Hop Harrigan character originated in All American Comics, and the radio program was adapted from that publication. Harrigan was a young aviator, and most of the show's plots dealt with his battles with the Axis powers during World War II. At age 18, Harrigan was not much older than the show's target audience of young listeners. In his book, Radio Crime Fighters: Over 300 Programs from the Golden Age, Jim Cox wrote that Harrigan's "detecting and crime fighting enthralled the adolescents for whom it was intended, creating a loyal following that clung to every new action-packed crisis."

The program was produced in cooperation with the Air Training Corps of America and was endorsed by the Office of the Adjutant General of the Army.

== Personnel ==
Chester Stratton initially had the title role in the program. Albert Aley played Harrigan later. Mitzi Gould played Harrigan's girlfriend. The only other character appearing regularly was Tank Tinker, Harrigan's mechanic, who was played first by Ken Lynch and later by Jackson Beck. Announcers were Glenn Riggs, Dresser Dahlstead, and Vic Perrin. Directors included Jay Clark, Jack Johnstone, Allen Ducovny, and Jessica Maxwell. Writers included Aley, Bob Burtt, and Wilfred Moore. Producers included Harry Ingram.

== Popularity ==
In the program's second month on the air, the staff of Hop Harrigan received 124,264 letters as people wrote in for premiums that were offered to listeners. The program had two organizations for young fans—the All American Flying Club and the American Observation Corps.
