= Helpmate (radio program) =

American old-time radio soap opera

- Genre: Soap opera
- Running time: 15 minutes
- Country of origin: United States
- Language: English
- Syndicates: NBC
- Starring: Arlene Francis; Fern Persons; Myron McCormick; John Larkin; Robert Sloan
- Written by: Margaret Lewerth
- Produced by: Frank and Anne Hummert
- Original release: September 22, 1941 – June 30, 1944

Helpmate is an American old-time radio soap opera. It was broadcast on NBC from September 22, 1941, until June 30, 1944.

== Format ==
In his book, Frank and Anne Hummert's Radio Factory: The Programs and Personalities of Broadcasting's Most Prolific Producers, radio historian Jim Cox wrote that Helpmate focused on the lives of three couples who were neighbors: Linda and Steve Harper, Grace and Clyde Marshall, and Holly and George Emerson. A Chicago Tribune news item previewing the program described the show as "the story of an unselfish woman who sacrifices much to advance the musical career of the man in whom she believes".

== Personnel ==
Characters in Helpmate and the actors who portrayed them are shown in the table below.

Character	Actor
Linda Harper	Arlene Francis; Fern Persons
Steve Harper	Myron McCormick; John Larkin; Robert Sloan
Grace Marshall	Judith Evelyn; Ruth Perrott
Clyde Marshall	Karl Weber
Holly Emerson	Beryl Vaughn
George Emerson	Sidney Ellstrom
Irene Emerson	Jessie Royce Landis
Holly	Marilyn Erskine
Ed Somers	Richard Widmark
Mary Halliday	Marilou Neumayer

Frank and Anne Hummert were the producers; Margaret Lewerth was the writer.
