= Robert M. Burtt =

American aviator and writer

Robert M. Burtt (born 1894 or 1895) was an American aviator and writer.

== Early years ==
Burtt was born in West Newton, Massachusetts. His parents were missionaries, and he was in the interior of China with them from age 10 to age 16. Those years influenced his future because of the time that he spent reading books that the family took with them. He read all of the books, including the complete works of Dumas and Victor Hugo, some two or three times. When he returned to the United States, he was deficient in some areas of education, but he had a solid background in adventure stories. He graduated from prep school in 1917 and enrolled in the Massachusetts Institute of Technology as a cadet in aviation.

After Burtt returned from military service in World War I, he attended Columbia University. There he ran track, played quarterback and halfback on the varsity football team, and he was president of an aeronautical society. Philosopher Edwin Arthur Burtt was his uncle.

== Aviation ==
=== Military ===
Burtt's initial training in aviation began in September 1917 in Boston. That November he went to France as a flying cadet in the American Air Service. His basic flight training occurred at Châteauroux French Military Flying School, and he had advanced training at the Third Aviation Instruction Center in Issodun, France. During World War I he was a first lieutenant in the 28th pursuit squadron of the 3rd Pursuit Group. During one air encounter, Burtt's plane was attacked by eight enemy aircraft. With the propeller broken and hot oil coming into the cockpit, he crashed after a 10,000-foot dive into a crater created by a shell in a no-man's-land area. That night he crawled to safety behind American lines as shells flew overhead.

=== Commercial ===
After Burtt finished his studies at Columbia, he became a commercial aviator, barnstorming around the United States.In addition to flying he worked at other jobs, including washing dishes and being an oil-field roustabout.

On July 25, 1928, Burtt was named head of the newly created Bureau of Aviation in Kansas City, Missouri. He had worked for the Vacuum Oil Company in Kansas City prior to the appointment. The bureau was part of an effort by the city's Chamber of Commerce to have Kansas City established as an aviation center. That effort was backed by an allocation of $2.5 million. A major focus of Burtt's work in the new position was convincing aviation-related companies, including those that manufactured airplanes and parts for airplanes, to locate in Kansas City.

On March 6, 1929, Burtt resigned his position with the Chamber of Commerce to become director of sales in the Kansas City area for the Curtiss Flying Service, Inc. He compared the sales operation at Fairfax Field to a car dealership, with several kinds of Curtiss planes on display at the field. His sales territory included Kansas, Missouri, Nebraska, Iowa, Arkansas, Oklahoma, and southern Illinois. After Curtiss changed its sales operations, with responsibility for sales shifting to distributors, Burtt resigned from that position on November 15, 1929.

In April 1930 Burtt began overseeing advertising, publicity, and sales for the Goebel Flying School at the airport in Kansas City. In December 1930 he became chief pilot for Midland Air Express, a new air service that provided flights between Kansas City and Cheyenne, Wyoming.

== Writing ==
=== Early writing ===
In the mid-1920s Burtt wrote a column, "This Week in Aviation", for the Kansas City Journal-Post. While he worked for Curtiss-Wright his desire to be a writer increased, even after an executive of the company warned him that he would probably starve if he had to support himself by writing. The 1929 business collapse led to the company's firing him as Burtt received the message, "Now you're a writer; you're fired."

His first year as a freelance writer produced $3 income, and he had spent more to mail manuscripts than he had spent on food. At that point he realized that he was not ready to write for major magazines and that he should not write about topics that were unfamiliar to him. He began analyzing contents of pulp magazines, and he decided to write stories with a focus on flying. He created the character "Battling Grogan" and sold stories about Grogan's adventures leading a squad of flying pirates in China. That success prompted him to go to Hollywood and begin writing scripts for films, but he failed in that regard. After he sold articles to about two dozen pulp magazines, a conversation at a cocktail party prompted him to look into another medium. A woman commented that radio soap operas had no appeal for her sons, who were interesting in flying.

=== Radio ===
Burtt wrote for radio programs for 18 years. In 1933 he and Willfred G. Moore collaborated to create The Air Adventures of Jimmie Allen, described in a contemporary newspaper article as "a radio serial that has a nice punch and should attract national attention". The program debuted on February 27, 1933, on radio station WDAF in Kansas City. The program was adapted into the film The Sky Parade (1936). Other programs for which he wrote included Sky King, Ann of the Airlanes, Captain Midnight, and Hop Harrigan,

=== Book ===
Burtt's book Curly, published by Exposition Press in 1962, told "the story of a young greyhound and the effect he has on the life of a teenaged boy." The title was the name of a dog destined to be euthanized because of a superstition that if a greyhound's tail curls to the right it will never find success as a racer. The story focused on the dog and the boy's efforts to protect him. Burtt supplemented the fictional narrative with facts about greyhounds and how they were trained to race. A review in the Mansfield News Journal said that the factual material was presented "always in entertaining form" and added, "Boys and girls who love dogs will most certainly love the story of David and Curly."

=== Workshops ===
In 1960 Burtt began working with writer Philip Ketchum to conduct workshops in Saluda, North Carolina, to encourage inexperienced writers and help them improve their work. The Blue Ridge Writer's Colony attracted writers from multiple states for activities that included studying fundamentals of writing and private consultations between attendees and members of the staff. The one-on-one sessions helped writers to overcome difficulties and improve their work. Critiques from Burtt and other experts helped them to see what they had done wrong.

== Other activities ==
=== Greyhound racing ===
Losing at greyhound races led Burtt to get into the business for himself, saying, "I'll get My own kennel and then maybe I can win." Having many friends in the greyhound-owners community facilitated his doing so. Initially he continued to write for radio while he worked with the dogs, but later he stopped writing to concentrate on raising Greyhounds. At one point his kennel's population reached 140, including up to three strings of racing dogs. He became part-owner of a magazine about greyhounds, The Greyhound Racing Record, and was its editor for about a decade. Then he sold his interest in the magazine and began working on a novel about greyhounds.

=== Civil Air Patrol ===
Concerns about a possible nuclear attack on the United States led Burtt to become active with the Civil Air Patrol (CAP) in the Miami area in 1961. He worked to prepare senior CAP members for search-and-rescue operations and CAP cadets for first aid, use of ham radios to communicate, and survival techniques if an attack should occur. Burtt emphasized the seriousness of the cause as he said that it was the first time he had allowed anything to disrupt his writing since he began working on radio serials in 1930.

=== Little theater ===
Burtt was a key figure in the formation of a little theater group known as the Blackfriars in Kansas City.

== Personal life ==
Burtt married Helen Thayer, a hostess for Trans World Airlines, on December 20, 1936, in Morris, Illinois. They had two daughters.
