= Marilou Neumayer =

American actress 1920 - 2013

Marilou Neumayer (born Mary Louise Neumayer; August 26, 1920 - April 20, 2013) was an American actress who worked primarily in old-time radio.

== Early years ==
Mary Louise Neumayer was born on August 26, 1920, in Council Bluffs, Iowa. Her parents were Lucas Frederick Neumayer and Katherine Cannon Neumayer. She graduated from Abraham Lincoln High School in Council Bluffs. Her activities there included participating in dramatic productions and the Girls Rifle Corps. In 1938 she was elected president of the freshman class at Duchesne College in Omaha, Nebraska. She joined the Duchesne College Players and appeared in The Rivals in the spring of 1939. In the spring of 1940 she performed in the Omaha Community Playhouse's production of The Petrified Forest.

== Career ==
Neumayer began working on radio on WOW in Omaha in 1940. She later had the female lead on Captain Midnight. Other programs on which she appeared included Freedom of Opportunity, Grand Hotel, Blind Date, Spotlight Bands, Sweet River, Chicago Theater of the Air, and Shoot the Works.

Partial List of Marilou Neumayer's Radio Roles
| Program | Role |
|---|---|
| Aggie Horn | Gwen Williams |
| Bachelor's Children | Dotty Stamm |
| Captain Midnight | Joyce Ryan |
| Helpmate | Mary Halliday |
| Ma Perkins | Stella Carlton |

Neumayer had a leading role in R. N. — Serving All Mankind, a 1943 film that was made to boost recruitment of nurses. She was featured in advertising for Fannie May candy.

== Personal life and death ==
Neumayer and other actors participated in psycho-dramatic therapy at Washington Veteran's Rehabilitation Hospital in Chicago. At least once a week they dramatized scenes from a selected psychotic soldier's life for him. Psychiatrists felt that the dramatizations helped each patient recall forgotten incidents as a means of increasing the chances that he would be cured.

Neumayer had a solo pilot's license, and she was rated an expert marksman by the National Rifle Association.

Neumayer married Harrison Christopher Putman Jr. on October 5, 1946, in Chicago. She died on April 20, 2013, in Peoria, Illinois.
