= Jessie Royce Landis =

American actress (1896-1972)

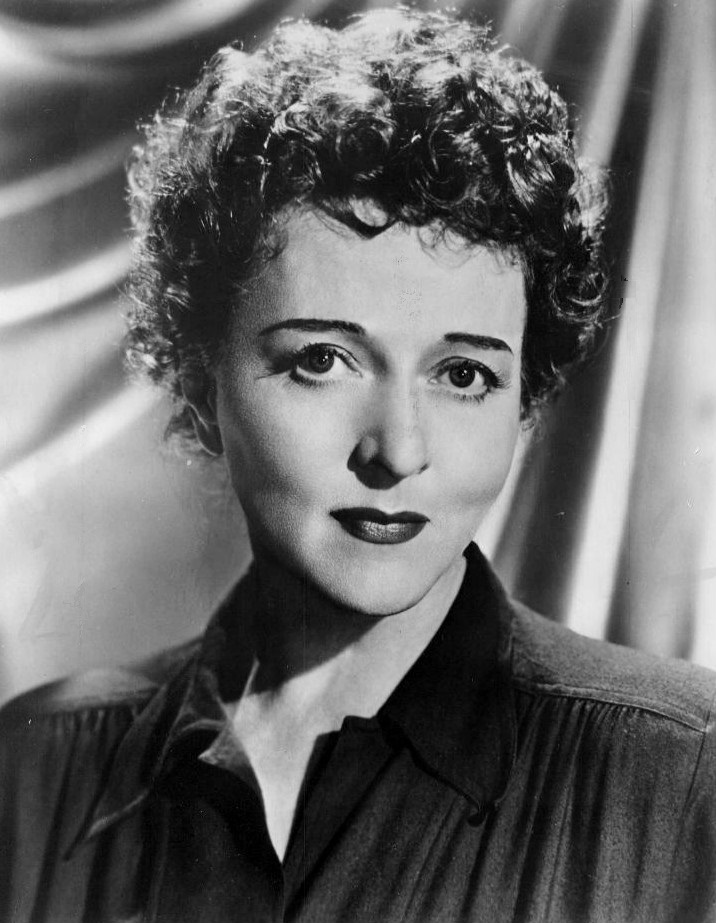
- Landis in 1954
- Born: Jessie Medbury; November 25, 1896; Chicago, Illinois, U.S.
- Died: February 2, 1972 (aged 75); Danbury, Connecticut, U.S.
- Resting place: Branchville Cemetery, Ridgefield, Connecticut
- Other name: Jesse Royce-Landis
- Years active: 1924–1972
- Spouses: Lester Perry Landis (m. 1915; div. 1925) Rex Smith (m. 1937; div. 1944) John F. R. Seitz (m. 1956)
- Children: 1

Jessie Royce Landis (born Jessie Medbury; November 25, 1896 – February 2, 1972), also known as Jesse Royce-Landis, was an American actress known for her mother roles in the Hitchcock films To Catch a Thief (1955) and North by Northwest (1959).

== Early life ==
Jessie Royce Landis was born Jessie Medbury in Chicago, Illinois to Paul, an orchestra musician, and Ella Medbury. Her acting surname Landis derives from her first husband, and she was married twice more.

A scholarship that Landis received when she was 14 enabled her to attend the Hinshaw Dramatic School, which led to her acting two years later with the Evanston Stock Company.

== Career ==
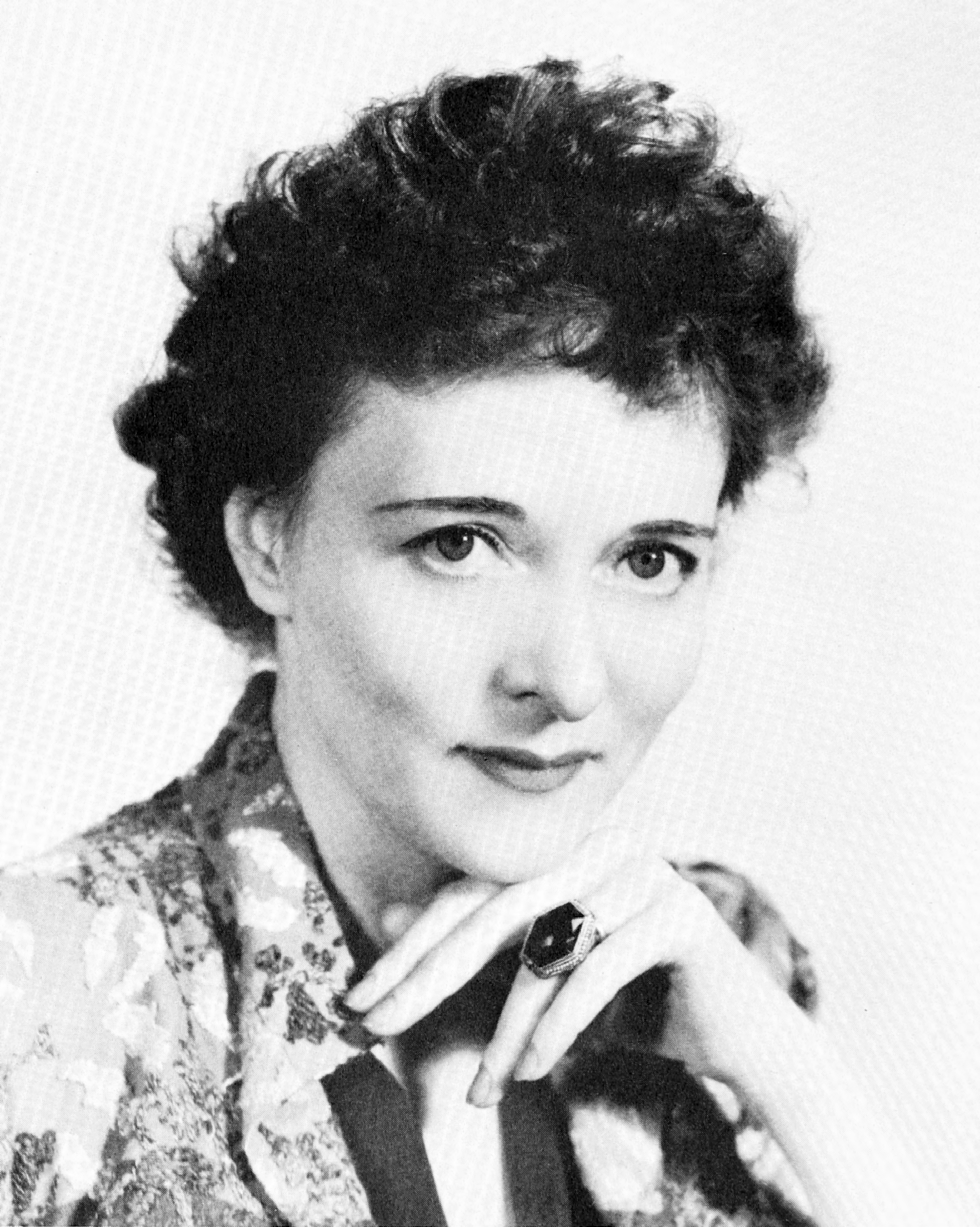
Landis starring in The Millionairess at the Westport Country Playhouse (1938), the US premiere of George Bernard Shaw's play

Landis was a stage actress for much of her career.

When her first husband's family encountered financial problems, she joined the North Shore Players as leading lady and director. In 1924, she left these dual roles to tour with The Highwayman.

Her Broadway career began with The Honor of the Family (1926) and ended with Roar Like a Dove (1964). In her early years on Broadway, she continued to act in touring productions. In the early 1950s, Landis spent three seasons acting on stage in London. Landis was recognized for the "best performance of the year" for her acting in Larger Than Life in London in 1950.

In the era of old-time radio, Landis had the roles of Irene Emerson on Helpmate and the housekeeper on The House on Q Street. She also was part of "a stellar cast of Broadway actors and actresses" in the cast of We Are Always Young on WOR in New York in 1941.

In the 1950s, she began appearing in movies as a character actress, such as her roles in To Catch a Thief (1955), and North by Northwest (1959), both starring Cary Grant and directed by Alfred Hitchcock. In North by Northwest she played Grant's character's mother, and in To Catch a Thief and The Swan (1956), she played the mother of the character played by Grace Kelly. Landis's appearance in North by Northwest earned her publicity for portraying Cary Grant's mother despite claiming to be nearly a year younger. Landis listed 1904 as the year of her birth. However, she had actually shaved eight years off her age; she was listed in the 1900 U.S. Census as a 3-year-old born in November 1896.

Landis made many television appearances in programs such as The United States Steel Hour, Alfred Hitchcock Presents, and Boris Karloff's Thriller.

Landis' autobiography You Won't Be So Pretty (but You'll Know More) was published in 1954.

== Marriages ==
Landis in 1930

Landis was married three times. In June 1915, she secretly married Perry Lester Landis, "a scion of one of Evanston's prominent families". Their son, Medbury Perry Landis, was born with Down syndrome in 1916. When she returned to the stage, he was put in a special school over his father's objections. The couple never lived together again; they divorced in 1925, and their son died in 1928.

Landis was married to Rex Smith from 1937 to 1944. In 1956, she married her third husband, United States Army Major General John F. R. "Jeff" Seitz (died 1978).

== Death ==
Landis passed away of cancer at Danbury Hospital in Danbury, Connecticut at the age of 75.

== Complete filmography ==
Year	Title	Role	Notes
1930	At Your Service		short
1930	Derelict	Helen Lorber	
1949	Mr. Belvedere Goes to College	Mrs. Chase	
1949	It Happens Every Spring	Mrs. Greenleaf	
1949	My Foolish Heart	Martha Winters	
1950	Mother Didn't Tell Me	Mrs. Wright	
1952	Meet Me Tonight	Olive Lloyd Ransome, segment "Ways and Means"	
1953	Main Street to Broadway	Jessie Royce Landis - First Nighter	uncredited
1955	To Catch a Thief	Jessie Stevens	
1956	The Swan	Princess Beatrix	
1956	The Girl He Left Behind	Mrs. Madeline Shaeffer	
1957	My Man Godfrey	Angelica Bullock	
1958	I Married a Woman	Mrs. Blake, Janice's Mother	
1959	North by Northwest	Clara Thornhill	
1959	A Private's Affair	Elizabeth T. Chapman	
1961	Goodbye Again	Mrs. Van der Besh	
1962	Bon Voyage!	Countessa "La Comtesse" DuFresne	
1962	Boys' Night Out	Ethel Williams	
1963	Critic's Choice	Charlotte Orr aka Charlie	
1963	Gidget Goes to Rome	Albertina Blythe	
1970	Airport	Mrs. Harriet DuBarry Mossman	

== Partial television credits ==
Year	Series/TV Movie	Role	Episode
1952	Larger Than Life	Julia Lambert	TV movie
1956	Climax!	Olivia Chesney	"An Episode of Sparrows"
1960	Alfred Hitchcock Presents	Claire Crane	Season 5 Episode 26: "Mother, May I Go Out to Swim?"
1960	Thriller	Mrs. Killburn	"The Mark of the Hand"
1965	The Man from U.N.C.L.E.	Madame Olga Nemirovitch	"The Adriatic Express Affair"
1969	Ironside	Victoria Ironside	"Why the Tuesday Afternoon Bridge Club Met on Thursday"
1971	Mr. and Mrs. Bo Jo Jones	Grandmother Greher	ABC Movie of the Week
1971	Columbo	Mrs. Chadwick	"Lady in Waiting"

== Radio appearances ==
Year	Program	Episode/source
1944	Grand Central Station	NA
1953	Theatre Guild on the Air	Quiet Wedding
