= The Parker Family =

The Parker Family was an American radio soap opera broadcast from 1939 to 1944.

== Characters and story ==
Leon Janney, a child star in films in the 1930s, starred as Richard Parker, a teenage boy growing up in a small midwestern town. Janney (whose character was nicknamed "Richard the Great") also narrated the series, and his character's chronic misunderstandings formed the basis of the stories. Richard lived with his father Walter (Jay Jostyn) and mother Helen (Linda Carlon-Reed, later Marjorie Anderson), as well as his twin sister Nancy (Mitzi Gould) and younger sister Elly (Patricia Ryan). Harry Clark and Hugh James were the announcers.

Don Becker created and produced the program, with Chuck Vincent and Oliver Barbour as directors. Priscilla Kent was the writer.

The program was sponsored by Woodbury Soap and Ipana toothpaste.The theme song was Deep Purple. In the 1940-41 season, The Parker Family finished with a 13.0 rating, good enough for 26th place overall (and winning its Sunday 9:15-9:30 timeslot). In 1941-42, it slipped to 12.8 and 37th place, second in its timeslot to Fred Allen; both seasons, the program had Walter Winchell as a lead-in.

== Airdates and availability ==
The Parker Family aired weekly on CBS from July to October 1939, then switched to NBC Blue (today's ABC), running until April 10, 1944. An experimental video version was aired on NBC-TV on May 9, 1941, with Janney and Gould reprising their radio roles. The soap was also part of a slate of programs (which included a middleweight title fight between Billy Soose and Ken Overlin) shown to a group of 1,200 people at the New Yorker Theatre as an experiment in "theatre television".

Only one episode exists: the one airing on September 21, 1939, and thus preserved on the WJSV broadcast day recordings.
