= WJSV broadcast day =

1939 full-day radio broadcast recording

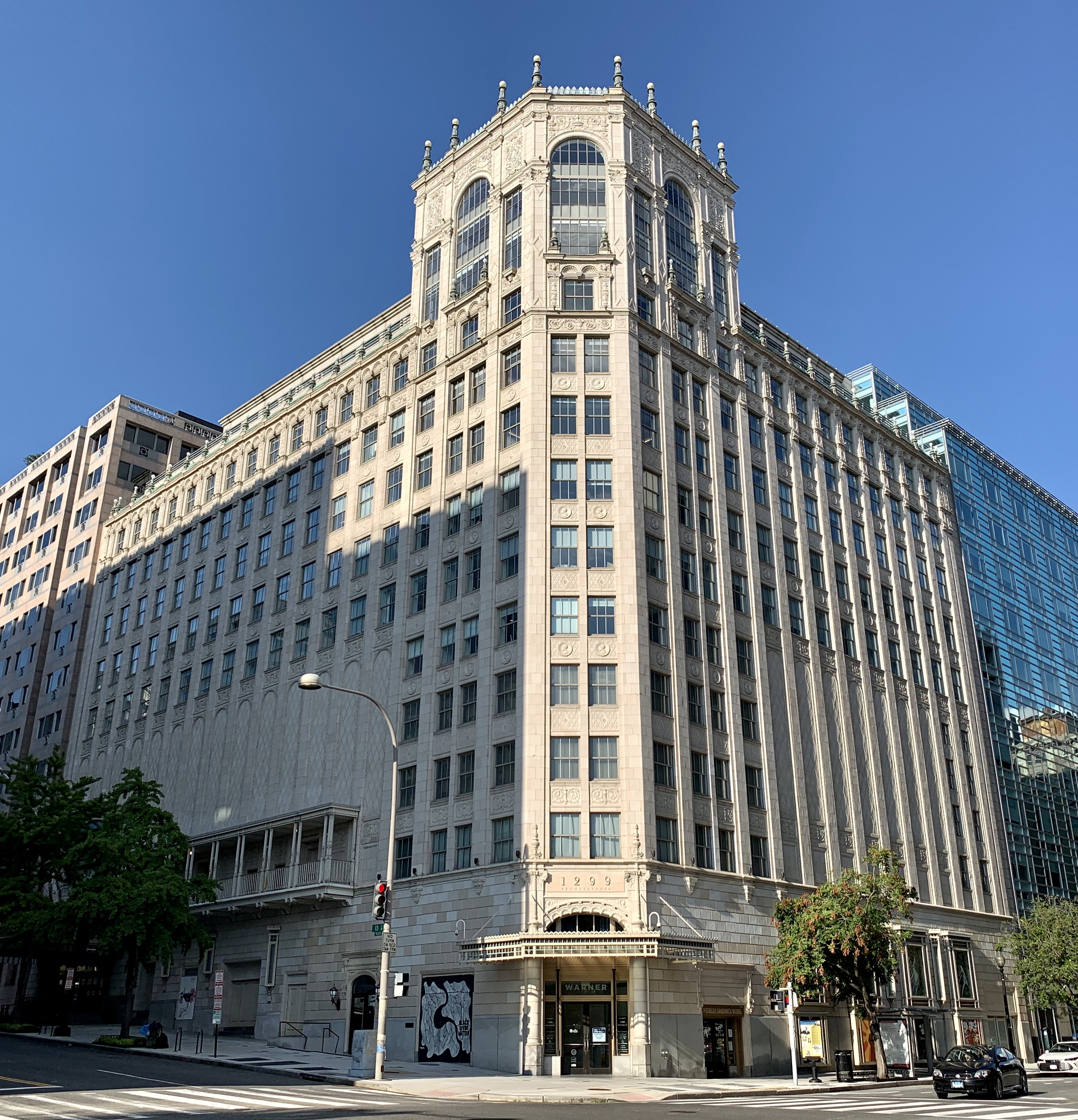
- Entrance to the Warner Building, formerly known as the Earle Building, and in 1939 the location of the WJSV studios in Washington, D.C.
- Genre: Radio programs
- Running time: 19 hours
- Home station: CBS Radio
- Hosted by: WJSV radio station
- Recording studio: 817 Earle Building, 13th and E Streets, NW, Washington, DC
- Original release: September 21, 1939

On September 21, 1939, radio station WJSV in Washington, D.C. made an audio recording of its entire 19-hour broadcast day. This undertaking was a collaboration between the station and the National Archives, and it was the first time that such a comprehensive recording of a radio broadcast had been made. The station then donated its original set of recording discs to the National Archives, giving it a rare and complete artifact from an era frequently called the Golden Age of Radio. Due to their historical significance, the United States Library of Congress has since added these sound recordings to its National Recording Registry.

== Station details ==
In 1939, station WJSV was an owned-and-operated member of the Columbia Broadcasting System (CBS) radio network. At that time there were four major national radio networks in the United States. In Washington, D.C., they were represented by:

Station	Frequency in kilocycles (kilohertz)	Wavelength (meters)	Network affiliation
WMAL	630 kc	476 m	National Broadcasting Company - Blue Network
WRC	950 kc	316 m	National Broadcasting Company - Red Network
WOL	1230 kc	229 m	Mutual Broadcasting System (MBS)
WJSV	1460 kc	206 m	Columbia Broadcasting System (CBS)

(The NBC Blue network would soon be split off and then later become the American Broadcasting Company (ABC))

== Preliminary planning ==
The idea of recording WJSV's entire broadcast day from sign-on to sign-off grew out of ongoing talks between members of the National Archives and station WJSV. Before this project took place members of the National Archives such as John Bradley, the chief of the Division of Motion Pictures and Sound Recordings, and R. D. W. Connor, the Archivist of the United States, discussed the matter with the staff at WJSV, including Ann Gillis, WJSV Publicity Director, and Harry C. Butcher, Vice-President in Charge of the CBS Washington Office. It was agreed that WJSV would record the broadcast at their studio and then donate the finished product to the files of the National Archives.

== Method of recording the day ==
In 1939, the standard way to make an audio recording of a live radio broadcast was by cutting an instantaneous transcription disc, since audio tape recording had not yet been perfected. The typical disc used in this situation was a double-sided 16-inch (41 cm) platter which could record approximately fifteen minutes of audio on each side. A major advantage of cutting an instantaneous disc, as opposed to making a record, was that the disc did not need any further processing to be playable, although unlike a finished record, this disc was so soft it would wear out after a few plays. By late 1939, transcription discs were being used fairly commonly in the industry, even though the networks still aired the majority of their programs live. However, many performers and sponsors were using transcription discs to record their own shows, thus allowing them to later review their programs. In addition, NBC's nighttime series Information Please had just begun recording its shows onto instantaneous discs so that the program could be re-aired later that night on the West Coast. However, nearly all of the programs being recorded ran for only fifteen or thirty minutes, and rarely for more than one hour. Since a disc could only record about fifteen minutes on each side, the job of recording an entire 19-hour broadcast day would require 38 16-inch discs. It would also require having somebody available every fifteen minutes to set up and execute each transcription, and to perform this task a somewhat daunting seventy-six consecutive times over a nineteen-hour period.

== Overview of broadcast day ==
WJSV's broadcast day on Thursday, September 21, 1939 included both the typical and the exceptional. Almost everything that aired was live, and if not it was identified as being "recorded" or "transcribed." This day began as usual with 2 1/2 hours of local programming which featured a mixture of news, talk, commercials and recorded music, much of which was presided over by Arthur Godfrey who, in 1945, became a famous national network radio (and then later television) personality. The day continued into the early afternoon with a succession of 15-minute programs, mainly "serial dramas" supplied by the CBS network. These dramas were characteristically introduced by the sounds of an electric organ, and so many of these shows had a soap product as their sponsor that they were already being collectively dubbed "soap operas". In the evening the schedule line-up switched to mostly longer-form network entertainment programs, offering up comedy, drama, and variety shows, along with some more serious programming. Then late at night the network provided a series of 30-minute orchestra band remotes, usually featuring big bands, from various locations across the country. In addition, news reports were presented throughout the day.

Typical of most radio stations, WJSV also aired some of its own shows, and these local programs would either delay or replace the programs being offered by the CBS network. For example, in its 8:30 a.m. timeslot WJSV ran a locally produced quiz program hosted by John Charles Daly, who was engaged in one of his first quiz show undertakings. Also typical was the number of schedule adjustments that the station had to make during the day, and newspaper radio listings often noted that schedules were subject to last-minute changes. The adjustments required on this day ranged from dealing with technical difficulties to managing the schedule changes which were both occurring locally and coming down from the network. For example, on this day WJSV aired an afternoon Washington Senators baseball game, and the CBS network offered several special broadcasts during the day for the local stations to consider airing.

The most important special broadcast on this day, and the primary reason why this day was chosen for recording, was the live nationwide broadcast of President Franklin Roosevelt's speech that afternoon to a special joint session of Congress, which was taking place against the backdrop of the beginning of World War II. In light of the events, President Roosevelt was calling for the repeal of the current arms embargo provisions of the country's Neutrality Acts. In exchange he proposed adding a provision, commonly dubbed "cash-and-carry," which would again allow belligerent nations to buy munitions from the United States, but only if they paid cash at the time of purchase and then used their own ships to transport these purchases back home. Opponents argued that any modifications of the Neutrality Acts could be a first step in drawing the United States into another war.

The importance of this event was appreciated at the time, and WJSV newscaster Hugh Conover cited it during his 1:00 p.m. Sunshine Reporter newscast as the reason that this particular broadcast day was selected for recording:

A recording, covering a full day of broadcasting at station WJSV, is going to be placed in the files of the National Archives. The special recording is being made today, and this program to which you are now listening is now being recorded and preserved for posterity. The full day's activities, from the opening station announcement at 6:00 o'clock this morning until 1:00 a.m., when "The Star-Spangled Banner" is played, will be recorded. Today was chosen for the record because history will be made in the United States this afternoon. The recording will include the opening of the extra session of Congress and President Roosevelt's speech to that body. Arrangements are also being made to include a speech by Premier Daladier, direct from France, in case President Roosevelt's speech is finished on time.

== Legacy ==
The original set of broadcast recording discs went to the National Archives. Numerous other sites, such as the non-profit website Internet Archive now have copies of these recordings, and these have proven popular with fans of old-time radio, both for their entertainment value and for offering a unique historical record. They offer what is often the only example of some of the shows, performances, and personalities from this period.

In early 2004 the United States Library of Congress announced that the WJSV transcriptions had been chosen as one of the sound recordings selected to its National Recording Registry for 2003.

== WJSV broadcast day schedule ==
WJSV signed on at 6:00 a.m. Eastern Standard Time on Thursday, September 21, 1939, with the opening announcement:

Good morning. This is station WJSV, owned and operated by the Columbia Broadcasting System, with studios in the Earle Building at 13th and E Streets, NW, in the City of Washington. Our transmitting facilities are on the Mount Vernon Memorial Boulevard in historic Alexandria, Virginia, on property leased from the Richmond, Fredericksburg and Potomac Railway company. Station WJSV operates on a frequency of 1460 kilocycles by authority of the Federal Communications Commission.

Note: All times are Eastern Standard Time.
Local WJSV programming is highlighted in yellow. CBS network-sourced programming is highlighted in green.

Time (Duration)	WJSV's September 21, 1939 Schedule	Program Source and Program Type	Primary Sponsoring Product	Additional Information
6:00 AM (30 min.)	Sign-on / Sundial	Local programming: Recorded music	Sustaining (i.e. unsponsored)	A period of dead air occurred between approximately 6:14 and 6:23 a.m. when the station left the air "to make technical adjustments."
6:30 AM (120 min.)	Sundial continues, joined by host Arthur Godfrey. A 5-minute Arrow News Reporter aired at 8:00 a.m.	Local programming: Live talk, news, and recorded music	Various national and local advertisers	Joe King of WJSV was the 8:00 a.m. reporter. Network note: This local programming pre-empted the CBS network's Richard Maxwell (8:00 a.m.) music program and Meet the Dixons (8:15 a.m.) serial drama.
8:30 AM (15 min.)	Certified Magic Carpet	Local programming: Audience quiz (transcribed)	Certified Bread	Note: Host John Charles Daly calls himself simply "Charles Daly" when doing this local program. It was recorded a block away at the Willard Hotel with members of the local Soroptimist Club. Network note: This pre-empted CBS's Manhattan Mother serial drama.
8:45 AM (15 min.)	Bachelor's Children	CBS network: Serial drama	Old Dutch cleanser	Today's story: A discussion of plans to bring a bill before the legislature for a proposed sanitarium.
9:00 AM (15 min.)	Pretty Kitty Kelly	CBS network: Serial drama	Wonder Bread	Today's story: Kitty is in jail for murder and foreign spies are suspected. A search continues for the gun.
9:15 AM (15 min.)	Myrt and Marge	CBS network: Serial drama	Super Suds granulated soap	Narrator: "The world of the theater, and the world of life, and the story of two women who seek fame in the one and contentment in the other." Today's story: Work on a new show begins, but there are concerns.
9:30 AM (15 min.)	Hilltop House	CBS network: Serial drama	Palmolive soap	Narrator: "The story of a woman who must choose between love and the career of raising other women's children." Today's story: John's detested sister-in-law has a request.
9:45 AM (15 min.)	Stepmother	CBS network: Serial drama	Colgate tooth powder	Narrator: "Can a stepmother successfully raise another woman's children?" Today's story: Mrs. Clark plots a dastardly scheme.
10:00 AM (15 min.)	CBS News report / Mary Lee Taylor	CBS network: CBS news / Cooking recipes	Pet Evaporated Milk	Robert Trout reported the war news. Because a sponsor, and not the network, in effect "owned" a given time period, CBS thanked the Pet Milk company for relinquishing part of its time. Today's recipe: Stuffed vanilla wafers.
10:15 AM (15 min.)	Brenda Curtis	CBS network: Serial drama	Campbell's chicken noodle soup	Today's story: Brenda has a chance to return to the stage. But her husband objects, even as he worries over a court case.
10:30 AM (15 min.)	Big Sister	CBS network: Serial drama	Rinso soap powder	Today's story: A marriage approaches, and concern arises over a child's mystery illness.
10:45 AM (15 min.)	Aunt Jenny's Real Life Stories	CBS network: Week-long dramatic stories	Spry vegetable shortening	This week's story: A woman is conflicted between two men. Tomorrow, the solution is revealed. Narrator: "True names are never used in Spry's Real Life Stories."
11:00 AM (15 min.)	Jean Abbey	Local programming: Woman's Home Companion radio shopper	Items at S. Kann Sons (Kann's) department store	Note: "Jean Abbey" was a pseudonym for Meredith Howard, who often used it for broadcasting and publishing purposes. Network note: This local program pre-empted CBS's serial drama Joyce Jordan, Girl Interne, which on Tuesdays and Thursdays ran unsponsored on the network. (Local program listings from that period show that some stations aired alternate shows on those two days, others did not.)
11:15 AM (15 min.)	When a Girl Marries	CBS network: Serial drama	Prudential Insurance Company of America	Narrator: "Dedicated to all those who are in love ... and to those who can remember." Today's story: A new apartment, marriage news, and Andy is holding on to an incriminating letter.
11:30 AM (15 min.)	The Romance of Helen Trent	CBS network: Serial drama	Angelus lipstick	Today's story: Helen's plans to open a dress shop compel her to take on an unwanted employee.
11:45 AM (15 min.)	Our Gal, Sunday	CBS network: Serial drama	Anacin aspirin	Narrator: "The story that asks the question, 'Can this girl from a little mining town in the West find happiness as the wife of a wealthy and titled Englishman?' " Today's story: Hospital plans, and a surprising transfer request.
12:00 PM (15 min.)	The Goldbergs	CBS network: Serial drama	Oxydol soap powder	Today's story: The Goldbergs are being driven back to New York by a mysterious and unsettling driver. Sponsor note: Procter & Gamble, a major radio advertiser, sponsored all four shows that made up the following one-hour programming block.
12:15 PM (15 min.)	Life Can Be Beautiful	CBS network: Serial drama	Ivory Flakes soap flakes	Today's story: Good news comes after a difficult search for work.
12:30 PM (15 min.)	Road of Life	CBS network: Serial drama	Chipso soap flakes	Narrator: "Dr. Brent, call surgery. Dr. Brent, call surgery. Dr. Brent, call surgery ..."; Today's story: The murder trial begins for an eleven-year-old boy.
12:45 PM (15 min.)	This Day is Ours	CBS network: Serial drama	Crisco vegetable shortening	Today's story: Eleanor worries that marrying her unemployed boyfriend could leave her as bitter as her friend.
1:00 PM (15 min.)	Sunshine Reporter	Local programming: News	Sunshine Krispy crackers	Hugh Conover of WJSV reports. (The first couple minutes of this program are absent.); Network note: This local program pre-empted CBS's Doc Barclay's Daughters.
1:15 PM (15 min.)	The Life and Love of Dr. Susan	CBS network: Serial drama	Lux toilet soap	Today's story: Dr. Susan Chandler helps out a baseball player, but makes an enemy of the mayor's wife.
1:30 PM (15 min.)	Your Family and Mine	CBS network: Serial drama	Sealtest, Inc. dairy products	Today's story: Judy stands by Woody, hoping an operation has restored his eyesight, even as Steve proclaims his love for her.
1:45 PM (75 min.)	"Cash-and-Carry" speech President Roosevelt's address to a special joint session of Congress, calling for an end to the United States' arms embargo on warring nations	CBS network: News special	Unsponsored	Preceded by interviews by CBS's Albert Warner with Sen. Warren Austin, Rep. Bruce Barton, and Sen. James Byrnes. Followed-up by the concluding portion of a live speech by shortwave by French Premier Daladier (in French), and then a brief English summary translation. Network note: The CBS network's 15-minute music program Mellow Moments, planned for 1:45 p.m, was pre-empted. Also pre-empted was the weekly 2:00 p.m. 30-minute CBS network program of United States Army Band music. In addition, a planned 2:30 p.m. 30-minute Pan-American Day speech by Cordell Hull, the U.S. Secretary of State, from the New York World's Fair was rescheduled to the next day. (The speech would have pre-empted the usual weekly 2:30 p.m. 30-minute CBS network music program featuring Clyde Barrie and the Leon Goldman ensemble.)
3:00 PM (10 min.)	Follow-up interviews	Local programming: News analysis and interviews	Unsponsored	Follow-up interviews by CBS's Albert Warner with Rep. William B. Bankhead (Speaker of the House), Rep. J. William Ditter, and Rep. Mary Norton.
3:10 PM (15 min.)	The Career of Alice Blair	Local programming: Syndicated serial drama (transcribed)	Daggett and Ramsdell cold cream	Postponed from its usual 2:00 p.m. D.C. airing. Network note: The local WJSV programming which ran from 3:00 to 3:45 pre-empted both a CBS network's sports special airing of the Mont d'Or Handicap handicap horse race at Belmont Park, plus the CBS network's Alabama Polytechnic Roundtable, a special broadcast featuring a discussion between agricultural and manufacturing interests. Today's story: Alice is wary of the neighbor with whom her uncle has tea.
3:25 PM (5 min.)	Arrow News Reporter	Local programming: News	Arrow Beer	Joe King of WJSV did the reporting. Postponed from its usual 2:15 p.m. D.C. airing.
3:30 PM (15 min.)	Rhythm and Romance	Local programming: Transcribed music	Zlotnick the Furrier; Manhattan Laundry; The Women (1939)	Program's narration provided by Joe King (WJSV). Postponed from its usual 2:20 p.m. D.C. airing.
3:45 PM (15 min.)	Scattergood Baines	CBS network: Serial drama (transcribed from the previous day)	Wrigley's spearmint gum	Postponed from its usual 1:45 p.m. D.C. airing (as a delayed broadcast of the live 4:45 p.m. CBS airing of the previous day.); Network note: This local WJSV broadcast pre-empted a CBS network music presentation of the Four Clubmen music program. Today's story: A scheme to rid the town of a gambler continues.
4:00 PM (77 min.)	Washington Senators baseball game—Cleveland Indians at Washington (joined in progress)	Local programming: Sports	Wheaties cereal	Joined in progress in the last half of the 4th inning. The WJSV sports announcer was Harry McTigue and Walter Johnson did the play-by-play. Cleveland won 6–3, and a case of Wheaties was awarded to Washington player Charlie Gelbert for his 7th inning home run. Network note: This local WJSV broadcast pre-empted several CBS network programs, which, according to other cities' listings from that day, began with Genevieve Rowe. The pre-emptions continued with Patterns in Swing, March of Games, Scattergood Baines and the news with Edwin C. Hill.
5:17 PM (13 min.)	The World Dances	Local programming: Transcribed music	Equitable Credit Co.	Postponed from its usual 5:00 p.m. D.C. airing. Network note: This local program pre-empted the CBS network's 5:15 p.m. news broadcast by H. V. Kaltenborn (CBS News).
5:30 PM (5 min.)	Arrow News Reporter	Local programming: News	Arrow Beer	Hugh Conover of WJSV did the reporting. Network note: The local WJSV programming which ran this day from 5:30 to 6:00 p.m. pre-empted the CBS network's special religious broadcast, the Day of Atonement Service.
5:35 PM (10 min.)	Time Out	Local programming: Organ interlude	Zlotnick the Furrier	Performed on a Hammond electric organ by Johnny Salb, WJSV staff organist.
5:45 PM (15 min.)	Goodrich Sports Reporter	Local programming: Sports news	B. F. Goodrich	Reported by WJSV sports announcer Harry McTigue. Network note: This local sports report would normally pre-empt CBS's Judith Arlen's Penthouse Blues.
6:00 PM (15 min.)	Amos 'n' Andy	CBS network: Serial comedy/drama	Campbell's Tomato soup	The network feed of this show had an initial 3-minute gap which was covered locally by a transcribed organ interlude. Today's story: Complications arise over a singing recital.
6:15 PM (15 min.)	The Parker Family	CBS network: Comedy	Woodbury facial soap	This week: Junior mistakenly believes his parents are divorcing. Hilarity ensues.
6:30 PM (30 min.)	Joe E. Brown	CBS network: Comedy/variety	Post Toasties cereal	Comedy sketches and music. With Frank Gill and Bill Demling (Gill and Demling), Margaret McCrae, Paula Winslow, and Harry Sosnik and his Orchestra. The announcer was Don Wilson.
7:00 PM (30 min.)	Ask-It Basket	CBS network: Audience quiz	Colgate dental cream	Four contestants were selected from the audience. A sailor, a student, a stenographer and a department store buyer competed for cash by answering questions sent in by the radio audience. Hosted by Jim McWilliams.
7:30 PM (25 min.)	Strange as It Seems	CBS network: Human interest	Palmolive shave cream	Stories were told that ranged from the unusual to the inspirational. The show was based on the cartoon panel of the same name. Hosted by Alois Havrilla.
7:55 PM (5 min.)	Elmer Davis and the News	CBS network: News	(Sustaining)	Today's war-related news.
8:00 PM (60 min.)	Major Bowes' Original Amateur Hour	CBS network: Talent contest	Chrysler products, this week featuring the new 1940 Plymouth	This night's contestants consisted of an assortment of musicians, vocalists and one young tap dancer. This week's designated "honor city" was Mansfield, Ohio. Bowes read a profile of the city, and Mansfield residents had a dedicated phone number for voting. Note: The performance of "Over the Rainbow" was one of several musical numbers heard on this broadcast day which came from the just-released The Wizard of Oz movie.
9:00 PM (30 min.)	Columbia Workshop Festival	CBS network: Radio play	(Sustaining)	This week's episode, part of the Workshop's third annual summer festival, featured Now It's Summer, an original radio play by Arthur Kober. Network note: The radio play originally planned for this date was Timothy Dexter by J. P. Marquand. Coincidentally, Dexter's unusual dealings were profiled earlier in the evening on a segment of Strange as It Seems.
9:30 PM (30 min.)	Americans at Work	CBS network: Educational	(Sustaining)	This series was presented by the CBS Department of Education as part of CBS's Adult Education Series. This week's episode explored the work of five different auctioneers. Network note: This episode had initially been scheduled for Saturday, September 23.
10:00 PM (5 min.)	Arrow News Reporter	Local programming: News	Arrow Beer	Hugh Conover of WJSV did the reporting.
10:05 PM (10 min.)	The Human Side of the News	CBS network: CBS news	Amoco gasoline products	Reported by Edwin C. Hill. Updates on the war in Europe.
10:15 PM (15 min.)	Streamline Interlude	Local programming: Transcribed music	Zlotnick the Furrier	Network note: This local program pre-empted the CBS network's presentation of Cab Calloway's Orchestra.
10:30 PM (15 min.)	Mid-Week Review	Local programming: News analysis	(Sustaining)	Presented by CBS's D.C. correspondent, Albert Warner. Note: In spite of Warner's network connections, program listings show that this was a local weekly program which pre-empted the first half of CBS's presentation of Hal Kemp's Orchestra.
10:45 PM (36 min.)	Rebroadcast of President Roosevelt's address to a special session of Congress	Local programming: Political speech (transcribed)	Unsponsored	Network note: This local rebroadcast pre-empted the second half of the CBS network's presentation of Hal Kemp's Orchestra, and most of the subsequent CBS program, Jerry Livingston's Orchestra.
11:21 PM (9 min.)	Jerry Livingston's Orchestra (joined in progress)	CBS network: Orchestra remote	(Sustaining)	Joined in progress with 9 minutes remaining. Originating from Mother Kelly's Miami Room in New York City.
11:30 PM (30 min.)	Teddy Powell's Orchestra	CBS network: Orchestra remote	(Sustaining)	Originating from the Famous Door nightclub in New York City.
12:00 AM (30 min.)	Louis Prima's Orchestra	CBS network: Orchestra remote	(Sustaining)	Originating from the Hickory House in New York City.
12:30 AM (25 min.)	Bob Chester's Orchestra	CBS network: Orchestra remote	(Sustaining)	Originating from the Mayfair Restaurant of the Hotel Van Cleve in Dayton, Ohio.
12:55 AM (5 min.)	CBS News	CBS network: News	(Sustaining)	Presented by George Putnam, CBS news correspondent.
1:00 AM (3 min.)	Weather / National Anthem / Sign-off	Local programming		
