= Chicago Theater of the Air =

American radio program (1940–1954)

The Chicago Theater of the Air
- Genre: Operetta and musical theater
- Country of origin: United States
- Language: English
- Home station: WGN
- Syndicates: Mutual
- Hosted by: Col. Robert R. McCormick
- Directed by: William A. Bacher; Jack LaFrandre; Joe Ainley
- Original release: May 9, 1940 – May 7, 1955

Chicago Theater of the Air is a weekly American radio program that featured hour-long operettas and musical theater. It first ran locally in May 1940 on WGN radio in Chicago and then nationally as an unsponsored show on the Mutual Broadcasting System from October 5, 1940, to September 11, 1954.

The show grew out of listener surveys conducted by WGN that showed that many listeners enjoyed opera and drama. The show combined both into 60-minute operettas. Intermission commentary was originally by conductor Henry Weber and later by Chicago publisher Robert R. McCormick. For seven years, Henry Weber's wife, Marion Claire Weber sang on the show.

As the program began its seventh season, McCormick commented on its growth:

Three years ago, the demand for tickets to these broadcasts became so great that our original auditorium studio became entirely inadequate. Then, too, the program itself outgrew the studio, as the size of the orchestra, chorus, and dramatic cast became larger and larger to meet the requirements of more complicated productions. So it was decided to move ... to ... the Medinah Temple. Here we can accommodate nearly 5,000 guests each week and have the necessary facilities for any type of production.

Actors who appeared on the program included Marilou Neumayer, Barbara Luddy, Bret Morrison, Bob Jellison, Willard Waterman, Marvin Mueller, and Olan Soule.

Beginning January 12, 1949, many of the people involved in Chicago Theater of the Air also put on Comedy Playhouse, "a fast-paced half hour show featuring top Broadway comedy hits" on Mutual.
