= Cipher disk =

Encryption and decryption tool consisting of two metal plates with alphabets

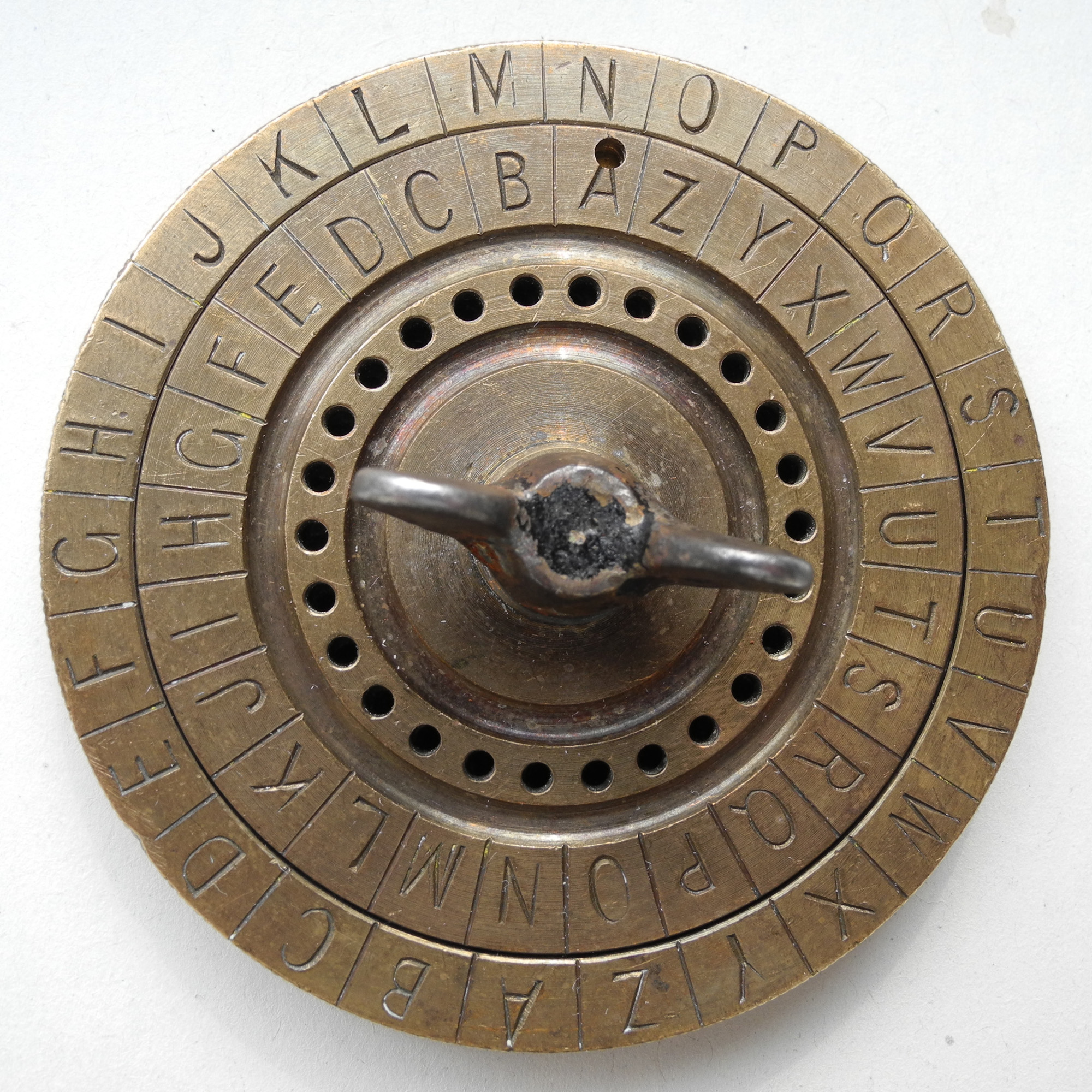
A metal cipher disk

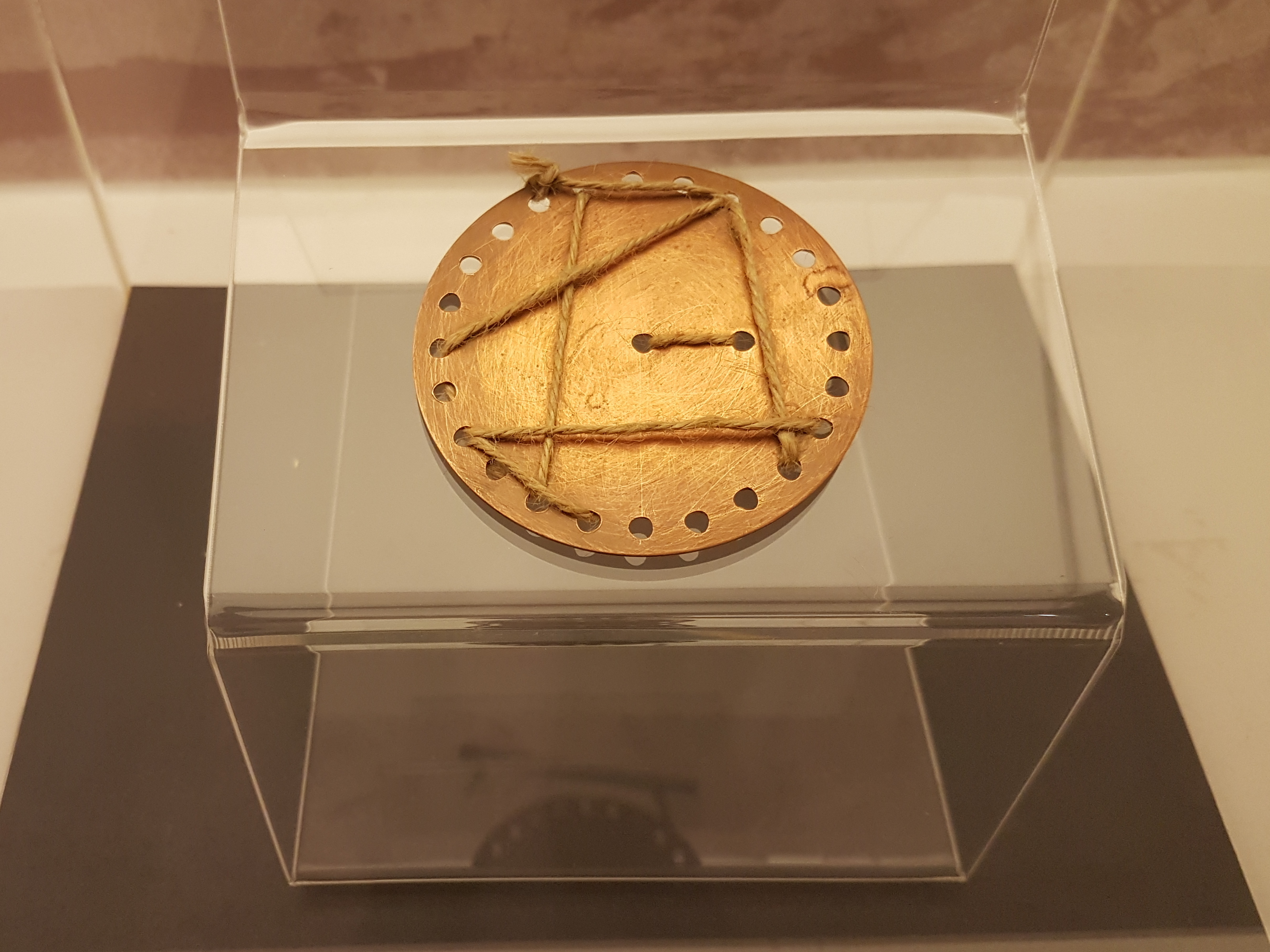
Reconstruction of an Aeneas cipher disk, 5th century BC, Thessaloniki Science Center and Technology Museum

A cipher disk is an enciphering and deciphering tool developed in 1470 by the Italian architect and author Leon Battista Alberti. He constructed a device, (eponymously called the Alberti cipher disk) consisting of two concentric circular plates mounted one on top of the other. The larger plate is called the "stationary" and the smaller one the "moveable" since the smaller one could move on top of the "stationary".

The first incarnation of the disk had plates made of copper and featured the alphabet, in order, inscribed on the outer edge of each disk in cells split evenly along the circumference of the circle. This enabled the two alphabets to move relative to each other creating an easy-to-use key. Rather than using an impractical and complicated table indicating the encryption method, one could use the much simpler cipher disk. This made both encryption and decryption faster, simpler and less prone to error.

== Methods of encryption ==
The cipher disk can be used in one of two ways. The code can be a consistent monoalphabetic substitution for the entire cipher or the disks can be moved periodically throughout the cipher making it polyalphabetic. For a monoalphabetic use, the sender and the person receiving the messages would agree on a cipher key setting (e.g., the "G" in the regular alphabet would be positioned next to the "Q" in the cipher alphabet). The entire message is then encoded according to this key.

In addition to simple substitution ciphers, the cipher disk opened the way for convenient polyalphabetic ciphers. An easy way to do this is for the sender and the recipient to agree that a certain number of characters into the message, the scales would be shifted one character to the right, repeating the procedure every (say) tenth letter. This would make the message much more difficult to decrypt.

== Variations ==
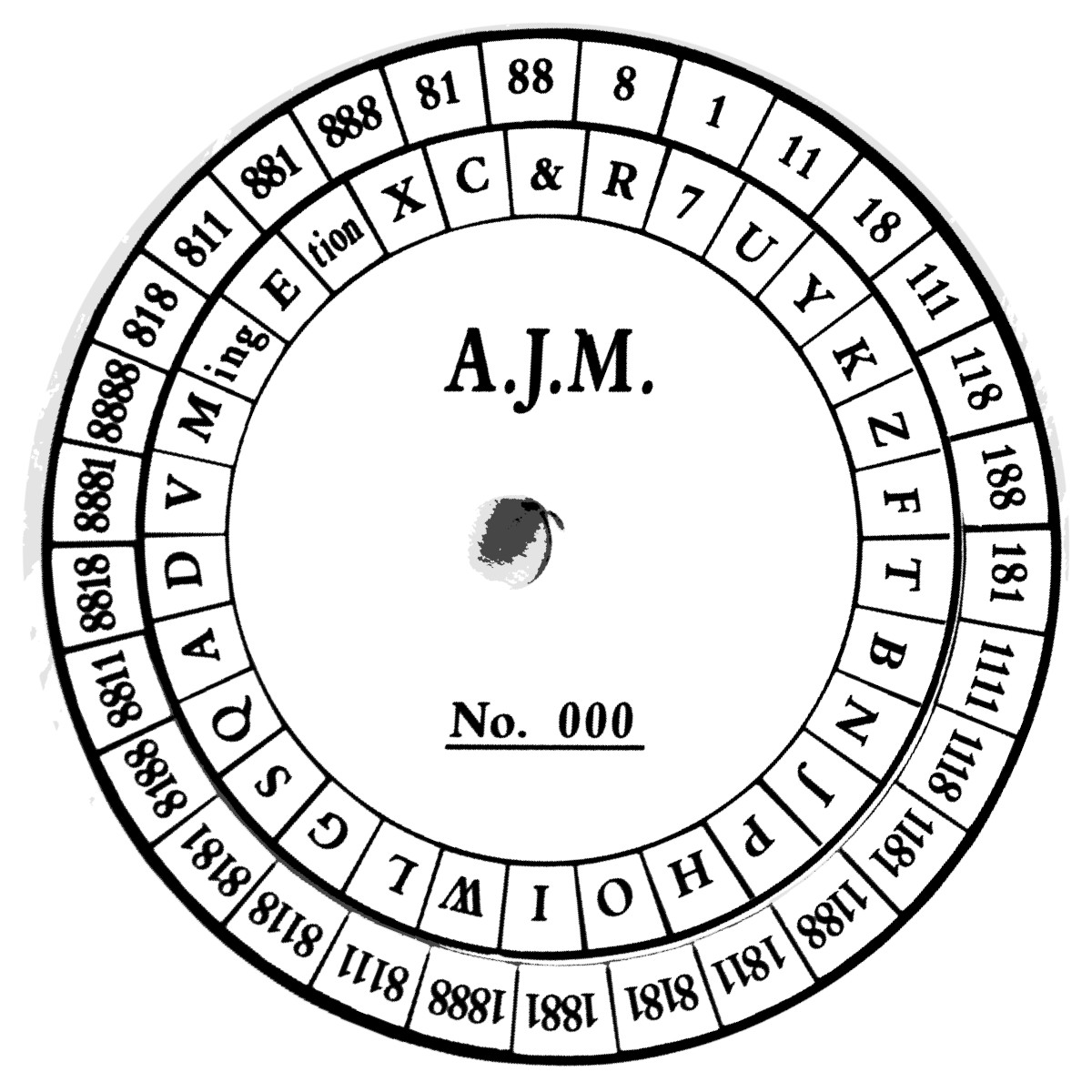
Modern representation of the Union Cipher Disk, from the American Civil War, which was 3.75 inches (95 mm) in diameter and made of light yellow heavy card stock. It consisted of two concentric disks of unequal size revolving on a central pivot. The disks were divided along their outer edges into 30 equal compartments. The smaller inner disk contained letters, terminations and word pauses, while the outer disk contained groups of signal numbers. For easier recognition, the number eight represented two. The initials A.J.M. represent the Chief Signal Officer General Albert J. Myer. Each disk had a control number used for accountability.

Cipher disks had many small variations on the basic design. Instead of letters it would occasionally use combinations of numbers on the outer disk with each combination corresponding to a letter. To make the encryption especially hard to crack, the advanced cipher disk would only use combinations of two numbers. Instead of 1 and 2 though, 1 and 8 were used since these numerals look the same upside down (as things often are on a cipher disk) as they do right side up.

Cipher disks would also add additional symbols for commonly used combinations of letters like "ing", "tion", and "ed". Symbols were also frequently added to indicate "and" at the end of a word.

== Weaknesses ==
When encoding a message using a cipher disk, a character is always used to mean “end of word.” The frequency of said character is abnormally high and thus easily detected. If this character, however, is omitted, then the words run together and it takes much longer for the recipient to read the message. To remedy this, some cipher disks now have multiple characters that stand for "end of word." Similarly a cipher disk may also have multiple characters that could be used for the letter "e" (the most common letter in English) so that instead of having a character with a frequency of roughly 13%, there would be two characters that stood for "e" - each with a frequency of 6% or so. Users could also use a keyword so that all the characters including the letter e would change throughout the ciphertext.

== Popular culture ==
Since the 1930s, cipher disks have been labeled "decoders" and have been used for novelties. Many of the cipher disks that were radio premiums were called "secret decoder rings."

== See also ==
- Alberti cipher disk, also known as formula
