= Ann of the Airlanes =

Advertisement for the syndicated Ann of the Airlanes from the September 25, 1950, edition of the Gastonia Gazette (Gastonia, North Carolina) informing listeners of the series on Gastonia's station WGNC.

Ann of the Airlanes is a syndicated American radio adventure drama series broadcast in the mid-1930s. It "was one of the earliest adolescent broadcast features With a heroine in-stead of a hero as its protagonist."

== Characters and story ==
The story focused on Ann Burton, an aspiring airplane hostess portrayed by Lynne Howard (possibly a stage name for Hollywood native Elia Braca). She also worked with the Secret Service, as did her romantic interest, Interstate Airlines pilot Jack Baker (Robert C. Bruce). Gerald Mohr portrayed Secret Service agent and co-pilot Art Morrison. Also in the cast was John Gibson who portrayed Pete.

There were more than a few radio aviation dramas during the 1930s, but this was the only one with a female lead.

== Production ==
The transcribed series was created by Bob Burtt and produced by Comet Productions. It consisted of 65 episodes for a 13-week run. John. E. Frank was the director.

In 1955 Harry S. Goodman Productions acquired the rights to Ann of the Airlanes and three other juvenile radio programs. The company planned to offer them to stations individually or as a package.

== Listen to ==
- Internet Archive: Ann of the Airlanes
