= Boxtop =

Upper Portion of a product box used as proof of purchase

A boxtop, in the context of being a proof of purchase, is understood to be the upper portion of a product box, detached, and mailed as part of a claim for a radio premium or other advertising offer.

Betty Crocker was a leader in the mail-in boxtop space beginning in 1929 with a coupon promotion in flour bags. Their coupon catalog allowed loyal customers to mail in either money or coupons to purchase items in the Betty Crocker Catalog. By 1937, they began printing their coupons on the outside of their box packaging with a point system towards a discount on a broad range of catalog items including kitchenware, cookbooks, and home goods.

During the 1930s through 1960s, cereal boxtops were usually the most common proofs of purchase used to claim such premiums. (UPCs, which debuted in the 1970s, later served this purpose.)

Popular cereal boxtops of the period were Wheaties, which sponsored Jack Armstrong, the All-American Boy; Kellogg's Pep, which sponsored The Adventures of Superman; Ralston-Purina, which sponsored Tom Mix Ranston Straight Shooters; and various General Mills, particularly Cheerios and Kix, which sponsored The Lone Ranger.

== Box Tops for Education ==
General Mills (which now also owns the cereal assets of Ralston-Purina) currently markets its boxtop redemption program toward educational institutions; the program is currently known as Box Tops for Education.
