= Secret decoder ring =

Device for decoding a substitution cipher

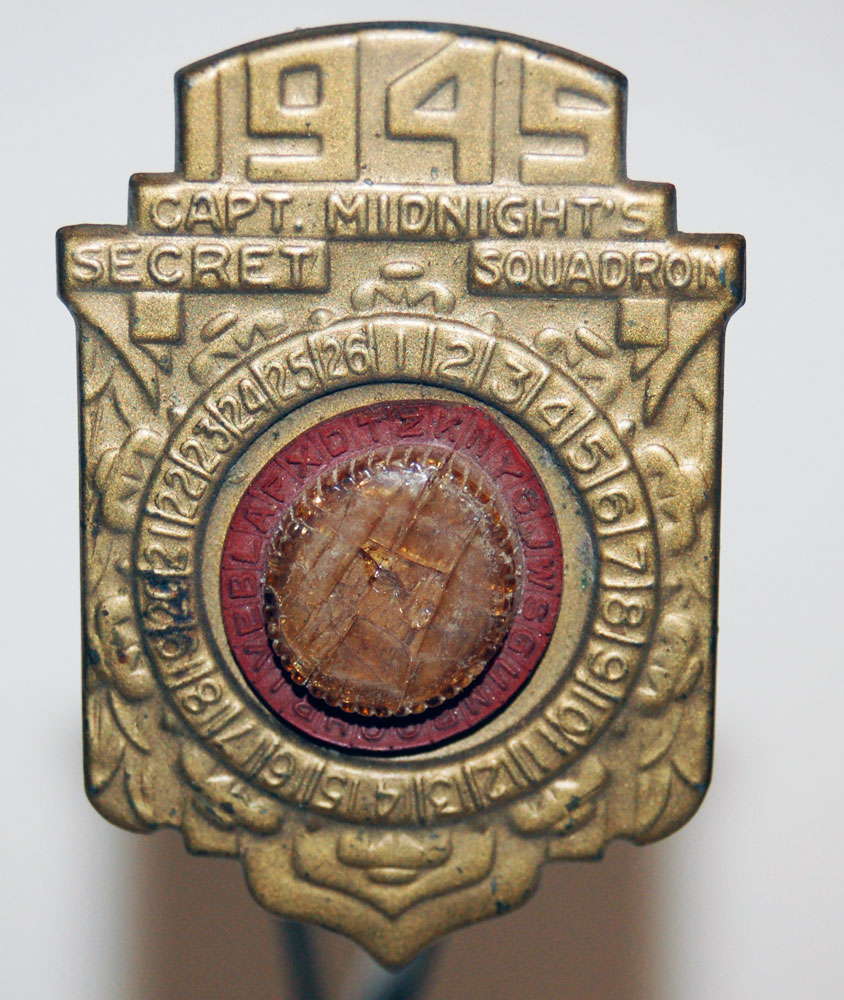
A Captain Midnight decoder badge

A secret decoder ring (or secret decoder) is a device that allows one to decode a simple substitution cipher, or to encrypt a message by working in the opposite direction.

As inexpensive toys, secret decoders have often been used as promotional items by retailers, as well as radio and television programs, from the 1930s through to the current day. Decoders, whether badges or rings, are an entertaining way for children to tap into a common fascination with encryption, ciphers, and secret codes, and are used to send hidden messages back and forth to one another.

== History ==
Secret decoders are generally circular scales, descendants of the cipher disk developed in the 15th century by Leon Battista Alberti. Rather than the complex polyalphabetic Alberti cipher method, the decoders for children invariably use simple Caesar cipher substitutions.

The most well-known example started in 1934 with the Ovaltine company's sponsored radio program Little Orphan Annie. The show's fan club, "Radio Orphan Annie's Secret Society", distributed a member's handbook that included a simple substitution cipher with a resulting numeric cipher text. This was followed the next year with a membership pin that included a cipher disk—enciphering the letters A–Z to numbers 1–26. From 1935 to 1940, metal decoders were produced for the promotion. From 1941 on, paper decoders were produced. Similar metal badges and pocket decoders continued with the Captain Midnight radio and television programs.

None of these early decoders were in the form of finger rings; however, "secret compartment" rings were common radio program premiums. In the early 1960s, secret decoder rings appeared—notably in conjunction with the Jonny Quest television program sponsored by PF Shoes. A later, less ornate, decoder ring was offered by Kix Cereals.

Today, high quality, stainless steel decoder rings for children and adults are being produced by companies such as Retroworks and ThinkGeek.

== Messages ==
Ovaltine and other companies that marketed early decoders to children often included "secret messages" on their radio shows aimed at children. These could be decoded for a preview of the next episode of the show.

== Film references ==
The film A Christmas Story (1983) depicts the Little Orphan Annie radio show transmitting a secret message that deciphered to: "Be sure to drink your Ovaltine", unlike the actual broadcasts' secret code segments, which usually previewed the upcoming episode.

== See also ==
- Caesar cipher – Simple and widely known encryption technique
- Cipher disk – Encryption and decryption tool consisting of two metal plates with alphabets
- Jefferson disk – Cipher system attributed to Thomas Jefferson
- Radio premium – Advertising gimmick
