= Hop Harrigan =

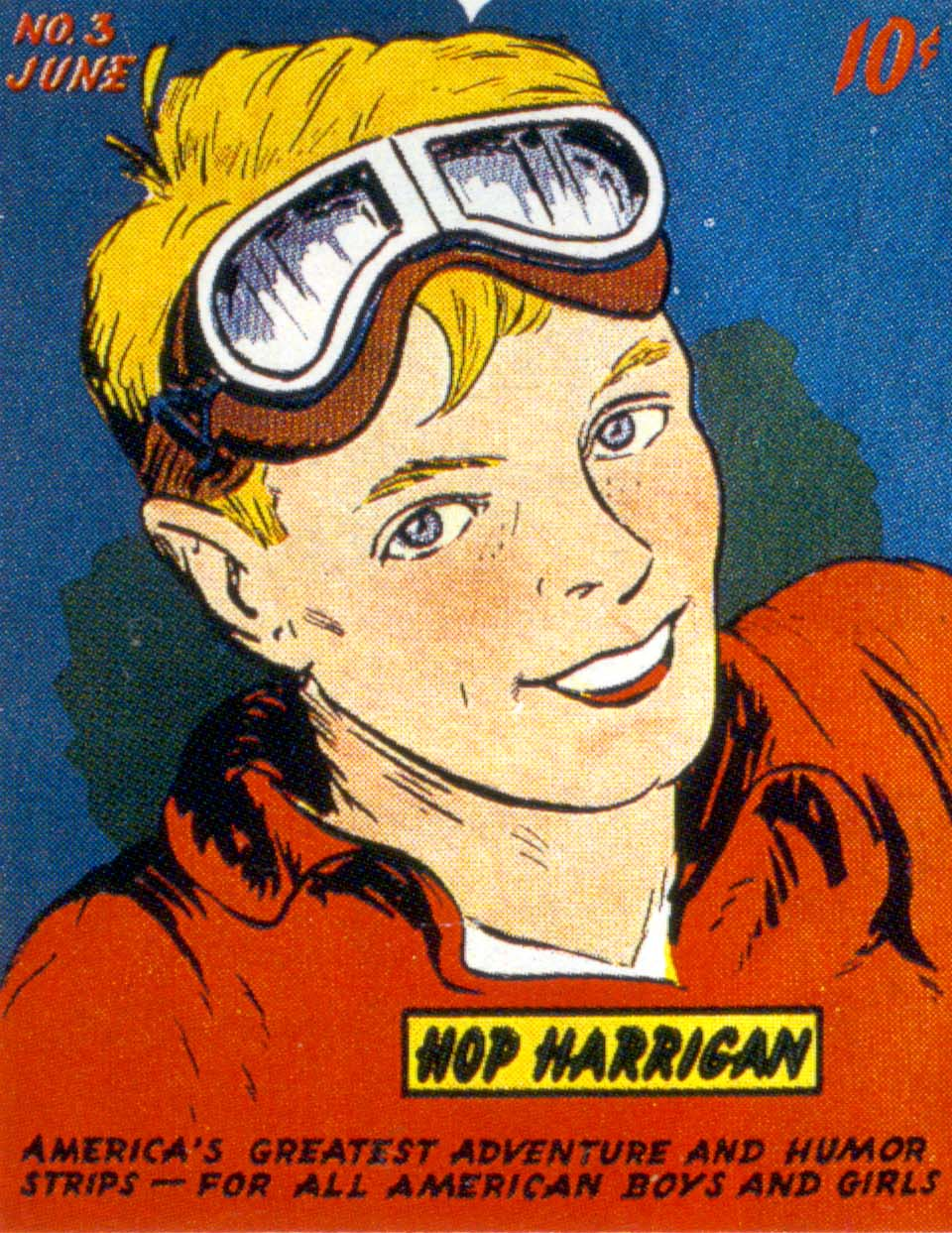
- Hop Harrigan on the cover of All-American Comics #3 (June 1939), art by Sheldon Mayer

Publication information
- Publisher: DC Comics
- First appearance: All-American Comics #1 (April 1939)
- Created by: Jon Blummer

In-story information
- Alter ego: Hop Harrigan
- Notable aliases: The Guardian Angel; Black Lamp
- Abilities: Aviation

Hop Harrigan (also known as The Guardian Angel and Black Lamp) is a fictional character published by All-American Publications. He appeared in American comic books, radio serials and film serials. He was created by Jon Blummer, and was a popular comic book character during World War II.

== Publication history ==
The character first appeared in the anthology comic book series All American Comics #1 (April 1939) by the All-American Publications publishing company, as one of the early aviation heroes in comic history. He was a recurring character, appearing in many magazines including anthology magazines like All-Flash, All-Star Comics, Green Lantern, Mutt & Jeff, Wonder Woman, Comic Cavalcade, Sensation Comics and Flash Comics.

For a brief period in 1941, Blummer considered turning Hop Harrigan into a superhero, as many other strips were converting to follow the new trend. Harrigan appeared in costume from March to July, and then Blummer dropped the idea.

== Fictional summary ==
Hop Harrigan had been orphaned by his father, a legendary pilot, who disappeared on a flight to South America to see his wife. Hop's story begins with him being raised by his neighbor, the cruel farmer Silas Crane, who gets legal guardianship of him to obtain Hop's inheritance.

When Hop Harrigan is a teenager, Crane tries to destroy a biplane that had once been in the possession of Hop's father. Seeing this, Hop angrily knocks the old man to the ground and escapes in the biplane, not planning to return. He arrives at an airport where he saves the life of mechanic Tank Tinker, who became his friend and companion. Tank gives Harrigan his nickname when he said, "Some hop, Harrigan".

Later, Hop, Tank and Prop Wash (the pilot who accidentally endangers Tank), along with help from an heiress (who later becomes Hop's girlfriend), set up the All-American Aviation Company, and they have a variety of exciting adventures. Hop briefly takes on the costumed identity of the Guardian Angel.

By the time World War II comes, as with most other comics of the time, the Hop Harrigan comic has World War II themed adventures as Hop, Tank and Prop join the US Army Air Corps in service of the war effort.

Shortly after the war, the character appears for a while under the alias the Black Lamp.

=== 21st century ===
Hop Harrigan returns in the pages of Batman: The Brave and the Bold vol. 2 #1-3 when a mysterious package containing a ring & a map with the secret message 'Save Me' is sent to Clark Kent, who as Superman travels to the coordinates, finding a hidden mountain fortress known as the Eidos Citadel. After infiltrating the citadel, Superman is incapacitated within a Kryptonite dungeon with Harrigan, who apparently hasn't aged. Harrigan reveals he and Tank crashed while pursuing a villain named Robomb, and while Hop survived, Tank perished from his injuries in the crash. The capture of Harrigan and Superman is revealed to be the plot of Dr. Anthelme, who intend to erase Superman from the memory of the world the same way he erased Harrigan (who at the time of his disappearance had a popular TV series including toy 'decoder rings' that fans would wear). While Superman is being tortured by Anthelme, Harrigan uses the ring returned to him by Superman to escape, rescuing a still-weak Superman from Anthelme before taking off in a plane. However, it is revealed that he has forgotten how to fly due to manipulation from Dr. Anthelme and the plane crashes in the ocean. Superman survives, but with no memory of Harrigan or even what he was doing before being rescued by a cargo ship.

== In other media ==
- Hop Harrigan appears in a self-titled radio series, voiced by Chester Stratton.
- Hop Harrigan appears in a self-titled film serial, portrayed by William Bakewell.
