= Box Tops for Education =

Fundraising program

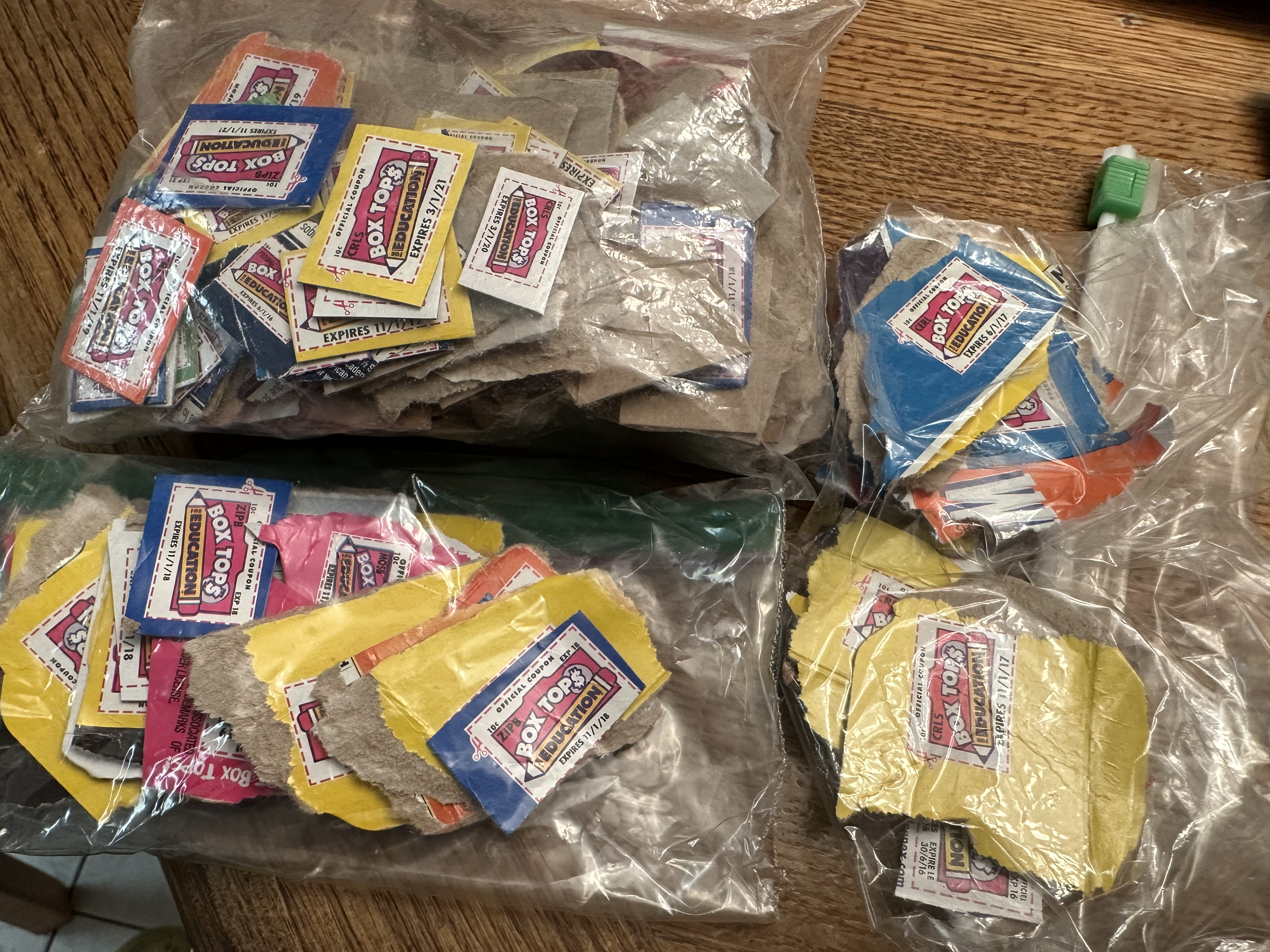
Bags of boxtops

The Box Tops for Education (BTFE) program is an American school fundraising program sponsored by General Mills. Schools can earn 10 cents for every qualifying product purchased by parents and turned in to the school. The program began in California in 1996 as a way for schools to earn money through collecting coupons, known as boxtops, from participating products. By 2001, the program had distributed over $50 million to participating schools. As of 2016, it was considered the largest education cause marketing campaign, and given away almost $1 billion to schools as of 2024.

In 2019, the program switched from physical box tops to a mobile application. Since this change, rates of redemption have fallen.
