= Radio premium =

Advertising gimmick

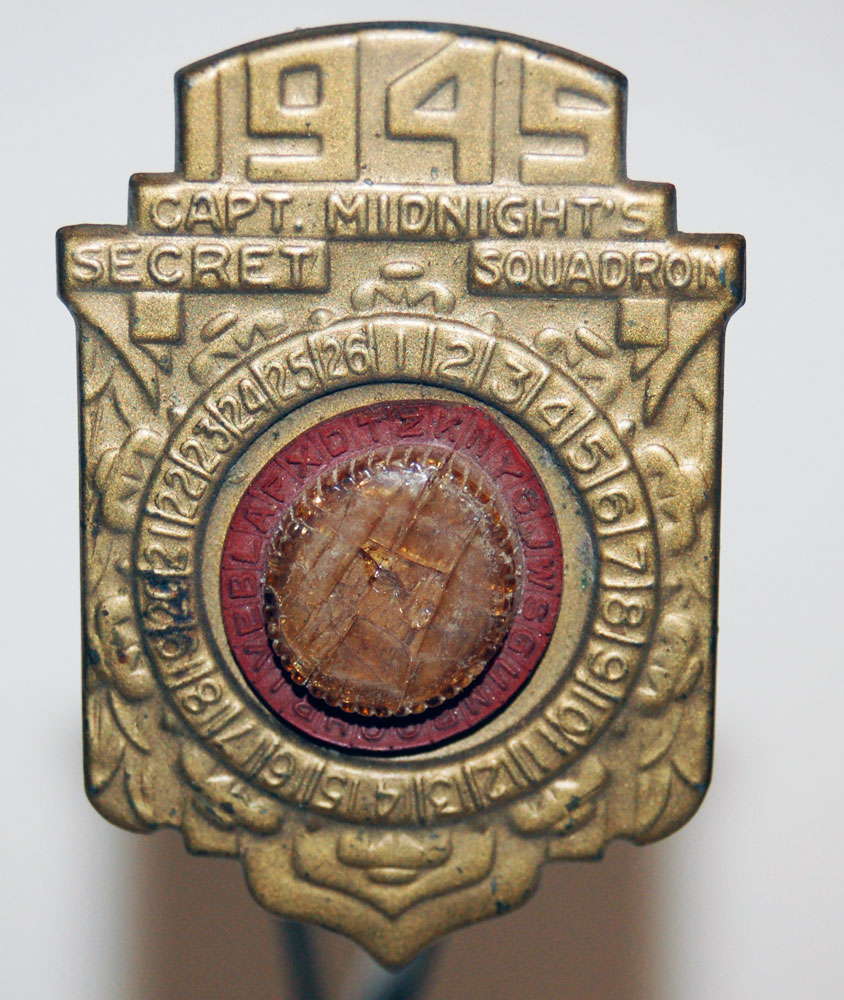
Capt. Midnight Decoder Badge

During the time that radio programs were the dominant medium in the United States, some programs advertised "souvenirs" of the various shows, which were sometimes called radio premiums. The first of these were generally cast photographs and the like, but eventually, these evolved into novelties that many children collected.

By the 1930s, a wide range of novelties appeared as premiums, most obtained by sending the sponsor's agency a proof of purchase, such as a boxtop or jar's inner seal, and frequently a small amount of cash, such as a dime. One amusing address was for Chief Lone Wolf who was strangely on the 14th floor of the Wrigley Building in Chicago.

Many "one size fits all" accessories were multifunctional, having a feature beyond just being jewelry. Quite a few had "secret compartments," and others had built-in siren whistles. Some rings were composed in whole or in part of luminous materials. A premium from Jack Armstrong, the All-American Boy program, offered in 1940, was a ring called the Dragon's Eye Ring, with images of crocodiles supporting a greenish "stone" made of Tenite. The molds for the ring were later used for two other premiums, one for Buck Rogers in the Twenty-Fifth Century, issued in 1947. The new ring was called the Buck Rogers Ring of Saturn, and had a red "stone" rather than the green one in the original. About the same time, a third ring, but with a black stone, was issued by Carey Salt for their sponsorship of The Shadow (another sponsor, Blue Coal, offered an entirely different luminous-plastic ring). Some rings had a hidden mirror for a "look behind" feature. Programs that offered such Look-Around rings included Tom Mix Ralston Straight Shooters, Captain Midnight, and The Lone Ranger. Other rings had spinners, photo viewers, ballpoint pens, magnifiers, signal blinkers, flashlights, etc.

Besides rings, there were many pocket items, including sundial "watches," compass-and-magnifiers, pedometers, truth detectors, and signaling devices. Premiums demanding many boxtops included cowboy outfits, a set of cooking equipment for camping, and special badges such as "Chief Inspector", "General", etc. A genre of cryptological radio premiums included "secret decoder rings", "decoder pins," or "decoder badges", mostly based on cipher disks. Brand sponsor Ovaltine issued decoders for Little Orphan Annie and Captain Midnight : secret messages were broadcast at the close of an episode, each invariably a preview of the forthcoming episode. Secret messages could be deciphered with one of the decoder premiums, as notably spoofed in the 1983 comedy A Christmas Story.

During World War II, restrictions were placed on manufacturing materials, notably copper and brass. As a result, virtually all premiums manufactured during the war were made of "noncritical" materials, such as wood, paper (including cardboard and card stock), and cloth. Some items made of luminous material were made into items to help in blackouts. At least one show offered a "Plane Spotter" premium, showing silhouettes of various types of allied and enemy aircraft, like those used by Office of Civilian Defense personnel.

Radio premiums got more multifunctional over the years, and by 1950, some of them had as many as four separate features. The Sky King radio program had several of the most innovative premiums. But by that time, the radio shows were phasing out because of the increasing influence of television.

In September 2006, Bill McMahon offered a presentation entitled "Old Time Radio Premiums" explaining in detail why premiums were offered and constructed. The presentation was among the events held at the annual Mid-Atlantic Nostalgia Convention in Aberdeen, Maryland.

== See also ==
- Boxtop – Upper Portion of a product box used as proof of purchase
