= King Faisal Air Base =

King Faisal Air Base may refer to:

- King Faisal Air Base (Jordan), a military installation of the Royal Jordanian Air Force near Al-Jafr, Jordan
- King Faisal Air Base (Saudi Arabia), a military installation of the Royal Saudi Air Force in Tabuk, Saudi Arabia

== See also ==
- King Faisal Naval Base, a military installation of the Royal Saudi Navy in Jeddah, Saudi Arabia
