= King Faisal Air Base (Jordan) =

Air base in Jordan

King Faisal Air Base
- مجموعة الملك فيصل بن عبد العزيز الجوية
- Near Al-Jafr, Ma'an Governorate in Jordan
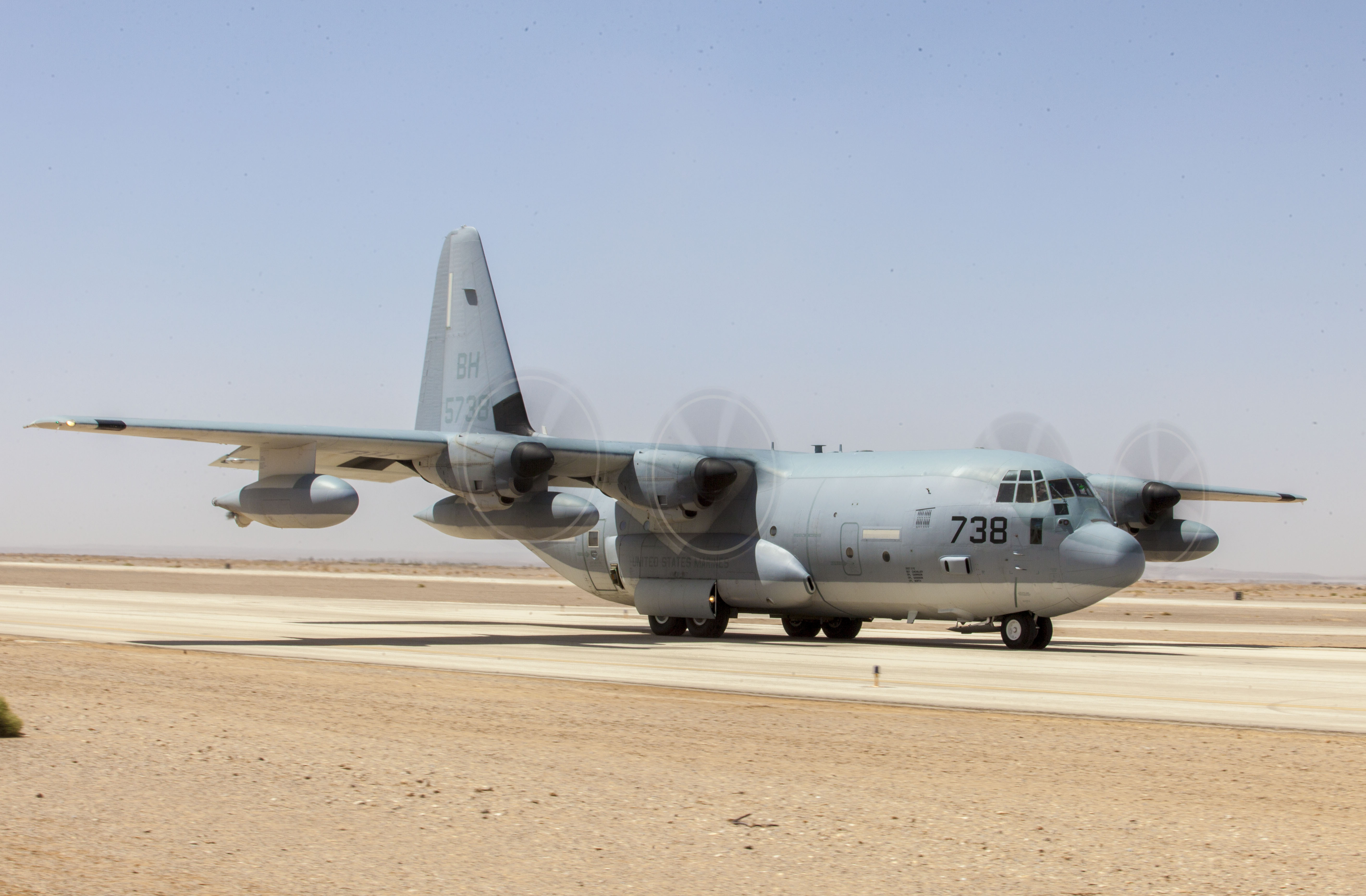
- A U.S. Marine Corps KC-130J Hercules takes off from King Faisal Air Base during Exercise Eager Lion, June 2013

Site information
- Type: Air Base
- Operator: Royal Jordanian Air Force
- Website: King Faisal Air Base

Location
- Shown within Jordan
- Coordinates: 30°20.589′N 036°08.856′E

Site history
- Built: 1974–1981
- In use: 1981–present

Airfield information
- Identifiers: ICAO: OJKF
- Elevation: 873 metres (2,864 ft) AMSL
Runways
Direction	Length and surface
11/29	3,600 metres (11,811 ft) Paved
- Sources: AIP Jordan, TPC H-5B

King Faisal Air Base (ICAO: OJKF; Arabic: مجموعة الملك فيصل بن عبد العزيز الجوية) is a Royal Jordanian Air Force (RJAF) installation near the town of Al-Jafr, Ma'an Governorate.

== Name ==
The installation is named for King Faisal of Saudi Arabia, who financed the base's construction.

== History ==
Construction for the base began in 1974, with the first aircraft landing on 27 November 1980. The base was officially opened by King Hussein of Jordan on 24 June 1981.

A 1983 report indicated that the base was used to assemble parts of Chinese Shenyang J-6 fighter aircraft for subsequent delivery to Iraq.

In 1987, Syrian president Hafez al-Assad and Iraqi president Saddam Hussein flew to the base to have a meeting in the nearby town Al-Jafr amidst the Iran–Iraq War.

In October 1996, the airfield was used by an Antonov An-124 to fly in the ThrustSSC jet car for testing in the desert near Al-Jafr.

On 4 November 2016, a Jordanian guard shot and killed three American soldiers and wounded another while they were returning to the base. The 39-year-old Jordanian assailant was sentenced to life in prison for the murders.

In July 2026, five American troops were injured in an Iranian strike on the base.

== Exercises ==
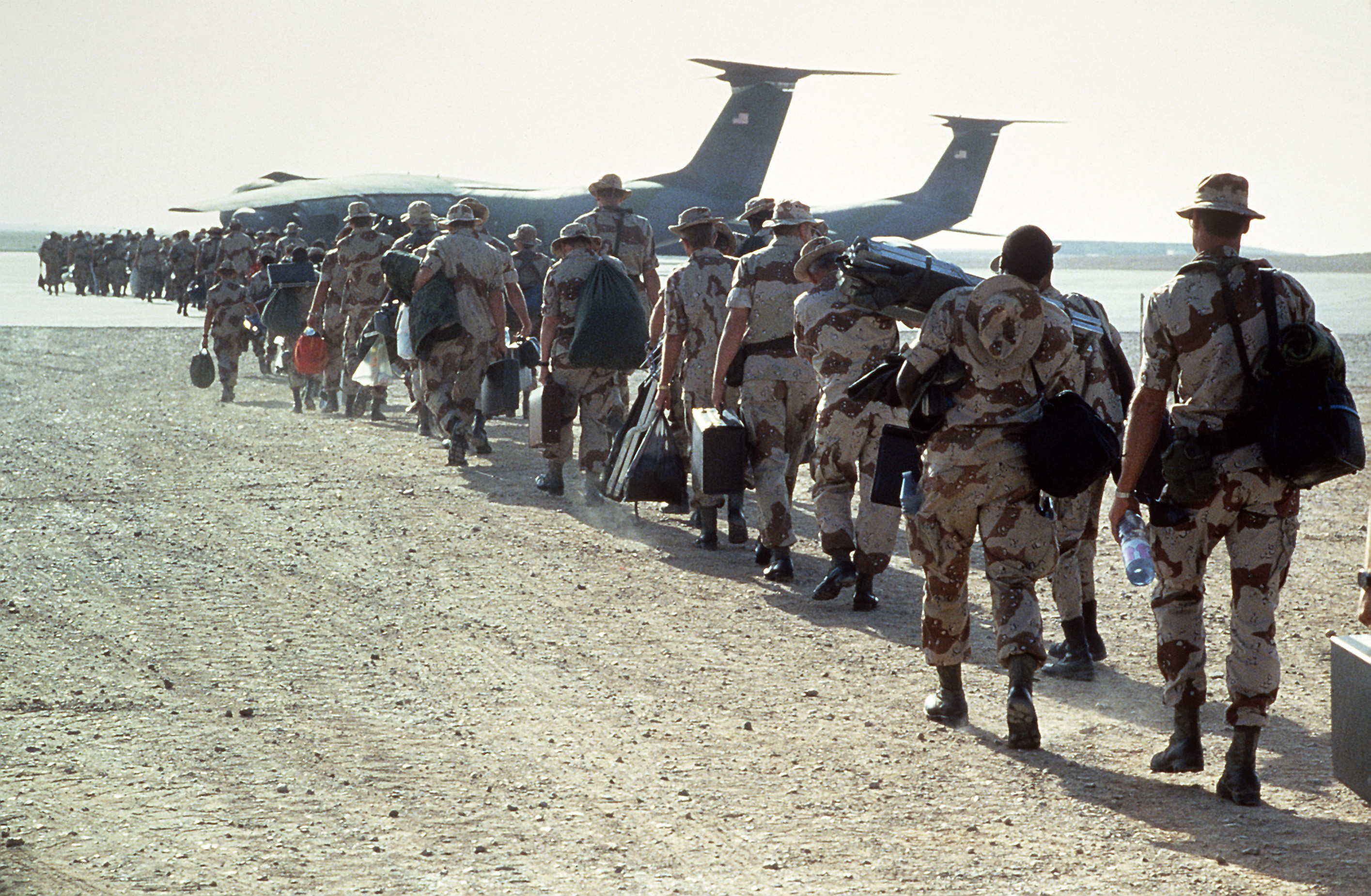
U.S. troops board a C-141 Starlifter during Exercise Bright Star '87 at the base.

The base frequently hosts military exercises, a practice going back as far as the 1980s. Among the exercises that have been hosted at the base are Exercise Bright Star and Exercise Eager Lion.
