= 2019 Naval Air Station Pensacola shooting =

Mass shooting in Florida, U.S.

Naval Air Station Pensacola shooting
- Part of Terrorism in the United States and the war on terror
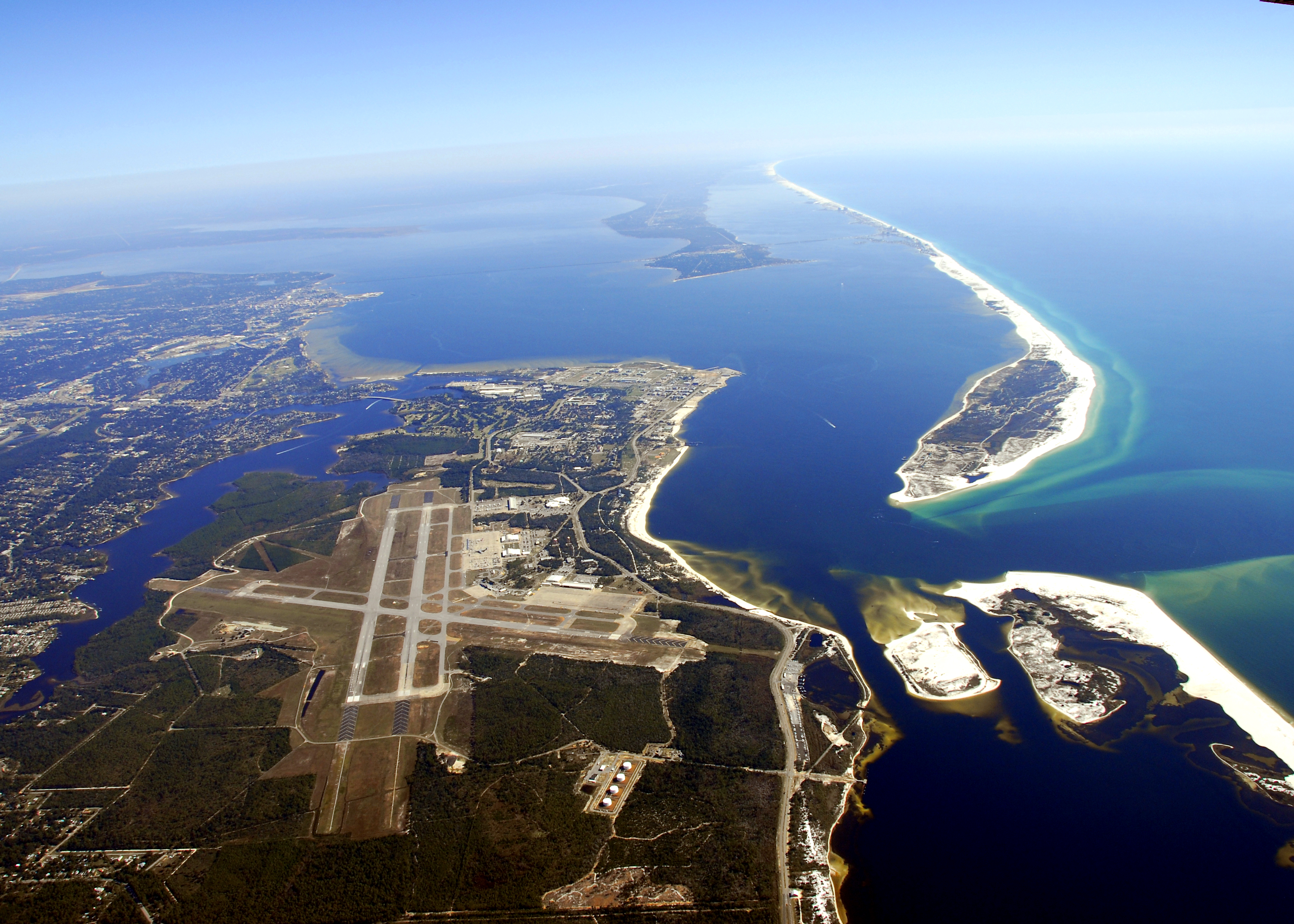
- Naval Air Station Pensacola

- Naval Air Station Pensacola (Florida) Naval Air Station Pensacola (the United States)
- Location: 30°20′57.1″N 87°16′28.3″W; Naval Air Station Pensacola, Florida, United States
- Date: December 6, 2019; 6 years ago 6:51 – 7:45 a.m. (EST; UTC−05:00)
- Weapon: Glock 45 9mm handgun
- Deaths: 4 (including the perpetrator)
- Injuries: 8
- Perpetrator: Al-Qaeda in the Arabian Peninsula
- Assailant: Mohammed Saeed Alshamrani
- Motive: Islamic extremism

On the morning of December 6, 2019, a terrorist attack occurred at Naval Air Station Pensacola in Pensacola, Florida. The assailant killed three men and injured eight others. The shooter was killed by Escambia County sheriff deputies after they arrived at the scene. He was identified as Mohammed Saeed Alshamrani, an Air Force aviation student from Saudi Arabia.

The FBI investigated the case as a presumed terrorism incident, while searching for the motive behind the attack. On January 13, 2020, the Department of Justice said they had officially classified the incident as an act of terrorism, motivated by "jihadist ideology."

On February 2, 2020, al-Qaeda in the Arabian Peninsula claimed responsibility for the shooting. In an audio recording, the leader of the Yemen-based group Qasim al-Raymi said they directed Alshamrani to carry out the attack. On May 18, 2020, the FBI corroborated the claims.

== Background ==
Alshamrani, a second lieutenant in the Royal Saudi Air Force, was participating in a training program sponsored by the Pentagon as part of a security cooperation agreement with Saudi Arabia. A United States Department of Defense official said more than 850 Saudi nationals are in the U.S. participating in the training program, which includes English, basic aviation, and initial pilot training.

Saudi Arabia is one of many countries allied to the United States that send members of their military to the naval station for training. At the time of the shooting, the program hosted 5,180 students from 153 countries, including the perpetrator.

== Shooting ==
Prior to the attack, at 6:39 a.m. a message on Twitter was posted by a user using the handle @M7MD_SHAMRANI, which declared hate for Americans due to its support of Israel.

The shooting began at 6:43 a.m. and was first reported at 6:51 a.m. when the suspect, armed with a 9mm Glock handgun and several extra magazines, opened fire in one of the classroom buildings. During the incident he moved through two floors of the building, discharging his weapon on both. One of the victims was able to make his way away from the scene to alert the first response team of the location of the shooter amongst other details. The suspect was shot and killed at 6:58 a.m. after two deputies from the Escambia County Sheriff's Office and members of the base security force exchanged gunfire with him.

The outside of the building was videotaped by another Saudi Arabian student while the shooting was occurring, as two additional Saudi Arabian students watched the shooting from a car. The student who was filming, and the other two students, had attended a dinner party hosted by the perpetrator prior to the attack.

== Victims ==
The shooter killed three U.S. Navy sailors, and injured eight others who were taken to the hospital, including three of the responding police officers who sustained gunshots to their limbs. Of the deceased, two were declared dead at the navy base and the third, who was able to get to authorities and give them a description of the shooter, died at the hospital.

The three victims were 19-year-old Airman Mohammed Sameh Haitham from St. Petersburg, Florida; 23-year-old recent United States Naval Academy graduate Ensign Joshua Kaleb Watson from Enterprise, Alabama; and 21-year-old Airman Apprentice Cameron Scott Walters from Richmond Hill, Georgia.

== Perpetrator ==
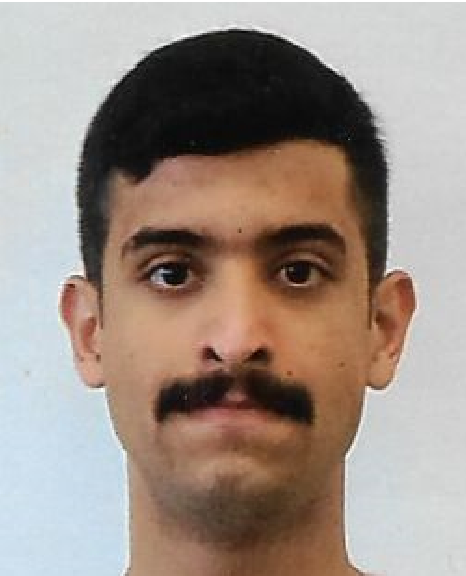
Photo of Mohammed Saeed Alshamrani issued by the FBI

The FBI identified the gunman as Mohammed Saeed Alshamrani, 21, a second lieutenant in the Royal Saudi Air Force, and said he was the sole shooter. He was participating in aviation training at the station. His training with the program began in August 2017 and was scheduled to conclude in August 2020, and included initial pilot training, basic aviation, and English-language instruction.

SITE Intelligence Group said that someone who may have been Alshamrani posted a justification of the planned attack on Twitter before the shooting. The post referred to U.S. wars in Muslim countries, wrote of his hatred for the American people, criticized the U.S. government's support of Israel, and quoted Osama bin Laden and Anwar al-Awlaki.

Prior to the shooting, Alshamrani had hosted a dinner party at which he and three other Saudi Arabian students had watched videos of other U.S. mass shootings.

== Aftermath ==
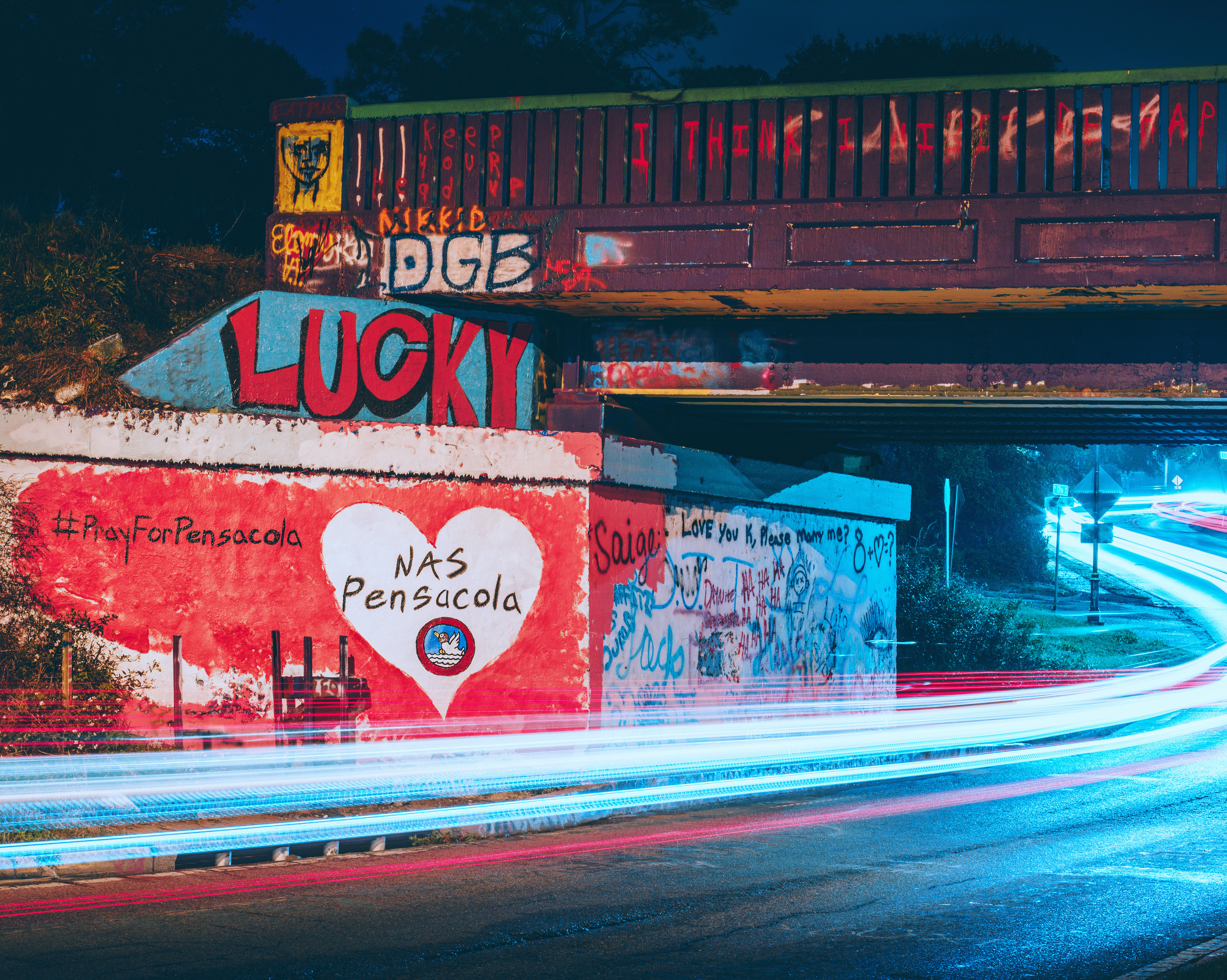
Mural on 17th Avenue bridge painted by a resident of Pensacola

Due to the attack, the national anthem was not played on the loudspeakers of the base at 8:00 a.m., as was otherwise customary. The store Wings & Things Monogramming and its parking lot was used as a congregation area for many military members who were not able to enter the locked-down base.

A mural was started by a local artist at the local Graffiti Bridge to honor the victims and survivors.

During a vigil held for the victims of the attack, Chief Deputy Sheriff Chip Simmons spoke to ABC News about the events, saying the closer he got to the naval base, "the more gunshots I heard over the police radio."

== Investigation ==
All foreign students on the base were accounted for and no arrests were made; students from Saudi Arabia were ordered by their Saudi Arabian commanding officer to remain on the base. The FBI agent leading the investigation said that all of the Saudi Arabian students were cooperating with the investigation.

The Federal Bureau of Investigation (FBI) opened an investigation into the perpetrator's social media. Investigators looked for any signs of radicalization in the perpetrator's upbringing, and whether the attack was an act of terror. Officials reported that the perpetrator had obtained a hunting license which allows for non-immigrants on a non-immigrant visa to purchase a gun. He then legally purchased a weapon from a gun store earlier in the year.

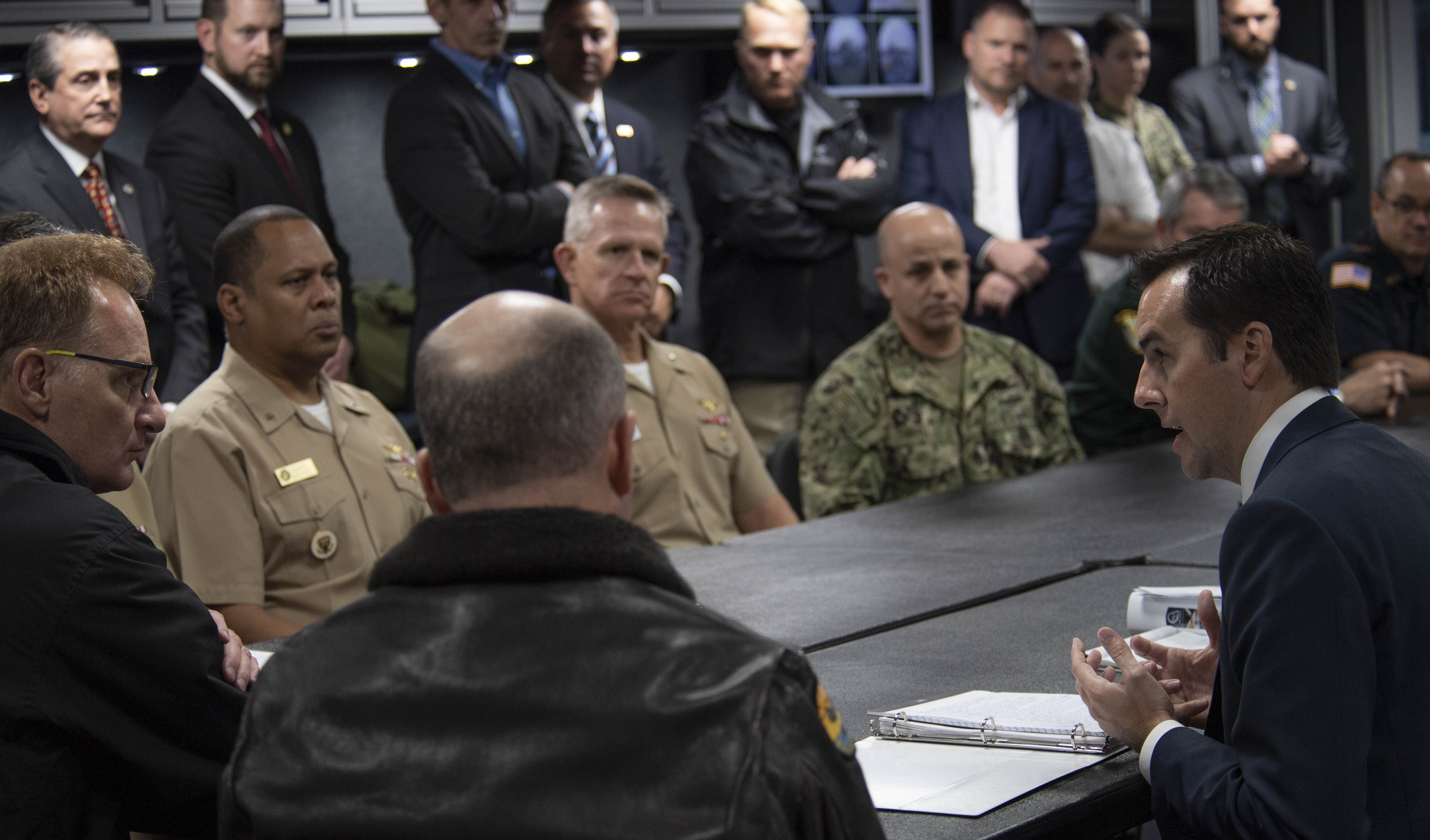
A brief by the FBI on the shooting in Pensacola

On December 8, the FBI said it was treating the shooting as a presumed terrorist attack. The Navy suspended flight training for all Saudi Arabian military aviation students pending the results of the FBI investigation; they will continue to get classroom instruction. Flight training was resumed for all other international students.

On December 11, a Saudi Arabian government analysis revealed that the shooter appears to have embraced radical ideology as early as 2015. A Twitter account believed to have been used by al-Shamrani, indicates that four religious figures described as radical appear to have shaped his extremist thoughts. The account also expressed support for radical Islam and terrorism, sectarianism, support for the Taliban, and hatred for the West.

Following a review of all Royal Saudi Air Force personnel conducting joint training in the US following the attack, investigators found 17 of the Saudi trainees in Florida had social media containing jihadi or anti-American content, and 15 (including some of the 17) had some form of child pornography in their possession.

Another investigation was opened by Defense Secretary Mark Esper into the vetting measures that go into accepting foreign nationals into the United States to train with the military.

On January 12, 2020, Attorney General William Barr declared the Pensacola shooting an "act of terrorism" that was motivated by "jihadist ideology". On May 18, 2020, Barr announced the FBI had managed to unlock the shooter's iPhone without Apple's help.

== Responses ==
=== Domestic ===
Matt Gaetz, the U.S. representative for Florida's 1st congressional district (which includes Pensacola), said, "I believe we can safely call this an act of terror, not an act of workplace violence." Florida senators Marco Rubio and Rick Scott called for thorough investigations of military training programs for foreign nationals on U.S. soil, and possible flaws in the trainee vetting processes.

On 18 October 2021, the Escambia County Sheriff's Office released a video on their Facebook page of their response to the shooting.

Governor Ron DeSantis placed a large amount of blame and need for compensation on the Saudi Arabian government, saying, "They [Saudi Arabia] are going to owe a debt here given that this is one of their individuals."

=== Saudi Arabia ===
The Saudi Arabian Ministry of Foreign Affairs expressed "its deep distress" after the incident and offered "its sincere condolences to the victims' families, and wishes the injured a speedy recovery" through a statement.

The king of Saudi Arabia, Salman bin Abdulaziz Al Saud, called President Donald Trump who posted about the call on December 6, through Twitter. Trump said the king had expressed his "sincere condolences" to those involved. Trump further elaborated that the king had said that the Saudi Arabian people were angered by the attack and that the perpetrator "in no way shape or form represents the feelings of the Saudi people who love the American people."

== See also ==
- List of mass shootings in the United States in 2019
- 2009 Fort Hood shooting, another terrorist mass shooting at US military base
- Washington Navy Yard shooting
- King Faisal Air Base shooting
