= King Faisal Air Base shooting =

2016 fragging incident in Jordan

- Location: 30°20′19″N 36°08′12″E; King Faisal Air Base near Al-Jafr, Jordan
- Date: November 4, 2016; 12 p.m.
- Attack type: Mass shooting
- Weapon: M16 rifle
- Deaths: 3
- Injuries: 1 (the perpetrator)
- Perpetrator: Corporal Marik al-Tuwayha
- Charges: Murder and intent to kill.
- Convicted: Sentenced to life in prison with hard labor.

The King Faisal Airbase shooting was a fragging incident that occurred on 4 November 2016 at King Faisal Air Base, a Jordanian air force installation near Al-Jafr, when three U.S. Army Special Forces trainers from 5th SFG who were stationed at the base were deliberately killed by a Jordanian soldier who was guarding the base's entrance. The American soldiers had been returning from a training exercise in a convoy when they were fired upon by First Sergeant Marik al-Tuwayha at a vehicle checkpoint resulting in a shootout.

The incident marked the second time in less than a year that American trainers had been killed in Jordan and caused a dispute between the governments of the United States and Jordan while also raising questions of what role U.S. soldiers were playing in Jordan. The Jordanian government formally charged al-Tuwayha with murder and intent to kill, provoking anger from certain elements of Jordan's population, including the influential Howeitat tribe. After a month-long trial, al-Tuwayha was sentenced to life in prison with hard labor in July 2017.

== Background ==
The United States and Jordan have maintained a strong military relationship since 1957 when the U.S. first began sending military aid to Jordan. In fiscal year 2013 the United States sent nearly $1.4 billion of aid to Jordan. In 1996, the United States bestowed Jordan with Major non-NATO Ally (MNNA) status, a designation that, among other things, makes Jordan eligible to receive excess U.S. defense articles, training, and loans of equipment for cooperative research and development. Beginning in 2013, Jordan has also become a popular locale for U.S. training of groups such as Iraqi government troops and moderate Syrian rebels as part of the Syrian Train and Equip Program.

The Syrian Train and Equip Program's roots in Jordan begin in 2013 when the first U.S. special forces trainers arrived in the country to train the program's first recruits. STEP was a CIA ran program and as such U.S. troops participating in it were "detailed" to the CIA in accordance with international law. Jordanian military bases are most often used in the training of selected fighters. One of these bases included King Faisal Air Base, located on the outskirts of Al-Jafr, Jordan, among other covert locations around Jordan.

== Action of November 4, 2016 ==
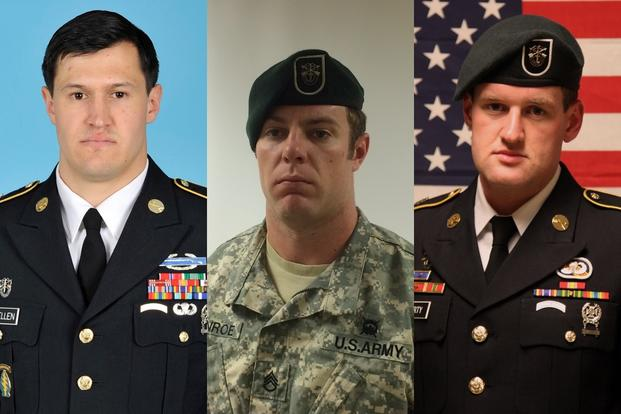
The three victims of the King Faisal Air Base shooting from left to right: SSG Matthew Lewellen, SSG Kevin McEnroe and SSG James Moriarty

Shortly after 12:00pm (ADT) on November 4, 2016, a convoy of four unarmored vehicles arrived at King Faisal air base. The convoy contained four American soldiers who were returning from a day of range training elsewhere. The first vehicle of the convoy passed through the base's sole access control point unimpeded. As the second vehicle approached to enter, a Jordanian army guard, Corporal Marik al-Tuwayha, opened fire with his M16 rifle, striking through the windshield of the vehicle and killing Staff Sergeant Kevin McEnroe and Staff Sergeant Matthew Lewellen. The other Americans in the following vehicles shouted in both English and Arabic to Corporal al-Tuwayha to cease fire to no avail. Corporal al-Tuwayha then advanced on the other Americans in the convoy, firing on them as he did so. The two remaining Americans sought cover and returned fire. Staff Sergeant James Moriarty was killed and the remaining American shot Corporal al-Tuwayha with his pistol, critically wounding him and ending the gunbattle.

The Americans in the convoy were not wearing body armor since it was not required to outside of some specified training which contributed to the devastating losses suffered in the shooting. Corporal al-Tuwayha was wearing body armor and was using a rifle while the Americans only had pistols for personal protection. Two of the Americans in the attack were medically evacuated but later died of their wounds. Corporal al-Tuwayha was severely injured and placed in an induced coma, he was taken to the same hospital and allowed in close proximity of them due to the lack of clarity surrounding the shooting.

== Investigation ==
Because of the lack of perceived threat and Jordan's status as an American ally, the US service members were traveling in unarmored vehicles, not wearing body armor and only carrying sidearms. The intelligence report on the incident recommends US forces in the future use armored vehicles and carry at least one rifle with them.

The Federal Bureau of Investigation (FBI) opened an investigation into the cause of the shooting. Initially, the Jordanian military attributed the cause of the shooting to a case of friendly fire and insisted the US convoy did not heed orders from the Jordanian guard to stop. The American investigation stated that the shooting appeared to be deliberate. The FBI has investigated the Jordanian guard for links to religious extremism and/or ISIS, though no links have been found. After reviewing video footage, the Jordanian military and King Abdullah II agreed that the US convoy complied with "established procedures at the base" and that the soldiers "did nothing to instigate the attack".

1st Sgt. Marik al-Tuwayha was charged with murder for the attack, and pleaded "not guilty".

== Trial and conviction ==
Al-Tuwayha was convicted of murder in a Jordanian military tribunal and sentenced to life in prison with hard labor. In Jordan, "life sentences" last for 20–30 years.

== See also ==
- 2015 Amman shooting attack
- Naval Air Station Pensacola shooting
