= Yacoub Zayadin =

Jordanian politician (1920–2015)

- Born: 1922; Samakeieh, Karak Governorate
- Died: 5 April 2015 (aged 94–95)
- Education: Degree in Medicine
- Alma mater: Beirut
- Occupations: Politician, Surgeon
- Political party: Jordanian Communist Party

Yacoub Zayadin (1920 – 5 April 2015) was a Jordanian politician and surgeon.

Zayadin was born in Samakeieh in the current Karak Governorate in 1920. He completed his secondary education in Salt and moved to Damascus to study law. He later dropped the study of law and pursued a degree in medicine in Beirut.

After completing his degree Zayadin moved to Jerusalem where he worked as a surgeon. He was elected to the Jordanian House of Representatives for a Christian seat for Jerusalem in 1956. He served as Secretary General of the Jordanian Communist Party. Between 1957 and 1965 Zayadin was imprisoned at Al Jafr prison, where he was tortured. He was finally released under a general amnesty. In 1989 he ran once more for a seat in the House of Representatives, this time in Amman, but he was not elected. After democratic reforms in Jordan he helped the Communisty Party get a license from the Ministry of Interior once again. In April 1993 he was once again re-elected as secretary general of the party. He served in this position until the late 1990s. In 2001 he left the party after a disagreement and joined a splinter movement.

Zayadin died on 5 April 2015, aged 95. Several political commentators described Zayadin as driver for change while also considering him to patriotic.
