= Crossley ratings =

The Crossley ratings (or Crossleys) were an audience measurement system created to determine the audience size of radio broadcasts beginning in 1930. Developed by Archibald Crossley, the ratings were generated using information collected by telephone surveys to random homes.

In 1930, Crossley spearheaded the formation of the Cooperative Analysis of Broadcasting (CAB). The first national ratings service, CAB was supported by subscription and was at first available only to advertisers. Crossley's method of data collection essentially consisted of calling random households in selected cities and asking the respondent to recall what radio programs had been listened to at an earlier point: the previous day in Crossley's first surveys, later modified to a few hours earlier. The survey also divided the day into four listening periods (later known as dayparts), thus uncovering the fact that most radio listening at the time occurred in the evenings. In the industry, the method was known as "telephone recall" and the reports were called the "Crossley ratings" or simply the "Crossleys". The survey is alluded to during Orson Welles' opening narration for his famous 1938 radio dramatization of The War of the Worlds: "On this particular evening, October 30th, the Crossley service estimated that thirty-two million people were listening in on radios."

In the mid-1930s a competing telephone survey method was developed, generally believed to be an improvement on the Crossley method. This method, described as "telephone coincidental", asked respondents what was being listened to at that moment. It was employed by C.E. Hooper, and the results became known as "Hooperatings". Although CAB eventually adopted the coincidental method, Hooperatings soon surpassed Crossley ratings in industry importance and by 1946 CAB was dissolved.

== See also ==
- Arbitron
- Nielsen ratings
