= The Night America Trembled =

- Westinghouse Studio One episode
- Episode no.: Season 10; Episode 1
- Directed by: Tom Donovan
- Written by: Nelson S. Bond
- Original air date: September 9, 1957
- Running time: 60 minutes

Episode chronology
← Previous "The Weston Strain"	Next → "First Prize for Murder"

"The Night America Trembled" is a television dramatization of the public reaction to the 1938 radio broadcast of "The War of the Worlds" that aired September 9, 1957, as an episode of the CBS series Westinghouse Studio One. Hosted by Edward R. Murrow, the live documentary play was written by Nelson S. Bond, and uses excerpts of the radio script by Howard E. Koch.

== Background ==
The film centers on the panic created when The Mercury Theater on the Air presented a radio adaptation of an 1898 H. G. Wells science fiction novel, The War of the Worlds. In spite of many pre-broadcast promotions describing the play, and several statements during the program itself, the 1938 broadcast, which featured simulated news reports, was taken seriously by a number of listeners, who thought an actual Martian invasion of Earth was taking place, and reacted in a doomsday fashion.

After the 1938 broadcast, some people were critical of Orson Welles for making the broadcast so realistic that some people thought it reflected actual events, but Welles maintained that radio melodrama was supposed to be realistic, over-the-top. Welles said in a press conference the day following the broadcast that he anticipated it would generate reactions similar those when the radio series presented "Dracula". He thought the 19th-century story was so old that he might have trouble keeping the audience interested, and never thought anyone would think there was an actual Martian invasion going on.

== Plot summary ==
"The Night America Trembled" intersperses portrayals of the in-studio radio cast doing the show with the panicked reactions of members of the listening public. A babysitter listens to the broadcast and places an emergency call to the baby's parents, who are dining at a country club. The New Jersey State Police are bombarded by telephone calls from a frightened citizenry. A young couple out on a date hears the program while parked in "Lover's Lane" and rush home, much to the amusement of the girl's parents, who had been listening to The Chase and Sanborn Hour on NBC starring Edgar Bergen and Charlie McCarthy, where there were no reports of Martians, and chuckled at the young couple's naiveté.

== Cast ==
The Westinghouse show's cast featured Alexander Scourby and Ed Asner (credited as Edward Asner) as members of the radio studio cast, as well as Vincent Gardenia as a barroom patron engaging in conversations about Hitler. Warren Oates and Warren Beatty also appeared in early-career television roles as poker-playing college students. James Coburn (credited as Jim Coburn) portraying a young father, appeared in his television debut, and John Astin also appeared, uncredited, as a newspaper reporter.

- Edward R. Murrow as himself
- Alexander Scourby as Host
- Robert Blackburn as Director
- Casey Allen as 1st Announcer
- Norman Rose as 2nd Announcer
- Ray Boyle as 1st Actor
- Frank Marth as 2nd Actor
- Edward Asner as 3rd Actor
- Freda Holloway as Mary
- John Gibson as Mary's Father
- Clint Kimbrough as Bob
- Tom Clancy as Tom
- Vincent Gardenia as Dick
- Fred J. Scollay as Harry
- James (as Jim) Coburn as Sam
- Priscilla Gillette as Elaine
- Susan Hallaran as Millie
- Crahan Denton as Mac
- Al Markim as Brownie
- Frank Daly as Editor
- Roger Quinlan as Timid Man
- Larry Robinson as Dealer
- Warren Beatty as 1st Card Player
- Warren Oates as 2nd Card Player
- Fritz Weber as 3rd Card Player
- Rob Kilgallen as Student
- John Astin as Whitaker (uncredited)

None of the Mercury Theatre members involved with original 1938 broadcast is mentioned by name in "The Night America Trembled". Orson Welles's lines from that night were split up among a few different people, including one of the announcers, and the only person to break the "fourth wall" and speak to the audience was host and veteran CBS news reporter Edward R. Murrow. The character of Princeton astronomer Richard Pearson that Welles had portrayed, and around whom the entire second half of the original broadcast revolved, had completely disappeared from the Westinghouse Studio One presentation. Welles was involved in a lawsuit against CBS after the broadcast, about the authorship of the radio play. The courts ruled against Welles, who was found to have abandoned any rights to the script for "The War of the Worlds" after it was published in Hadley Cantril's 1940 book, The Invasion from Mars: A Study in the Psychology of Panic, in which Howard E. Koch is listed as sole author. Koch subsequently copyrighted the script of the radio play and had granted CBS the right to use it in its program.

A few decades later, a very similar story was encapsulated in a made-for-TV film called The Night that Panicked America. It starred Paul Shenar as Orson Welles; other cast members included Vic Morrow, Michael Constantine, Eileen Brennan, Tom Bosley, John Ritter, and Meredith Baxter. It was originally broadcast on October 31, 1975 by ABC.
