= The Night That Panicked America =

- DVD cover
- Genre: Drama
- Screenplay by: Nicholas Meyer; Anthony Wilson
- Story by: Nicholas Meyer
- Directed by: Joseph Sargent
- Starring: Vic Morrow; Meredith Baxter; Tom Bosley; Will Geer
- Music by: Frank Comstock
- Country of origin: United States
- Original language: English

Production
- Executive producer: Anthony Wilson
- Producer: Joseph Sargent
- Production location: Los Angeles
- Cinematography: Jules Brenner
- Editors: Bud S. Isaacs; George Jay Nicholson; Tony Radecki
- Running time: 92 minutes
- Production companies: The Culzean Corporation; Paramount Television

Original release
- Network: ABC
- Release: October 31, 1975

The Night That Panicked America is an American made-for-television drama film that was originally broadcast on the ABC network on October 31, 1975. The telefilm dramatizes events surrounding Orson Welles' famous — and infamous – War of the Worlds radio broadcast (based on the 1898 novel of the same name by English author H. G. Wells) of October 30, 1938, which had led some Americans to believe that an invasion by Martians was occurring in the area near Grover's Mill in West Windsor, New Jersey.

The Welles broadcast and the reaction to it had been earlier dramatized on television as The Night America Trembled, a live presentation that aired September 9, 1957, on Studio One.

== Plot ==
The Night That Panicked America tells the story of the 1938 The War of the Worlds broadcast from the point of view of Orson Welles and his associates as they create the broadcast live, as well as from the points of view of a number of different fictional American families, in a variety of locations and from a variety of social classes, who listened to the broadcast and believed the imaginary Martian invasion was actually occurring.

- In Grover's Mill, New Jersey, father and son farmers Jess and Walter Wingate argue over Walter's desire to join the Canadian army to fight Adolf Hitler's forces, Jess feeling it is not America's problem. When Jess hears the broadcast, believing the attack real, he urges Walter to take shotguns and confront the Martians. Walter joins him despite his doubts, especially since other stations are not covering this event. At one point, Jess shoots at another neighboring farmer's water tower thinking it to be one of the tripodal machines described in the play. When they learn the truth, Walter suggests that Germany could bring similar havoc, and reiterates his intent to go fight;
- In Newark, New Jersey, depressed businessman Hank Muldoon, intent on leaving his wife Ann and their children, hears the story's depiction of Martian attacks taking place nearby in Grover's Mill, and has a change of heart, gathering all of them, along with an elderly neighbor, to hastily drive away in the hopes of finding safer territory in New York City. Among the valuables he quickly packs up is a gun. Upon reaching a deserted Lincoln Tunnel, and seeing bright red lights approaching, thinking that the end is near, Hank and Ann consider shooting the children and themselves to spare them the imagined horrors to come. However, the red lights belong to a police car, and Hank relents. The family return home to hear news reports about the panicked reactions to the program, and Hank and Ann appear to reconcile;
- In Oak Park, Illinois, Protestant minister Reverend Davis, who has objected to his daughter Linda marrying her Catholic boyfriend Stefan Grubowski, hears the description of carnage on the radio, and has a crisis of faith, breaking down and almost vandalizing his own church before Linda and Stefan can calm him down. He agrees to marry them himself, and shortly afterward they learn the event is a fiction;
- In Nob Hill, a wealthy enclave of San Francisco, the Matlock family host a dinner party full of similarly rich friends, all of them being anti-interventionists believing that Hitler should be appeased, a stance their butler Harrison and maid silently resent. Stumbling across the broadcast due to its pretense of presenting ballroom dance music, the Matlocks and company are taken in by the depictions of chaos; when their domestics, aware this is only a play, try to explain, they are ignored by their employer. As the affluent people are driven to start trying to carry away their most valuable possessions and find shelter, Harrison mocks them, throwing their own talking points at them and suggesting that "perhaps the Martians will be open to appeasement";
- In an undisclosed small town, Tex, an affable bar patron, has been ignoring the radio to play coin-op games and woo an attractive woman. When the rest of the people at the bar are swept up in their belief in the attack, Tex is convinced as well, and rashly steals a car to escape the impending arrival. He is quickly stopped by a police officer, and when he tries to warn him about the Martians, the officer is aware it is only a radio play, and takes him to the local lock-up for the night;

During the broadcast, CBS switchboard operators are increasingly overwhelmed by the amount of calls from listeners believing the alien attack is real. Soon police and press have infiltrated the building as well. Welles and his The Mercury Theatre on the Air producer Paul Stewart continue the show unabated, but agree to broadcast another disclaimer at the station break. However, by the time this announcement comes, most frightened listeners have abandoned their radios.

When the show is over, press swarm the studio besieging Welles with questions. The story protagonists, safely returning to their homes, hear news coverage of the national reaction to the program, including reports that some listeners were even about to commit suicide. Stewart leaves the CBS building, assuring a security guard the nightmare is over. Audio of future radio coverage of Hitler speeches fades in, suggesting that real-life horrors will soon be heard by American radio listeners.

== Cast ==
- Vic Morrow as Hank Muldoon
- Cliff DeYoung as Stefan Grubowski
- Michael Constantine as Jess Wingate
- Walter McGinn as Paul Stewart
- Eileen Brennan as Ann Muldoon
- Meredith Baxter as Linda Davis
- Will Geer as Reverend Davis
- Tom Bosley as Norman Smith
- Paul Shenar as Orson Welles
- John Ritter as Walter Wingate
- Granville Van Dusen as Carl Phillips
- Burton Gilliam as "Tex"
- Joshua Bryant as Howard Koch

In addition, Walker Edmiston, Casey Kasem, Ron Rifkin, Marcus J. Grapes, and Art Hannes, portray unnamed Mercury Theatre Players.

== Reception ==
The Encyclopedia of Science Fiction praised the film's recreation of events in the radio studio, but was unimpressed by its depiction of the resulting panic, calling it "a routine disaster movie with hackneyed characters reacting in predictable ways."

The movie received three Primetime Emmy Award nominations, including for Outstanding Writing and Outstanding Picture Editing, winning for Outstanding Achievement in Film Sound Editing – For a Single Episode of a Regular or Limited Series at the 28th Primetime Emmy Awards in 1976.

Through the 1980s, some local stations in various areas of the United States made an annual tradition of rebroadcasting Night on October 30 (the anniversary of the original radio broadcast) or on October 31 (Halloween).

== Home media ==
The film was released on DVD by CBS Home Entertainment on October 28, 2014.

== See also ==
- The War of the Worlds, 1898 novel by H. G. Wells
- List of American films of 1975
- The Night America Trembled - the earlier dramatization. The cast included Alexander Scourby, Ed Asner, and Warren Oates. James Coburn made his television debut, and, in one of his earliest acting roles, Warren Beatty appeared in the bit part of a card-playing college student.
