= Jafr alien invasion =

2010 Jordanian newspaper prank

The Jafr alien invasion was a prank published on the front page of the Jordanian newspaper Al-Ghad on 1 April 2010. The article claimed that UFOs had landed in a desert close to the town of Jafr, and described the pilots of the objects as "3m (10ft) creatures". The newspaper reported that all communications "went down" due to the effect generated by the objects.

The story described in great detail that the town had been lit by the aliens' flying saucers during their night landing, and that the light caused residents to run out into the streets. After word of the article spread throughout Jafr, many residents were terrified and kept their children home from school. Jafr Mayor Mohammed Mleihan notified security authorities and prepared to issue an evacuation order for the entire town of 13,000 residents. Mleihan noted that residents were "scared that aliens would attack them" and considered suing the newspaper for their "big lie".

The newspaper formally apologised for the inconvenience the stunt had caused. The newspaper's editor did not specify why Jafr was chosen as the target of the joke, but BBC coverage noted that the area was "notorious" for its military bases that were used by American soldiers during joint exercises with the Jordanian military, and which once housed alleged al-Qaida militants.

The prank drew comparisons to the 1938 radio broadcast of War of the Worlds which is widely thought to have provoked panic in the United States; however, the extent of the reaction to the War of the Worlds broadcast has been questioned by historians. While April Fools' Day jokes in newspapers are a common tradition in some countries, this was not the case in Jordan.

== See also ==
- "The War of the Worlds" (1938 radio drama)
