= Al Jafr prison =

Former Jordanian prison

Al Jafr prison was, until its closure in December 2006, one of the most notorious prisons in Jordan's penal system. It was built in 1953, 256 km south of Amman, the capital of Jordan. In the mid twentieth century it held members of leftist political parties. They were imprisoned in Al Jafr after being found guilty of planning or involvement in various attempted coups d'état. Al Jafr later housed common criminals, but remained a symbol of the turbulent 1950s and 1960s.

In 2006, The National Centre for Human Rights (NCHR) investigated prison conditions in all of Jordan's ten correctional facilities. It found conditions in Al Jafr to be abysmal in terms of the level of care and service provided to inmates. In a report released to the Jordanian public, the NCHR noted that the prison suffered from lack of oversight, unsanitary conditions, and lacked adequate medical, psychological, social, educational and sports and rehabilitation facilities. Its report also revealed regular occurrences of prison brutality. It recommended the closure of the prison.

On 17 December 2006, the kingdom's monarch, King Abdullah II, during a visit to the NCHR, ordered the prison closed and recommended that authorities rehabilitate the facility as a vocational training centre. Al Jafr Prison's 190 inmates were transferred to other facilities on 18 December 2006. An NCHR inspection of the grounds in March 2007 found the facility empty except for personnel guarding the facility.

The closure of Al Jafr is the most prominent achievement of Jordan's $34 million penal reform programme now underway. The plan targets an overhaul of existing prison infrastructure, the construction of new facilities to ease over-crowding and the institutionalization of correctional and rehabilitation programmes for inmates.

Jordan's 10 correctional facilities hold approximately 6,000 inmates.

== Notable detainees ==
- Yacoub Zayadin (held 1957–1965)
