= Al-Jafr, Jordan =

Al-Jafr الجفر
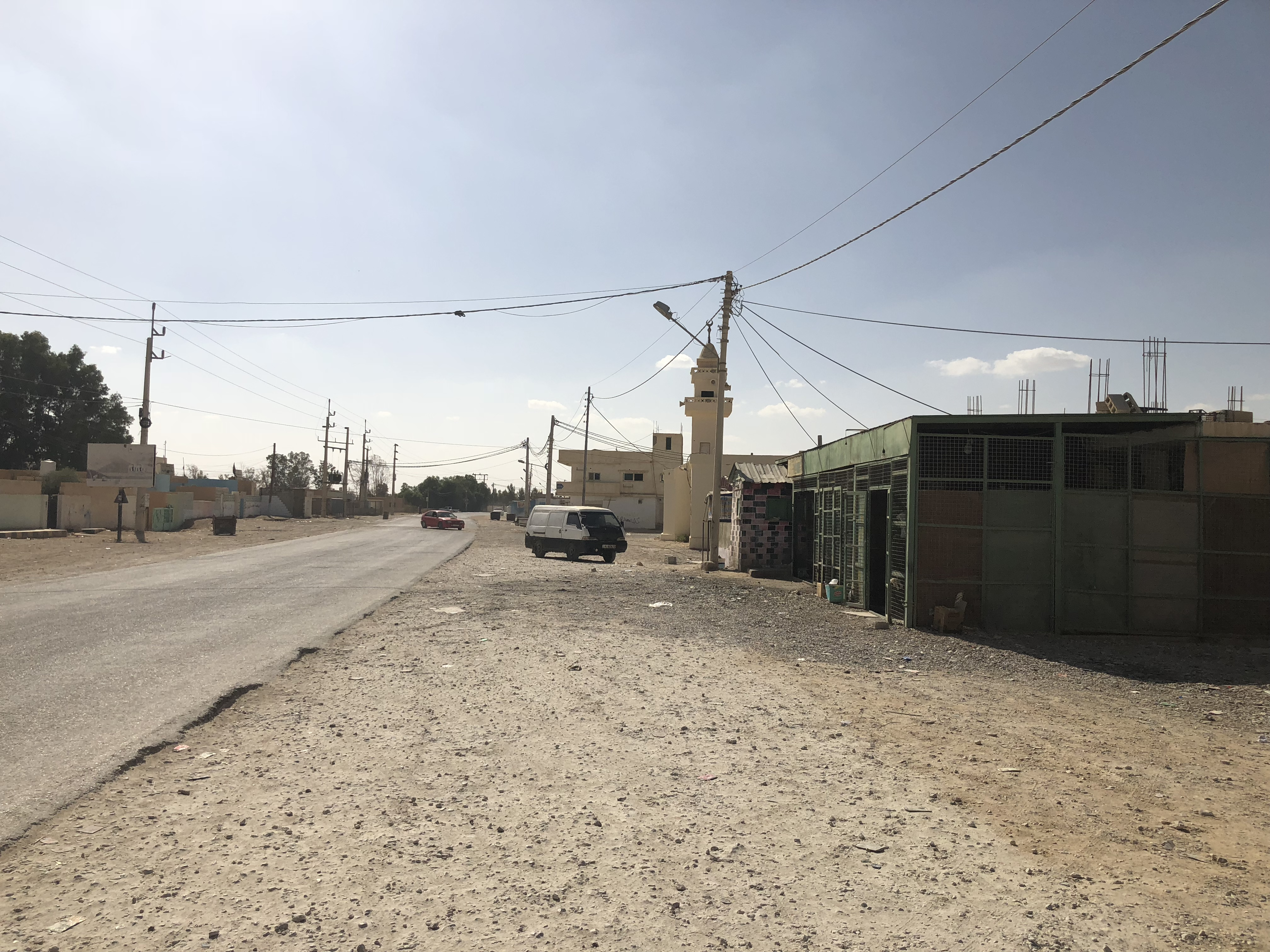

- Location in Jordan
- Coordinates: 30°17′36″N 36°12′50″E
- Country: Jordan
- Governorate: Ma'an Governorate

Government
  - Mayor: Mohammed Mleihan

Population (2015)
  - Total: 6,380
- Time zone: GMT +2
  - Summer (DST): +3

Al-Jafr (Arabic: الجفر) is a city in the Ma'an Governorate of Jordan. It is located near the city of Ma'an, and is roughly 300 kilometres (190 mi) east of Amman.

It was the site of an April Fools' Day hoax in 2010 that has drawn comparisons to the famous American The War of the Worlds broadcast. The nearby desert area has also been used for high speed performance tests by teams attempting to break the Land speed record.

== Climate ==
Climate data for Al-Jafr, elevation 865 m (2,838 ft)
Month	Jan	Feb	Mar	Apr	May	Jun	Jul	Aug	Sep	Oct	Nov	Dec	Year
Mean daily maximum °C (°F)	14.6 (58.3)	17.2 (63.0)	20.7 (69.3)	26.1 (79.0)	30.3 (86.5)	33.9 (93.0)	35.4 (95.7)	35.2 (95.4)	33.2 (91.8)	28.7 (83.7)	21.6 (70.9)	16.0 (60.8)	26.1 (79.0)
Daily mean °C (°F)	7.3 (45.1)	9.3 (48.7)	12.8 (55.0)	17.3 (63.1)	21.5 (70.7)	24.2 (75.6)	25.8 (78.4)	25.8 (78.4)	24.0 (75.2)	20.0 (68.0)	13.8 (56.8)	8.5 (47.3)	17.5 (63.5)
Mean daily minimum °C (°F)	−0.3 (31.5)	1.6 (34.9)	4.8 (40.6)	8.6 (47.5)	12.5 (54.5)	14.8 (58.6)	16.3 (61.3)	16.7 (62.1)	13.3 (55.9)	11.1 (52.0)	6.0 (42.8)	1.0 (33.8)	8.9 (48.0)
Average precipitation mm (inches)	6 (0.2)	6 (0.2)	7 (0.3)	3 (0.1)	2 (0.1)	0 (0)	0 (0)	0 (0)	0 (0)	2 (0.1)	9 (0.4)	1 (0.0)	36 (1.4)
Source: FAO

== See also ==
- Al Jafr prison
