= Escambia County Sheriff's Office (Florida) =

Law enforcement agency for Escambia County, Florida

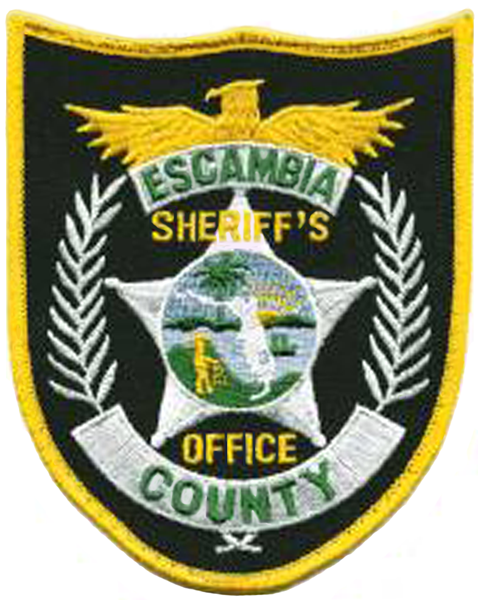
- Patch of the Escambia County Sheriff

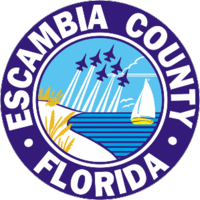
- Seal of Escambia County, Florida
- Abbreviation: ECSO
- Motto: To Serve and Protect

Agency overview
- Formed: 1845
- Employees: 650
- Annual budget: US$$60.30 million

Jurisdictional structure
- Operations jurisdiction: Escambia, Florida, USA
- Map of Escambia County Sheriff's Office's jurisdiction
- Area: 875 square miles (2,270 km^{2})
- Population: 500,000
- Legal jurisdiction: Escambia County, Florida
- Governing body: County Commission
- General nature: Local civilian police

Operational structure
- Headquarters: 1700 West Leonard Street, Pensacola, Florida 32501
- Deputy Sheriffs: 410
- Agency executives: Chip Simmons (R), Sheriff; Tommi Lyter (R), Chief Deputy; Andrew Hobbs, Chief Deputy
- Parent agency: Escambia County Board of County Commissioners (Florida)

Facilities
- Precincts: 6
- Police Boats: 3
- Helicopters: 0
- Planes: 0

Website
- Official Site

The Escambia County Sheriff's Office (ECSO) or Escambia Sheriff's Office (ESO) is the primary law enforcement agency of unincorporated Escambia County and the town of Century. ECSO is headed by a sheriff, who serves a four-year term and is elected in a partisan election. The current sheriff is Chip W. Simmons.

== Department Structure ==
The Escambia County Sheriff's Office is headed by a sheriff. Currently, the Sheriff is Chip W. Simmons who replaced former Sheriff David Morgan in 2021. Simmons was previously Chief of Police for the City of Pensacola, Florida, in Escambia County, Florida.

=== Chief Deputy ===
The rank of chief deputy is the second-highest rank in the Office, reporting directly to the Sheriff. Each chief deputy serves as a member of the senior command staff and assists the sheriff in managing civilian and commissioned personnel.

=== Precincts ===
- Central Booking Division: 1700 West Leonard Street, Pensacola (no longer functional as of May 1st ,2014)
- Pensacola Beach (1st Precinct) Substation: 43 Fort Pickens Road, Pensacola Beach
- Big Lagoon (2nd Precinct) Substation: 12950 Gulf Beach Highway, Pensacola
- South (Warrington) Pensacola (3rd Precinct) Substation: 20 North Navy Blvd., Pensacola
- North Pensacola (4th Precinct) Substation: 97 W. Hood Drive. Pensacola
- Cantonment/Molino (5th Precinct) Substation: 5844 North Hwy 29, Molino
- Century (6th Precinct) Substation: 7500 North Century Blvd., Century

== Line of duty deaths ==
According to ODMP, 12 officers and 2 K9s of the ECSO have been killed in the line of duty.

== Rank structure ==
Title	Insignia
Sheriff	
Chief Deputy	
Commander	
Colonel	
Major	
Captain	
Lieutenant	
Sergeant	
Deputy First Class	
Deputy	

Before October 2013, the sheriff had control over the Escambia County Jail, located at 2935 North L Street, but after a U.S. Department of Justice investigation reported that the jail did not provide required minimum services and was chronically understaffed, the jail was moved under the direct supervision of the County Commissioners. In April 2014 a natural gas explosion rocked the jail, causing some to reconsider the wisdom of direct Commission administration.

== History ==
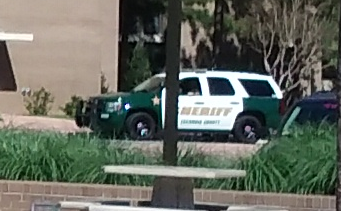
An Escambia County Sheriff Officer seen patrolling Pensacola Christian College's campus.

The office of sheriff was established with the transfer from Spain in 1821. The Spanish title Alguazil was initially used for the office. Henri Peire, a former privateer and colonel in the United States Army, was named the first sheriff by General Andrew Jackson.

On August 23, 1877, the notorious outlaw John Wesley Hardin was arrested by Sheriff William H. Hutchinson working with Texas Rangers Lt. John B. Armstrong and Jack R. Duncan, accompanied by nine deputies.

In the 21st century relations between the Escambia County Sheriff's Office and federal law enforcement were occasionally strained. In 2005 under Sheriff McNesby, disagreements over the release of information in drug cases led to a monthlong stand-off between the sheriff's office and the U.S. Attorney's office, which was only settled by the intervention of three federal judges. In September 2012, the Civil Rights Division completed its report on excessive use of force by the Escambia Sheriff's Office, that together with the Department of Justice's 2013 report on the inadequate status of the Escambia jail further exacerbated relations. In February 2015 Sheriff Morgan severed ties with both the federal Joint Terrorism Task Force headed by the FBI, and the U.S. Marshal's Regional Fugitive Task Force, pulling the deputies assigned to those duties. Again the issue was one of information dissemination. In December 2015 agreement was reached with the U.S. Attorney's office in Tallahassee to rejoin both task forces.

Controversy arose in 2013 when ECSO deputies shot a 60-year-old unarmed man in his driveway.

Escambia County Sheriff's office investigation into the June 8, 2017 death of Deanna Stevison has also been called out as controversial, due to the lack of follow-up on evidence contradicting the claims made by the three suspects in their police interviews, and the former employment of one of the suspects by Escambia County Sheriff's office and her relationship with the lead investigator of this case. Deanna Stevison's case is currently being profiled in the podcast Stand Our Ground.

The canines of the sheriff's office received national honors at the U.S. Police Canine Association National Police Dog Trials in October 2014, where they had the top team scores.

Before leaving office in early 2021, Sheriff David Morgan used $75,000 in office funds to commission a life-sized metal statue of himself. He said his intent was use the figure of himself saluting as an addition to the office's memorial to fallen officers. The new Sheriff Chip Simmons declined to install the statue in front of the office's main entrance.

=== List of sheriffs ===
- Henri Peire 1821
- Charles Bradford 1821–1822
- William Davison 1823–1826
- Charles Mifflin 1827
- Henry Wilson 1828
- Adam Gordon 1829
- James Pendleton 1829–1830
- Florencio Commyns 1830–1837
- Jesse Allen 1837–1840
- Peter Woodbine 1840–1842
- Ebenezer Dorr IV 1842–1846
- Mortimar Bright 1846
- Angus Nicholson 1846–1847
- Antoine Collins 1847–1851
- Francis de la Rua 1851–1852
- Francis Maura 1852–1854
- Joseph Crosby 1854–1857
- William Jordan 1857–1859
- Daniel Williams 1859–1865
- James B. Roberts 1865–1868
- George Wentworth 1868–1870
- Henry Campbell 1870
- E. R. Payne 1870
- George Wells 1870–1874
- J. N. Coombs 1874–1875
- A. M. Green 1875–1877
- W. H. Hutchison 1877–1885
- Joseph Wilkins 1885–1893
- George E. Smith 1893–1903
- James C. Van Pelt 1903–1913
- A. Cary Ellis 1913–1917
- James C. Van Pelt 1917–1919
- Hurdis S. Whitaker 1919–1921
- A. Cary Ellis 1921–1923
- Mose S. Penton 1923–1932
- H. E. Gandy 1932–1941
- Howard L. Mayes 1941–1945
- R. L. Kendrick 1945–1957
- Emmett Shelby 1957–1961
- Bill Davis 1961–1970
- Royal Untreiner 1970–1981
- J. "Vince" Sealy 1981–1989
- Charlie Johnson 1989–1993
- Jim Lowman 1993–2001
- Ron McNesby 2001–2009
- David Morgan 2009–2021
- Chip Simmons 2021–Present

Sixteen policemen from this agency have died in the line of duty.

=== Television ===
The sheriff's office produces a television show, every other Tuesday, entitled Your Escambia County Sheriff’s Report. It is broadcast on Blab TV (Cox Channel 1006).

In 2015 the Escambia sheriff's office was twice featured on the reality program Cops.

== See also ==
- Pensacola metropolitan area
