= C. E. Hooper =

Audience measurement company

The C. E. Hooper Company was an American company which measured radio and television ratings during the Golden Age of Radio. Founded in 1934 by Claude E. Hooper (1898–1954), the company provided information on the most popular radio shows of the era.

Claude E. Hooper became well known for his radio audience measurement systems, Hooper Ratings or "Hooperatings". Before beginning work in radio measurement, Hooper was an auditor of magazine circulation. Hooper worked within the market research organization of Daniel Starch until 1934, when he left to start a research company with colleague Montgomery Clark, Clark-Hooper. In the fall of 1934, the company launched syndicated radio measurement services in 16 cities. Clark left the business in 1938 and Hooper continued the firm as C. E. Hooper, Inc.

The survey method employed by Hooper was designed with the help of George Gallup (see Gallup Poll), whose input Hooper later acknowledged as key. It differed from the method being used by the advertising industry service, the Cooperative Analysis of Broadcasting (CAB); in particular, Clark-Hooper's method involved contacting listeners during the shows being analyzed as opposed to the following day. In the industry, the method was dubbed "telephone coincidence"; it superseded CAB's earlier method ("telephone recall") as the industry standard, and Hooper's prevalence eventually led to the 1946 dissolution of CAB.

In 1948, as the radio networks began venturing into television, Hooper began measuring TV ratings as well. In February 1950, the company was bought by competitor A.C. Nielsen.

== Method ==
The C. E. Hooper Company collected data using telephone surveys conducted across 36 cities, during the last 13 minutes of each quarter hour broadcast period. Respondents would be asked whether they were presently listening to the radio, and if they were, to identify the program and station they were listening to, and the program's sponsor. Using this data, biweekly ratings were compiled.

Compared to the earlier Crossley ratings, Hooperatings had the advantage of not depending on respondents remembering what they had listened to earlier in the day. However, they still only sampled an urban rather than rural population. They also failed to account for the millions of households at the time which had a radio set but no telephone.

== In popular culture ==
During the late 1940s the catchphrase "How's your Hooper?" was a well-known allusion to the size of a series' audience.

In 1949, the Chagrin Valley Little Theater premiered a satire of contemporary radio by Everett Rhodes Castle titled "How's Your Hooper?".

A George Price cartoon in the May 14, 1949 issue of The New Yorker depicts a speeding automobile with a radio antenna being overtaken by a Hooper employee in the sidecar of a motorcycle who is shouting "We're from the Hooper Survey, sir. Do you have your radio on, and if so what program are you listening to?"

A 1947 radio skit has Henry Morgan and Arnold Stang sarcastically discussing each other's radio shows. Morgan says " … by the way, how's your Hooper rating?", to which Stang replies "Wells, it's eh...ehh...aw, that rating doesn't mean a thing...".

== See also ==
- Arbitron
- Crossley ratings
- Nielsen ratings
