= Eager Lion =

Multinational military exercise in Jordan

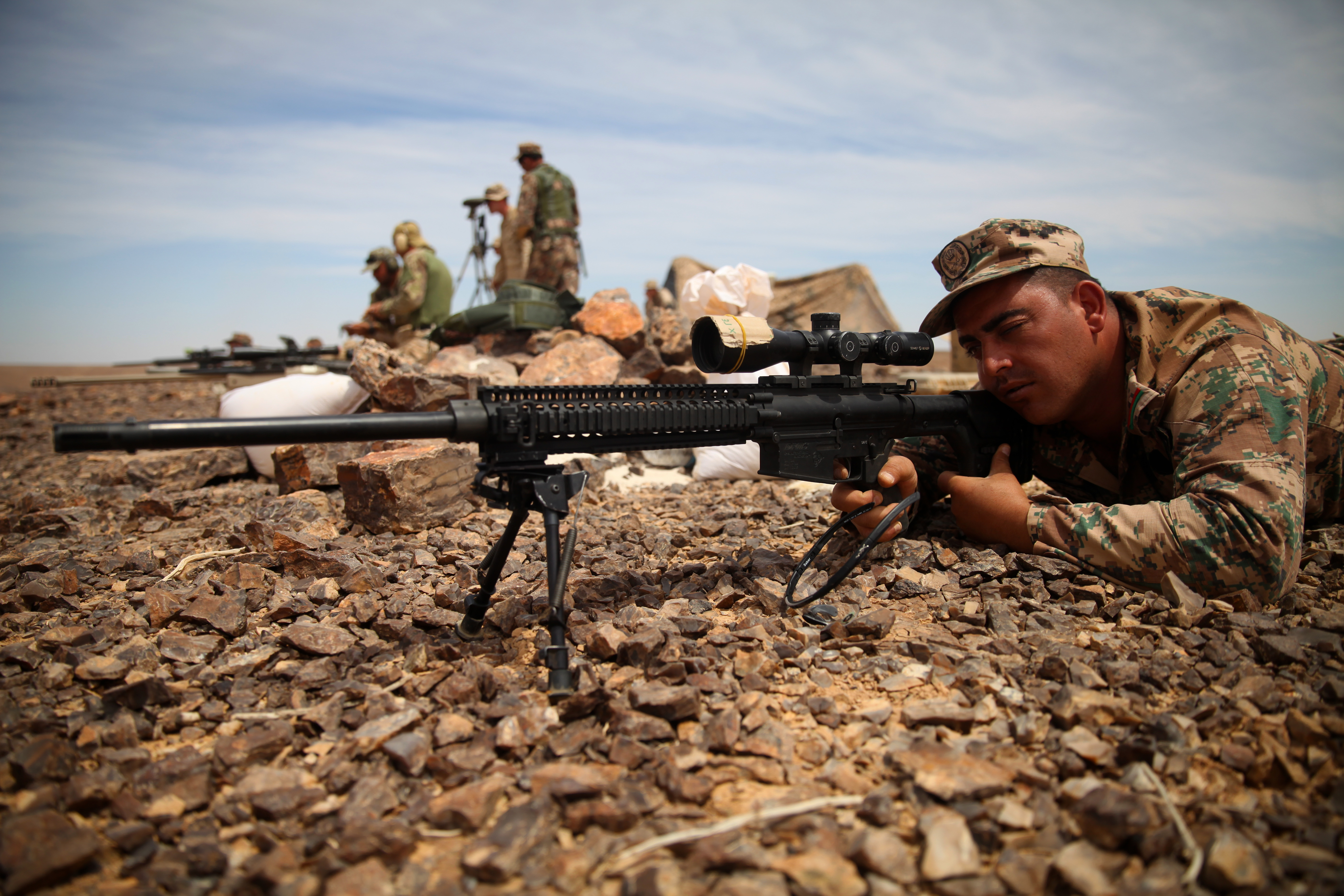
Jordanian Armed Forces sniper

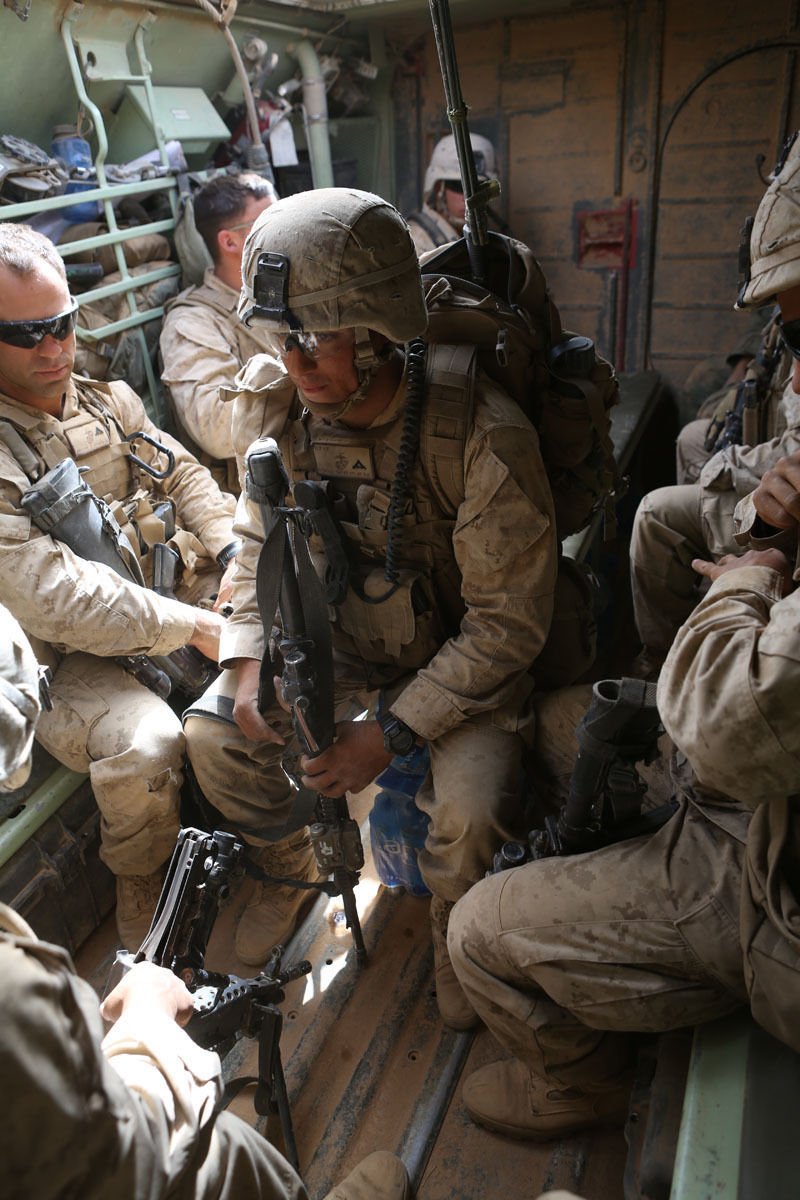
U.S. Marines with Battalion Landing Team 1/6, Charlie Company, 2nd Platoon

Eager Lion is a two-week multinational military exercise held annually in Jordan since 2010. Organized by the U.S. Department of Defense, the exercise revolves around troop deployments, chemical warfare, border security, command and control, cyber defense and battlespace management. According to one source, the exercise "amounts to an outgrowth of the annual bilateral 'Infinite Moonlight' U.S.–Jordan exercise that stretches back to the 1990s."

Eighteen countries participated in the exercise in 2015: Jordan, the United Kingdom, France, Italy, Pakistan, the United States, Canada, Belgium, Poland, Australia, Kuwait, Bahrain, Qatar, Saudi Arabia, Egypt, the UAE, Lebanon, Iraq, and Yemen. Eager Lion is now the largest U.S. military exercise in the Middle East, having surpassed Bright Star.

== Participants ==
- Jordan
- United States
- United Kingdom
- United Arab Emirates
- Australia
- Greece
- Cyprus
- Iraq
- Saudi Arabia
- Qatar
- Bahrain
- Kuwait
- Canada
- Poland
- France
- Italy
- Egypt
- Pakistan
