= Joseph Cotten on stage, screen, radio and television =

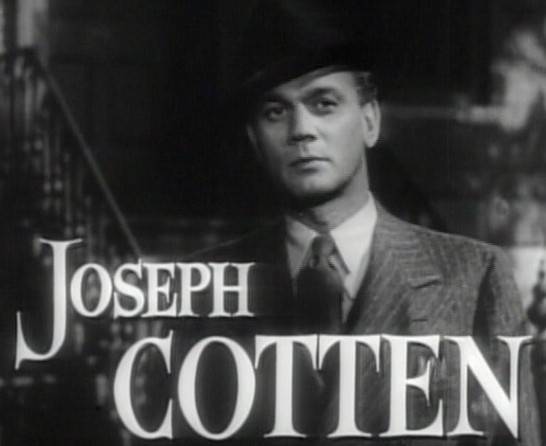
Cotten in 1943

Joseph Cotten was an American actor known for his roles on stage and screen. Cotten's most notable projects include his collaborations with Orson Welles. He portrayed Jed Leland in Citizen Kane (1941), Eugene Morgan in The Magnificent Ambersons (1942), and Howard Graham in Journey into Fear (1943). He continued to act alongside Welles in films such as The Third Man (1949), Othello (1951), Touch of Evil (1958), and F for Fake (1973),

He gained stardom for his roles in Shadow of a Doubt (1943), Gaslight (1944), Duel in the Sun (1946), Under Capricorn (1949), and Niagara (1953). He won the Venice International Film Festival Award for his performance in Portrait of Jennie (1948). He also acted in Hush...Hush, Sweet Charlotte (1964), Tora! Tora! Tora! (1970), Soylent Green (1973), A Delicate Balance (1973), A Whisper in the Dark (1976), Airport '77 (1977), The Perfect Crime (1978), and Heaven's Gate (1980). His final film role was in The Survivor (1981).

== Stage ==
Date	Title	Role	Notes	Ref.
October 17, 1932 – January 1933	Absent Father	Larry	Vanderbilt Theatre, New York	
December 19, 1933 – January 1934	Jezebel	Dick Ashley	Ethel Barrymore Theatre, New York	
February 4 – 1934	Loose Moments	Ralph Merkes	Vanderbilt Theatre, New York	
September 26 – December 5, 1936	Horse Eats Hat	Freddy	Maxine Elliott Theatre, New York	
January 8 – April 1, 1937	Faustus	2nd Scholar	Maxine Elliott Theatre, New York	
April 21–23, 1937	The Second Hurricane	Airplane pilot	Henry Street Settlement, New York City	
November 11, 1937 – May 28, 1938	Caesar	Publius	Mercury Theatre, New York; Moved to the larger National Theatre January 24, 1938	
December 25, 1937	The Shoemaker's Holiday	Rowland Lacy	Mercury Theatre, New York; Surprise preview performance immediately following Caesar	
January 1 – April 28, 1938	The Shoemaker's Holiday	Rowland Lacy	Mercury Theatre, New York; Moved to the National Theatre January 26, 1938	
August 16–29, 1938	Too Much Johnson	Augustus Billings	Stony Creek Theatre, Stony Creek, Connecticut	
November 2–19, 1938	Danton's Death	Barrere	Mercury Theatre, New York	
March 28, 1939 – March 30, 1940	The Philadelphia Story	C. K. Dexter Haven	Shubert Theatre, New York	
November 11, 1953 – August 21, 1954	Sabrina Fair	Linus Larrabee Jr.	National Theatre, New York; Moved to the Royale Theatre May 17, 1954	
October 21, 1958 – June 6, 1959	Once More with Feeling	Victor Fabian	National Theatre, New York	

== Screen ==
Year	Title	Role	Notes
1937	Seeing the World: Part One – A Visit to New York, N.Y.		Short
1938	Too Much Johnson	Augustus Billings	
1940	Citizen Kane trailer	Himself, Jedediah "Jed" Leland	Short
1941	Citizen Kane	Jed Leland / Screening Room Reporter	
1941	Lydia	Michael Fitzpatrick	
1942	The Magnificent Ambersons	Eugene Morgan	
1943	Journey into Fear	Howard Graham	Screenplay (with uncredited Orson Welles)
1943	Shadow of a Doubt	Uncle Charles Oakley	
1943	Hers to Hold	Bill Morley	
1944	Gaslight	Brian Cameron	
1944	Since You Went Away	Lieutenant Tony Willett	
1944	I'll Be Seeing You	Zachary Morgan	
1945	Love Letters	Alan Quinton	
1946	Duel in the Sun	Jesse McCanles	
1947	The Farmer's Daughter	Glenn Morley	
1948	Portrait of Jennie	Eben Adams	Venice Film Festival Award for Best Actor
1949	The Third Man	Holly Martins	
1949	Under Capricorn	Sam Flusky	
1949	Beyond the Forest	Dr. Lewis Moline	
1950	September Affair	David Lawrence	
1950	Two Flags West	Colonel Clay Tucker	
1950	Walk Softly, Stranger	Chris Hale	Shot in 1948
1951	Half Angel	John Raymond Jr.	
1951	Peking Express	Michael Bachlin	
1951	Othello	Venetian senator	Uncredited
1951	The Man with a Cloak	Dupin	
1952	The Wild Heart	Narrator	
1952	Untamed Frontier	Kirk Denbow	
1952	The Steel Trap	James Osborne	
1953	Niagara	George Loomis	
1953	Egypt by Three	Narrator	
1953	A Blueprint for Murder	Whitney Cameron	
1955	Special Delivery	John Adams	
1955	Bedevilled	Flight announcer at the airport	Voice, Uncredited
1956	The Bottom of the Bottle	P.M. Martin	
1956	The Killer Is Loose	Detective Sam Wagner	
1957	The Halliday Brand	Daniel Halliday	
1958	Touch of Evil	Coroner	Uncredited
1958	From the Earth to the Moon	Victor Barbicane	
1960	The Angel Wore Red	Hawthorne	
1961	The Last Sunset	John Breckenridge	
1964	Hush...Hush, Sweet Charlotte	Dr. Drew Bayliss	
1965	The Great Sioux Massacre	Major Reno	
1965	The Money Trap	Dr. Horace Van Tilden	
1965	The Tramplers	Temple Cordeen	
1966	The Oscar	Kenneth H. Regan	
1966	Brighty of the Grand Canyon	Jim Owen	
1967	The Hellbenders	Colonel Jonas	
1967	Some May Live	Colonel Woodward	
1967	Jack of Diamonds	Ace of Diamonds	
1968	Days of Fire	Destil	
1968	Petulia	Mr. Danner	
1968	White Comanche	Sheriff Logan	
1969	Latitude Zero	Captain Craig McKenzie	
1969	Keene		
1970	The Grasshopper	Richard Morgan	
1970	Tora! Tora! Tora!	Henry L. Stimson	
1971	The Abominable Dr. Phibes	Dr. Vesalius	
1971	Lady Frankenstein	Dr. Frankenstein	
1972	Doomsday Voyage	Captain Jason	
1972	Baron Blood	Baron Otto von Kleist / Alfred Becker	
1972	The Scientific Cardplayer	George	
1973	Soylent Green	William R. Simonson	
1973	F for Fake	Special Participant	
1973	A Delicate Balance	Harry	
1975	Syndicate Sadists	Paternò	
1975	Timber Tramps	Greedy Sawmill Mogul	
1976	A Whisper in the Dark	The Professor	
1977	Twilight's Last Gleaming	Secretary of State Arthur Renfrew	
1977	Airport '77	Nicholas St. Downs III	
1978	Last In, First Out	Foster Johnson	
1978	Caravans	Ambassador Crandall	
1978	The Perfect Crime	Sir Arthur Dundee	
1979	Island of the Fishmen	Professor Ernest Marvin	
1979	The Concorde Affair	Milland	
1979	Guyana: Crime of the Century	Richard Gable	
1980	The Hearse	Walter Pritchard	
1980	Heaven's Gate	The Reverend Doctor	
1980	Delusion	Ivar Langrock	
1981	The Survivor	Priest	Final film role

== Radio ==
Date	Title	Role	Notes
1934	The American School of the Air	Repertory cast	
July 14 – September 22, 1935	America's Hour	Repertory cast	
1935	Farm Tenancy		Resettlement Administration drama
November 14, 1936	Columbia Workshop		"Hamlet"
May 9, 1937	The Second Hurricane	Airplane pilot	One-hour broadcast on CBS Radio
September 5, 1938	The Mercury Theatre on the Air	Dr. Bull	"The Man Who Was Thursday"
October 9, 1938	The Mercury Theatre on the Air		"Hell on Ice"
October 16, 1938	The Mercury Theatre on the Air	Genesis	"Seventeen"
December 3, 1938	The Campbell Playhouse	Fred	"A Christmas Carol"
January 6, 1939	The Campbell Playhouse		"Counsellor-at-Law"
January 13, 1939	The Campbell Playhouse	Fletcher Christian	"Mutiny on the Bounty"
January 20, 1939	The Campbell Playhouse		"The Chicken Wagon Family"
January 27, 1939	The Campbell Playhouse	Riley	"I Lost My Girlish Laughter"
September 17, 1939	The Campbell Playhouse		"Ah, Wilderness!"
October 22, 1939	The Campbell Playhouse	The Cashier	"Liliom"
1939–40	The Career of Alice Blair	Male lead	
February 11, 1940	The Campbell Playhouse		"Mr. Deeds Goes to Town"
September 22, 1941	Lux Radio Theatre	Michael Fitzpatrick	"Lydia"
October 6, 1941	The Orson Welles Show		
October 13, 1941	The Orson Welles Show		
October 20, 1941	The Orson Welles Show		
November 10, 1941	The Orson Welles Show		
December 1, 1941	The Orson Welles Show		
December 7, 1941	The Orson Welles Show		
December 22, 1941	The Orson Welles Show		
December 29, 1941	The Orson Welles Show		
March 22, 1942	The Silver Theatre	Jim Emerson	"Only Yesterday"
November 23, 1942	Ceiling Unlimited		"The Navigator"
December 21, 1942	Ceiling Unlimited		"Gremlins"
December 28, 1942	Ceiling Unlimited		"Pan American Airlines"
January 17, 1943	Hello Americans		"Feed the World"
February 1, 1943	Cavalcade of America		"To the Shores of Tripoli"
May 24, 1943	The Screen Guild Theater	Uncle Charlie	"Shadow of a Doubt"
June 28, 1943	Lux Radio Theatre		"The Great Man's Lady"
August 8, 1943 – April 30, 1944	America – Ceiling Unlimited	Host	Weekly half-hour variety series
December 6, 1943	The Screen Guild Theater	Jim Emerson	"Only Yesterday"
March 23, 1944	Suspense		"Sneak Preview"
May 8, 1944	Lux Radio Theatre	Roger Adams	"Penny Serenade"
June 5, 1944	Cavalcade of America		"Treason"
September 14, 1944	Suspense		"You'll Never See Me Again"
November 6, 1944	Democratic National Committee Program		Election-eve political broadcast
November 13, 1944	The Screen Guild Theater	Johnny Case	"Holiday"
November 26, 1944	The Harold Lloyd Comedy Theatre		"Clarence"
February 1, 1945	Suspense		"The Most Dangerous Game"
February 6, 1945	A Date with Judy	Guest	"The Strange Case of Joseph Cotten"
April 30, 1945	The Screen Guild Theater	Alessandro	"Ramona"
June 4, 1945	Lux Radio Theatre	Holger Brandt	"Intermezzo"
June 15, 1945	Weapon for Tomorrow		"Freedom of Information"
September 18, 1945	Theater of Romance	Nathan Hale	"One Life to Lose"
September 20, 1945	The Birdseye Open House	Guest	
September 27, 1945	Suspense		"The Earth Is Made of Glass"
October 11, 1945	Suspense		"Beyond Good and Evil"
November 26, 1945	The Screen Guild Theater	Richard Kurt	"Biography of a Bachelor Girl"
December 24, 1945	Lux Radio Theatre	Zachary Morgan	"I'll Be Seeing You"
January 17, 1946	Suspense		"The Pasteboard Box"
February 10, 1946	Radio Reader's Digest		"Ultimate Security"
April 22, 1946	Lux Radio Theatre	Alan Quinton	"Love Letters"
May 2, 1946	Suspense		"Crime Without Passion"
July 24, 1946	Academy Award Theatre		"Foreign Correspondent"
September 11, 1946	Academy Award Theatre		"Shadow of a Doubt"
September 24, 1946	The Cresta Blanca Hollywood Players	Lou Gehrig	"The Pride of the Yankees"
October 1, 1946	The Cresta Blanca Hollywood Players	Max de Winter	"Rebecca"
November 4, 1946	Lux Radio Theatre		"I've Always Loved You"
December 5, 1946	Radio Reader's Digest		"The Hard-Boiled Reporter and the Miracle"
December 16, 1946	The Screen Guild Theater	Michael	"This Love of Ours"
December 19, 1946	Suspense		"The Thing in the Window"
December 25, 1946	The Cresta Blanca Hollywood Players		"All Through the House"
January 27, 1947	The Screen Guild Theater		"Swell Guy"
March 5, 1947	The Eagle's Brood		Documentary on juvenile delinquency
May 15, 1947	Radio Reader's Digest		"Halfway to Reno"
May 19, 1947	Cavalcade of America		"Witness by Moonlight"
September 15, 1947	Lux Radio Theatre	Nicholas	"The Seventh Veil"
October 26, 1947	Hollywood Fights Back		
January 5, 1948	Lux Radio Theatre	Glenn Morley	"The Farmer's Daughter"
January 26, 1948	Lux Radio Theatre	Devlin	"Notorious"
February 12, 1948	Radio Reader's Digest		"The Baron of Arizona"
March 8, 1948	Lux Radio Theatre	John Ballantyne	"Spellbound"
April 11, 1948	The Eternal Light		"The Man Who Remembered Lincoln"
June 21, 1948	The Screen Guild Theater	Uncle Charlie	"Shadow of a Doubt"
May 9, 1949	Lux Radio Theatre	Anthony Keane	"The Paradine Case"
May 15, 1949	Prudential Family Hour of Stars		"Breakdown"
June 30, 1949	Suspense		"The Day I Died"
October 24, 1946	Screen Directors Playhouse	Alan Quinton	"Love Letters"
October 31, 1949	Lux Radio Theatre	Eben Adams	"Portrait of Jennie"
March 10, 1950	Screen Directors Playhouse	Eben Adams	"Portrait of Jennie"
March 15, 1950	Family Theater		"Germelshausen"
March 30, 1950	Suspense		"Blood Sacrifice"
June 11, 1950	Guest Star		"Portrait of a Small Gentleman"
September 28, 1950	Suspense		"Fly by Night"
October 9, 1950	Hollywood Star Playhouse		"Of Night and the River"
November 30, 1950	Screen Directors Playhouse		"Mrs. Mike"
January 2, 1951	Cavalcade of America		"An American from France"
January 7, 1951	Theatre Guild on the Air	Holly Martins	"The Third Man"
January 25, 1951	Screen Directors Playhouse		"Spellbound"
February 15, 1951	Hallmark Playhouse		"A Man for All Ages"
April 9, 1951	Lux Radio Theatre	Holly Martins	"The Third Man"
September 30, 1951	Theatre Guild on the Air		"Main Street"
October 2, 1951	Philip Morris Playhouse on Broadway		"Angel Street"
October 18, 1951	Hallmark Playhouse		"Cashel Byron's Profession"
November 5, 1951	Suspense		"The Trials of Thomas Shaw"
January 24, 1952	Stars in the Air		"Enchantment"
January 28, 1952	Suspense		"Carnival"
January 31, 1952	Hallmark Playhouse		"Westward Ho"
March 6, 1952	Hallmark Playhouse		"Man Without a Home"
March 10, 1952	Suspense		"A Watery Grave"
March 16, 1952	Philip Morris Playhouse on Broadway		"In a Lonely Place"
March 27, 1952	The Screen Guild Theater		"Night Must Fall"
September 7, 1952	Hollywood Star Playhouse		"The Tenth Planet"
September 14, 1952	Theatre Guild On the Air		"The Wisteria Tree"
October 12, 1952	Hallmark Playhouse		"Young Mr. Disraeli"
December 22, 1952	Suspense		"Arctic Rescue"
December 28, 1952	Hallmark Playhouse		"A Man Called Peter"
January 11, 1953	Theatre Guild On the Air		"Jane"
January 14, 1953	Philip Morris Playhouse on Broadway		"Hold Back the Dawn"
January 18, 1953	Theatre Guild on the Air		"Trial by Forgery"
January 26, 1953	Lux Radio Theatre	David Lawrence	"September Affair"
March 1, 1953	The Bakers' Theater of Stars		"The Mango Tree"
March 30, 1953	Suspense		"Tom Dooley"
June 16, 1953	The Martin and Lewis Show	Guest	
July 6, 1953	Lux Summer Theatre	Jim Warlock	"Cynara"
August 3, 1953	Lux Summer Theatre		"Romance, to a Degree"
August 26, 1953	Philip Morris Playhouse on Broadway		"Love Letters"
September 14, 1953	Lux Radio Theatre	Jim Osborne	"The Steel Trap"
October 14, 1953	Radio Playhouse	Narrator	"Routine Assignment"
October 24, 1953	The Grand Alliance		United Nations Day broadcast
May 15, 1954	Salute to Eugene O'Neill	Narrator	All-star benefit for cerebral palsy
December 15, 1957	Suspense		"An Occurrence at Owl Creek Bridge"
August 2, 1959	Suspense		"Red Cloud Mesa"

== Television ==
TV movies are listed in the film credits section.

Year	Series/Miniseries	Role	Episode(s)
1954	Producers' Showcase	Grant Matthews	"State of the Union"
1954	General Electric Theater	Hanley	"The High Green Wall"
1955	The Best of Broadway	Dan McCorn	"Broadway"
1955	Celebrity Playhouse	Marshal Fenton Lockhart	"Showdown at San Pablo"
1955	Alfred Hitchcock Presents	William Callew	Season 1 Episode 7: "Breakdown"
1955–1956	Star Stage	Narrator; Alexander Holmes	"The Man in the Black Robe" "The U.S. vs. Alexander Holmes"
1956	The Ford Television Theatre	John Ashburn	"Man Without a Fear"
1956	General Electric Theater	Captain; Private Harris	"H.M.S. Marlborough Will Enter Port" "The Enemies"
1956–1959	The Joseph Cotten Show	Various roles	
1957	The Jane Wyman Show	Bruce Malone	"Contact"
1957	Telephone Time	Lieutenant Commander Joseph P. Fyffe	"The Man the Navy Couldn't Sink"
1957	Playhouse 90	Robert Rainey	"The Edge of Innocence"
1957	Schlitz Playhouse		"Neighbors"
1958	Zane Grey Theatre	Ben Harper	"Man Unforgiving"
1958	Suspicion	Gregg Carey	"The Eye of Truth"
1958	Alfred Hitchcock Presents	Tony Gould	Season 3 Episode 15: "Together"
1959	Westinghouse Desilu Playhouse	Black McSween	"The Day the Town Stood Up"
1959	Alfred Hitchcock Presents	Courtney Nesbitt Masterson	Season 5 Episode 9: "Dead Weight"
1960	The DuPont Show with June Allyson	Dick Burlingame; Charles Lawrence	"The Blue Goose" "Dark Fear"
1960	Checkmate	Dr. George Mallinson	"Face in the Window"
1961	The Barbara Stanwyck Show	Mac McClay	"The Hitch-Hiker"
1961	Bus Stop	Professor Wheelright	"Cherie"
1961	Theatre '62	Alex Sebastian	"Notorious"
1961	Wagon Train	Captain Dan Brady	"The Captain Dan Brady Story"
1961	Wagon Train	John Augustus	"The John Augustus Story"
1962	Dr. Kildare	Charles Ladovan	"The Administrator"
1962	Saints and Sinners	Preston Cooper	"The Man on the Rim"
1963	The Great Adventure	Captain Meehan	"The Death of Sitting Bull" "The Massacre at Wounded Knee"
1963	77 Sunset Strip	Arnold Buhler	"By His Own Verdict"
1963	Alexander the Great	Antigonus	Television movie
1963–1964	Hollywood and the Stars	Narrator	31 episodes
1967	Cimarron Strip	Nathan Tio	"The Search"
1968	Ironside	Dr. Benjamin Stern	"Split Second to an Epitaph"
1968	It Takes a Thief	Colonel Heinrich	"Hans Across the Border"
1968	Journey to the Unknown		"Do Me a Favour and Kill Me" (UK)
1969–1970	It Takes a Thief	Mr. Jack	"To Lure a Man" "To Sing a Song of Murder" "Beyond a Reasonable Doubt"
1969	The Lonely Profession	Martin Bannister	Television movie
1970	Cutter's Trail	General Spalding	Television movie; failed series pilot
1970	The Name of the Game	Henry Worthington Rayner	"The King of Denmark"
1970	The Virginian	Judge Will McMasters; Judge Hobbs	"A Time of Terror" "Gun Quest"
1971	Assault on the Wayne	Admiral	Television movie
1971	Do You Take This Stranger?	Dr. Robert Carson	Television movie
1971	City Beneath the Sea	Dr. Ziegler	Television movie
1971	Journey to the Unknown	Jeff Wheeler	Two 1968 episodes from the UK anthology series
1971	NET Playhouse	Narrator	"Trail of Tears"
1972	The Screaming Woman	George Tresvant	Television movie
1973	The Streets of San Francisco	John R. James	"A Collection of Eagles"
1973	The Devil's Daughter	Judge Weatherby	Television movie
1974	The Rockford Files	Warner Jameson	"This Case is Closed"
1976	Origins of the Mafia	The Envoy	Miniseries; "Gli antenati"
1976	The Lindbergh Kidnapping Case	Dr. Joseph Francis Condon	Television movie
1976	Freedom Is	Voice	Television movie
1977	Aspen	Horton Paine	Television miniseries
1978	The Hardy Boys/Nancy Drew Mysteries	Weldon Rathbone	"Arson and Old Lace"
1978	Fantasy Island	Simon Grant	"Return to Fantasy Island"
1979	Fantasy Island	Thomas Cummings	"The Wedding"
1979	Churchill and the Generals	General George C. Marshall	Television movie
1979–1980	Tales of the Unexpected (the UK series)	Edward (Series 1); Lionel (Series 2)	"Edward the Conqueror" (Series 1) "Depart in Peace" (Series 2)
1980	Casino	Ed Booker	Television movie
1981	The Love Boat	Colonel van Ryker	"The Duel", Two for Julie", and "Aunt Hilly"
