= Ora Nichols =

Pioneering sound effects artist

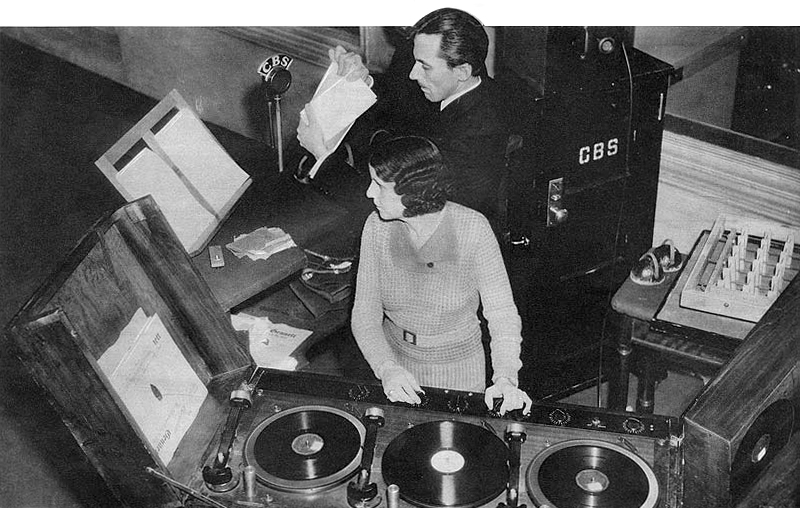
Nichols with assistant George O'Donnell on the set of The March of Time in January 1935

Aurore Dolores Daigle Nichols (March 8, 1893 – November 13, 1951) was a pioneering sound effects artist in American radio broadcasting. She was the first woman to be the head of a sound effects department, and created many sound-producing methods. She worked with Orson Welles, with whom she sometimes clashed.

== Early life ==
Ora Nichols was born Aurore Dolores Daigle in Springfield, Massachusetts, on March 8, 1893.

== Vaudeville and silent films ==
Nichols and her husband, Arthur, began their careers in vaudeville in 1905 as musicians, with Ora playing the piano and Arthur playing the violin. By the 1920s, vaudeville jobs were decreasing; the Nicholses then started to perform in-theater music for silent films. They were required to provide sound effects in addition to music, and Arthur switched to playing drums in order to be better able to produce various noises. They both came to find sound design more interesting than music.

== Radio ==
You can wreck a whole program by missing one sound cue.

–Ora Nichols (to a reporter), 1932.

In 1928, Arthur and Ora Nichols began working in radio, beginning at the Judson Radio Program Corporation and then moving to CBS Radio as unpaid freelance sound designers. CBS then hired them as paid staff, and they, in turn, hired George O'Donnell, a former vaudeville dancer, and Henry Gauthiere as assistants, creating the first sound effects department at an American radio network, located at 485 Madison Avenue in Manhattan. Arthur focused on designing machinery to create sound effects, while Ora served as supervisor of the department, the first woman to fill such a role.

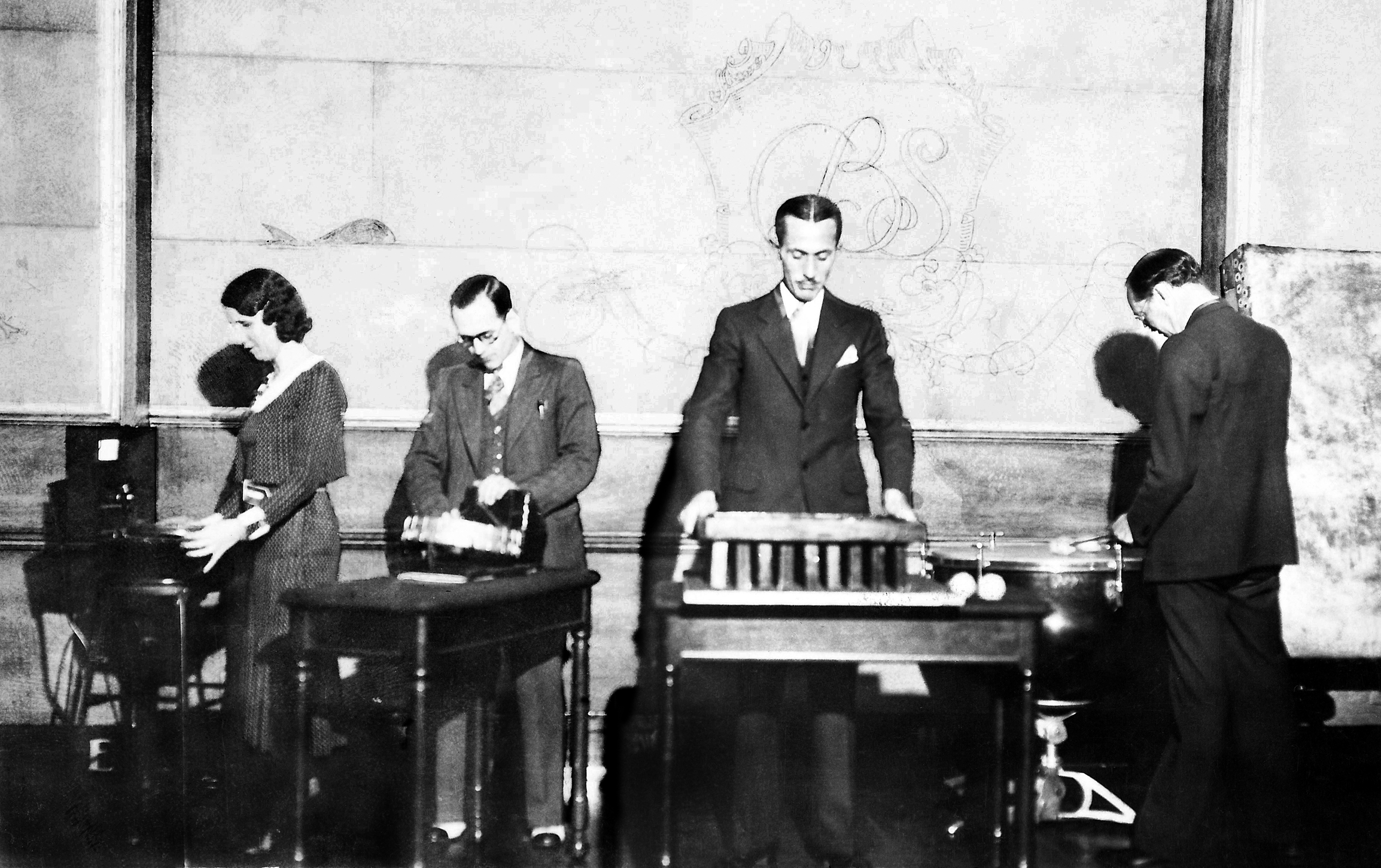
The CBS sound effects team in 1931 (from left): Ora Nichols, Henry Gauthiere, George O'Donnell, and Arthur Nichols

According to sound effects expert Robert L. Mott, Ora Nichols quickly came to be one of the most influential women in radio content and style, ranking with Kate Smith, Amelia Earhart, and Eleanor Roosevelt. The magazine Radio Stars named her one of the "Nine Greatest Women in Radio" in December 1934. Leonard Maltin quotes the article as saying: "I investigated and discovered that Ora Nichols is the most important of any one on that list... She is head of Columbia's sound department. Six men work for her, take her orders. Since she has been with Columbia, Ora D. Nichols has invented 1,000 sounds." Mott credits Ora and Arthur as being "the two people most responsible for bringing sound effects to radio".

Arthur Nichols died of a heart attack in 1931. Ora married drummer Lou Dorough in 1934. In 1935, Ora Nichols decided that she no longer wanted the administrative responsibilities of running the department, so CBS hired Walter Pierson to take over from her, and she returned to full-time work creating sound effects. Al Van Brackel, Max Uhlig, Vic Rubei, Ray Kremer, and Jim Rogan were hired as additional assistants.

Ora Nichols died in Richmond, New York, on November 13, 1951.

=== Work with Orson Welles ===
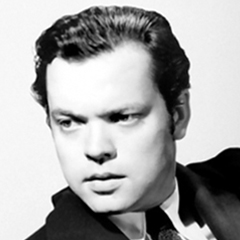
Ora Nichols collaborated – and sometimes clashed – with Orson Welles.

Some of Nichols' most significant work was with Orson Welles. In The March of Time, she would tap out the "SOS" signal on a telegraph key. She provided sound effects for The Mercury Theatre on the Air.

During production of the Mercury Theatre episode "The War of the Worlds" in 1938, Nichols and Welles argued about how to produce sound effects; Welles wanted to use actual sounds, instead of mechanical imitations. Welles angrily called Nichols a "screwball", and she threw off her headphones and walked out of the studio. With airtime rapidly approaching for the live broadcast, Welles quickly apologized, and subsequently wrote Nichols a note saying: "Dearest Ora: Thanks for the best job anybody could ever do for anybody. All my love, Orson."

=== Techniques ===
Among the techniques that Ora Nichols invented are the use of an egg beater next to the microphone to mimic a lawnmower, chopping a cabbage into a wicker basket to sound like decapitation, and twisting a cast iron pan lid to evoke the door of an alien spaceship opening. In the radio series Buck Rogers in the 25th Century, she banged on an air conditioner vent to mimic the sound of rockets.

Arthur Nichols built a sound-effects machine that was five feet high and two feet deep, with nine motors. It produced such sounds as a bird chirping and a machine gun firing.
