= Stony Creek Puppet House =

Coordinates: 41.26445°N 72.75026°W

The Stony Creek Puppet House was a theater in the Stony Creek section of Branford, Connecticut, near New Haven and the Thimble Islands. Built in 1903 as a movie theater, it became the home for community theater and summer stock productions. Orson Welles staged his short-lived stage production, Too Much Johnson, at The Stony Creek Theatre in 1938. After operating as a parachute factory during World War II, it became a puppet theater. The building is a Connecticut Historical Landmark that was renovated into a new live theater venue following a 2013 ownership change, the Legacy Theatre.

== History ==
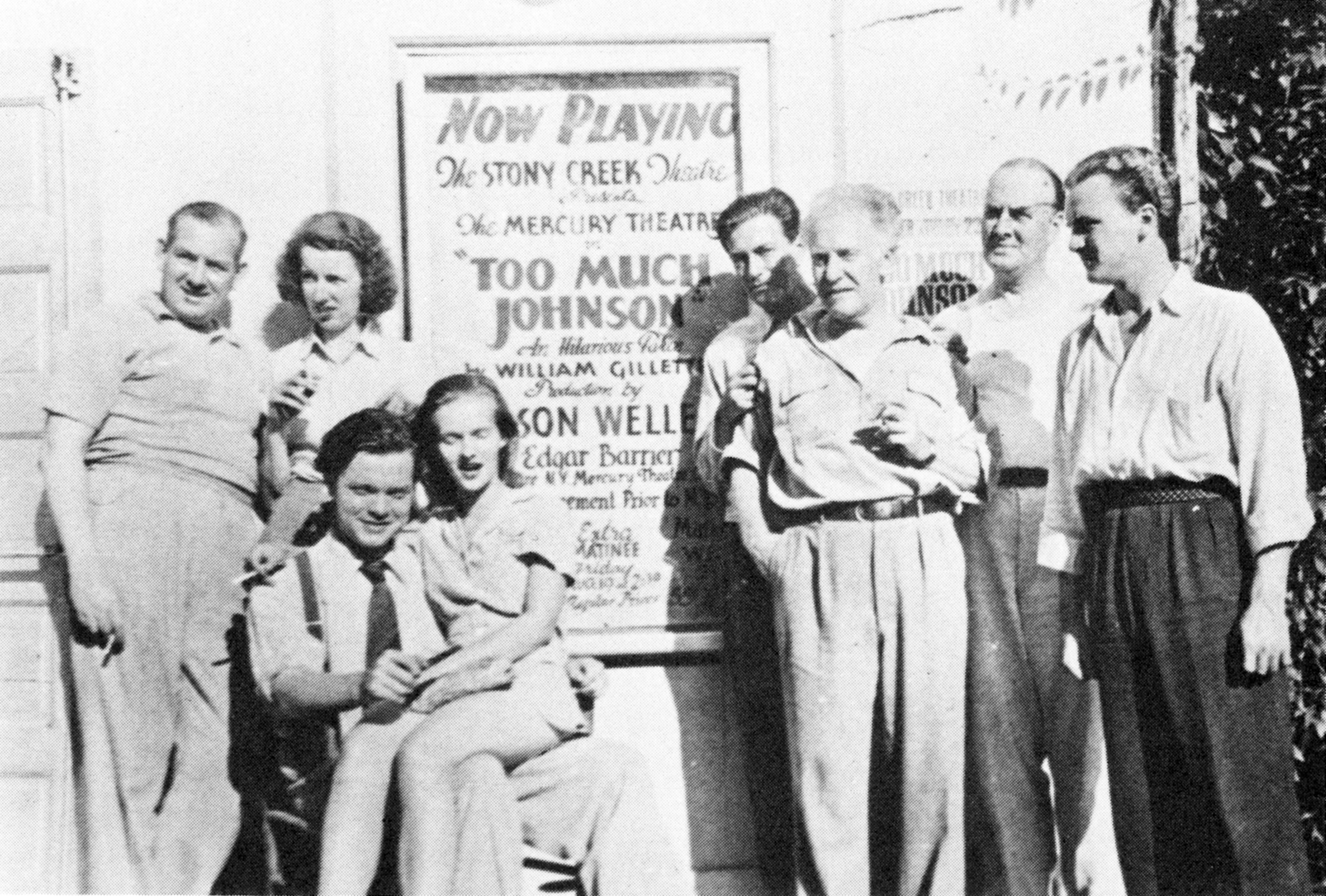
The Mercury Theatre's play Too Much Johnson saw a two-week run in August 1938. Pictured outside the theatre are cast members Howard Smith, Mary Wickes, Orson Welles, Virginia Welles, William Herz, Erskine Sanford, Eustace Wyatt and Joseph Cotten.

=== Lyric Theatre ===
The structure was built in 1903 as a silent movie house called The Lyric Theater. In 1920, a Stony Creek community theater group called the Parish Players purchased the building and opened it as The Stony Creek Theater. It was then home to the famous Parish Players, who, in collaboration with Lee Shubert, presented the pre-Broadway production of Death Takes a Holiday in the building in 1929.

In 1930s the theater became a professional summer stock house. In August 1938 Orson Welles staged a short-lived production of Too Much Johnson, an adaptation of the William Gillette farce. Motion picture sequences that were to provide exposition had to be abandoned due to the theater's lack of projection facilities, and the resulting plot confusion resulted in the production being permanently shelved. Too Much Johnson was performed August 16–29, 1938, with the cast including Joseph Cotten, Edgar Barrier, George Duthie, Ruth Ford, Guy Kingsley, Howard Smith, Virginia Welles, Mary Wickes, Richard Wilson and Eustace Wyatt.

=== Stony Creek Puppet House ===
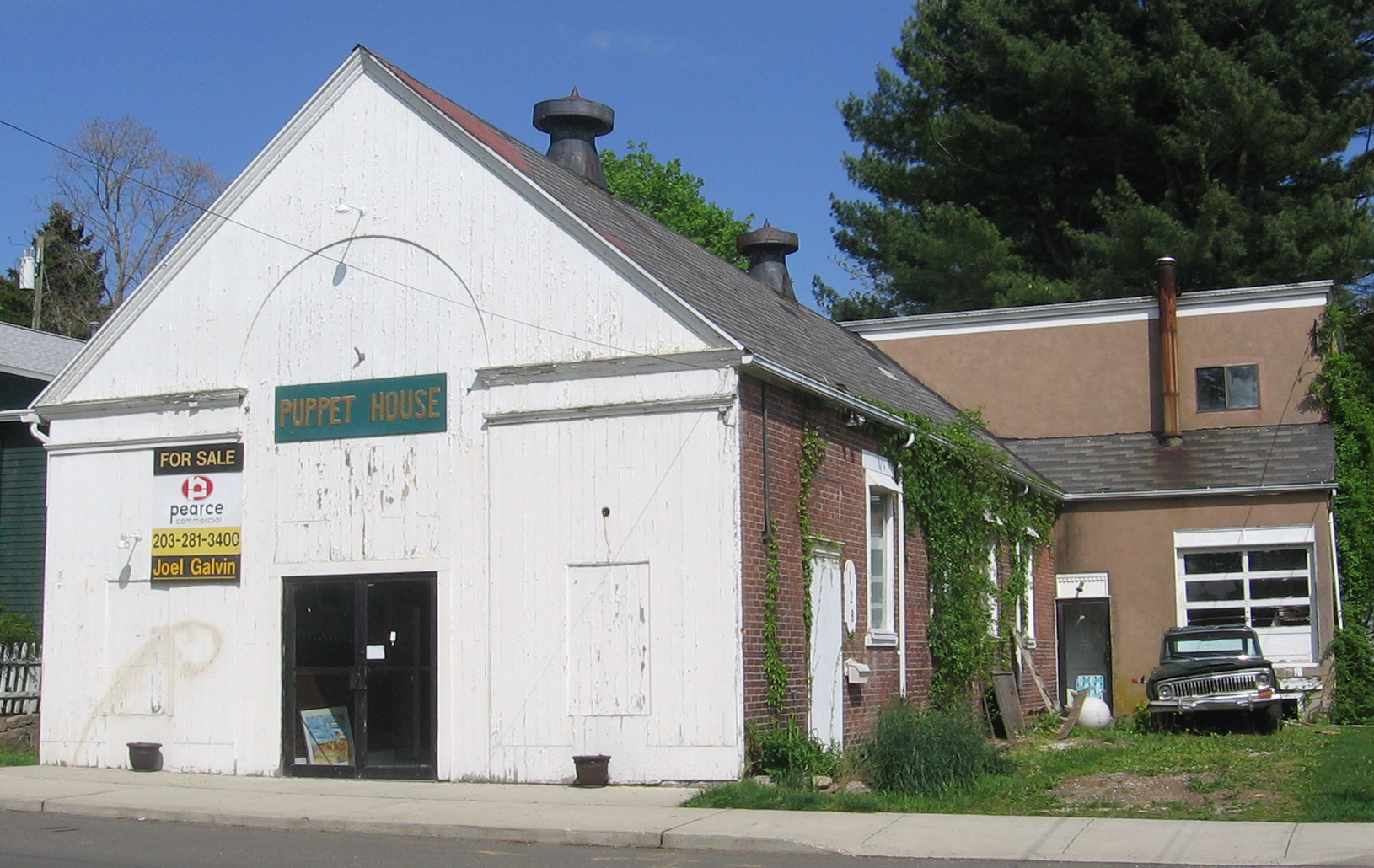
Stony Creek Puppet House in 2012

During World War II, the building was transformed into a parachute factory. In 1960, the building returned to its theatre traditions and became The Stony Creek Puppet House. It featured a collection of traditional 4–5-foot-tall (1.2–1.5 m), 80-pound (36 kg) Sicilian puppets used in Opera dei Pupi. These puppets were the last few remaining of three hundred created by the acknowledged master of the field, Sebastiano Zappala, at the beginning of the 20th century. Their bodies are constructed of steel reinforced hardwood covered with hemp and canvas, with heads hand-carved out of solid walnut and painted with fine detail. Each puppet is immediately identifiable by his distinctive colorful costume, ranging from peasant garb to hand embossed brass suits of armor with individual coats of arms worn by emperors, kings, and knights of Western Europe, to colorful flowing robes worn by Moors from North Africa.

The stories these puppets would portray are those of the ancient European poems and epics, such as Turoldus' "La Chanson de Roland", Ariosto's "Orlando Furioso", Boiardo's "Orlando Innamorato", and Tasso's "Gerusalemme Liberata", bringing to life the glory and spirit of the Crusades, battles of knights and kings, and the struggle of heroes against villains and evil wizards. Glory, fame, justice, love and impossible dreams would be pursued by great characters of history and legend as the plots unfolded before the audience, while comic relief is provided by a traditional buffoon, who acts as a link between the audience and the ancient characters on stage. In the traditional spirit of the Commedia dell'arte, dialogue would be improvised, while sound effects such as drums, trumpets, and the sounds of battle enlivened the action. The great size and sheer presence of these puppets would make their world of history, fantasy, myth and mystery seem to come to life, while the characteristic puppet-like movements would simultaneously lend the play an air of unreality.

The puppeteers would stand six feet above the stage on a structure called "the bridge", manipulating each puppet by a rod attached to the head and torso, another rod attached to the sword hand, and a string attached to the shield hand. In addition to requiring great physical strength and dexterity, each puppeteer was required to manipulate several puppets during the play, giving each a separate personality by its physical movements and gestures.

The building was closed in 2009 due to building and fire code violations.

=== The Legacy Theatre ===
New owners operating as The Legacy Theatre took over the building in 2013. The theatre staged Neil Simon's Barefoot in the Park as the first of its 2021 calendar of live shows.
