= The Mercury Theatre on the Air =

Radio series

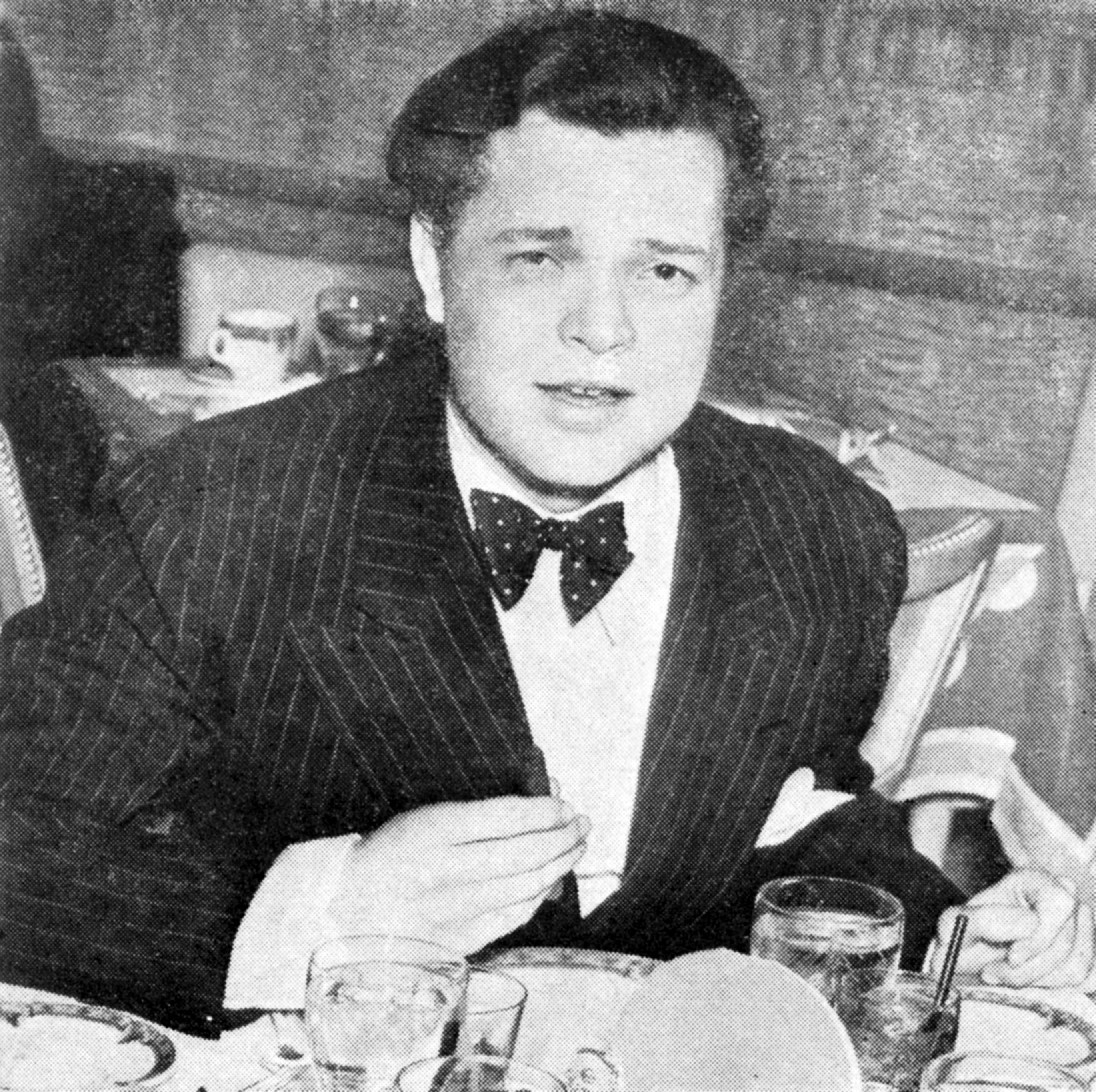
- Orson Welles (July 1938)
- Genre: Anthology drama
- Running time: 60 minutes
- Country of origin: United States
- Language: English
- Home station: CBS
- Hosted by: Orson Welles
- Starring: Orson Welles; William Alland; Edgar Barrier; Ray Collins; Joseph Cotten; George Coulouris; Arlene Francis; Alice Frost; Martin Gabel; Agnes Moorehead; Frank Readick; Elliott Reid; Everett Sloane; Howard Smith; Paul Stewart; Karl Swenson; Virginia Welles; Richard Wilson; Eustace Wyatt
- Announcer: Dan Seymour
- Created by: Orson Welles
- Written by: Orson Welles (writer, script editor); John Houseman (writer, script editor); Howard E. Koch, others
- Directed by: Orson Welles; Paul Stewart (rehearsal director)
- Produced by: John Houseman; Orson Welles; Paul Stewart (associate producer)
- Executive producer: Davidson Taylor (for CBS)
- Narrated by: Orson Welles
- Original release: July 11 – December 4, 1938
- No. of series: 1
- No. of episodes: 22
- Opening theme: Piano Concerto No. 1 in B-flat minor by Tchaikovsky

The Mercury Theatre on the Air is a radio series of live radio dramas created and hosted by Orson Welles. The weekly hour-long show presented classic literary works performed by Welles's celebrated Mercury Theatre repertory company, with music composed or arranged by Bernard Herrmann. (Note: According to the document created by Herrmann (and now in the Bernard Herrmann Papers at the University of California, Santa Barbara) listing all his compositions, the only Mercury show for which he composed new music was "Dracula".) The series began July 11, 1938, as a sustaining program on the CBS Radio network, airing Mondays at 9 pm ET. On September 11, the show moved to Sundays at 8 pm.

The show made headlines with its "The War of the Worlds" broadcast on October 30, one of the most famous broadcasts in the history of radio due to the panic it allegedly caused, after which the Campbell Soup Company signed on as sponsor. The Mercury Theatre on the Air made its last broadcast on December 4 of that year, and The Campbell Playhouse began five days later, on December 9.

== Production ==
The company rehearses "Treasure Island", the second program in The Mercury Theatre on the Air series, presented July 18, 1938.

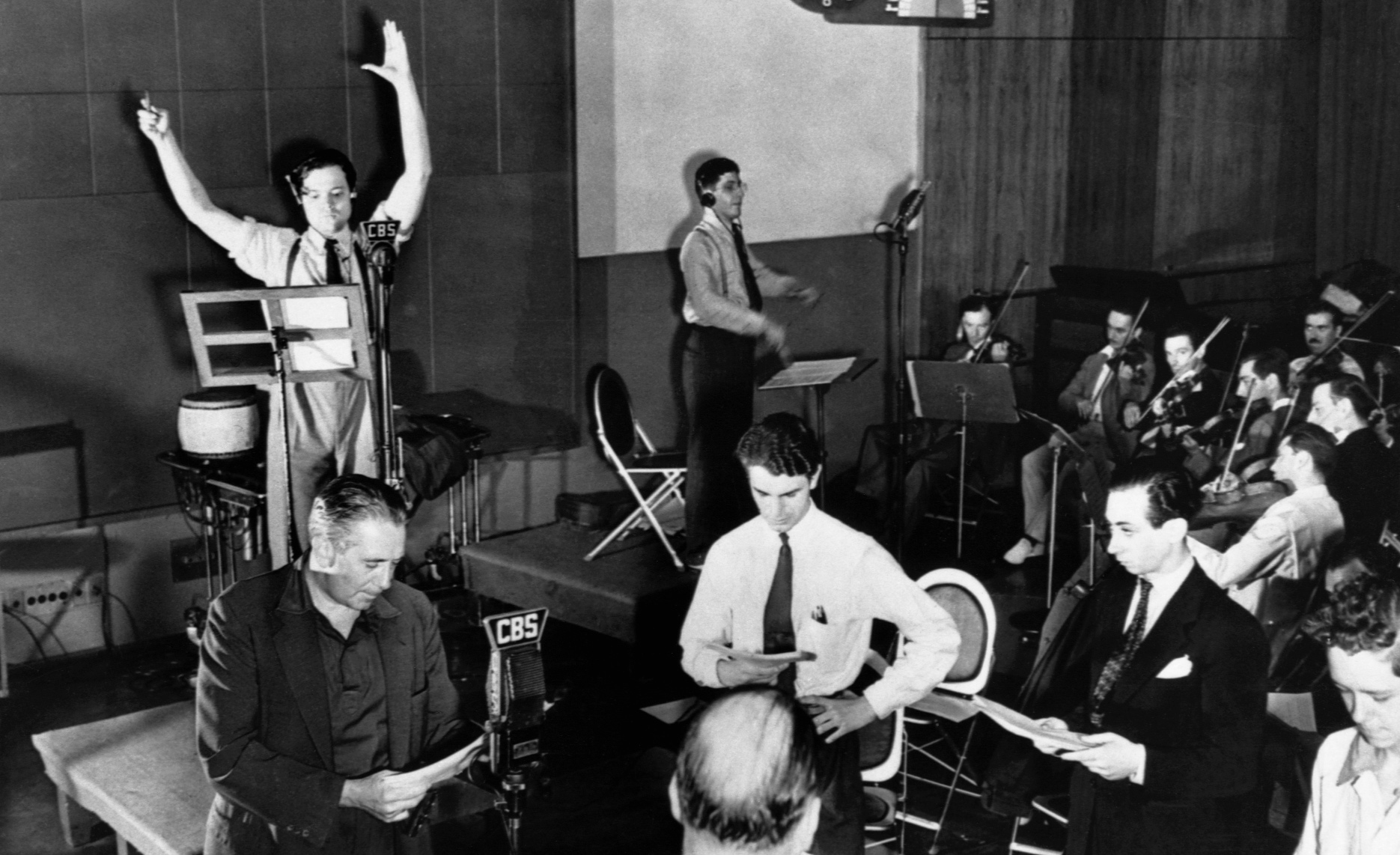
Orson Welles, arms upraised, directs a rehearsal of CBS Radio's The Mercury Theatre on the Air. Bernard Herrmann conducts the CBS Radio orchestra; actors at the microphone include Ray Collins and Richard Wilson.

After the theatrical successes of the Mercury Theatre, CBS Radio invited Orson Welles to create a summer show for 13 weeks. The series began July 11, 1938,

Orson Welles presented a special challenge to the CBS sound effects team, The New Yorker reported. "His programs called for all sorts of unheard-of effects, and he could be satisfied with nothing short of perfection." For the first episode, "Dracula", the sound team searched for the perfect sound of a stake being driven through the heart of the vampire. They first presented a savoy cabbage and a sharpened broomstick for Welles's approval. "Much too leafy," Welles concluded. "Drill a hole in the cabbage and fill it with water. We need blood." When that sound experiment also failed to satisfy Welles, he considered awhile—and asked for a watermelon. The New Yorker recalled the effect:

Welles stepped from the control booth, seized a hammer, and took a crack at the melon. Even the studio audience shuddered at the sound. That night, on a coast-to-coast network, he gave millions of listeners nightmares with what, even though it be produced with a melon and hammer, is indubitably the sound a stake would make piercing the heart of an undead body.

As the Mercury's second theatre season began in 1938, Welles and John Houseman were unable to write the Mercury Theatre on the Air broadcasts on their own. For "Hell on Ice" (October 8, 1938), the 14th episode of the series, they hired Howard E. Koch, whose experience in having a play performed by the Federal Theatre Project in Chicago led him to leave his law practice and move to New York to become a writer. The Mercury Theatre on the Air was a sustaining show underwritten by CBS, so in lieu of a more substantial salary Houseman gave Koch the rights to any script he worked on—including, to his literal good fortune, "The War of the Worlds". After five months Koch left the show for Hollywood; his last script was "The Glass Key" (March 10, 1939), by which time The Mercury Theatre on the Air was called The Campbell Playhouse.

== Episodes ==
No.	Title	Original release date
1	"Dracula"	July 11, 1938
Adapted from the novel by Bram Stoker; Cast: Orson Welles (Dr. John Seward, Count Dracula), Elizabeth Farrell (Lucy Westenra), George Coulouris (Jonathan Harker), Agnes Moorehead (Mina Harker), Martin Gabel (Dr. Van Helsing), Ray Collins (Russian Captain), Karl Swenson (Mate)
2	"Treasure Island"	July 18, 1938
Adapted from the novel by Robert Louis Stevenson; Cast: Orson Welles (adult Jim Hawkins, Long John Silver), Arthur Anderson (Jim Hawkins), George Coulouris (Captain Smollett), Ray Collins (Ben Gunn), Agnes Moorehead (Mrs. Hawkins), Eustace Wyatt (Squire Trelawney), Alfred Shirley (Blind Pew); with William Alland, Stephen Fox, Richard Wilson
3	"A Tale of Two Cities"	July 25, 1938
Adapted from the novel by Charles Dickens; Cast: Orson Welles (Dr. Alexandre Manette, Sydney Carton), Mary Taylor (Lucie Manette), Eustace Wyatt (Clerk), Edgar Barrier (Charles Darnay), Martin Gabel (Mr. Jarvis Lorry), Frank Readick (Ernest Defarge), Betty Garde (Madame Defarge), Erskine Sanford (the President), Ray Collins (Prosecutor), Kenneth Delmar (Counselor for the Defense)
4	"The Thirty-Nine Steps"	August 1, 1938
Adapted from the novel by John Buchan; Orson Welles (Richard Hannay, Marmaduke Jopley)
5	"I'm a Fool" "The Open Window" "My Little Boy"	August 8, 1938
Adaptations of three short stories Orson Welles, Edgar Barrier and William Alland perform "I'm a Fool" by Sherwood Anderson. Ray Collins, Brenda Forbes and Virginia Welles (as Anna Stafford) perform "The Open Window" by Saki. Betty Garde, Kingsley Colton, Estelle Levy and Orson Welles perform "My Little Boy" by Carl Ewald.
6	"Abraham Lincoln"	August 15, 1938
Adapted from the play by John Drinkwater, supplemented by excerpts from Lincoln's speeches and letters Cast: Orson Welles (Abraham Lincoln), Ray Collins (Grant), Edward Jerome (General Lee), George Coulouris (Hook), Joseph Cotten (Seward), Carl Frank (Scott), Karl Swenson (Hay), William Alland (Dennis) and Agnes Moorehead (Mrs. Lincoln)
7	"The Affairs of Anatol"	August 22, 1938
Adapted from the play by Arthur Schnitzler; Cast: Orson Welles, Alice Frost, Arlene Francis, Helen Lewis, Ray Collins
8	"The Count of Monte Cristo"	August 29, 1938
Adapted from the novel by Alexandre Dumas; Cast: Orson Welles (Edmond Dantès), Ray Collins (Abbé Faria), George Coulouris (Monsieur Morrel), Edgar Barrier (de Villefort), Eustace Wyatt (Caderousse), Paul Stewart (Paul Dantés) Sidney Smith (Mondego), Richard Wilson (the Officer), Virginia Welles, as Anna Stafford (Mercédès), William Alland (Merchant)
9	"The Man Who Was Thursday"	September 5, 1938
Adapted from the novel by G. K. Chesterton; Cast: Orson Welles (Gabriel Syme), Eustace Wyatt (President Sunday), Ray Collins (the Professor), George Coulouis (Mr. Lucian Gregory), Edgar Barrier (the Marquis), Paul Stewart (Gogol), Joseph Cotten (Dr. Bull), Erskine Sanford (Secretary), Alan Devitt (Witherspoon), Virginia Welles, as Anna Stafford (Rosamond)
10	"Julius Caesar"	September 11, 1938
Adapted from the Mercury Theatre's stage triumph Cast: Orson Welles (Brutus), H. V. Kaltenborn (Commentator), Martin Gabel (Cassius), George Coulouris (Antony), Joseph Holland (Caesar); music by Marc Blitzstein
11	"Jane Eyre"	September 18, 1938
Adapted from the novel by Charlotte Brontë; Music by Bernard Herrmann; Welles used the disc to prepare the 1943 film in which he starred, and the acetate original was irreparably damaged.
12	"The Immortal Sherlock Holmes"	September 25, 1938
Adapted from the play by William Gillette; Cast: Orson Welles (Sherlock Holmes), Ray Collins (Dr. Watson), Mary Taylor (Alice Faulkner), Brenda Forbes (Madge Larrabee), Edgar Barrier (James Larrabee), Morgan Farley (Inspector Forman), Richard Wilson (Jim Craigin), Eustace Wyatt (Professor Moriarty)
13	"Oliver Twist"	October 2, 1938
Adapted from the novel by Charles Dickens; Cast: Orson Welles (Fagin), others
14	"Hell on Ice"	October 9, 1938
Adapted from the book by Edward Ellsberg; Cast: Orson Welles, Al Swenson, Bud Collyer, Dan Seymour (announcer), Frank Readick, Howard Smith, Joseph Cotten, Ray Collins, Thelma Schnee, William Alland, Bernard Herrmann (composer, conductor), Davidson Taylor (production supervisor)
15	"Seventeen"	October 16, 1938
Adapted from the novel by Booth Tarkington; Cast: Orson Welles (William Sylvanus Baxter), Betty Garde (Mrs. Baxter), Ray Collins (Mr. Parcher), Mary Wickes (Mrs. Parcher), Joseph Cotten (Genesis), Ruth Ford (Lola Pratt, the Baby Talk Girl), Marilyn Erskine (Jane), Elliott Reid (Cousin George), Pattee Chapmen (Rannie), Morgan Farley (Joe Bullitt)
16	"Around the World in Eighty Days"	October 23, 1938
Adapted from the novel by Jules Verne; Cast: Orson Welles (Phileas Fogg), Ray Collins (Mr. Fix), Edgar Barrier (Passepartout), Eustace Wyatt (Ralph), Frank Readick (Stuart), Arlene Francis (Princess Aouda), Stefan Schnabel (Parsee), Al Swenson (the Captain), William Alland (the Officer)
17	"The War of the Worlds"	October 30, 1938
Adapted from the novel by H. G. Wells; Cast: Orson Welles (producer, director, host, performer: Professor Richard Pierson), Dan Seymour (announcer), Paul Stewart (associate producer, adaptor, performer: Studio announcer, Third Studio Announcer), Frank Readick (Reporter Carl Phillips, Radio operator 2X2L), Kenny Delmar (Policeman at farm, Captain Lansing, Secretary of the Interior, Bayonne radio operator), Ray Collins (Farmer Wilmuth, Harry McDonald the radio VP, Rooftop radio announcer), Carl Frank (Second studio announcer, Fascist stranger), Richard Wilson (Brig. General Montgomery Smith, Officer 22nd Field Artillery, Langham Field), William Alland (Meridian room announcer, Field artillery gunner), Stefan Schnabel (Field artillery observer), William Herz (Newark radio operator, Radio operator 8X3R), Howard Smith (Bomber Lt. Voght), Bernard Herrmann (composer, conductor), John Houseman (producer, adaptor, script editor), Howard Koch (adaptor), Davidson Taylor (production supervisor), Ora Nichols (sound effects), Ray Kremer (sound effects), Jim Rogan (sound effects), John Dietz (sound engineer)
18	"Heart of Darkness" "Life With Father"	November 6, 1938
Adaptation of the novella Heart of Darkness by Joseph Conrad, with the following cast: Orson Welles (Author, Ernest Kurtz), Ray Collins (Marlow), Alfred Shirley (Accountant), George Coulouris (Assistant Manager), Edgar Barrier (Second Manager), William Alland (Agent), Virginia Welles, as Anna Stafford (Kurtz's Intended Bride), Frank Readick (Tchiatosov); Adaptation of the play Life With Father by Clarence Day, with the following cast: Orson Welles (Father), Mildred Natwick (Mother), Mary Wickes (Employment Office Manager), Alice Frost (Margaret), Arthur Anderson (young Clarence Day)
19	"A Passenger to Bali"	November 13, 1938
Adapted by Ellis St. Joseph from his own short novel Cast: Orson Welles (Reverend Dr. Ralph Walkes), George Coulouris (Capt. English), Frank Readick (Mr. Stagg), Eustace Wyatt (Mr. Wrangle), Ray Collins (Van Matsys), Alfred Shirley (Mr. Chisholm)
20	"The Pickwick Papers"	November 20, 1938
Adapted from the novel by Charles Dickens; Cast: Orson Welles (Sergeant Buzzfuzz, Mr. Jingle), Ray Collins (Samuel Pickwick), Alfred Shirley (Augustus Snodgrass), Frank Readick, Elliott Reid, Edgar Barrier, Eustace Wyatt, Brenda Forbes, others
21	"Clarence"	November 27, 1938
Adapted from the novel by Booth Tarkington; Cast: Orson Welles (Clarence), others
22	"The Bridge of San Luis Rey"	December 4, 1938
Adapted from the novel by Thornton Wilder

== Awards ==
The Mercury Theatre on the Air was inducted into the National Radio Hall of Fame in 1988.

== See also ==
- The Campbell Playhouse
