= Howard Smith (actor) =

American actor (1893–1968)

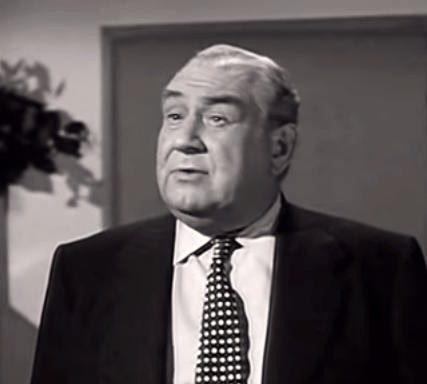
- Born: Howard Irving Smith; August 12, 1893; Attleboro, Massachusetts, U.S.
- Died: January 10, 1968 (aged 74); Hollywood, California, U.S.
- Other name: Howard I. Smith
- Occupation: Actor
- Years active: 1918–1967
- Spouse(s): Lillian Boardman (m. 19??; died 1953)

Howard Irving Smith (August 12, 1893 – January 10, 1968) was an American character actor with a 50-year career in vaudeville, theatre, radio, films, and television. In 1938, he performed in Orson Welles's short-lived stage production and once-lost film, Too Much Johnson, and in the celebrated radio production, "The War of the Worlds". He portrayed Charley in the original Broadway production of Death of a Salesman and recreated the role in the 1951 film version. On television, Smith portrayed the gruff Harvey Griffin in the situation comedy, Hazel.

== Biography ==
Howard Irving Smith was born August 12, 1893, in Attleboro, Massachusetts, to parents George H. Smith and Sybelle Pollard Smith.

Smith began as a concert singer, but his hopes of an opera career were ended after his service in the 77th Infantry Division in World War I. Enrico Caruso suggested that he try a musical act in vaudeville. He formed a team with his friend Harry Meeker, and later as a comedian, he shared bills with Frank Fay, Sophie Tucker, James Barton, and Bessie Clayton.

In 1928, with big-time vaudeville ending, Smith landed a job on radio's popular The Collier Hour, and received $35 for three minutes work. His radio career continued with The March of Time, Cavalcade of America, Forty Minutes in Hollywood and Crime Doctor. Smith created the role of Sergeant Velie in The Adventures of Ellery Queen. He played the role of Will Brown, Homer's father, on radio's The Aldrich Family and later reprised the role on the NBC television series.

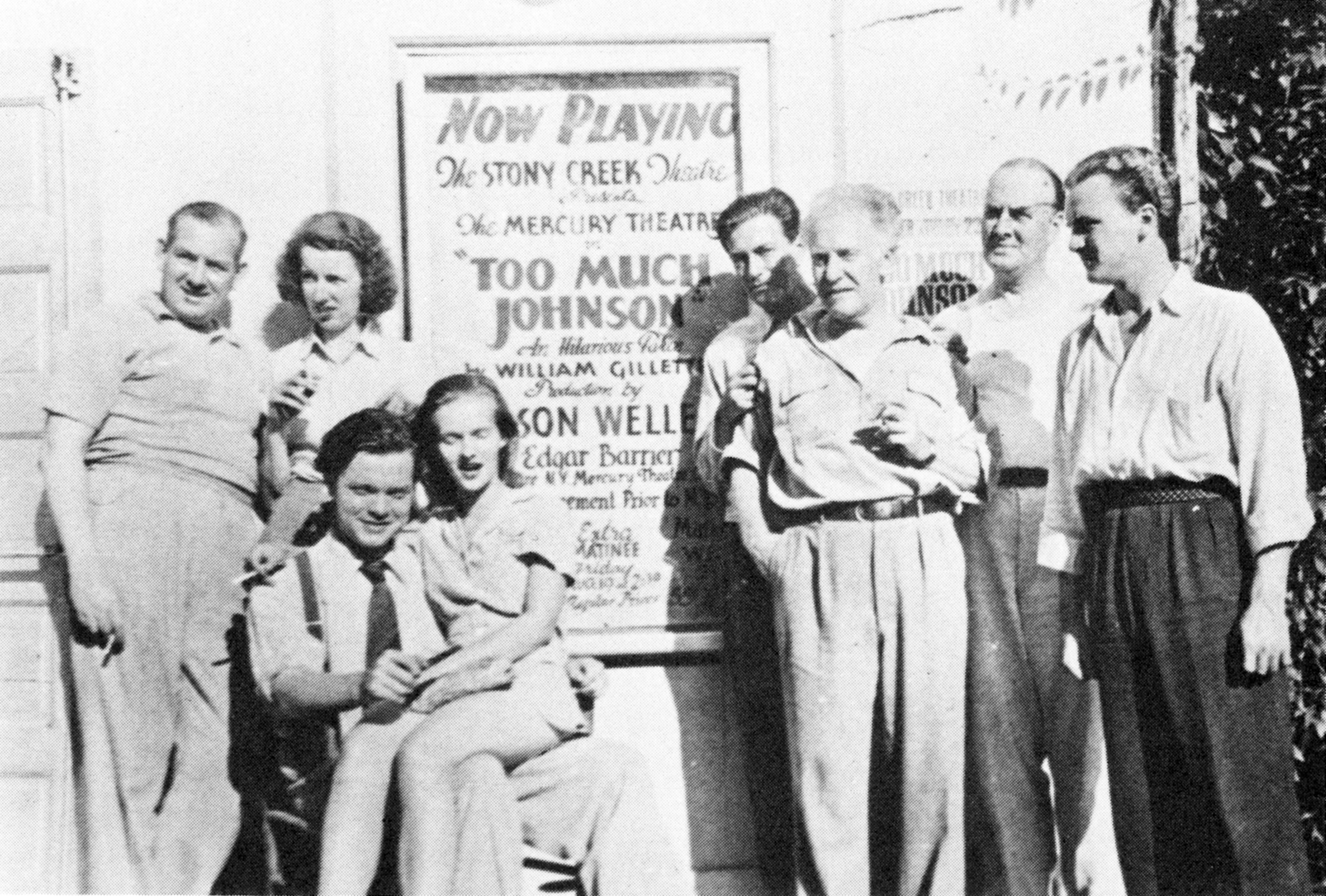
Howard Smith, Mary Wickes, Orson Welles, Virginia Nicolson, William Herz, Erskine Sanford, Eustace Wyatt, and Joseph Cotten outside the Stony Creek Theatre during the two-week run of the Mercury Theatre stage production of Too Much Johnson (August 16–29, 1938)

A member of the repertory company of Orson Welles's CBS Radio series The Mercury Theatre on the Air and The Campbell Playhouse, Smith played the role of the ill-fated bomber commander in the 1938 production of "The War of the Worlds". Smith appears as Cuban plantation owner Joseph Johnson in Welles's rediscovered film Too Much Johnson — slapstick sequences that were to be integrated into a theatre production that was briefly staged in August 1938 before it was shelved.

After New York stage appearances in Solitaire, Decision, and Dear Ruth, Smith created the role of Charley in the original Broadway production of Death of a Salesman. He may be best remembered for his recreation of the role in the 1951 screen version.

His other film credits include Kiss of Death, Call Northside 777, The Street with No Name, State of the Union, A Face in the Crowd, and No Time for Sergeants. He made his film debut in 1918, in Young America.

On television, Smith played the overbearing boss Oliver Misrell in The Twilight Zone first-season episode, "A Stop at Willoughby" (1960), and also appeared in the 1962 episode, "Cavender Is Coming". In 1962, he was cast in the Perry Mason season-six episode, "The Case of the Unsuitable Uncle", as character Frank Warden.

He was regularly featured on the 1960s TV series Hazel, as George Baxter's gruff client Harvey "Harv" Griffin.

His wife, actress and singer Lillian Boardman, died in 1953. Smith died January 10, 1968, in Hollywood, following a heart attack. He was cremated and his ashes are buried at Kensico Cemetery in Valhalla, New York.

== Partial filmography ==
- Young America (1918) as Jack Doray
- Too Much Johnson (1938) – Joseph Johnson
- Her Kind of Man (1946) – Bill Fellows
- Kiss of Death (1947) – Warden
- Call Northside 777 (1948) – K.L. Palmer
- State of the Union (1948) – Sam I. Parrish
- The Street with No Name (1948) – Commissioner Ralph Demory
- Cry Murder (1950) – Senator Alden
- Death of a Salesman (1951) – Charley
- Never Wave at a WAC (1953) – Major General Prentiss (uncredited)
- The Caddy (1953) – Golf Official
- The Court-Martial of Billy Mitchell (1955) – Committee Chairman (uncredited)
- A Face in the Crowd (1957) – J.B. Jeffries
- Don't Go Near the Water (1957) – Admiral Junius Boatwright
- No Time for Sergeants (1958) – Major General Eugene Bush
- I Bury the Living (1958) – George Kraft
- Wind Across the Everglades (1958) – George Leggett
- Alfred Hitchcock Presents (1959) (Season 4 Episode 13: "Six People, No Music") - Stanton C. Barryvale
- Face of Fire (1959) – Sheriff Nolan
- Murder, Inc. (1960) – Albert Anastasia
- New Comedy Showcase (1960, TV series, Episode "The Trouble with Richard") – Harold Martin
- The Tom Ewell Show (1960, TV series) – Warren Prescott
- The Twilight Zone (1960–1962, TV Series) – Polk / Misrell
- Hazel (1961–1965, TV Series) – Harvey Griffin
- Bon Voyage! (1962) – Judge Henderson
- The Dakotas (1963, TV Series) – Ed Turner
- The Brass Bottle (1964) – Senator Grindle
- Vacation Playhouse (1964, TV Series) – T.J. Gittings
- Green Acres (1966) – Judge Clemens
- The John Forsythe Show (1966, TV Series) – Oakes
- The Mystery of the Chinese Junk (1967, TV Series) – Cummings
- Bewitched (1967, TV Series) – C.L. Morton
- The Hardy Boys: The Mystery of the Chinese Junk (1967) – Cummings (final film role)
