= Too Much Johnson (1938 film) =

1938 film by Orson Welles

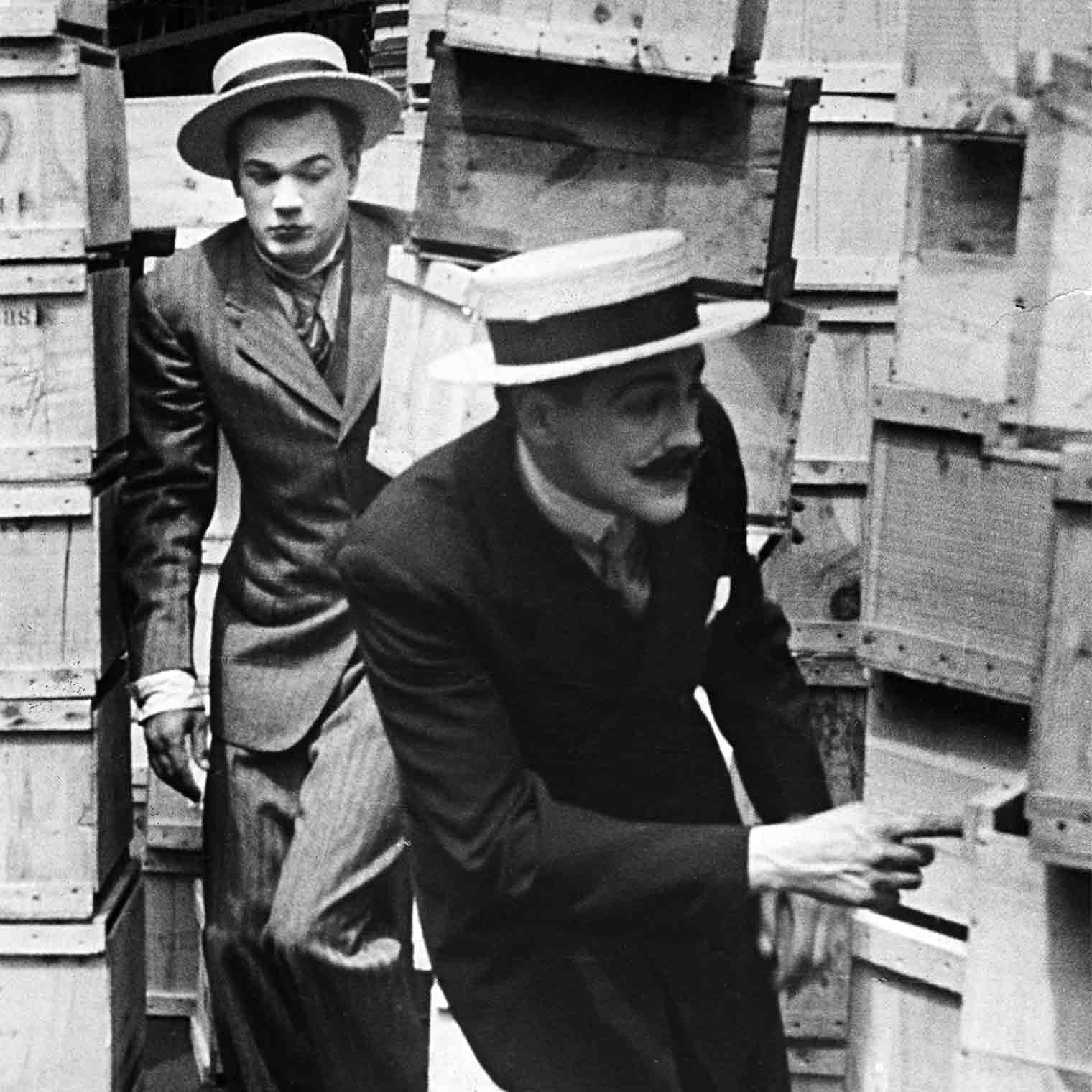
- Joseph Cotten and Edgar Barrier in Too Much Johnson (1938)
- Directed by: Orson Welles
- Screenplay by: Orson Welles
- Based on: Too Much Johnson by William Gillette (play)
- Produced by: John Houseman; Orson Welles
- Starring: Joseph Cotten; Virginia Nicolson; Edgar Barrier; Arlene Francis
- Cinematography: Paul Dunham
- Edited by: William Alland; Orson Welles; Richard Wilson
- Music by: Paul Bowles (Music for a Farce)
- Production company: Mercury Theatre
- Release date: 1938
- Running time: 66 minutes
- Country: United States
- Language: silent
- Budget: $10,000

Too Much Johnson is a 1938 American silent comedy film written and directed by Orson Welles. An unfinished film component of a stage production, it was made three years before Welles directed Citizen Kane, but it was never publicly screened. It was shot to be integrated into Welles's Mercury Theatre stage presentation of William Gillette's 1894 comedy, but the film sequences could not be shown due to the absence of projection facilities at the venue, the Stony Creek Theatre in Connecticut. The resulting plot confusion reportedly contributed to the stage production's failure.

The film was believed to be lost, but in 2008 a print was discovered in a warehouse in Pordenone, Italy. The film premiered on October 9, 2013, at the Pordenone Silent Film Festival. In 2014, the work print and a modern edit of the film were made available online by the National Film Preservation Foundation.

Two previous films had been made of this play, a short film in 1900 and a feature-length Paramount film in 1919 starring Lois Wilson and Bryant Washburn. Both of these films are now lost.

== Plot ==
Madcap comedy about a woman with two lovers, one of whom finds out about the other and poses as a villain in an unstoppable chase to corner him.

== Cast ==
- Joseph Cotten as Augustus Billings
- Virginia Nicolson as Lenore Faddish
- Edgar Barrier as Leon Dathis
- Arlene Francis as Mrs. Dathis
- Ruth Ford as Mrs. Billings
- Howard Smith as Joseph Johnson
- Mary Wickes as Mrs. Battison
- Eustace Wyatt as Faddish
- Guy Kingsley as MacIntosh
- George Duthie as Purser
- John Houseman as Keystone Cop and Duelist
- Herbert Drake as Keystone Cop

== Production ==
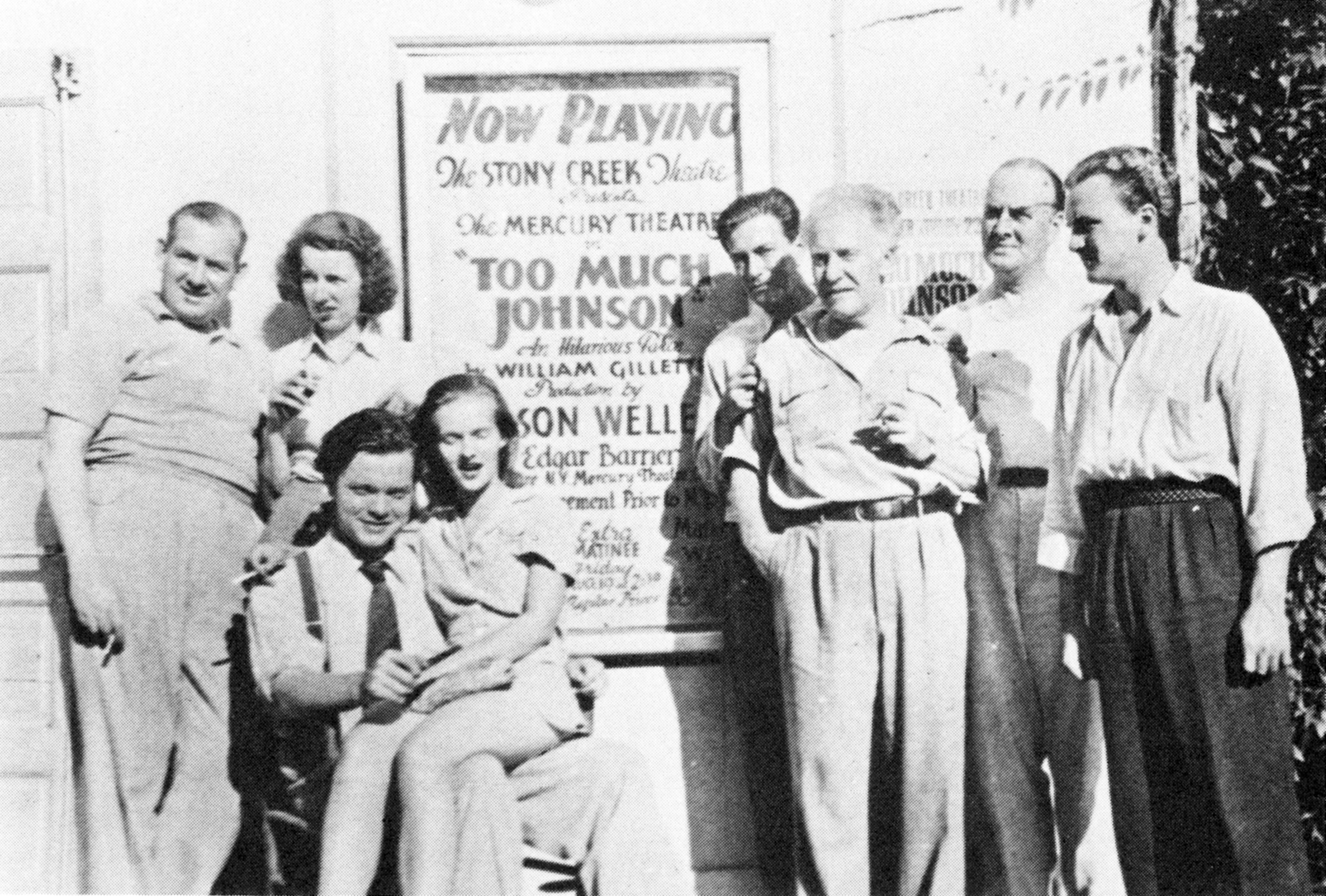
Howard Smith, Mary Wickes, Orson Welles, Virginia Nicolson, William Herz, Erskine Sanford, Eustace Wyatt and Joseph Cotten outside the Stony Creek Theatre during the two-week run of the Mercury Theatre stage production of Too Much Johnson (August 16–29, 1938)

The film was not intended to stand by itself, but was designed as the cinematic aspect of Welles's Mercury Theatre stage presentation of William Gillette's 1894 comedy about a New York playboy who flees from the violent husband of his mistress and borrows the identity of a plantation owner in Cuba who is expecting the arrival of a mail-order bride.

Welles planned to mix live action and film for this production. The film was designed to run 40 minutes, with 20 minutes devoted to the play's prologue and two 10-minute introductions for the second and third act. Welles planned to create a silent film in the tradition of the Mack Sennett slapstick comedies, in order to enhance the various chases, duels and comic conflicts of the Gillette play.

"The multi-media concept was a throwback to the early age of cinema when vaudeville shows were punctuated by quick cinematic vignettes," wrote Welles biographer Bret Wood. The alternation format stage-and-screen hybrid—scenes of live performance linked together by film segments—dates back to 1896.

Welles thought highly of Joseph Cotten as a comic actor, and cast him as the lead in the farce. Other Mercury Theatre actors included Ruth Ford, Arlene Francis, Howard Smith, Mary Wickes and Eustace Wyatt. Welles's wife, Virginia Nicolson, appeared in the film under her professional pseudonym Anna Stafford. Bit parts were given to Welles's Mercury Theatre producer John Houseman, assistant director John Berry, composer Marc Blitzstein, and Herbert Drake, the New York Herald Tribune drama reporter who became the Mercury Theatre's publicist and, later, vice president. Although writer Frank Brady reported that Welles gave himself a small role as a Keystone Cop, Welles is not seen in the film. Among the uncredited extras for a crowd sequence was a young Judy Holliday.

Harry Dunham, a newsreel and documentary cameraman who was an old friend of Paul Bowles, was the film's cinematographer. Location photography took place in New York City's Battery Park and Central Park. Additional shooting took place on a Hudson River day-trip excursion boat and at locations in Yonkers, New York, and Haverstraw, New York. Interior shots were set up at a studio in the Bronx, New York. For the Cuban plantation, Welles created a miniature structure next to a papier-mâché volcano, with store-bought tropical plants to suggest the exotic Caribbean flora.

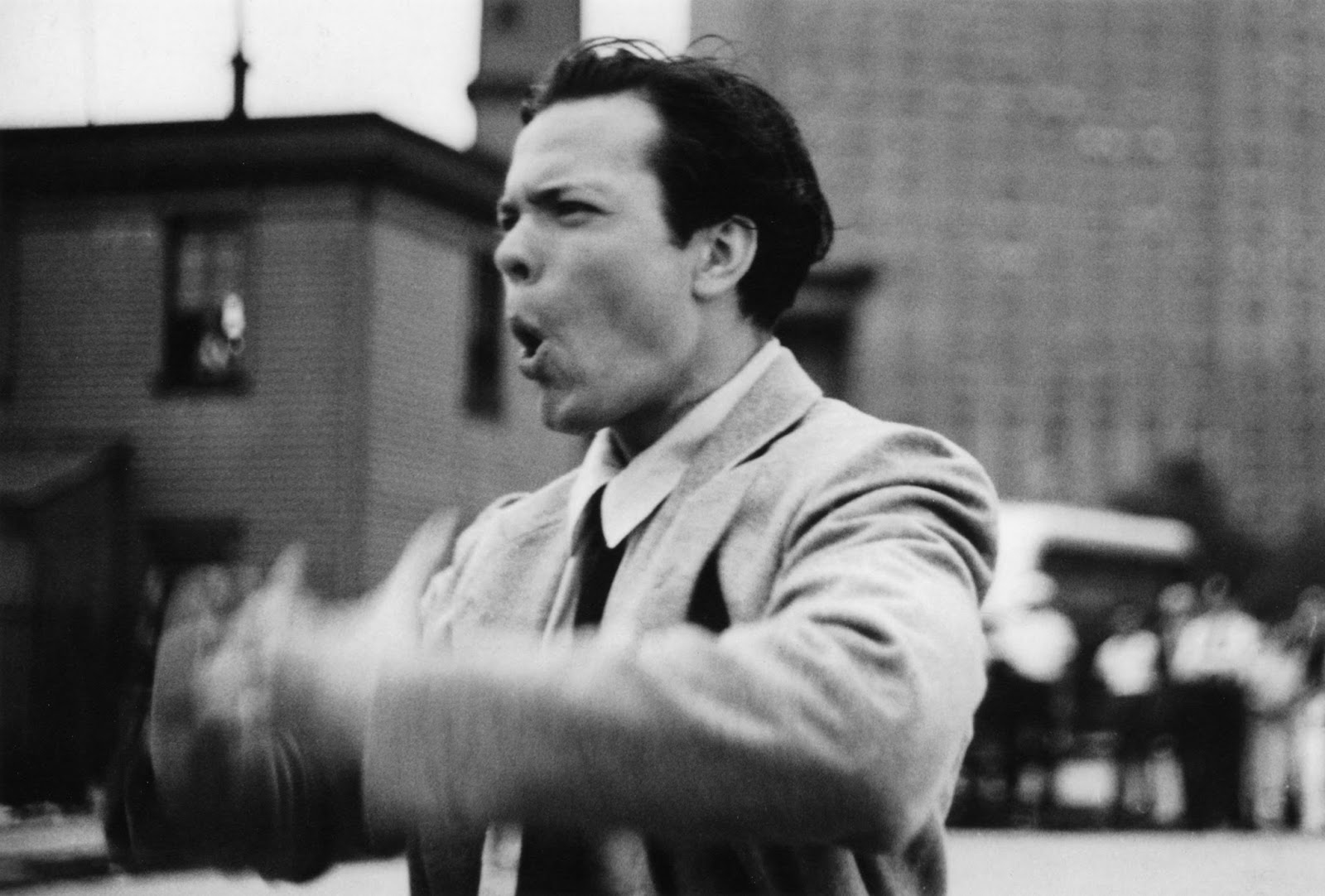
Orson Welles directing

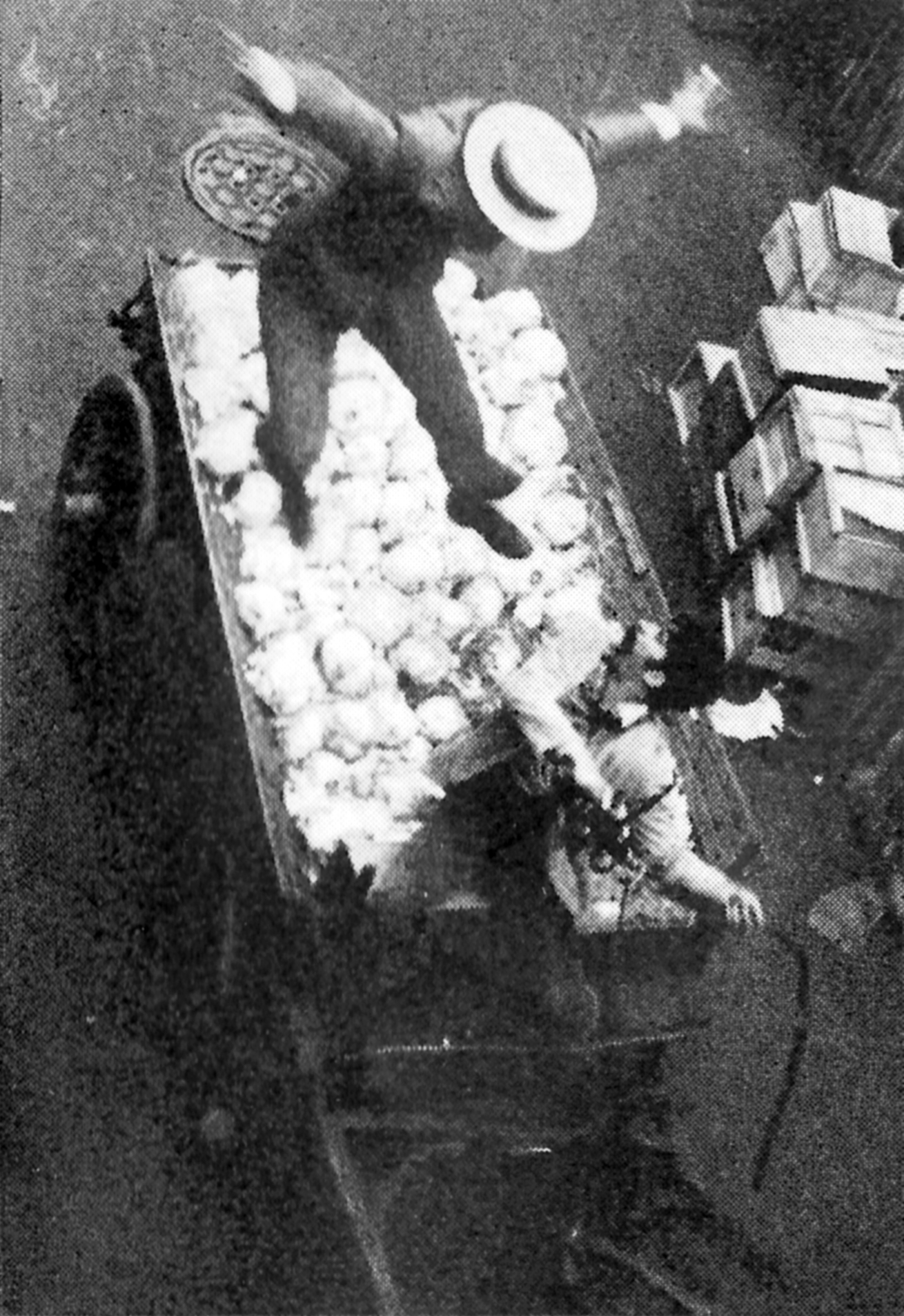
Joseph Cotten and John Berry

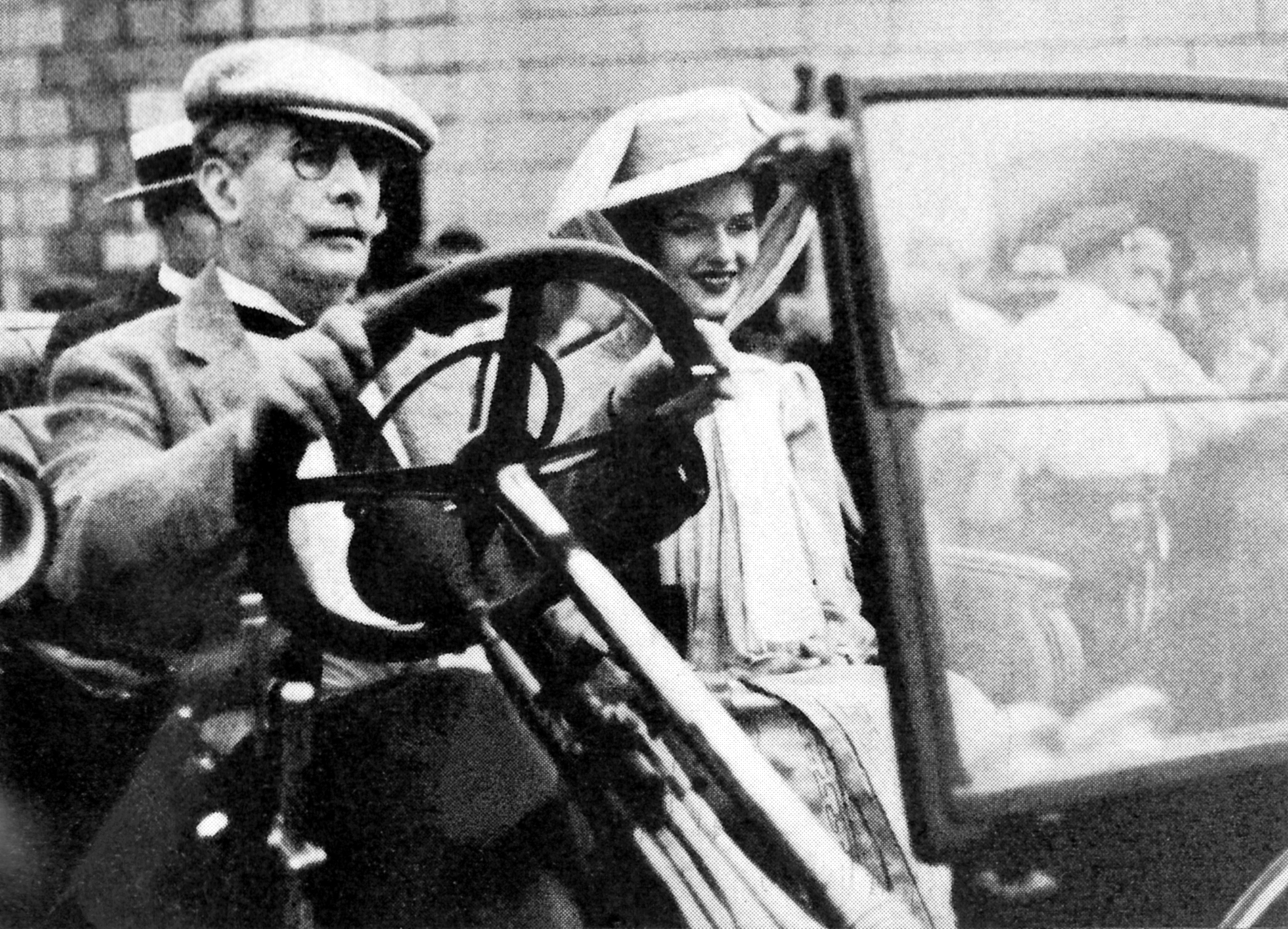
Eustace Wyatt and Virginia Welles

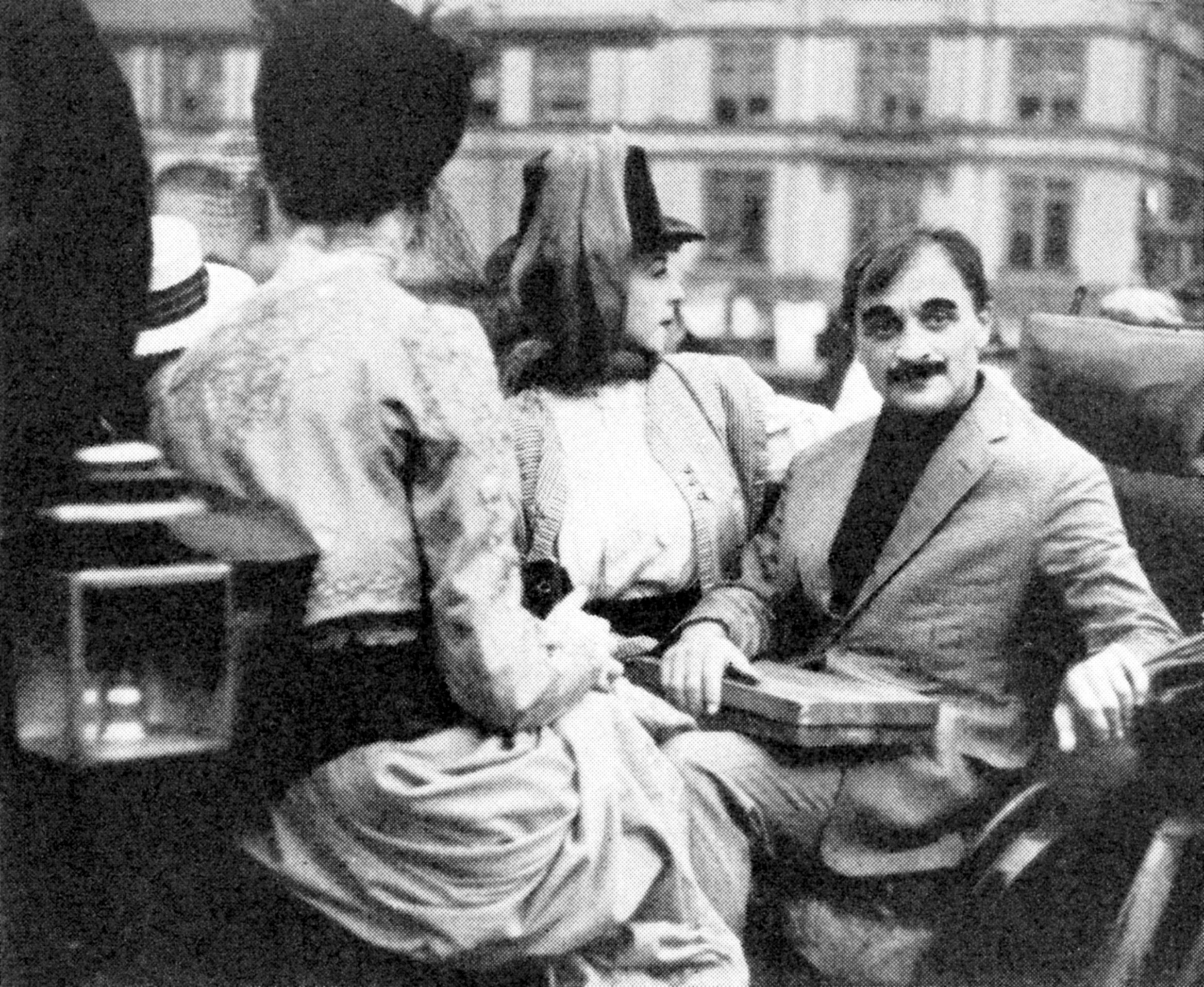
Mary Wickes, Ruth Ford and Marc Blitzstein

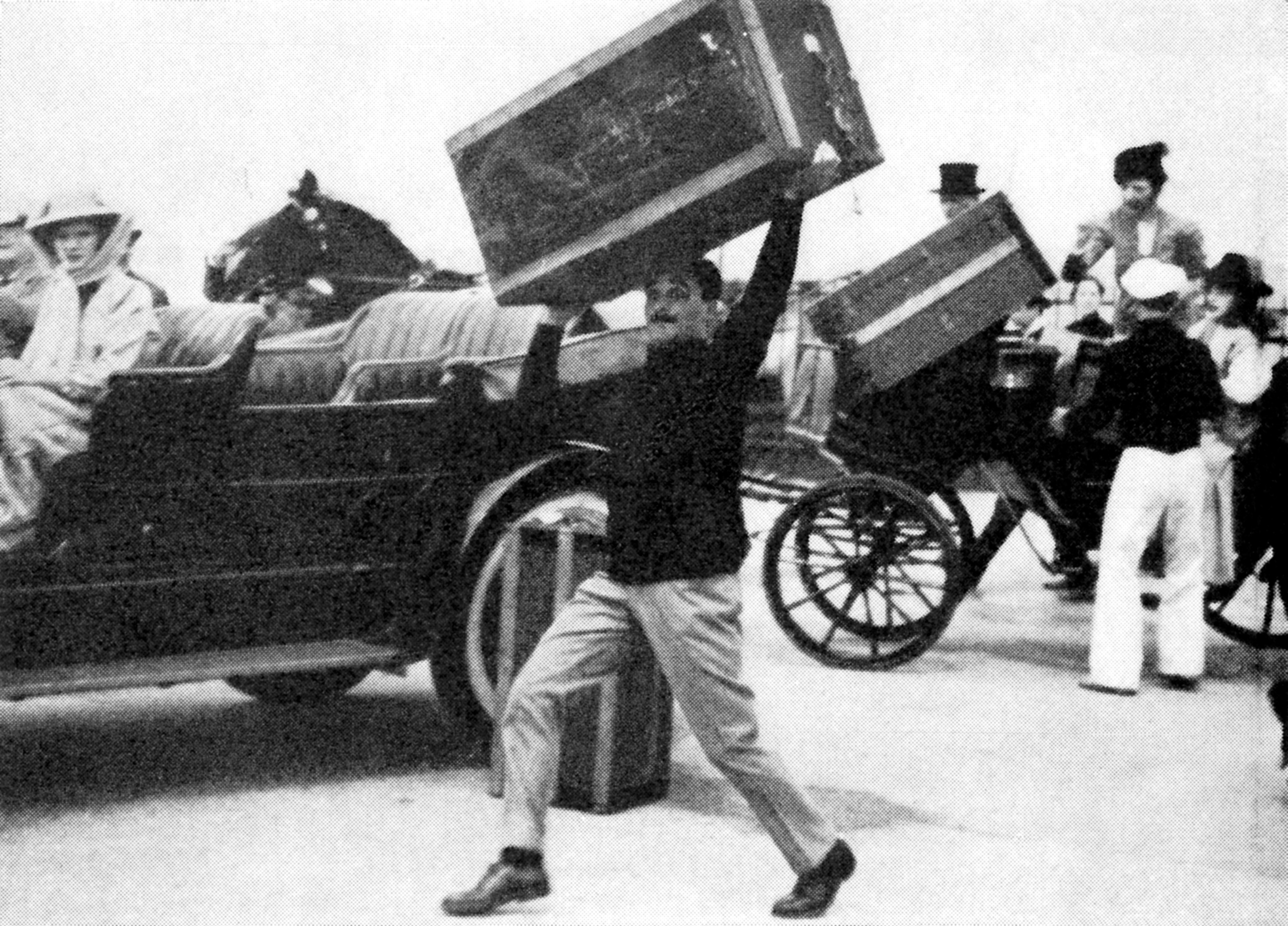
Marc Blitzstein

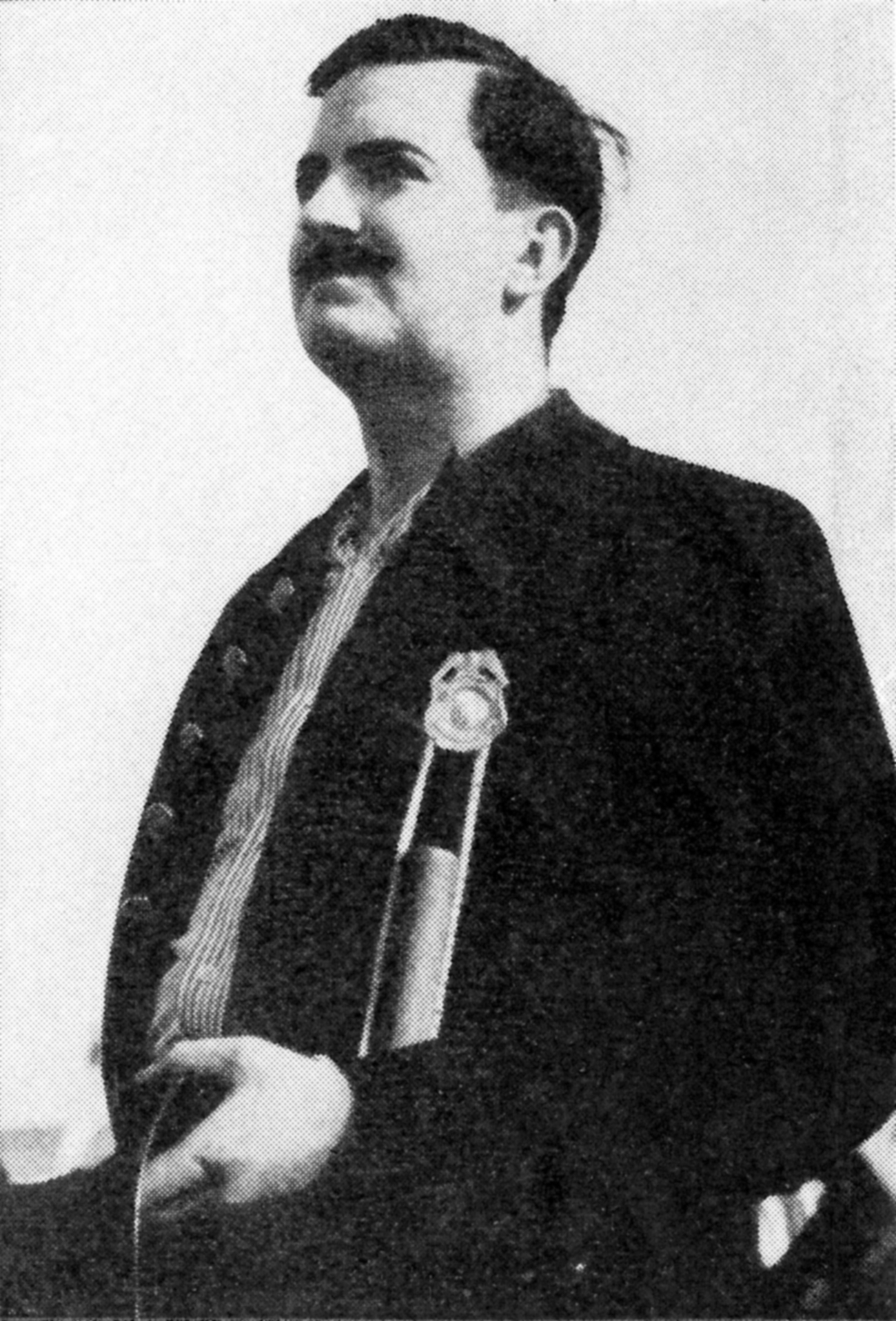
Herbert Drake as a Keystone Kop

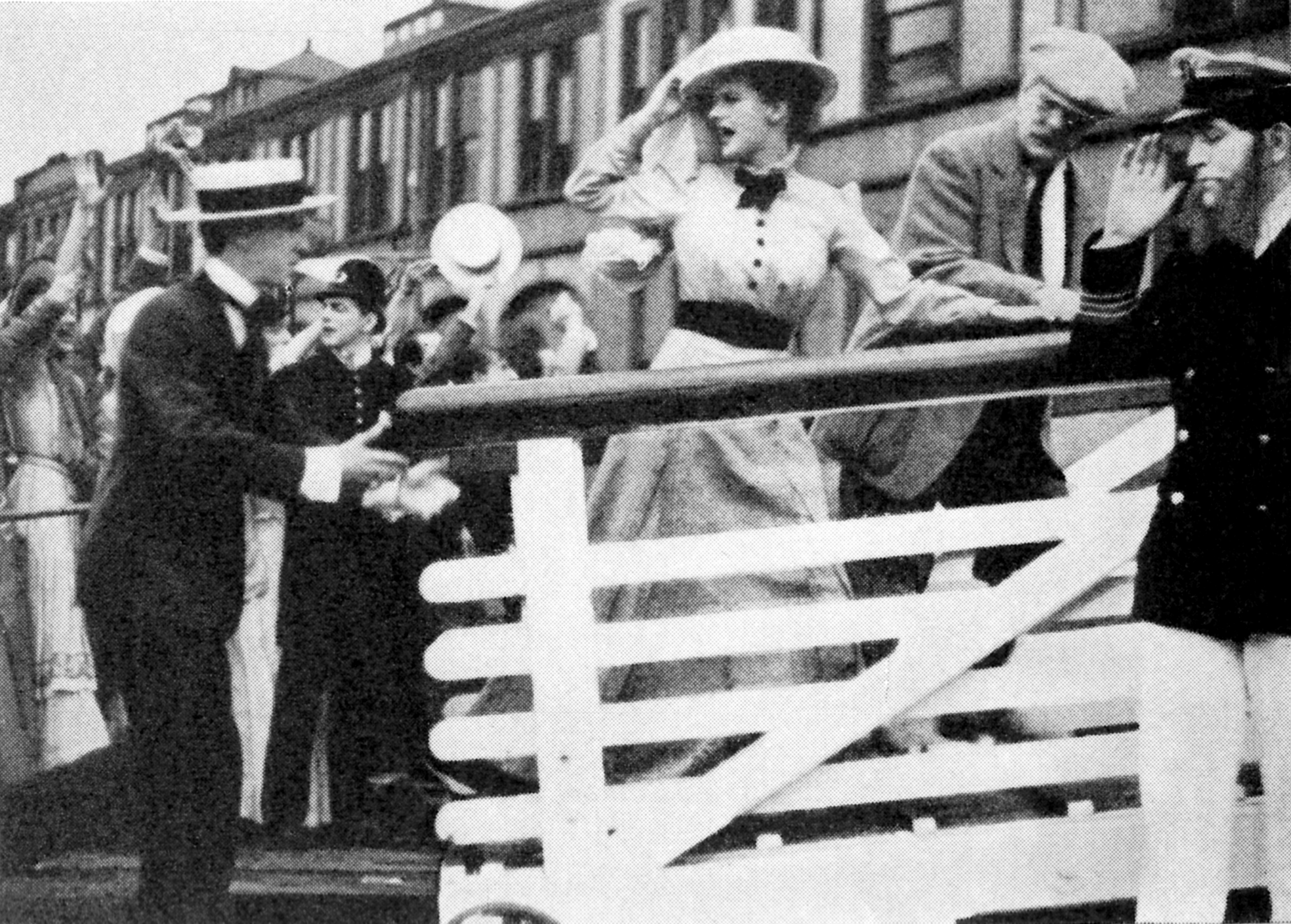
Guy Kingsley, Virginia Welles, Eustace Wyatt and George Duthie

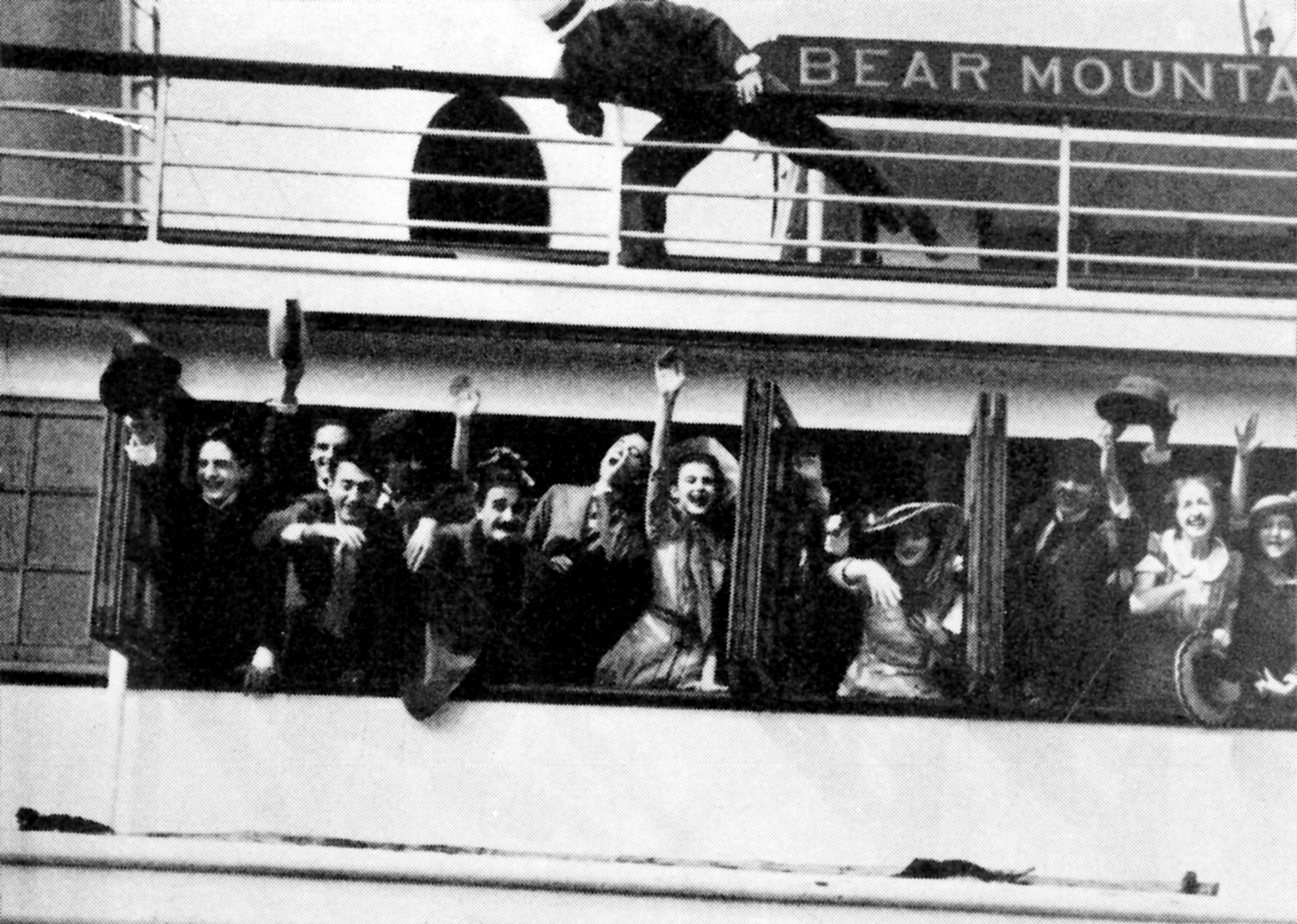
Joseph Cotten on the sailing to Cuba

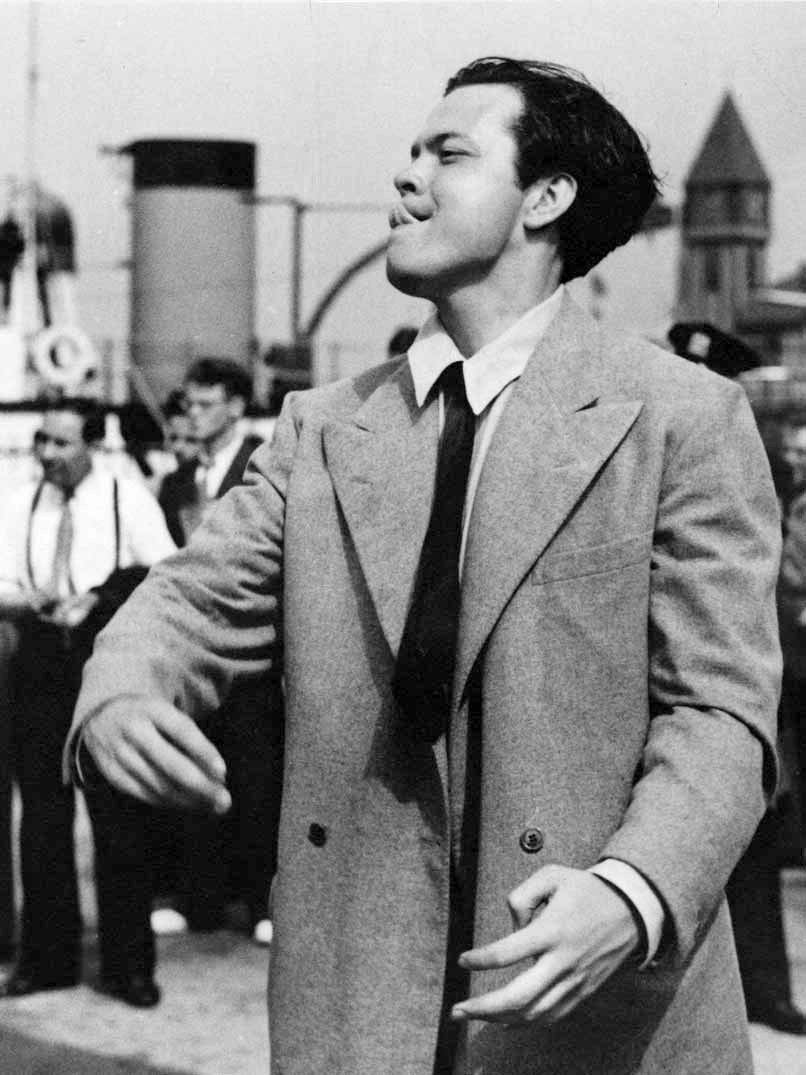
Orson Welles directing

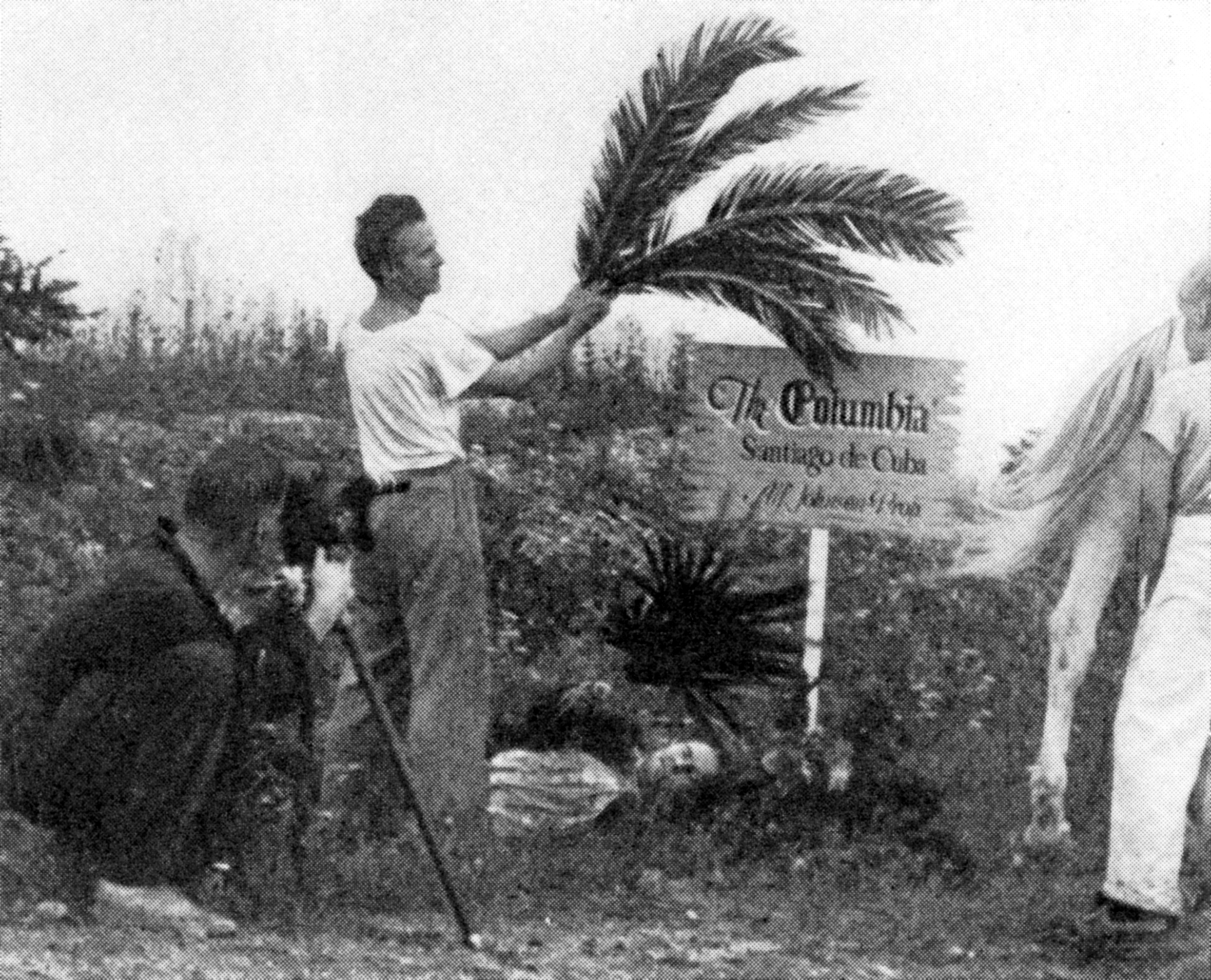
Stage manager Walter Ash and (holding the sign) John Houseman

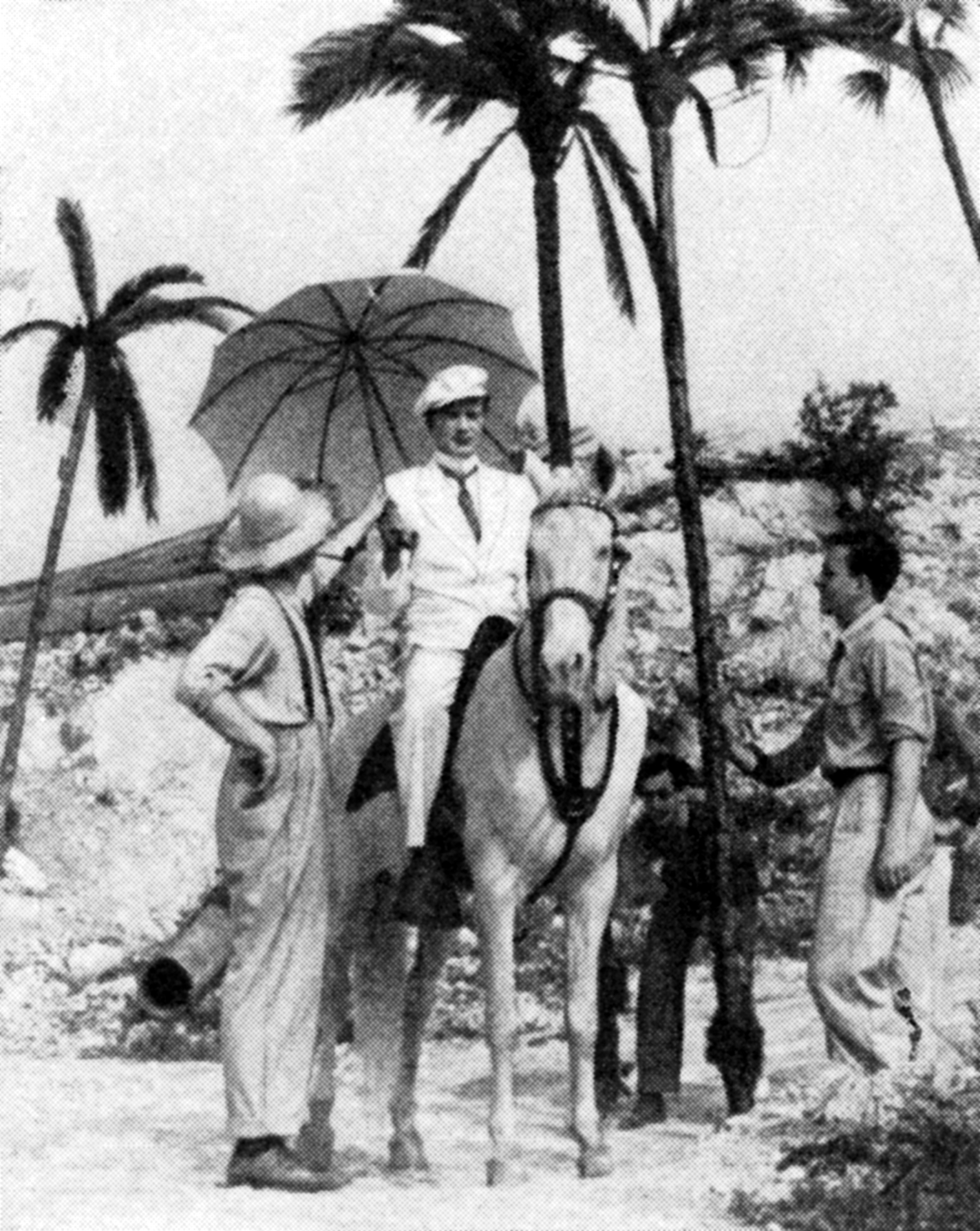
Orson Welles and Joseph Cotten

== Post-production and exhibition problems ==
Welles and his crew spent ten days shooting Too Much Johnson, which resulted in approximately 25,000 feet of film. He edited the footage on a Moviola in his suite at the St. Regis Hotel in New York City, and John Houseman later recalled visitors had to "wade knee-deep through a crackling sea of flammable [nitrate] film."

Welles was assisted by John Berry, who had been hired by the Mercury Theatre as an apprentice and extra for Caesar and worked with Welles on subsequent Mercury productions, including Too Much Johnson. Years later he recalled building the sets on a vacant lot in Yonkers, and organizing a crew that literally held them up against in the wind during filming.

"Orson had a wonderful time making the film," Berry said, reporting that Welles was so absorbed in the cutting that he took little note when the film caught fire in the projector. "What I remember, most remarkably, is me running with the projector in my hand, burning, trying to get out of the door into the goddamn hallway, and Houseman racing for the door at the same time … while Orson, with absolutely no concern whatsoever, was back inside, standing and looking at some piece of film in his hand, smoking his pipe.

During post-production, Welles ran into financial problems relating to his cast (who were not originally paid for the film shoot) and the film laboratory, which refused to deliver the processed film until it received payment. Welles also received an attorney's letter from Paramount Pictures informing him that the studio owned the film rights to Too Much Johnson, and that public presentation of his film would require payment to the studio.

Welles initially planned to present the stage-and-film mix of Too Much Johnson at the Stony Creek Theatre in Connecticut as a pre-Broadway trial run, but discovered that the theater's ceiling was too low to allow for film projection. The show opened on August 16, 1938, without the filmed sequences. Most modern sources report that audience and critical reaction to the show was poor and caused Welles to abandon the production, but a search of press coverage at the time indicates no negative published reports and no reviews from major critics. The Branford Review reported that interest in the stage production was strong as it began its second week.

== Loss and rediscovery ==
Welles never completed editing the film component for Too Much Johnson and put the footage in storage. He rediscovered it three decades later at his home outside of Madrid, Spain. "I can't remember whether I had it all along and dug it out of the bottom of a trunk, or whether someone brought it to me, but there it was", he later recalled. "I screened it, and it was in perfect condition, with not a scratch on it, as though it had only been through a projector once or twice before. It had a fine quality." Welles, however, never allowed the footage to be seen publicly, stating the film would not make sense outside of the full context of the Gillette play. In August 1970, a fire broke out at Welles's villa and the only known complete print of Too Much Johnson was destroyed.

A copy was discovered in Italy in 2008, and on August 5, 2013, the George Eastman House museum of film and photography in the U.S. announced that it had completed a long process of restoration together with Cinemazero, the National Film Preservation Foundation, and laboratory experts in the U.S. and the Netherlands. Cinema Arts, a Pennsylvania film laboratory, performed most of the preservation work. "The next step was to begin the actual photo-chemical preservation", said Tony Delgrosso, Head of Preservation at George Eastman House. "For that we turned to a lab called Cinema Arts who are world famous for the quality of their black-and-white photo-chemical preservation and restoration."

Too Much Johnson premiered October 9, 2013, at the Pordenone Silent Film Festival. The film's North American premiere was held October 16, 2013, at George Eastman House's Dryden Theatre, and the film's New York City premiere took place on November 25, 2013, at the Directors Guild of America Theater.

On August 21, 2014, the complete 66-minute work print of the film was posted online by the National Film Preservation Foundation. An edited version running about 34 minutes including intertitles, with new music composed and performed by Michael Mortilla, was also made available. "If this edit is only a guess, it strives to be an educated one," stated the foundation, "informed by research into the unpublished play scripts left behind by Welles and the Mercury Theatre company."

On February 5, 2015, Too Much Johnson was screened and performed for the very first time as a complete stage performance at the Film Forum in New York City, in association with George Eastman House, as Welles originally intended. The filmed portions were shown as prologues to the play's three acts which were performed as a staged reading by the Film Forum Players. The staged reading was directed by Allen Lewis Rickman, who adapted the play from both the Welles and Gillette versions. It was produced by Bruce Goldstein. Steve Sterner composed and performed the soundtrack for the film. The footage was re-edited by William Hohauser to fit a coherent narrative structure in conjunction with the play. Sequences already edited by Welles were left intact.

== Reception ==
Demand to see Too Much Johnson at its 2013 world premiere at the Pordenone Silent Film Festival warranted two additional showings. Reporting the "snaking queues outside the auditorium", The Guardian described the film as "a gleeful experiment in silent cinema pastiche":

And while it is a work print, not a finished film, Too Much Johnson offers breathlessly enjoyable viewing. Joseph Cotten makes a tremendous movie debut as the play's philandering lead, displaying unimagined guts and agility in a series of tumbles and leaps across Manhattan rooftops, pursued by a prancing, moustache-twirling Edgar Barrier. And Too Much Johnson is itself an affectionate romp through Keystone two-reelers, Harold Lloyd's stunt slapstick, European serials, Soviet montage and, notably, Welles's favoured steep expressionist-influenced camera angles.

Variety called the unedited footage "an unanticipated delight":

There are moments of ultra-broad comedy — Arlene Francis, looking ravishing, hams it up with evident delight at the start — yet the outdoor footage, much of it shot in the Meatpacking District and further south, is a delightful spin on slapstick chase conventions, and a dashing Joseph Cotten, in Harold Lloyd mode, demonstrates a remarkable lack of vertigo along with physical grace. Genuinely funny rather than derivative, the film as seen, complete with multiple takes, feels fresh and spirited up until the last section, when scenes meant to take place in Cuba (but shot near the Hudson, with a few rented palm trees) lose a bit of steam before the amusing final shots.

Writing for Bright Lights Film Journal, film historian Joseph McBride categorizes Too Much Johnson as Welles's pre-Hollywood filmmaking experiment,

a youthful tribute not only to the spirited tradition of exuberant low comedy but also to the past of the medium he was about to enter. Welles was always enamored of the past, though more, he said, of the mythical past we prefer to revere in fantasy than the actual messy past that was, e.g., “Merrie Old England” and “Camelot” rather than the real England of those days. He explores that theme in deeply personal ways in The Magnificent Ambersons and Chimes at Midnight, and Too Much Johnson is also reflective of his obsession with bygone times, cultural mores, and means of expression.

== See also ==
- List of rediscovered films
- Around the World (musical)
