= Edgar Barrier =

Film, radio and television actor (1907–64)

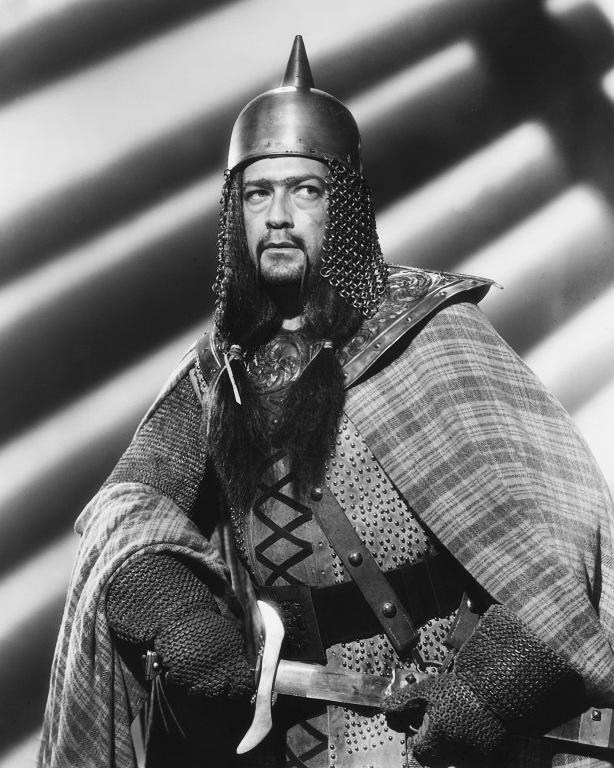
- Barrier as Banquo in Orson Welles' 1948 film version of Macbeth
- Born: March 4, 1907; New York City, U.S.
- Died: June 20, 1964 (aged 57); Hollywood, California, U.S.
- Resting place: Westwood Village Memorial Park Cemetery
- Occupation: Actor
- Years active: 1932–1964

Edgar Barrier (March 4, 1907 – June 20, 1964) was an American actor who appeared on radio, stage and screen. In the 1930s he was a member of Orson Welles' Mercury Theatre and appeared in the 1938 Welles-directed short, Too Much Johnson, which was long believed lost but was rediscovered in 2013. He was also in two films with Welles, Journey into Fear (1943) and Macbeth (1948).

== Career ==
Barrier was born in New York City and died in Hollywood from a heart attack at the age of 57. He was one of several actors who played Simon Templar on The Saint radio show and had the recurring role of Don Cornelio Esperon on a few episodes of Disney's 1957 TV series Zorro.

== Broadway roles ==
Edgar Barrier's Broadway stage credits are listed at the Internet Broadway Database.

- Mary of Scotland (1933) as Lord Douglas
- Idiot's Delight (1936) as Auguste
- The Magnificent Yankee (1946) as Mr. Justice Brandeis

== Selected filmography ==
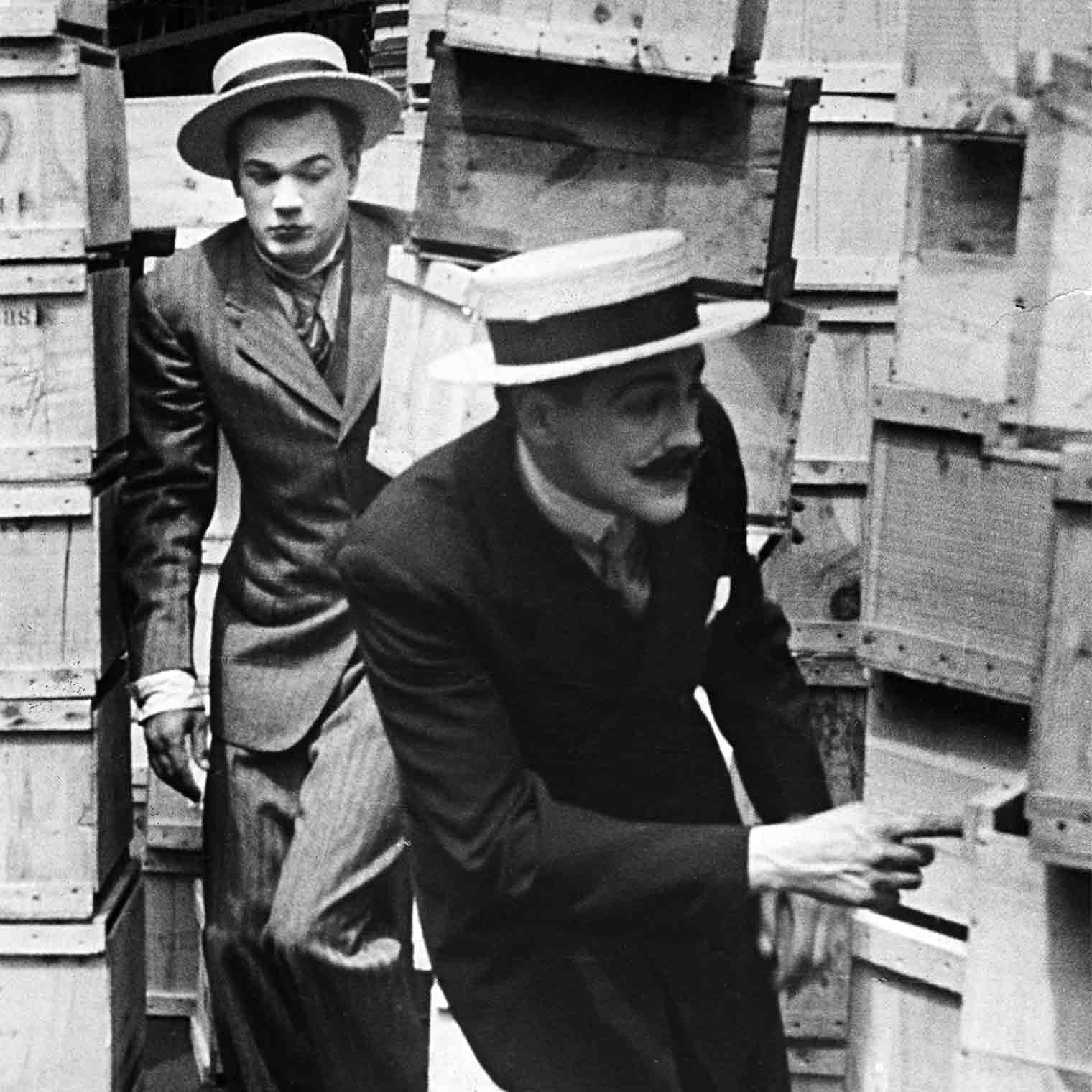
Joseph Cotten and Edgar Barrier in a film sequence for Orson Welles' 1938 stage production Too Much Johnson

- Le Spectre vert (1930) - Le médecin (film debut)
- Too Much Johnson (1938) - Leon Dathis
- Escape (1940) - Commissioner
- Comrade X (1940) - Rubick
- The Penalty (1941) - Burns
- They Dare Not Love (1941) - Capt. Wilhelm Ehrhardt
- Bombay Clipper (1942) - Man on Intercom (voice, uncredited)
- Danger in the Pacific (1942) - Zambesi
- Eagle Squadron (1942) - Wadislaw Borowsky
- The Pride of the Yankees (1942) - Hospital Doctor
- Sherlock Holmes and the Voice of Terror (1942) - Voice of Terror (voice, uncredited)
- Arabian Nights (1942) - Nadan
- The Adventures of Smilin' Jack (1943, Serial) - Tommy Thompson
- Journey into Fear (1943) - Kuvetli
- We've Never Been Licked (1943) - Nishikawa
- Phantom of the Opera (1943) - Raoul Dubert
- Crazy House (1943) - Studio Actor (uncredited)
- Flesh and Fantasy (1943) - Stranger in Mask Shop (Episode 1)
- Cobra Woman (1944) - Martok
- Secrets of Scotland Yard (1944) - John Usher / Robert Usher
- Nob Hill (1945) - Lash Carruthers
- Cornered (1945) - DuBois, Insurance Man
- A Game of Death (1945) - Erich Kreiger
- Song of Mexico (1945) - Gregory Davis
- Tarzan and the Leopard Woman (1946) - Dr. Ameer Lazar
- Rocky (1948) - John Hammond
- To the Ends of the Earth (1948) - Grieg
- Adventures in Silverado (1948) - Robert Louis Stevenson
- Port Said (1948) - The Great Lingallo
- Macbeth (1948) - Banquo, the only Shakespearean role he played on film
- Rogues' Regiment (1948) - Colonel Mauclaire
- The Secret of St. Ives (1949) - Sgt. Carnac
- Last of the Buccaneers (1950) - George Mareval
- Joe Palooka in the Squared Circle (1950) - Dist. Atty. Michael Brogden
- Cyrano de Bergerac (1950) - Cardinal Richelieu, a role created for the film (uncredited)
- Hurricane Island (1951) - Ponce de León
- The Whip Hand (1951) - Dr. Edward Keller
- Prince of Pirates (1953) - Count Blanco
- Destination Gobi (1953) - Yin Tang (uncredited)
- Count the Hours (1953) - Dist. Atty. Jim Gillespie
- The War of the Worlds (1953) - Prof. McPherson (uncredited)
- The Stand at Apache River (1953) - Cara Blanca
- The Golden Blade (1953) - Caliph
- The Saracen Blade (1954) - Baron Rogliano
- Princess of the Nile (1954) - Shaman
- Silver Lode (1955) - Thad Taylor, Attorney (uncredited)
- Rumble on the Docks (1956) - Pete Smigelski
- The Giant Claw (1957) - Dr. Karol Noymann
- Juke Box Rhythm (1959) - Ambassador Truex
- On the Double (1961) - Blankmeister
- Snow White and the Three Stooges (1961) - King Augustus
- Pirates of Tortuga (1961) - Sir Thomas Mollyford
- Irma la Douce (1963) - Gen. Lafayette (uncredited) (final film)
