= Green Hornet (disambiguation) =

Green Hornet and The Green Hornet may refer to:

== Automobiles and motorcycles ==
- Green Hornet, a version of the 1972 AMC Hornet sedan built and marketed in Canada
- The Green Hornet, name under which Amazing Sea-Monkeys inventor Harold von Braunhut raced motorcycles

== Comics ==
- The Green Hornet (comics), a 2010 comic book series by Kevin Smith

== Films ==
- The Green Hornet (serial), the 1940 Universal movie serial based on the radio series
  - The Green Hornet Strikes Again!, the 1941 Universal movie serial sequel based on the radio series
- The Green Hornet (1994 film), a Hong Kong film unrelated to the original radio series
- The Green Hornet (2006 film), a French short-movie
- The Green Hornet (2011 film), a film written by Seth Rogen and Evan Goldberg
- The Green Hornet was a nickname for an ice fishing rod used by Walter Matthau's character Max Goldman in the 1993 film Grumpy Old Men

== High school athletics ==
- Green Hornets, the sports teams of Emmaus High School in Emmaus, Pennsylvania

== Military ==
- Green Hornet, nickname for the Bell UH-1F variant of the "Huey" military utility helicopter used in Cambodia and Laos during the Vietnam War
- SIGSALY, an early secure speech system known as "Green Hornet"

== Music ==
- "Green Hornet", a jazz version of Rimsky-Korsakov's "Flight of the Bumblebee", recorded by Al Hirt and used as the theme song on The Green Hornet TV series (later used in the 2003 film Kill Bill); the title of the original piece is "Green Bee"

== Radio ==
- The Green Hornet (radio series), the original 1936 radio series that introduced the Green Hornet character
  - The Green Hornet, a fictional character created by Fran Striker for the 1930s radio program and adapted into several media versions

== Slang ==
- Green Hornets, a slang term in some Canadian cities for parking by-law enforcement officers; also "blue hornets" more recently in Toronto since the uniform is now blue (but formerly green)

== Streetcars and subways ==
- Green Hornet, PCC streetcars used until 1958 by the Chicago Surface Lines and Chicago Transit Authority
- Green Hornet, an MS Multi-section car (New York City Subway car)

== Television ==
- The Green Hornet, the 1960s television series based on the radio series
