= Kato (The Green Hornet) =

Fictional character from The Green Hornet

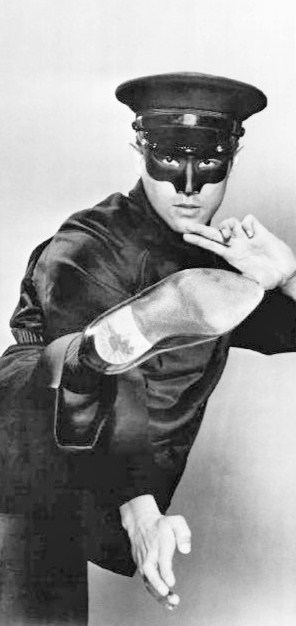
- Bruce Lee as Kato

Publication information
- First appearance: The Green Hornet (1936)
- Created by: Fran Striker

In-story information
- Partnerships: Green Hornet
- Supporting character of: Mulan Kato (daughter)
- Abilities: Master martial artist Automotive engineering expert Kung-fu; Jiujitsu; Judo

Kato (Note: /ˈkeɪtoʊ/ KAY-toe; Chinese: 加藤, Japanese: カトー) is a fictional character from The Green Hornet franchise. The character has appeared with the Green Hornet in radio, film, television, book and comic book versions. Kato is the Green Hornet's crime-fighting sidekick, and Britt Reid's manservant in civilian life, and has been played by a number of actors. On radio, Kato was initially played by Raymond Hayashi, then Roland Parker who had the role for most of the run, and in the later years Mickey Tolan and Paul Carnegie. Keye Luke took the role in the movie serials, and in the television series, he was portrayed by Bruce Lee. Jay Chou played Kato in the 2011 Green Hornet film.

== Character history ==
Kato is Britt Reid's valet, who doubles as The Green Hornet's masked driver and partner to help him in his vigilante adventures, disguised as the activities of a racketeer and his chauffeur/bodyguard/enforcer. According to the storyline, years before the events depicted in the series, Britt Reid saved Kato's life while traveling in the Far East. Depending on the version of the story, this prompts Kato to become Reid's assistant or friend. In the anthology book, The Green Hornet Chronicles from Moonstone Books, author Richard Dean Starr's story "Nothing Gold Can Stay: An Origin Story of Kato" explores the character's background and how he ends up living in America, suggesting that Kato met Britt Reid on a later trip back to his homeland while in search of his mother.

=== Radio program ===
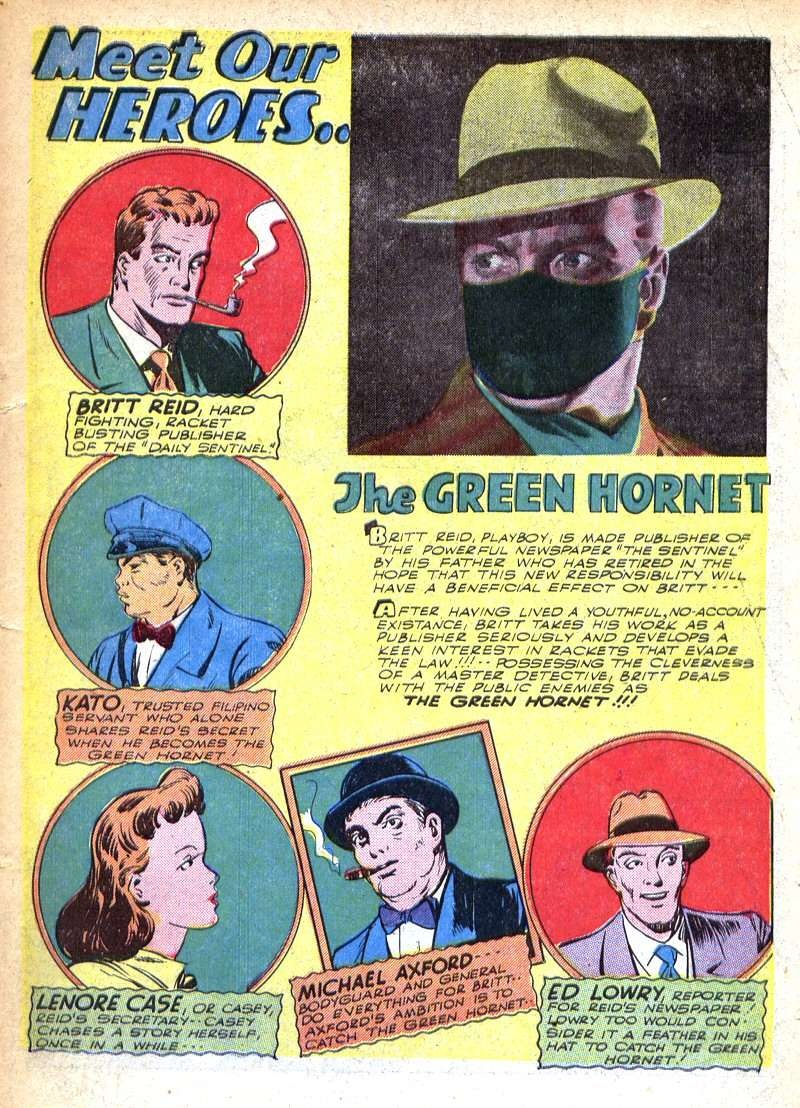
Kato depicted as Filipino in Green Hornet Comics #7, June 1942 published by Harvey Comics

George W. Trendle, the owner of radio station WXYZ in Michigan first created and produced "The Green Hornet" show in 1936, with the scripts being written by Fran Striker. The show became so popular it ran for nearly two decades and spun off at least two films. This was Trendle and Striker's second big radio hit; their first was "The Lone Ranger".

=== Nationality ===
In the 1936 premiere of the radio program, Kato was presented as being Japanese. By 1939, the invasion of China by the Empire of Japan made this bad for public relations, and from that year until 1945 "Britt Reid's Japanese valet" in the show's opening was then simply identified by the announcer as his "faithful valet". The first of Universal's two movie serials, produced in 1939 but not released to theaters until early 1940, referred in passing to Kato being "a Korean". By 1941, Kato had begun to be referred to as Filipino. In the comics published by Harvey Comics, Kato was also described as Filipino. A long-standing, but false, urban legend maintained that the switch from one to the other occurred immediately after the 1941 bombing of Pearl Harbor. In serials, Kato was played by Chinese-born American actor Keye Luke. In the 2011 film, Kato (played by Taiwanese Jay Chou) tells Britt Reid that he was born in the Chinese city of Shanghai; Reid replies by saying that he "love[s] Japan".

== Abilities ==
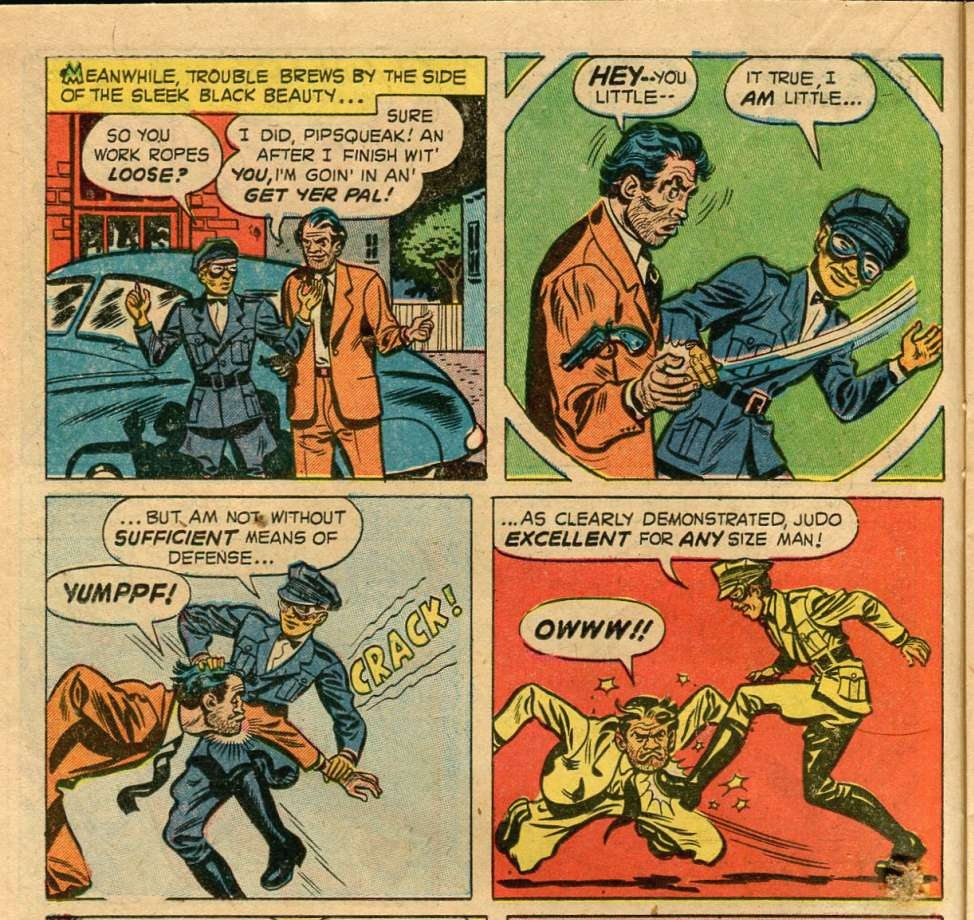
Kato applying judo techniques in Green Hornet Fights Crime #42 (November 1948) art by Al Avison

In several versions of the story, Kato is also a mechanic, with the creations of both the special automobile, the Black Beauty, and the Hornet's trademark sleeping gas and the gun that delivers it attributed to him. In the TV series, Kato (portrayed by Bruce Lee) is not at all a mechanic but a professional servant, a highly skilled driver, and a master of the art of war. In the television series, he also becomes an expert in martial arts, which was implied in the first film serial with his use of a tranquilizing "chop" to the back of a thug's neck. In The Green Hornet Strikes! of the Big Little Book series, published in 1940, it is said that Kato was a practitioner of jiujitsu,in the Helnit comics, Britt Reid said that she learned jiujitsu from Kato. In the Harvey Comics, Kato shows knowledge of judo. The comic book published by Gold Key Comics says that the Kato in the TV series practiced kung fu.

== In other media ==
=== Television series ===
The televised series of The Green Hornet was created and produced by William Dozier, the owner of Greenway Productions, for ABC. It ran from September 1966 to March 1967 and was then canceled after that one season. Van Williams played the Green Hornet and Bruce Lee played Kato. Dozier was also the creator of the more popular Batman television series. Even though he had the Green Hornet and Kato appear on Batman three times, they never acquired a large audience.

It was due in part to Bruce Lee's portrayal of this character that the Green Hornet became more well-known, and that martial arts became more popular in the United States in the 1960s. Indeed, Lee refused to follow the American director's expectation of fisticuff fights and insisted that he be allowed to use his martial arts skills. They became so popular with the audience that Van Williams, who played the Green Hornet, asked to be taught some moves. In a crossover episode of Batman from the same time and companies, Kato has a battle with Robin that ends in a draw (the same thing happens simultaneously with their senior partners). This was in part because Lee refused to participate in a fight that showed Asian-style martial arts being defeated; the original script had the Green Hornet and Kato being beaten by Batman and Robin. The popular impression Lee made at the time is demonstrated by one of the TV series tie-in coloring books produced by Watkins & Strathmore. It is titled Kato's Revenge Featuring the Green Hornet. The Green Hornet's success in Hong Kong, where it was popularly known as The Kato Show, led to Lee starring in the feature films that would make him a pop culture icon. This show launched Bruce Lee's adult television and film career.

=== Comic book adaptations ===
All Green Hornet comic book adaptations have included Kato. These were produced by Helnit (later Holyoke), Harvey, Dell and, tied into the television version, Gold Key. Beginning in 1989 one, published by NOW Comics, established a continuity between the different versions of the story. In this comic, the TV/Bruce Lee version of Kato is the son of the Kato from the radio stories and has the given name Hayashi as an homage to the character's first radio actor.

The comic also establishes a new Kato, a much younger half-sister of the television-based character, Mishi. This female Kato also insists on being treated as the Hornet's full partner rather than a sidekick. However, the Green Hornet, Inc., soon withdrew approval and this character was replaced with the 1960s version after Vol. 1, #10. Her removal was explained by having the Kato family company, Nippon Today, needing her automotive designing services at its Zurich, Switzerland facility. Mishi returns in Volume 2, appearing sporadically in the new costumed identity of the Crimson Wasp, on a vendetta against the criminal, Johnny Dollar. She eventually reveals (in The Green Hornet Vol. 2, #s 12 & 13, August & September 1992) that he had been an embezzling executive at the Swiss plant, whose actions she unwittingly began to expose. Consequently, he had murdered her fiancé and his daughter in an attack that also caused the unknowingly pregnant Mishi, the main target, to miscarry.

In #34, July 1994 issue of that run, she appears in her "Hornet's partner" guise one additional time, as the masked Paul Reid attends a gangland meeting; the rules stated that each "boss" is allowed two "boys". During this period, Hayashi becomes romantically involved with District Attorney Diana Reid, daughter of the original Hornet, who even thinks for a while that she conceived his child. In the final issue, Diana discusses their wedding plans with Mishi. In the last two issues, yet another Kato, a nephew to both of these named Kono, is brought in to allow the aging Hayashi to retire from crime-fighting, but the publisher's ceasing of operations prevents much of him being seen. The Bruce Lee-based Kato is also featured in two of his own spin-off miniseries, written by Mike Baron. The first has him defending a Chinese temple, where he studied kung fu, from the Communist government, while in the second he takes the job of bodyguarding a heroin-addicted rock star. A third solo adventure, also by Baron, was announced and promoted first as another miniseries, then as a graphic novel (now subtitled "Dragons in Eden"), but was left unpublished when NOW folded. The line featured one other version of the character.

The three-issue mini-series The Green Hornet: Dark Tomorrow (June–August 1993) is set approximately one hundred years in the future, and has an Asian-American Green Hornet, real name Clayton Reid, who is corrupted by power and truly becomes the crime boss he is supposed to only pretend to be, fighting a Caucasian Kato. Beyond the reversal of ethnicities, the latter adds the claim that he and the future Hornet are cousins, and the art's depiction of this Hornet's unnamed paternal grandparents resembles Paul Reid and Mishi Kato. Although the future Kato is not further identified here, a later "Reid/Kato Family Trees" feature (in The Green Hornet, Vol. 2, #26, October 1993) gives him the first name Luke.

This comic book incarnation gives a degree of official status to a long-standing error about the character, that in his masked identity he is known as Kato. The name is restricted to his private persona in the original radio series, the two movie serials, and most of the television version (there are two slips in this last medium, one on the Batman appearance, the other in the last filmed episode of the Hornet series itself, "Invasion from Outer Space, Part 2"; this story is well out of sync with the rest of the run, and the writer, director, and even the line producer are people with no other credits on the program). But the NOW comic version made a big point of having the masked assistants called Kato, with the woman at one early point telling the equally new Hornet during their first adventure, "While I'm in this funky get-up, call me Kato. It's part of the tradition".

In the Kevin Smith's 2010 revamp of the continuity, Kato is depicted, in modern times, as the elderly but still physically fit valet of the late Britt Reid, killed by a yakuza mobster going by the Black Hornet sobriquet. The elder Kato, in this version a Japanese, forced to act Filipino to avoid the suspicions and the racist charges against his people during WWII, retires his identity along with Britt Reid, and both men decide to devote themselves to their families, respectively raising their offspring Britt Reid Jr. and Mulan Kato.

After Britt Reid's death, Kato returns in America with Mulan, now the second Kato, to act out the Secret Testament of Britt Reid Sr., who wished, in the event of his death, Kato to destroy every Green Hornet paraphernalia still in his possession and whisk Britt Reid Jr. to Japan, for his safety. However, both offspring refuse Reid's and Kato's will: Mulan Kato, now clad in a close variation of her father's original outfit, storms off to confront the Yakuza, and Britt Reid Jr. manages to steal a Green Hornet costume to help her, despite having little training on his own.

As the new Kato, Mulan is a strong, physically fit fighter. Despite having been shown in her late teens as outgoing, the adult Mulan Kato is a darker, brooding character who rarely speaks (partly to prevent the much more talkative Britt Reid Jr., and seemingly everyone else, from talking back) and shows little interest in socializing. Her reserve frustrates the second Green Hornet, who, like his father is a socialite.

In addition, the limited series Green Hornet: Parallel Lives by writer Jai Nitz, served as a prequel to the 2011 Green Hornet film, exploring the backstory for the film's version of Kato.

In 2013, an eight-issue miniseries called Masks brought together famous heroes from the pulp era. It stars The Shadow, the Green Hornet, Kato, The Spider and Zorro, and was written by Chris Roberson with art by Alex Ross and Dennis Calero.

In a 2018 series written by Amy Chu, Mulan Kato becomes the Green Hornet after Britt Reid Jr. mysteriously disappears.

=== Serials ===
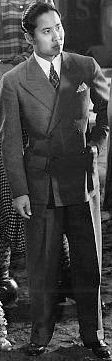
Keye Luke plays Kato in both Universal Pictures serials

The Green Hornet was adapted into two movie serials, 1940's The Green Hornet and, in 1941, The Green Hornet Strikes Again! Disliking the treatment Republic gave The Lone Ranger in two serials, George W. Trendle took his property to Universal Pictures, and was much happier with the results. The first serial, titled simply The Green Hornet (1940), stars Gordon Jones in the title role, albeit dubbed by original radio Hornet Al Hodge whenever the hero's mask was in place, while The Green Hornet Strikes Again! (1941) stars Warren Hull. Keye Luke, who played the "Number One Son" in the Charlie Chan films, plays Kato in both. Also starring in both serials are Anne Nagel as Lenore Case, Britt Reid's secretary, and Wade Boteler as Mike Axford, a reporter for the Daily Sentinel, the newspaper that Reid owns and publishes. Ford Beebe directed both serials, partnered by Ray Taylor on The Green Hornet and John Rawlins on The Green Hornet Strikes Again!, with George H. Plympton and Basil Dickey contributing to the screenplays for both serials. The Green Hornet runs for 13 chapters while The Green Hornet Strikes Again! has 15 installments, with the Hornet and Kato smashing a different racket in each chapter. In each serial, they are all linked to a single major crime syndicate which is itself put out of business in the finale, while the radio program had the various rackets completely independent of each other.

=== The Green Hornet (2006) ===
A 10-minute 2006 French short film titled Le frelon vert is based on the Green Hornet.

Sony Pictures announced plans for a feature film of the superhero in 2008. Released on January 14, 2011, the film starred Seth Rogen, who took on writing duties along with Superbad co-writer Evan Goldberg. Stephen Chow had originally signed to play Kato, but then dropped out. Taiwanese actor Jay Chou replaced Chow as Kato for the film. In this version, Kato is Chinese and grew up as a poor runaway from his orphanage in Shanghai. He was originally employed by Britt Reid's father James as a car mechanic (also making his coffee with a specially designed machine he had created for the purpose) before joining Britt on the steps that lead to him becoming the Green Hornet as Britt concluded that they had both been wasting their potential. Kato's martial art skills in this version of the series are so exceptional that he claims that time literally slows down for him when he gets an adrenaline rush in a dangerous situation, as well as his traditional role as mechanic and driver. Although he and Britt have a temporary falling-out when they argue over their respective importance to the "Green Hornet" concept – Kato acting as the actual action man of the Hornet while Britt is the public face as Kato is too fast for any cameras to see him – they patch up their differences in time to destroy the gang of crime lord Chudnofsky.

In 2016, Paramount Pictures and Chernin Entertainment acquired the rights to The Green Hornet and started preliminary work on developing a reboot with Gavin O'Connor attached to produce and direct the film and Sean O'Keefe as writer. In 2020, Amasia Entertainment has gained the rights of the Green Hornet and officially teamed with Universal Pictures for the reboot titled Green Hornet and Kato.

=== Video games ===
Kato appears in The Green Hornet: Wheels of Justice (2010) for iPhone, based on the film.

== In other popular culture ==
=== Art, entertainment, and media ===
- Aretha Franklin's 1967 album "I Never Loved a Man the Way I Love You" contains the song "Save Me" which includes the lyric "Calling the Caped Crusader, Green Hornet, Kato, too / I'm in so much trouble I don't know what to do".
- The 1960s cartoon series Batfink is a parody of both Batman and the Green Hornet. Batfink rides in a pink vehicle called the Battilac, which is driven by his assistant Karate who is a martial artist.
- Bill Cosby parodied The Green Hornet in his c. 1970 syndicated five-minute daily radio program, The Brown Hornet, which he revived in the late 1970s for his Fat Albert and the Cosby Kids cartoon show.
- Kato appears in Bruceploitation films: Bruce Li played Bruce Lee as Kato in Bruce Lee Against Supermen (1975) and Bruce Leung plays Lee and Kato in The Dragon Lives Again (1977).
- In the 1975 comedy film The Return of the Pink Panther, Inspector Clouseau's Chinese assistant Cato is a parody of Kato.
- The 1993 American semi-fictionalized film biography Dragon: The Bruce Lee Story, in which Jason Scott Lee (no relation) portrayed Bruce Lee, featured scenes involving the filming of the TV series The Green Hornet. Van Williams, who starred in that TV series, appeared in the film as the show's director.
- A 1994 Hong Kong film, The Green Hornet (Qing feng xia), starred Kar Lok Chin as a Kato-like masked hero called the Green Hornet. In one scene, he is reminded of his predecessors, one of whom is represented by a mannequin of Bruce Lee in his TV Kato costume. The film's director, Lam Ching Ying, was a friend of Bruce Lee.
- Black Mask is a 1996 Hong Kong action film starring Jet Li. The film is an adaptation of the 1992 manhua Black Mask by Li Chi-Tak. In the film, in homage to The Green Hornet, Black Mask wears a domino mask and chauffeur's cap in the same style as Kato from the series. The Black Mask is even compared to Kato in one scene. In 2002, it was followed by a sequel, Black Mask 2: City of Masks starring Andy On.
- The 2003 film Kill Bill: Volume 1 uses Billy May's theme from the 1960s television series in a sequence where the Bride goes to Tokyo in search of O-Ren Ishii. The Crazy 88 wear masks resembling Bruce Lee's Kato mask.
- Lee also appears as Kato in the biographical series The Legend of Bruce Lee (2008), starring Danny Chan.
- In 2009, in the comic book anthology Secret Identities: The Asian American Superhero Anthology, Gene Luen Yang and Sonny Liew published the story Blue Scorpion and Chung. In it, Chung, a character inspired by Kato, uses her martial arts skills to get her boss, Blue Scorpion, out of trouble when he is drunk.
- In the film Legend of the Fist: The Return of Chen Zhen, released late September 2010 in Asia and early 2011 in the United States, there is a large feature of the Green Hornet. The subplot consist of the main character Chen Zhen (played by Donnie Yen) dressing up as a mask vigilante (based on Kato) to stop Japanese assassinations and to protect the people. The director has mentioned that since Bruce Lee played both Chen Zhen (in the 1972 film Fist of Fury) and Kato (in the 1960s television series The Green Hornet) before, the film was a tribute and dedication to Lee.
- In 2016, Season 6 of The Venture Bros. introduces parody characters of Green Hornet and Kato from 1960s television series in the form of the masked crime-fighter Blue Morpho and his assistant Kano in a flashback, the latter having later become a member of the original Team Venture. It is also revealed that Blue Morpho was the adoptive father of the orphaned villain The Monarch, and he and Henchman 21 later take on the roles of the Blue Morpho and Kano respectively.
- The 2019 film Once Upon a Time in Hollywood has a flashback scene in which stuntman Cliff Booth (Brad Pitt) has a confrontation with Bruce Lee (played by Mike Moh in full Kato gear) on the set of The Green Hornet. In the scene, an impromptu two-out-of-three martial arts match between Booth and Lee takes place, with both men winning one match, but the fight is broken up before the deciding match can finish.
- When Dom DeLuise assumes his Captain Chaos superhero persona in the Cannonball Run he refers to Burt Reynolds' character as his trusty sidekick Kato.
