= The Green Hornet Strikes Again! =

1941 film by Ford Beebe, John Rawlins

- Directed by: Ford Beebe; John Rawlins
- Written by: George H. Plympton; Basil Dickey; Sherman L. Lowe; Fred MacIsaac; Fran Striker (characters)
- Produced by: Henry MacRae
- Starring: Warren Hull; Keye Luke; Pierre Watkin; Anne Nagel; Wade Boteler; Eddie Acuff
- Cinematography: Jerome Ash
- Edited by: Saul A. Goodkind (supervising); Joseph Gluck; Louis Sackin; Alvin Todd
- Music by: Charles Previn
- Distributed by: Universal Pictures
- Release date: 4 January 1941
- Running time: 15 chapters (293 min)
- Country: United States
- Language: English

The Green Hornet Strikes Again! is a 1941 Universal black-and-white 15 chapter movie serial based on The Green Hornet radio series by George W. Trendle and Fran Striker. It is a superhero-themed story about the eponymous superhero, the Green Hornet. It is a sequel to Universal's earlier serial The Green Hornet (1940). This was the 117th serial (the 49th with sound) of the 137 that Universal produced. The plot involves racketeering and is unusual for a movie serial by having mostly stand-alone chapters instead of each running into the next; this was also the case for Universal's first Green Hornet serial.

== Plot ==
Wealthy publisher Britt Reid and his trusted Korean valet and sidekick disguise themselves as the crime fighting vigilantes, The Green Hornet and Kato. Over the course of 15 chapters, they battle the growing power of ruthless crime lord "Boss" Crogan and his varied rackets and henchmen across the city. Unknown to them, Crogan also has strong ties to foreign powers unfriendly to the United States.

== Cast ==
- Warren Hull as Britt Reid and his alter ego The Green Hornet. Hull replaced Gordon Jones in this role and also provided the voice of the Hornet (instead of radio voice Al Hodge in the original serial).
- Wade Boteler as Michael Axford, Britt Reid's bodyguard
- Anne Nagel as Lenore "Casey" Case, Britt Reid's secretary
- Keye Luke as Kato, the Green Hornet's sidekick
- Eddie Acuff as Ed Lowery, a reporter
- Pierre Watkin (listed in the credits as "Pierre Watkins") as Boss Crogan, racketeer
- James Seay as Bordine, one of Boss Crogan's henchmen
- Arthur Loft as Tauer, Boss Crogan's chief henchman
- Joe Devlin as Dolan, one of Boss Crogan's henchmen
- William Hall as DeLuca, one of Boss Crogan's henchmen
- Dorothy Lovett as Frances Grayson, an aluminum heiress, and Stella Merja, an actress hired to replace her

== Chapter titles ==
1. Flaming Havoc
2. The Plunge of Peril
3. The Avenging Heavens
4. A Night of Terror
5. Shattering Doom
6. The Fatal Flash
7. Death in the Clouds
8. Human Targets
9. The Tragic Crash
10. Blazing Fury
11. Thieves of the Night
12. Crashing Barriers
13. The Flaming Inferno
14. Racketeering Vultures
15. Smashing the Crime Ring
