= John Edward McCarthy =

American actor

John Edward McCarthy (1911–1977 ) was an American radio actor and announcer. His longest part was playing Green Hornet in the eponymous radio series from 1947 to 1952.

== Early life and Marine Corps ==
Born on a farm near Parnell, Michigan, McCarthy attended St. Thomas High School in Ann Arbor, and attended the University of Michigan.

Before World War II, he was an announcer at radio stations WMBC and WXYZ in Detroit, Michigan. On WXYZ in the late 1930s, McCarthy played the part of Ned Jordan, secret agent, in the Fran Striker radio serial drama of the same name. Just before World War II, he became Chief Announcer at WXYZ.

During World War II, he was a Lieutenant in the United States Marine Corps and was stationed on Eniwetok Atoll in the Marshall Islands in the Pacific where he ran the Armed Forces Radio station.

== Radio career ==
He played the part of the Green Hornet on the famous radio series from 1947 until the program ended in December 1952. The program originated from WXYZ in Detroit, Michigan. At the time, he was known as "Jack McCarthy."

For several years until 1952 he was also station manager and an announcer at WXYZ. During those years, two other national radio dramas originated from WXYZ radio: The Lone Ranger and Challenge of the Yukon (also known as Sergeant Preston of the Yukon).

During his early career in radio, he worked with Danny Thomas, Mike Wallace, Douglas Edwards and Al Hodge (who later went on to play television's Captain Video).

McCarthy moved to New York City in 1954, doing radio and television commercials. He also reported the news at WPIX television. Because there was already a "Jack McCarthy" on staff at WPIX, John McCarthy became known in New York as "John E. McCarthy". In July 1956 McCarthy was taken to the liner SS Île de France to interview survivors of the sinking of the SS Andrea Doria ocean liner bound for New York harbor.

== Personal life ==
In 1936 he married Virginia Hanlon and had two children: J. Thomas McCarthy and Maureen C. McCarthy.

McCarthy was a devout Catholic and served as a lector at St. Ignatius Loyola Church in New York City. He died on December 17, 1977, and was buried in the St. Patrick's Church cemetery in Parnell, Michigan following a funeral mass St. Ignatius Loyola Church.
