= The Green Hornet (2011 film) =

Film by Michel Gondry

- Theatrical release poster
- Directed by: Michel Gondry
- Written by: Seth Rogen; Evan Goldberg
- Based on: The Green Hornet by: George W. Trendle; Fran Striker (uncredited)
- Produced by: Neal H. Moritz
- Starring: Seth Rogen; Jay Chou; Christoph Waltz; Cameron Diaz; Edward James Olmos; David Harbour; Tom Wilkinson
- Cinematography: John Schwartzman
- Edited by: Michael Tronick
- Music by: James Newton Howard
- Production companies: Columbia Pictures; Original Film
- Distributed by: Sony Pictures Releasing
- Release dates: January 10, 2011 (Los Angeles); January 14, 2011 (United States)
- Running time: 119 minutes
- Country: United States
- Language: English
- Budget: $110–120 million
- Box office: $229.3 million

The Green Hornet is a 2011 American superhero film directed by Michel Gondry from a screenplay by Seth Rogen and Evan Goldberg. Rogen stars in the film as the Green Hornet, a character created by George W. Trendle and Fran Striker in 1936. Jay Chou also stars as his sidekick Kato, alongside Christoph Waltz, Cameron Diaz, Edward James Olmos, David Harbour, and Tom Wilkinson. In the film, a newspaper publisher's son, following his father's sudden death, teams up with a martial arts-skilled mechanic to become crime-fighting vigilantes, attracting the attention of a Russian mobster.

The Green Hornet was released to theaters in North America on January 14, 2011, by Sony Pictures Releasing. The film received mixed reviews from critics and grossed $227.8 million against a $120 million production budget.

== Plot ==
When James Reid, publisher of the Daily Sentinel, dies, his estranged son Britt takes over the newspaper and fires most of his father's personal staff. Britt later rehires Kato, a mechanic skilled in martial arts and coffee brewing, as his assistant and the two become friends. Britt convinces Kato they should become crime-fighters. Kato develops an Imperial car, outfitted with several gadgets and weapons, which they call the "Black Beauty". Britt plans to capture Benjamin Chudnofsky, a Russian mobster who intends to unite the crime families of Los Angeles under his command. To get Chudnofsky's attention, Britt uses the Daily Sentinel to publish articles about his alter ego, dubbed "The Green Hornet" and mark the green hornet as a villain.

Britt and Kato blow up several of Chudnofsky's meth labs, leaving calling cards behind. District Attorney Frank Scanlon frets over public perception that he cannot stop the Hornet. Britt asks his researcher Lenore Case out, but she invites Kato instead, making Britt jealous. Kato learns from her that mobsters often offer a peace summit to rivals in order to get close enough to kill them; Britt then tells Kato that Chudnofsky has offered them such a meeting. Kato tries dissuading him, but Britt ignores him. Once there, Chudnofsky tries to kill them, but Kato manages to save them and escape. Upon returning to the mansion, Britt and Kato start arguing. In a fit of rage, Britt fires both Kato and Lenore.

Britt discovers that Scanlon is corrupt and an ally of Chudnofsky. Scanlon reveals James found out and tried to expose him, so he had Chudnofsky assassinate him. When Britt reveals he recorded Scanlon's confession Kato arrives, with Chudnofsky and some of his men outside waiting for the "Hornet" to kill Britt. After Britt apologizes to Kato, he accepts and saves him. Chudnofsky and his men storm the restaurant and attempt to murder the duo who escape in another Black Beauty. Chudnofsky, Scanlon, and their men chase Britt and Kato throughout L.A., ending in a fight at the Daily Sentinel office. During the fight Britt and Kato kill Chudnofsky, but when they realize they didn't record Scanlon's confession Kato uses the heavily damaged Black Beauty to run Scanlon off the top of the building.

Britt and Kato hide out at Lenore's house, where she learns their alter egos. The next morning, Britt promotes Mike Axford to chief editor and pretends to get shot by Kato posing as the Green Hornet, solidifying the "Green Hornet" as a vigilante and allowing Britt to get treated in a hospital for a wound he received the night before.

== Cast ==
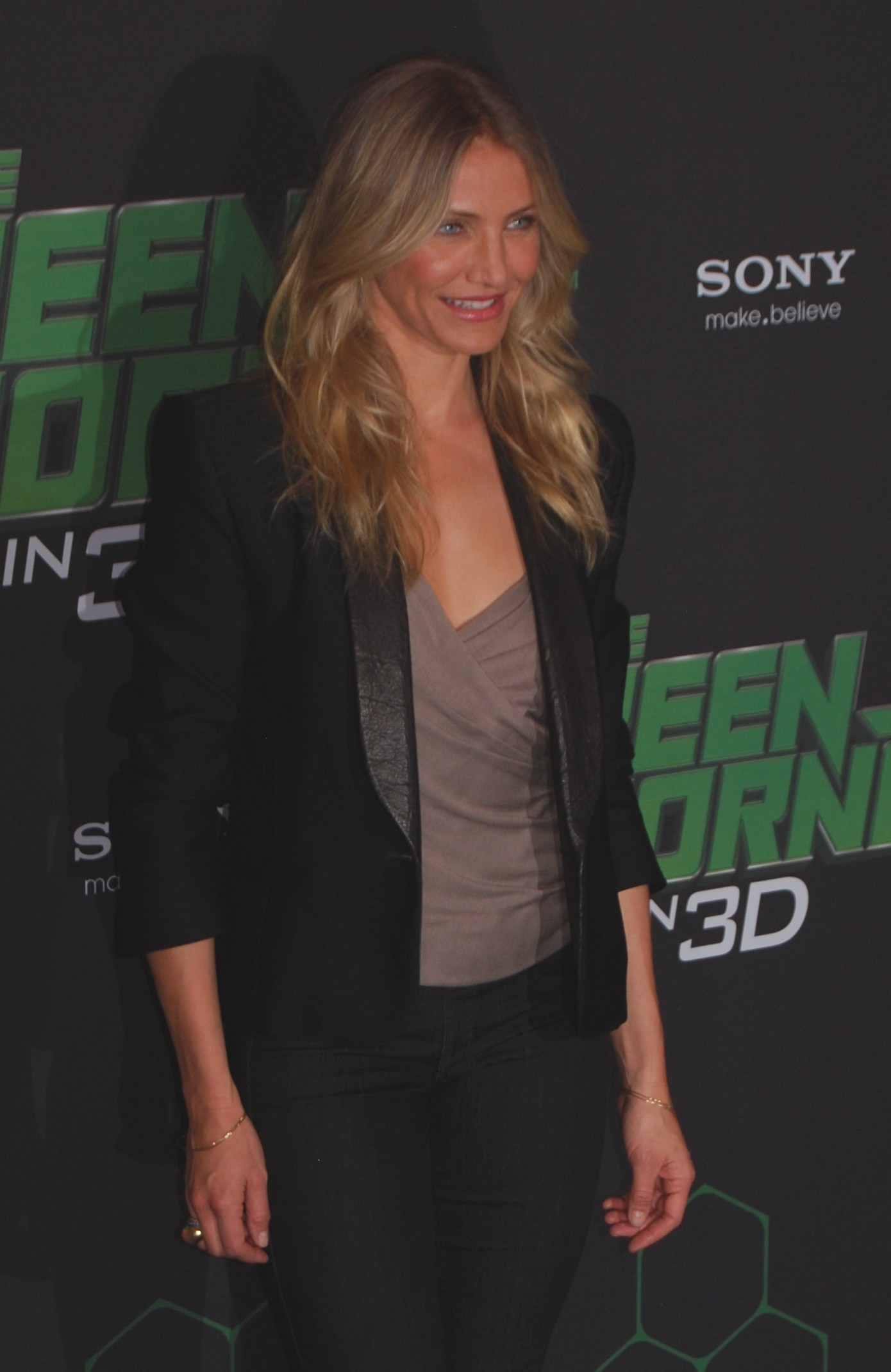
Cameron Diaz at the film's December 3, 2010, premiere in Berlin

- Seth Rogen as Britt Reid/The Green Hornet, a wealthy newspaper publisher and the masked crime-fighter known as the Green Hornet. Joshua Erenberg portrays young Britt.
- Jay Chou as Kato, a mechanic, martial arts expert, and the Green Hornet's valet and partner.
- Cameron Diaz as Lenore Case, Reid's top secretary for The Daily Sentinel, and also the latter's love interest.
- Tom Wilkinson as James Reid, Britt's stern, wealthy father and a successful newspaper publisher.
- Christoph Waltz as Benjamin Chudnofsky / Bloodnofsky, a paranoid Russian gangster. Chudnofsky plans to join all of the crime families of Los Angeles together to organize a "super-mafia". Throughout the film, he worries that he is losing his edge, and eventually starts calling himself "Bloodnofsky" in a misguided attempt to intimidate his enemies. Nicolas Cage was wanted for the villain.
- David Harbour as Frank Scanlon, a district attorney. In this film, Scanlon is an ally of Benjamin Chudnofsky, bribing town officials into downplaying the city's crime level in order to help his career.
- Edward James Olmos as Mike Axford, the managing editor of The Daily Sentinel.
- Jamie Harris as "Popeye", one of Chudnofsky's mob enforcers
- Chad L. Coleman as "Chili", one of Chudnofsky's mob enforcers
- Edward Furlong as Tupper, a meth dealer who is associated with Chudnofsky
- Lio Tipton (Note: Credited as Analeigh Tipton; Tipton came out as non-binary and changed their name in 2021.) as Ana Lee
- Jill Remez as a Daily Sentinel Reporter
- Reuben Langdon as Crackhead
- Jerry Trimble as Chudnofsky's Man
- James Franco as Danny "Crystal" Clear (uncredited), a rival of Chudnofsky whose club is blown up by him following their meeting.

== Production ==
=== Development ===
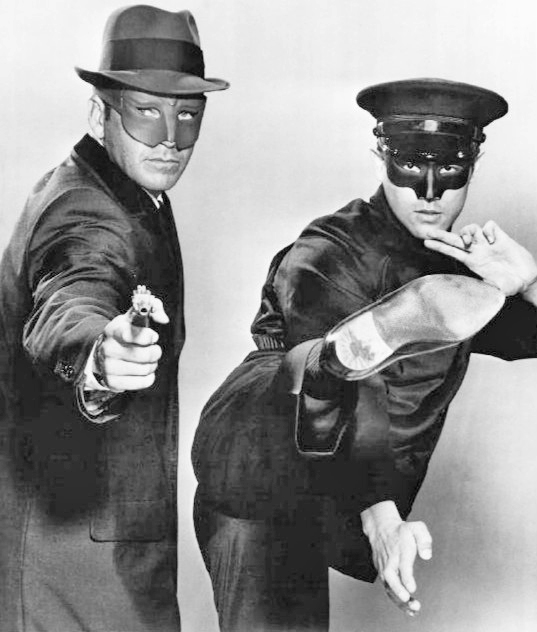
Publicity still from 1960s The Green Hornet television show

Variety reported in October 1992 that The Green Hornet was one of the properties represented by Leisure Concepts Inc., and though the trade paper said, without explanation, "rights in limbo", negotiations were ongoing with Universal Pictures. By September 1993, Chuck Pfarrer had finished the screenplay. Rich Wilkes was hired to rewrite Pfarrer's script, which resulted in George Clooney signing a pay-or-play contract. Clooney dropped out in December 1995 to star in Batman and Robin (1997), and an anonymous source at Universal told Entertainment Weekly the following May that Greg Kinnear was being looked at for the title role. Jason Scott Lee by this time had signed on to co-star as Kato. Universal hired music video director Michel Gondry in January 1997 for his feature film directorial debut. Gondry rewrote the Wilkes screenplay with Edward Neumeier, but after a year and a half of development, in which designs for props and vehicles had been created, the studio canceled the project. Lawrence Gordon and Lloyd Levin had been signed on to produce by January 1997. Mark Wahlberg was offered the lead role, but the film languished in development hell and Gondry eventually left. In April 2000, Universal entered early negotiations with Jet Li to star as Kato for $5.2 million against 5% of the film's gross. Dark Horse Entertainment and Charles Gordon joined Lawrence Gordon and Levin as producers. Christopher McQuarrie was writing a script by June 2000, but with it uncompleted by October, Li moved on to work on The One (2001) while remaining attached to The Green Hornet. After spending about $10 million in development since 1992, Universal put The Green Hornet in turnaround in November 2001, by which time Li and the producers were no longer involved. Paramount Pictures and Columbia Pictures showed interest in picking up Universal's option, but Miramax Films won the bidding that month with what Variety reported as "a deal approaching $3 million".

In May 2003 the studio was working with automobile companies on product placement opportunities for the Black Beauty. As part of the deal, Miramax Films would receive its "hero car" and $35 million in additional marketing. The car company that would have landed the deal would be given the chance to help develop The Green Hornet, since a script had yet to be written and no director was attached to the planned 2005 release. Variety noted this figure would have tied the record $35 million deal between Ford Motor Company and Metro-Goldwyn-Mayer (MGM) that featured the company's Aston Martin Vanquish, Jaguar XKR and Ford Thunderbird in the James Bond film Die Another Day. In February 2004, Miramax Films president Harvey Weinstein hired cult filmmaker and comic book writer Kevin Smith to write and direct the film, based on their previous four-film collaborations. Smith commented: "I dig the fact that he kicked off a run of billionaire playboys who decided to put on a mask and fight crime and that he was Batman before there was a Batman. I always said I'd never do a superhero film, based on my limited experience writing on Superman Lives and having to answer to the studio, Jon Peters, the comics company and eventually a director. Then there's a fandom that gets up in arms if you even try to stray from their character. Here, there is simplicity in the character and the situation". Jon Gordon and Hannah Minghella were now on as producers, with Harold Berkowitz and George Trendle, son of the character's co-creator, as executive producers. Smith approached Jake Gyllenhaal for the lead role in March 2004. In mid-November of that year, Smith said he had written about 100 pages, and estimated another 100 to come. In February 2006, Smith's official website noted: "Kevin officially no longer has anything to do with the Fletch or Green Hornet projects". Smith went on to write the Dynamite Entertainment comic book Green Hornet, which has run 11 issues as of late 2010.

=== Pre-production ===
In March 2007, producer Neal H. Moritz, who had been trying to acquire the film rights to the character for years, obtained the rights and through his Sony-based production company Original Film optioned them to Columbia. In July, Seth Rogen, in addition to starring in the lead role, was hired to co-write the script with frequent collaborator Evan Goldberg and named as an executive producer for The Green Hornet. Rogen said that month he had not begun writing the screenplay yet, but anticipated the tone would be that of "a buddy action movie" with humor, "like Lethal Weapon and 48 Hrs. In September 2008, Columbia Pictures announced a June 25, 2010 release date, and that Hong Kong star Stephen Chow had signed to direct and to co-star as Kato. Chow, a fan of the TV show as a kid, explained: "The idea of stepping into Bruce Lee's shoes as Kato is both humbling and thrilling, and to get the chance to direct the project as my American movie debut is simply a dream come true". Chow dropped out as director the following December over creative differences. Rogen later explained that Chow's inexperience with working on a tight schedule was the reasoning behind his firing as director.

Columbia Pictures announced that Gondry had returned to direct the projec in February 2009, on which Chow had remained as Kato, after impressing Columbia production presidents Doug Belgrad and Matt Tolmach with his pitch. Gondry had previously been involved with The Green Hornet when Universal Pictures was planning its version in 1997. Chow dropped out as Kato in July 2009 over scheduling conflicts with other projects. By this time the release date had been pushed to July 9, 2010. In August, he was replaced with Taiwanese singer-actor Jay Chou. The studio was then in early talks with Nicolas Cage to play the gangster villain, and Cameron Diaz was negotiating to play researcher and love interest Lenore Case. Cage ultimately passed on the role, stating in 2009: "The Green Hornet was something I wanted to do. I think Michel Gondry is very talented and I had hoped it would work. But I think Seth Rogen and Michel had a different direction for the character totally than the way I wanted to go. ... I wasn't interested in just being straight-up bad guy who was killing people willy-nilly. I had to have some humanity and try to give it something where you could understand why the character was the way he was. But there wasn't enough time to develop it". The filmmakers had wanted Van Williams, who played the Green Hornet in the 1960s television series, to make a cameo appearance as a cemetery guard, but Williams declined to play the role.

=== Locations ===
Moritz considered filming The Green Hornet in Michigan, New York and Louisiana, but ultimately chose Los Angeles, California as the primary location shooting: "Ultimately, we made the decision, and thankfully the studio agreed with us, that the creative positives of shooting in Los Angeles outweighed the tax incentives offered to us elsewhere". Principal photography began at Sony Pictures Studios in Culver City, California on September 2, 2009, for one week. Filming then moved to Chinatown, Los Angeles, for scenes featuring Kato's apartment. Through November, other locations included Sun Valley, Holmby Hills (specifically Fleur de Lys, which played the part of the Reid mansion), Bel-Air, Hawthorne and various locations downtown, including City Hall and the Los Angeles Times Building.

=== Props ===
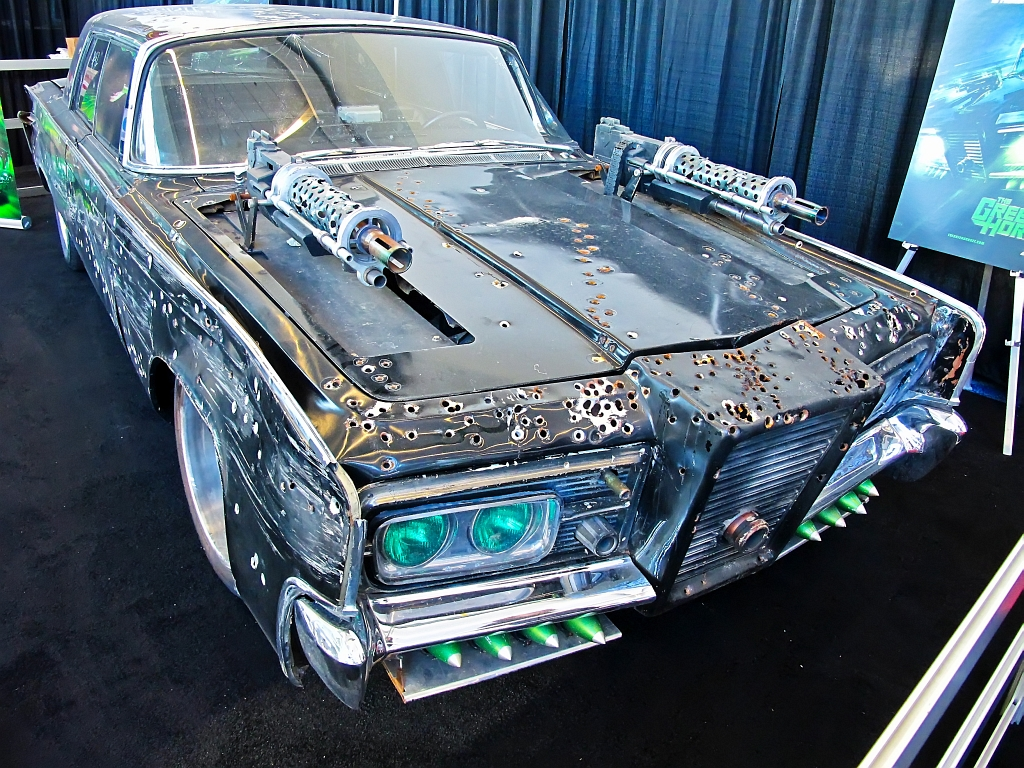
A Black Beauty Imperial used in the film.

The production modified 29 Imperial Crown sedans from model years 1964 to 1966 to portray the Green Hornet's luxurious supercar, the Black Beauty. Twenty-six of those cars were wrecked during production and three survived in pristine condition. One such vehicle was given away by the parent company of Carl's Jr. and Hardee's as a sweepstakes prize and later consigned to the 2017 Barrett-Jackson auto auction at Mohegan Sun in Connecticut, where it was sold for $29,700.

== Release ==
Sony Pictures Releasing replaced the film's June 25, 2010, release date with Grown Ups, which moved The Green Hornet to July 9, 2010. Sony then scheduled the film for December 22, 2010, before announcing on April 23, 2010, that it was pushing to January 14, 2011, to secure more time to convert it to 3D.

In July 2009, Sony presented a panel at San Diego Comic-Con, where Rogen and director Michel Gondry unveiled the first look for the Black Beauty. The first trailer was released online on June 24, 2010.

=== Marketing ===
Factory Entertainment produced six-inch action figures and a die-cast Black Beauty, among other collectibles. Hollywood Collectibles has made a full-size prop gas gun replica. Mezco Toyz has made a set of 12-inch action figures, with the prototypes donated to the Museum of the Moving Image.

The studio and CKE Restaurants, Inc., the parent company of Carl's Jr. and Hardee's, formed a promotional marketing partnership that included commercials featuring Rogen and Chou in character as the Green Hornet and Kato; a beverage promotion with Dr. Pepper; The Green Hornet food items, kids' meal toys, and employee uniforms; and a contest with the grand prize of a Black Beauty car from the film.

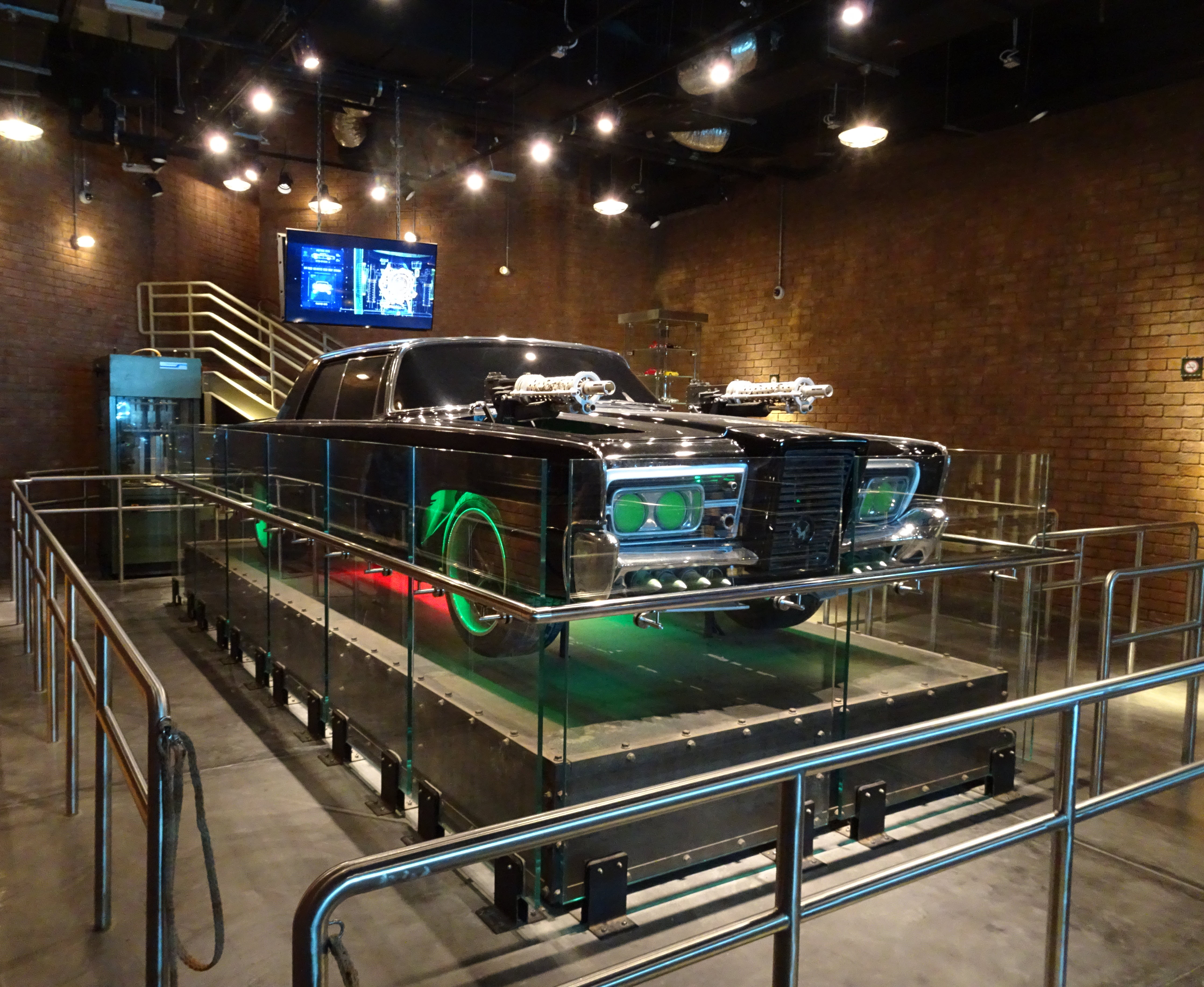
A Black Beauty Imperial used in the roller coaster Green Hornet: High Speed Chase in Motiongate Dubai.

A tie-in video game for iPhone and iPad was released, entitled The Green Hornet: Wheels of Justice. The game is a 3D top-down driving game. It also featured a hidden mini-game fighting game called The Green Hornet: Crime Fighter, which was also released for browsers and Android phones.

Green Hornet: High Speed Chase, a roller coaster themed to the 2011 Green Hornet film, opened to the public at the Motiongate Dubai theme park within Dubai Parks and Resorts in Dubai, United Arab Emirates on December 16, 2016. Located within the Columbia Pictures Zone of the theme park, the roller coaster is a custom "Bobsled" model made by the German ride manufacturer, Gerstlauer. The individual coaster cars are themed to resemble the Green Hornet's Black Beauty, and a Black Beauty car from the film production can be found as part of the ride's queue theming.

The Discovery Channel television show MythBusters aired a "Green Hornet Special" that featured Seth Rogen joining the hosts in testing two "myths" from the movie. The cable network Syfy aired a marathon of the TV series The Green Hornet on January 11, 2011, as a tie-in to the film's release.

=== Home media ===
The Green Hornet was released on DVD, Blu-ray and Blu-ray 3D on May 3, 2011, by Sony Pictures Home Entertainment.

== Reception ==
=== Critical response ===
On Rotten Tomatoes, The Green Hornet has an approval rating of 45% based on 235 reviews, with an average rating of 5.2/10. The site's critical consensus reads: "It's sporadically entertaining, but The Green Hornet never approaches the surreal heights suggested by a Michel Gondry/Seth Rogen collaboration." On Metacritic the film has a score of 39 out of 100, based on 39 critics, indicating "generally unfavorable reviews". Audiences surveyed by CinemaScore gave the film a grade "B+" on scale of A to F.

Kenneth Turan of the Los Angeles Times called it "[a]n anemic, 97-pound weakling of the action comedy persuasion ... a boring bromedy that features a hero who has no idea what he's even doing with mumblecore heroics instead of the real thing".

British critic Peter Bradshaw of the newspaper The Guardian remarked that "almost everything about the film is disappointing. Christoph Waltz is under-par as the villain with nothing like the steely charisma of his Nazi in Inglourious Basterds". Richard Roeper gave the film a D+, calling it "a lazy, sloppy, unfunny comedy that makes almost no use of the 3-D technology", and judging that "it just falls flat". Roger Ebert gave it one star out of four and called it "an almost unendurable demonstration of a movie with nothing to be about. Although it follows the rough storyline of previous versions of the title, it neglects the construction of a plot engine to pull us through". He also noted the poor use of 3-D and suggested it was added solely in order to charge extra.

Elizabeth Weitzman of the New York Daily News gave it three and a half out of five stars, and commented that the "irreverently funny" film had "a vibe so casual you half expect star Seth Rogen to amble off screen and put his feet up on the seat next to you" and praising director Gondry's "sense of humor and acute visual skill" even while calling the movie "cheerfully unfocused".

=== Response from Seth Rogen ===
Rogen proclaimed the film as a "nightmare" in a 2013 interview with Marc Maron, saying that Sony Pictures Entertainment executives paid little attention to the most expensive portions of the film, and its inflated budget.

=== Box office ===
The Green Hornet took in $33,526,876 its opening weekend, and just over $40 million for the four-day Martin Luther King, Jr. Day holiday weekend, topping the box office. In its second weekend, it dropped 47% to $17.7 million, finishing second to No Strings Attached. In its third weekend, it earned $11.2 million and finished in fourth place. The film ended its theatrical run on April 21, 2011, with a North American domestic gross of $98,780,042 and an international gross of $129,037,206 for a total $227,817,248 worldwide.

== Future ==
=== Cancelled sequel ===
In January 2011, shortly before the film's release, Goldberg said a sequel was already mapped out, saying “You don’t make a movie like this without considering the sequel. Yeah, we have the whole plot planned out, which is kind of what we would have done in the first place.” However, Moritz said in March 2012 that no sequel would be forthcoming since the movie "did almost $250 million and was actually very well liked, but we made the movie for too much money. One, we made it in L.A. for certain reasons, and two, we decided to go to 3D—that added another $10 million. If I had done it in a tax-rebate state and not done 3D, it would have been considered a huge financial success for the studio. So we're not making a sequel right now".

=== Reboot ===
In 2016, Paramount and Chernin Entertainment acquired the film rights to the Green Hornet, with developments for a rebooted adaptation. Gavin O'Connor signed on to produce and direct, and Sean O'Keefe as the screenwriter. The project did not come to fruition and the rights lapsed.

In 2020, Universal and Amasia Entertainment announced they were partnering on The Green Hornet and Kato and are in development on a film based on the classic characters. Amasia won the feature film franchise rights to the Green Hornet in January with Amasia's co-founders Michael Helfant and Bradley Gallo producing. Helfant is a veteran Hollywood executive who was president and chief operating officer of Marvel Studios for several years starting in 2005. In 2022, director Leigh Whannell became attached to the project as well as screenwriter David Koepp.
