= The Green Hornet (radio series) =

American radio adventure series

- Genre: Radio drama
- Running time: 17–30 minutes
- Country of origin: USA
- Language: English
- Home station: WXYZ
- Created by: Fran Striker and George W. Trendle
- Original release: January 31, 1936 – December 5, 1952

The Green Hornet is an American radio adventure series that debuted in 1936 and introduced the character of the Green Hornet, a masked vigilante.

== Production history ==
The series originated on January 31, 1936, on WXYZ, the same local Detroit station that originated its companion shows The Lone Ranger and Challenge of the Yukon. Beginning April 12, 1938, the station supplied the series to the Mutual Broadcasting System radio network, and then to NBC Blue and its successors, the Blue Network and ABC Network, from November 16, 1939, through September 8, 1950. It returned from September 10 to December 5, 1952. It was sponsored by General Mills from January to August 1948 and by Orange Crush in its brief 1952 run.

Distinguished by its use of classical music for themes and for bridges between scenes, The Green Hornet was "one of radio's best-known and most distinctive juvenile adventure shows". The series detailed the adventures of Britt Reid, debonair newspaper publisher by day, crime-fighting masked hero at night.

With his faithful valet Kato, Britt Reid, daring young publisher, matches wits with the Underworld, risking his life so that criminals and racketeers within the law may feel its weight by the sting of the Green Hornet!

In 1935, George W. Trendle, the WXYZ co-owner and managing partner who had spearheaded the development of The Lone Ranger, sought to bring on air a similar series. With writer Fran Striker and director James Jewell, Trendle sought to create a series that would "show that a political system could be riddled with corruption and that one man could successfully combat this white-collar lawlessness". Liking the acoustic possibilities of a bee sound, Trendle directed it be incorporated into the show. The team experimented with names, with Trendle liking The Hornet, but that name had been used elsewhere and could have posed rights problems. Colors including blue and pink were considered before the creators settled on green.

The vigilante nature of the hero's operation quickly resulted in the Green Hornet being declared an outlaw himself, and Britt Reid played to it. The Green Hornet became thought of as one of his city's biggest criminals, allowing him to walk into suspected racketeers' offices and ply them for information, or even demand a cut of their profits. In doing so, the Green Hornet usually provoked them to attack him to remove this competitor, giving him license to defeat and leave them for the police without raising suspicion as to his true motives.

He would be accompanied by his similarly masked chauffeur/bodyguard/enforcer, who was also Reid's valet, Kato, initially described as Japanese, and by 1939 as Filipino of Japanese descent. Specifically, in and up to 1939, in the series' opening narration, Kato was called Britt Reid's "Japanese valet" and from 1940 to '45 he was Reid's "faithful valet". However, by at least the June 1941 episode "Walkout for Profit", about 14 minutes into the episode, Reid specifically noted Kato having a Philippine origin and thus he became Reid's "Filipino valet" as of that point. When the characters were used in a pair of movie serials The Green Hornet and The Green Hornet Strikes Again!, the producers had Kato's nationality given as Korean.

== Narration ==
When the series began in 1936, the opening narration originally began with the announcer proclaiming that the Green Hornet "hunts the biggest of all game! Public enemies that even the G-Men cannot reach!", referring to FBI agents. Bureau chief J. Edgar Hoover objected to the line's implication that some crime fighting was beyond the abilities of the FBI, and it was changed to "Public enemies who try to destroy our America!"

During World War II, the opening narration was changed to:

... matches wits with racketeers and saboteurs, risking his life so that criminals and enemy spies will feel the weight of the law by the sting of the Green Hornet!

After the revving of the Black Beauty engine, the announcer would then say:

Ride with Britt Reid as he races toward another thrilling adventure! The Green Hornet strikes again!

After the thrumming of the hornet sound, Britt Reid would then call out:

Hurry, Kato! Here's where we smash a [type of criminal operation featured in the episode inserted] racket!

Later, this was changed to:

Ride with Britt Reid in the thrilling adventure [title of episode inserted]! The Green Hornet strikes again!

== Music ==
The radio show used Nikolai Rimsky-Korsakov's "Flight of the Bumblebee" as its theme music, blended with a hornet buzz created on a theremin.

Other famous classical works used as incidental music for the series included Hector Berlioz's Symphonie fantastique. Pyotr Ilyich Tchaikovsky's Pathetique Symphony and Francesca di Rimini, Rimsky-Korsakov's Scheherazade, Ludwig van Beethoven's Pastoral Symphony, Paul Dukas' The Sorcerer's Apprentice, Antonín Dvořák's "From the New World" Symphony. Modest Mussorgsky's Night on Bald Mountain, Gustav Holst's Mars, the Bringer of War from The Planets, the Overture to Richard Wagner's The Flying Dutchman; "The Infernal Dance of King Koshchei" from Igor Stravinsky's The Firebird was usually used after this announced part:

Stepping through a secret panel in the rear of the closet in his bedroom, Britt Reid and Kato went along a narrow passageway built within the walls of the apartment house itself. This passage led to an adjoining building which fronted on a dark side street. Though supposedly abandoned, this building served as the hiding place for the sleek, super-powered "Black Beauty", streamlined car of The Green Hornet. [Sound of Reid and Kato getting into car] Britt Reid pressed a button. [Sound of car starting] The great car roared into life. [Sound of revving engine] A section of the wall in front raised automatically, then closed as the gleaming "Black Beauty" sped into the darkness. [Sound of engine roaring and car driving away]

The original version (first used in episode 28 [May 3, 1936]) went like this:

When Britt Reid left his bedroom, he went through a secret passage between the walls of the apartment building into an old ramshackle structure front on another street. The fact that the rear of this place touched the fashionable apartment building, made the passage from one to the other possible to Britt Reid. On the first floor of this supposedly abandoned building was the motor car which Kato kept in perfect condition. The car with a motor of such power that it was that it was an easy matter to avoid pursuit. When the car was taken from its hiding place, photo-electric cells opened and closed cunningly disguised doors in the building. When Britt slipped beneath the steering wheel, he was no longer the happy-go-lucky young millionaire. He became grim and purposeful, willing to risk all in combat with criminals the law couldn't reach. He became the Green Hornet.

== Relationship to the Lone Ranger ==
One relatively minor aspect of the character that tends to be given limited exposure in the actual productions is his blood relationship to the Lone Ranger, another character created by Striker. The Lone Ranger's nephew was Dan Reid. In the Green Hornet radio shows, the Hornet's father was likewise named Dan Reid, making Britt Reid the Lone Ranger's grandnephew.

In the November 11, 1947, radio show episode "Too Hot to Handle", Britt tells his father that he, Britt, is the Green Hornet. After Dan's initial shock and anger, Dan refers to a vigilante "pioneer ancestor" of theirs that Dan himself had ridden alongside in Texas. As he expressed pride in and love for his son, the Lone Ranger theme briefly played in the background.

The Lone Ranger property was sold to another company in the 1950s, which resulted in a legal complication that precluded The Lone Ranger being directly associated with the Green Hornet. This complication was later resolved in a comic book cross-over published by Dynamite Entertainment.

== Other media representations ==
A number of the Pink Panther film satires included an Asian "valet" to the hero, alternately called "Kato" or "Cato", and one even included a customized car called "The Silver Hornet".

== Actors ==
The Green Hornet was played by:

- Al Hodge (who went on to play television's Captain Video) (1936–1943, 1945)
- Donovan Faust (1943)
- Bob Hall (1945–1947)
- Jack McCarthy (1947–1952)

The role of Kato was originated by Tokutaro Hayashi, renamed Raymond Toyo by initial series director James Jewell. He was later played by Rollon Parker, who also voiced "The Newsboy" at the conclusion of each episode who hawked the "Extra" edition of The Sentinel that carried the story of the weekly racket or spy ring being smashed, concluding with the likes of:

Sentinel extry! Paper! Police smash smuggling racket! Foreign diplomat involved! Read all about it! Green Hornet still at large! Sentinel extry, paper!

Michael Tolan and Paul Carnegie also played Kato in the radio series. Liz Weiss and Rube Weiss, who would later wed, appeared in a number of supporting roles on The Green Hornet, as they did on The Lone Ranger and Challenge of the Yukon. Charles Livingstone succeeded Jewell as director. Announcers who served as narrator of The Green Hornet were Fielden Farrington, Charles Wood, future broadcast journalist Mike Wallace, future ABC Radio president Hal Neal, and Bob Hite. Fred Foy was the series' final announcer/narrator from November 7, 1951, until the series' end on December 5, 1952.

== Other characters ==
Other major characters in the radio series included:

=== Friends/allies ===
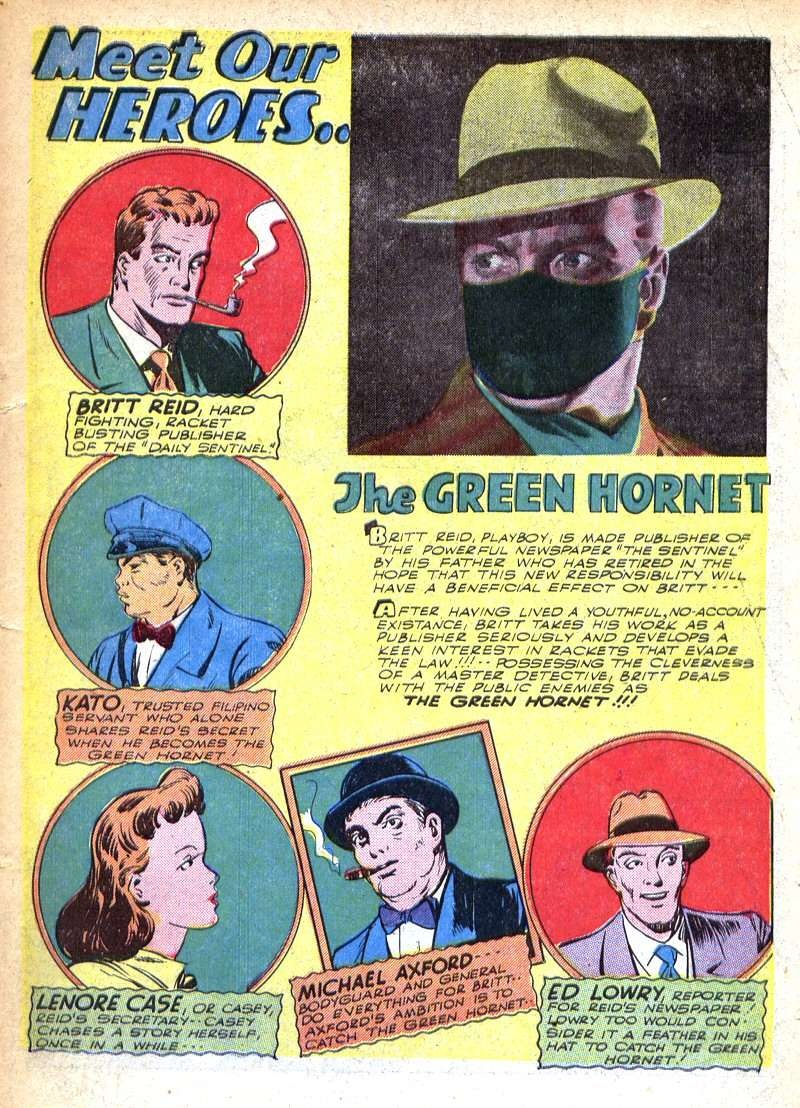
The Green Hornet friends/allies, Green Hornet Comics #7, June 1942 published by Harvey Comics

- Britt Reid's secretary Lenore "Casey" Case, formerly secretary to Britt's father Dan Reid before Britt took over as publisher of The Daily Sentinel, was played by James Jewell's sister Leonore Jewell Allman, the only actress to play Lenore Case during the entire run of the series. Miss Case made no secret of her admiration of the Green Hornet, was loyal to Britt (albeit sometimes exasperated by his "playboy" ways) and was the only one who could verbally put down Mike Axford even when he drove her to distraction. In the February 17, 1948, episode "Miss Case Keeps A Secret", she reveals that she has learned the true identity of The Green Hornet and becomes a trusted ally for the rest of the series.
- Michael Aloysius "Mike" Axford (originated by actor Jim Irwin until his death in 1938, then played by Gil Shea), was introduced in the series' premiere episode on January 31, 1936, as a bombastic former policeman who originally had been hired by Britt Reid's father as a bodyguard for Britt (until Britt found out his real purpose), but who drifted into becoming a reporter for The Daily Sentinel by virtue of his contacts at Police Headquarters (especially his best friend Sergeant Burke, known usually as "Sarge"). He was the most dedicated pursuer of the Green Hornet (while expressing his admiration for the Hornet's ability to both smash criminals and elude the authorities). Axford was temporarily written out of the series when on December 15, 1936, he was shot and critically wounded. In January 1938 when actor Jim Irwin suffered a stroke and later died in June of that year, Axford was written out of the series by Britt Reid's father ordering him to return to the West Coast. When Gil Shea took over the role (and played it until the radio series ended in 1952), Axford was brought back first in the form of a voiceover reading a letter in the June 22, 1939, episode "Pink Lemonade and Tan Bark" and on July 4, 1939 ("Put It On Ice"), returned in person.
- Bill Gunnigan, the Daily Sentinel's City Editor (mostly unknown, but played throughout 1938 by Fred Reto), always barking commands and sounding like he was on the verge of a heart-attack (especially when dealing with Mike Axford).
- Ed Lowry (played by Jack Petruzzi), one of The Sentinel's best reporters, who admired the Hornet. In 1945, Lowry was dropped from the series, but re-appeared in the October 20, 1946, episode "Killer Carson" after having served in the armed forces; he was welcomed back onto the Daily Sentinel staff by Britt Reid without hesitation.
- Another confidant, Police Commissioner James Higgins, did not come into existence until near the end of the series; he was introduced in the November 11, 1947, episode "Too Hot to Handle" as an old friend of Dan Reid's who was being blackmailed and who was rescued by the Green Hornet. The following week, Britt and Dan Reid confided the Hornet's secret identity to Higgins in the episode "The Man on Top" (November 18, 1947).

=== Enemies ===
- Oliver Perry, also known as "The Great Detective", was a famous private investigator who became one of The Green Hornet's most implacable foes. He first appeared on the December 26, 1944, episode "The Great Detective" and established a link between The Daily Sentinel and The Green Hornet, narrowing his suspects down to Britt Reid. Reid managed to throw Perry off the track, but Reid and Perry crossed paths again in San Francisco (April 4, 1945, "San Francisco Adventure") where Perry was providing security for a major peace conference. Perry returned in "The Return of Oliver Perry" (August 2, 1945) and again in "Unexpected Meeting" (August 23, 1945), but did not start going wrong until "The Last of Oliver Perry" (February 23, 1946) when he used a paroled criminal to try and steal evidence from Reid that would implicate him as The Hornet; when the plan backfires, Perry is disgraced. In "Grand Larceny on Wheels" (April 20, 1946), Perry not only has a car built that could match The Black Beauty for speed, but also impersonates The Hornet to try and trap Reid; this plan also backfires. In "Oliver Perry Tries Again" (September 7, 1946), Perry again tries to expose Reid as The Hornet, the failure of this plan results in Perry losing the cooperation of the local police. In "The Woman and Oliver Perry" (January 12, 1947) Perry uses a female operative in his plans: when this fails as well, Perry is stripped of his investigator's license. Because of his continued failures against The Hornet, Perry finally goes completely bad and in "Tickets to the Rosebowl" (December 30, 1947) gets into a major fist fight with The Hornet which he loses and is sent to prison. In "The Travis Case" (May 18, 1948), while still in prison, Perry has Linda Travis (who knows The Hornet's true identity) kidnapped; she escapes but is killed by Perry's thugs in a hit-and-run. The Hornet tracks down Perry's men and exposes Perry's involvement. In "Oliver Perry Closes In" (May 17, 1949), Perry, out on parole, kidnaps Britt Reid and takes him to the headquarters of a numbers racket that Reid is targeting in his editorials. Perry declares that he no longer wants to prove that Reid is the Green Hornet - he simply wants to kill him. However, Reid is saved and Perry goes back to prison for violating his parole. Perry escapes from prison in "Oliver Perry - Escaped Convict" (November 1, 1949) with the help of Communist Party members in a plot to murder Reid, which is thwarted and ends with Perry being returned to prison for good.

== Preservation ==
Like other radio programs of its day, The Green Hornet was broadcast live. Before May 1938, recordings were not made of the episodes. Regular recording of the live episodes, for the purpose of rebroadcasting by individual stations, began with the April 6, 1939, broadcast; recordings were made of every subsequent episode.
