= The Green Hornet (serial) =

1940s Universal movie serial based on The Green Hornet radio series

- Directed by: Ford Beebe; Ray Taylor
- Written by: Fran Striker (adapted from the radio show adventure series)
- Screenplay by: George H. Plympton (as Geo. H. Plympton); Basil Dickey; Morrison Wood (as Morrison C. Wood); Lyonel Margolies
- Produced by: Henry MacRae
- Starring: Gordon Jones; Wade Boteler; Keye Luke; Anne Nagel
- Cinematography: Jerome Ash; William A. Sickner
- Edited by: Irving Birnbaum; Joseph Gluck; Alvin Todd
- Production company: Universal Pictures
- Distributed by: Universal Pictures
- Release date: January 9, 1940
- Running time: 258 minutes (13 chapters); 99 minutes (movie)
- Country: United States
- Language: English

The Green Hornet is a 1940 black-and-white 13-chapter movie serial from Universal Pictures, produced by Henry MacRae, directed by Ford Beebe and Ray Taylor, starring Gordon Jones, Wade Boteler, Keye Luke, and Anne Nagel. The serial is based on The Green Hornet radio series by George W. Trendle and Fran Striker.

== Plot ==
Britt Reid, the new publisher of The Sentinel newspaper, secretly becomes the vigilante crime fighter The Green Hornet. Backing him up is his Korean valet and inventor Kato. Together, they investigate and expose several separate underworld rackets. During the course of 13 serial chapters, these high-profile events lead the Hornet and Kato into continued conflict with the henchmen of "The Chief", the hidden mastermind behind a 12-person criminal syndicate controlling those rackets.

== Cast ==
- Gordon Jones as Britt Reid and The Green Hornet
- Al Hodge as the (uncredited) voice of the Green Hornet
- Wade Boteler as Michael Axford
- Keye Luke as Kato. Kato is Korean in the serial rather than being the original Japanese character of the radio series, due to rising anti-Japanese sentiment around the world. This was two years prior to Japan's December 7, 1941 attack on Pearl Harbor and the United States' entry into World War II. The radio show dropped Kato's nationality from the introductory sequence, included passing references in dialogue to his character being Filipino, and years later, after the war, returned to the standard show introduction.
- Anne Nagel as Leonore Case
- Phillip Trent as Jasper Jenks
- Cy Kendall as Curtis Monroe aka 'The Chief'
- Stanley Andrews as Police Commissioner [Chs.1,5,8,9,13]
- Selmer Jackson as District Attorney [Chs.4,10]
- Joseph Crehan as Judge Stanton [Chs.1,9,10,13]
- Walter McGrail as Dean
- Gene Rizzi as Corey
- John Kelly as Pete Hawks
- Eddie Dunn as D.H. Sligby [Ch.7]
- Edward Earle as Felix Grant [Ch.1]
- Ben Taggart as Phil Bartlett [Chs.3-4]
- Clyde Dilson as Meadows [Ch.5]
- Jerry Marlowe as Bob Stafford [Chs.7,11]
- Frederick Vogeding as Max Gregory [Ch.11] (as Fredrik Vogeding)
- Raymond Bailey as Mr. West

== Chapter titles ==
1. The Tunnel of Terror
2. The Thundering Terror
3. Flying Coffins
4. Pillar of Flame
5. The Time Bomb
6. Highways of Peril
7. Bridge of Disaster
8. Dead or alive
9. The Hornet Trapped
10. Bullets and Ballots
11. Disaster Rides the Rails
12. Panic in the Zoo
13. Doom of the Underworld

== Alternative versions ==
In 1990, under the same title, GoodTimes Home Video released a feature-length version of the serial on VHS tape, re-edited from the footage in the last six chapters.

Under the title The Green Hornet: Movie Edition, VCI Entertainment released its version of the serial on DVD, January 11, 2011, which includes the first and last chapter and selected other chapters.

== Influence ==
The 1960s Batman television series was created because of the popularity of a re-release of Columbia's Batman serial. The success of both led to the production of a Green Hornet TV series, which was played as a straight action crime series, "in the tradition of its former presentations", rather than the campy Batman series. It was cancelled after only one season.
