= Michigan Regional Network =

American radio network

The Michigan Regional Network was an American regional radio network, in operation from 1933 to 1946. It is sometimes referred to as the "Michigan State Network" or the "Michigan Regional Network".

The "Michigan Radio Network" also refers to a modern radio network, unrelated to the original "Michigan Radio Network".

The network consisted of WXYZ: Detroit, WIBM: Jackson, WKZO: Kalamazoo, WJIM: Lansing, WBCM: Bay City, WFDF: Flint, WELL: Battle Creek and WASH-FM-WOOD: Grand Rapids.

The Michigan Regional Network was started by George W. Trendle on January 31, 1933. It was originally intended to become part of the Amalgamated Broadcasting System radio network which was established on September 25, 1933. However, the ABS network launch immediately proved to be a public relations disaster, and Amalgamated went out of business on October 28, 1933.

The Michigan Regional Network was the first to broadcast the Lone Ranger radio series produced by WXYZ, either beginning with, or shortly after its first episode on January 30, 1933. (Sources differ as to when the other stations in the Network began broadcasting WXYZ's Lone Ranger program, some indicate that it was with the first episode while many others indicate an unspecified later date).

The network used telephone lines to connect each station.

Beginning in November 1933, Silvercup Bread (Gordon Baking Company), which sponsored the Lone Ranger program, arranged for WGN, Chicago to broadcast the program. Early in 1934, WOR: New York and WLW: Cincinnati were added.

In September 1934, WOR, WGN, WLW, and WXYZ formalized their relationship with a contract, and the following month, the Mutual Broadcasting System was established.

In 1946, the newly formed American Broadcasting Company purchased the King-Trendle Broadcasting Company and its radio stations for $3.65 million. This sale was for the broadcast facilities (including WOOD, WXYZ and the Michigan Regional Network).
