= J. Thomas McCarthy =

American lawyer and leading expert in intellectual property and technology law

- Born: July 2, 1937 (age 89); Detroit, Michigan
- Title: Professor Emeritus, University of San Francisco School of Law

Academic background
- Education: University of Detroit; University of Michigan Law School

Academic work
- Discipline: Intellectual Property & Technology Law
- Notable works: McCarthy on Trademarks and Unfair Competition; The Rights of Publicity and Privacy (with Roger Schechter); McCarthy’s Desk Encyclopedia of Intellectual Property

J. Thomas McCarthy (born July 2, 1937 in Detroit, Michigan) is a Professor Emeritus at the University of San Francisco School of Law and an internationally recognized authority in the field of trademarks. He is the founding director of the McCarthy Institute for Intellectual Property and Technology Law. He has practiced, written, and taught in the field of trademarks and unfair competition and is a frequent speaker on the subject. He is the author of the authoritative work on intellectual property law, McCarthy on Trademarks and Unfair Competition.

McCarthy is a member of the California and U.S. Supreme Court bars and is admitted to practice before the United States Patent and Trademark Office.

== Education and personal life ==
He holds a degree in electrical engineering from the University of Detroit in 1960. He worked as an engineer for Chrysler Corporation Missile Division in the early days of the space program on the Redstone missile, a version of which was used to launch the Explorer I satellite in January 1958. He earned his law degree from the University of Michigan Law School in 1963.

He is the son of John Edward McCarthy.

He has been reported to be an avid watercolor painter.

== Legal career ==
For over twenty years until 2022, McCarthy was an of counsel consultant with the law firm of Morrison & Foerster in its San Francisco office. He was a member of the A.L.I. Advisory Committee involved in drafting the 1995 Restatement of the Law of Unfair Competition and a member of the Trademark Review Commission, which drafted the 1989 revisions to the Lanham Act. He served for several years on the Editorial Board of The Trademark Reporter.

The American Intellectual Property Lawyers Association has named McCarthy the most influential trademark expert of the 20th century. In 2010, American Lawyer listed McCarthy as one of the 25 most influential people in intellectual property. In their award, they wrote that "to say J. Thomas McCarthy wrote the book on trademark law is accurate, but something of an understatement."

In 2004, McCarthy lead the briefing team for Lasting in the United States Supreme Court case KP Permanent Make-Up, Inc. v. Lasting Impression I, Inc.. Lasting had taken the view, promoted by McCarthy in his treatise, that the fair use doctrine could not be a defense to trademark infringement when the use created a likelihood of confusion. However, there was a circuit split on this issue, and the Supreme Court decided against McCarthy's team. It held that confusion and fair use could coexist.

== Awards and lectures ==
McCarthy has been the recipient of many significant awards during his career.

- The 2003 President's Award of the International Trademark Association
- The 2000 Pattishall Medal for excellence in teaching trademark law from the Brand Names Education Foundation
- The 1997 Ladas Professional Author Award from the Brand Names Education Foundation
- The 1997 Centennial Award in Trademark Law from the American Intellectual Property Law Association
- The 1994 Jefferson Medal from the New Jersey Intellectual Property Law Association
- The 1979 Rossman Award of the Patent and Trademark Office Society
- The 1965 Watson Award of the American Intellectual Property Law Association.

In 2012, McCarthy was inducted into Intellectual Asset Management Magazine's Intellectual Property Hall of Fame. In 2018, he received the Lifetime Achievement Award from World Trademark Review magazine.

He has delivered a number of significant lectures including the 1999 Niro Lecture at DePaul University College of Law, the 1997 Tenzer Lecture at Cardozo Law School, the 1995 H.S. Manges Lecture at Columbia University, and the 1989 Boal Memorial Lecture for the Brand Names Education Foundation at Northwestern University. In 1994, he was the Biebel & French Distinguished Visiting Scholar in Law & Technology at the University of Dayton.

== Publications ==
McCarthy is the author of the seven volume treatise McCarthy on Trademarks and Unfair Competition, (5th edition Thomson Reuters) which has been relied upon as authority in over 7000 judicial opinions, including 16 opinions of the United States Supreme Court. The treatise was first published in 1973 in two volumes.

Other books written by McCarthy include the two-volume treatise The Rights of Publicity and Privacy (with Roger Schechter) and McCarthy’s Desk Encyclopedia of Intellectual Property (Third Edition), (with Schechter & Franklyn).

== McCarthy Institute ==
McCarthy is the founding director of the McCarthy Institute for Intellectual Property and Technology Law. The institute is now located at the Arizona State University Sandra Day O'Connor College of Law. The institute focuses on IP law, the technologies powering brand development, and the consumer behaviors that make up brand perception.
