= Black Mask (1996 film) =

1996 Hong Kong film by Daniel Lee

- Theatrical release poster

Chinese name
- Traditional Chinese: 黑俠
- Simplified Chinese: 黑侠
Transcriptions
Standard Mandarin
- Hanyu Pinyin: Hēi Xiá
Yue: Cantonese
- Jyutping: Hak1 Hap6
- Directed by: Daniel Lee
- Screenplay by: Teddy Chan; Tsui Hark; Koan Hui; Joe Ma
- Story by: Li Chi-Tak; Pang Chi-ming
- Produced by: Tsui Hark
- Starring: Jet Li; Lau Ching-wan; Karen Mok; Françoise Yip; Patrick Lung; Anthony Wong
- Cinematography: Tony Cheung
- Edited by: Cheung Ka-fai
- Music by: Teddy Robin
- Production companies: Win's Entertainment; Film Workshop
- Distributed by: China Star Entertainment Group; Win's Entertainment
- Release date: 9 November 1996
- Running time: 99 minutes
- Country: Hong Kong
- Language: Cantonese
- Budget: HK$60 million (US$8 million)
- Box office: US$26 million (HK$200 million)

Black Mask (Chinese: 黑俠) is a 1996 Hong Kong superhero martial arts film directed by Daniel Lee, and produced by Tsui Hark, who also wrote with Koan Hui, Teddy Chan, and Joe Ma. The action director was Yuen Woo-ping. The film stars Jet Li, Lau Ching-wan, Karen Mok, Françoise Yip, Patrick Lung, and Anthony Wong. The film was released theatrically in Hong Kong on 9 November 1996. In 1999, the film was dubbed in English and released in the United States by Artisan Entertainment.

The film is an adaptation of the 1992 manhua Black Mask by Li Chi-Tak. In 2002, it was followed by a sequel, Black Mask 2: City of Masks, starring Andy On and directed by Tsui Hark.

In homage to The Green Hornet, Black Mask wears a domino mask and chauffeur's cap in the same style as Kato (played by Bruce Lee) from the television series. The Black Mask is even compared to Kato in a news reporter scene.

== Plot ==
Tsui Chik (or Simon in the American version) tries to lead a quiet life as a librarian. However, he is really a former test subject for a highly secretive supersoldier project and the instructor of a special commando unit dubbed "701". The 701 squad is used for many government missions, but after one of the agents kills a team of policemen in an uncontrollable rage, the government decides to abort the project and eliminate all the subjects. Tsui Chik helped the surviving 701 agents flee the extermination attempt. Having escaped, Tsui Chik went separate ways from his team and lived in Hong Kong. Later at night he discovers that the rest of the team were responsible for a violent crime spree that was beyond the capability of the local police. He sets out to get rid of them, donning a mask and hat using the superhero alias of The Black Mask. Having lost the ability to feel pain due to the surgery performed on the super-soldiers by the military, Black Mask and his former team are almost invulnerable.

== Cast ==
- Jet Li as Tsui Chik / Black Mask (Simon)
- Lau Ching-wan as Inspector Shek Wai-Ho (Rock)
- Karen Mok as Tracy Lee
- Françoise Yip as Yeuk-Lan
- Patrick Lung as Commander Hung Kuk
- Anthony Wong as King Kau
- Xiong Xin-xin as Jimmy
- Moses Chan as 701 Squad Member
- Henry Fong Ping as Ricky Tai
- Shut Mei-yee as Chief of Library
- Szeto Wai-cheuk as Szeto
- Chung King-fai as Commissioner of Police
- Ken Lok as Sergeant Crap
- Lawrence Ah Mon as Operating Room Doctor
- Dion Lam as Sour
- Mike Ian Lambert as 701 Squad Member
- Nunzio Caponio as 701 Squad Member

== Release ==
Black Mask grossed over US$26 million (HK$200 million) at the worldwide box office, including US$10 million in Asia. Released on 9 November 1996, Black Mask grossed a moderate HK$13,286,788 (US$1,717,915) during its Hong Kong box office run.

In May 1999, home video distributor Artisan Entertainment released a re-edited version in the United States theatrically. It grossed a reasonable US$4,449,692 ($4,545 per screen) in its opening weekend, and grossed a total of US$12,504,289.

DVD sales for Black Mask totalled US$48.57 million (HK$380 million) in North America and more than US$50 million worldwide. Lionsgate Home Entertainment (successor to Artisan when it acquired in 2003) released a Blu-ray version in the United States on 2 September 2008.

== Alternate versions ==
The film is recognised for having multiple versions: Hong Kong (Cantonese), Taiwanese (Mandarin), English (export), United Kingdom (distributed by BMG) and United States (distributed by Artisan Entertainment).

=== Hong Kong/Taiwanese versions ===
For the Cantonese version, the original Mei Ah DVD is cut for gore, but the remastered DVD restores a scene of blood-spurting. The French DVD features the Hong Kong version in the correct form, but contains no English subtitles.

Both Hong Kong and Taiwanese releases maintain the green-tinting of the film.

=== English versions ===
An English version similar to the Hong Kong version was produced for export (featured on the Spanish DVD), but BMG and Artisan decided to make their own. Whilst only occasionally replacing music on the UK release, Artisan commissioned a brand-new English Hip Hop soundtrack – therefore, removing any reference to the original (despite using excerpts from it in their trailers). Despite a tendency of trimming non-action scenes, the Artisan and BMG versions not only contain all gory content, but also some non-violent scenes not found in any other version:

1. Tsui Chik looking for Inspector Shek.
2. A few shots of Black Mask's hide-out.
3. Inspector Shek advising Yeuk Lan to seek Tsui Chik.

== Reception ==
Lawrence Van Gelder of The New York Times called it "long on flying bodies, bullets and blood and short on credibility". Marc Savlov of The Austin Chronicle rated it 3/5 stars and called it "a bloodily exhilarating piece of hyper-kinetic filmmaking". Nathan Rabin of The A.V. Club wrote: "While never reaching the manic highs of Chan's best work, Black Mask is an exciting, lightning-fast introduction to one of Hong Kong's biggest and most charismatic stars."
