= Tom Quest =

Fictional character

- Volume 1
- Author: Fran Striker
- Country: United States
- Language: English
- Genre: Adventure
- Publisher: Grosset & Dunlap (#1-6); Clover Books (#7-8)
- Published: 1947-1955
- Media type: Print

Tom Quest is the central character in a series of eight adventure novels for adolescent boys written by Lone Ranger series author Fran Striker. The first six novels were published by Grosset & Dunlap between 1947 and 1952. The series was later reprinted by Clover Books, when #7-8 were published. The six Grosset & Dunlap titles were issued in dust jacket; the Clover Books reprints and their two original titles have picture covers and no dust jackets. The plot of volume #8 was lifted from Striker's Gene Autry and the Redwood Pirates.

Tom Quest, the son of a famous scientist and explorer, finds adventure with newspaperman Whiz Walton and a gargantuan Texan named Gulliver. A double spiral symbol, designed by Tom's father, appears on the spine of the books, and sometimes figures in the plot. In the first book, Tom discovers that his father, long believed dead, may still be alive, and, in the second, Tom, Whiz, and Gulliver travel to Central America in search of him. The third and fourth books are also loosely connected, after which each book stands alone. The plots usually involve some kind of criminal activity thwarted by Tom and his pals.

== Books in series ==
The Sign of the Spiral (1947) Hamilton Quest, Tom’s father, disappeared in Peru ten years ago. When a newspaper photo shows a spiral design Tom, along with friends Gulliver and Whiz Walton, begin a search to find Mr. Quest.

The Telltale Scar (1947) Tom, Gulliver and Whiz Walton are in Peru searching for clues to Mr. Quest’s whereabouts. But someone is thwarting their efforts. Tom discovers a native with a scar on his hand – and he saw that same scar thousands of miles away.

The Clue of the Cypress Stump (1948) While on vacation in Florida Tom and Gulliver help reporter Whiz Walton locate a cache of stolen platinum. Clues include a “ghost” ship and a sketch of a cypress stump.

The Secret of the Lost Mesa (1949) During a Mexico vacation Tom, Gulliver and Whiz find a waterproof camera floating in the water. The developed film shows photos of an ancient Aztec city unknown to the modern world. But someone wants to make sure the three explorers don’t reach the hidden city.

The Hidden Stone Mystery (1950) A strange stone is discovered in North Dakota, Hamilton Quest declares it an important Native American artifact, but newspaper headlines are calling Mr. Quest a fraud. Tom, Gulliver and Whiz travel to a Mandan village and question Tom’s friend, Chief Wahkee, but suspect the Chief is being pressured to keep important information from the investigators.

The Secret of Thunder Mountain (1952) Tom is vacationing on Gulliver’s Texas ranch and picks up some unusual rocks on Thunder Mountain. He sends them to his father, who says they contain gold, but Mr. Hamilton tells Whiz Walton to make sure Tom doesn’t return to Thunder Mountain for more rocks.

The Clue of the Inca Luck Piece (1955) Strange markings on the back of an Inca gold medallion may lead to a source for uranium in Peru. Government agents believe the medallion is a clue to finding the location of a hidden uranium mine. Hamilton Quest works to decipher the markings, and enemy agents try to steal the gold piece.

The Mystery of the Timber Giant (1955) A lumber syndicate is trying to force Half-pint Hooligan into selling his land for less than its worth. Tom, Gulliver and Wiz travel to the timber area and discover most people are willing to give them any information. But one man tells the trio that Hooligan isn’t the only land owner being pressured to sell to the lumber syndicate.
