= Green Hornet =

Fictional character

The Green Hornet
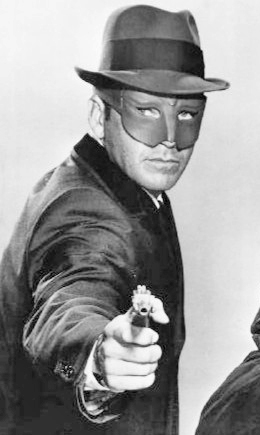
- Van Williams as the Green Hornet.

Publication information
- First appearance: The Green Hornet radio program (January 31, 1936)
- Created by: George W. Trendle; Fran Striker

In-story information
- Alter ego: Britt Reid
- Partnerships: Kato
- Abilities: Genius-level intellect; Expert detective; Skilled martial artist

The Green Hornet is a superhero created in 1936 by George W. Trendle and Fran Striker, with input from radio director James Jewell.

Since his 1930s radio debut, the character has appeared in numerous serialized dramas in a wide variety of media. The Green Hornet appeared in film serials in the 1940s, The Green Hornet television series in the 1960s, (which costarred Bruce Lee in his first adult role), multiple comic book series from the 1940s onwards, and a film in 2011.

The franchise is owned by Green Hornet, Inc., which licenses the property across a wide variety of media that includes comics, films, TV shows, radio and books. As of the 2010s, the comic-book rights are licensed to Dynamite Entertainment.

== History ==
Though various incarnations sometimes change details, in most versions the Green Hornet is the alter ego of Britt Reid (/riːd/), the wealthy young publisher of the Daily Sentinel newspaper. By night, clad in a long green overcoat, gloves, green fedora hat and green mask, Reid fights crime as the mysterious vigilante known as "The Green Hornet". He is accompanied by his loyal and similarly masked partner and confidant, Kato, who drives their technologically advanced car, the "Black Beauty". Though both the police and the general public believe the Hornet to be a wanted criminal, Reid uses that perception to help him infiltrate the underworld, leaving behind for the police the criminals and any incriminating evidence he has found.

In the original radio incarnation, Britt Reid is the son of Dan Reid Jr., the nephew of the Lone Ranger (whose first name is never given, contrary to later articles), making the Green Hornet the great-nephew of the Ranger. The relationship is alluded to at least once in the radio shows, when Dan Reid visits his son to question him on why Britt has never captured the Hornet. On learning the truth behind his son's dual identity, Dan Reid recalls his days riding with his uncle, as the William Tell Overture plays briefly and softly in the background.

== Radio series ==
The character debuted in The Green Hornet, an American radio program that premiered on January 31, 1936, on WXYZ, the same local Detroit station that originated its companion shows The Lone Ranger and Challenge of the Yukon. Beginning on April 12, 1938, the station supplied the series to the Mutual Broadcasting System radio network, and then to NBC Blue and its successors, the Blue Network and ABC, from November 16, 1939, through September 8, 1950. It returned from September 10 to December 5, 1952. It was sponsored by General Mills from January to August 1948, and by Orange Crush in its brief 1952 run.

== Film ==
=== Serials ===
The Green Hornet was adapted into two movie serials, 1940's The Green Hornet and, in 1941, The Green Hornet Strikes Again! Disliking the treatment Republic gave The Lone Ranger in two serials, George W. Trendle took his property to Universal Pictures, and was much happier with the results. The first serial, titled simply The Green Hornet (1940), stars Gordon Jones in the title role, albeit dubbed by original radio Hornet Al Hodge whenever the hero's mask was in place, while The Green Hornet Strikes Again! (1941) stars Warren Hull. Keye Luke, who played the "Number One Son" in the Charlie Chan films, plays Kato in both. Also starring in both serials are Anne Nagel as Lenore Case, Britt Reid's secretary, and Wade Boteler as Mike Axford, a reporter for the Daily Sentinel, the newspaper that Reid owns and publishes. Ford Beebe directed both serials, partnered by Ray Taylor on The Green Hornet and John Rawlins on The Green Hornet Strikes Again!, with George H. Plympton and Basil Dickey contributing to the screenplays for both serials. The Green Hornet runs for 13 chapters while The Green Hornet Strikes Again! has 15 installments, with the Hornet and Kato smashing a different racket in each chapter. In each serial, they are all linked to a single major crime syndicate which is itself put out of business in the finale, while the radio program had the various rackets completely independent of each other.

=== The Green Hornet (2006) ===
A 10-minute 2006 French short film titled Le frelon vert is based on the Green Hornet.

=== The Green Hornet (2011) ===
A film version of the character had been contemplated since the 1990s, with Universal Pictures and Miramax each attempting to develop a film. Sony Pictures announced plans for a feature film of the superhero in 2008. Eventually, Sony Pictures, through its subsidiary Columbia Pictures, released an action-comedy Green Hornet feature on January 14, 2011, starring Jay Chou and Seth Rogen, who co-wrote the script with Superbad co-writer Evan Goldberg. It was directed by Michel Gondry. Jay Chou co-starred as Kato. Also starring were Cameron Diaz as Lenore Case, Edward James Olmos as Mike Axford, David Harbour as Frank Scanlon, Christoph Waltz as the main villain Benjamin Chudnofsky, and Tom Wilkinson as James Reid.

=== Reboot ===
In 2016, Paramount Pictures and Chernin Entertainment acquired the rights to The Green Hornet and started preliminary work on developing a reboot with Gavin O'Connor as producer and director of the film and Sean O'Keefe as writer. In 2020, Amasia Entertainment gained the rights of the Green Hornet and officially teamed with Universal Pictures for the reboot titled Green Hornet and Kato with David Koepp writing the script. On June 23, 2022, Deadline reported that Leigh Whannell will direct the reboot.

== Television ==
=== The Green Hornet (1966–1967) ===
The Green Hornet is a television series shown on the ABC U.S. television network. It aired for the 1966–1967 television season and stars Van Williams as both the Green Hornet and Britt Reid, and Bruce Lee as Kato. With his insistence on using his martial arts skills, Bruce Lee stole the show as Kato. This was the first time Asian martial arts fighting was seen on American TV. The show launched Bruce Lee's career as a popular actor in the US as well as in Hong Kong. Audience interest even led to Van Williams asking to learn some martial art moves.

Williams and Lee's Green Hornet and Kato appear as anti-heroes in the second season of the Batman TV series in the two-part episode "A Piece of the Action" / "Batman's Satisfaction". The episode ended with Batman himself questioning whether or not the Green Hornet was really a criminal. Unlike the "campy" version of Batman, this version of The Green Hornet was played more seriously.

=== Animated series ===
In July 2020, Kevin Smith and WildBrain announced plans to develop a Green Hornet animated series set in the present day and focused on a reimagined Green Hornet and female Kato. On February 28, 2023, Smith confirmed in an episode of Fatman Beyond that the series would be 10 episodes.

== Comic books ==
=== Early comics ===
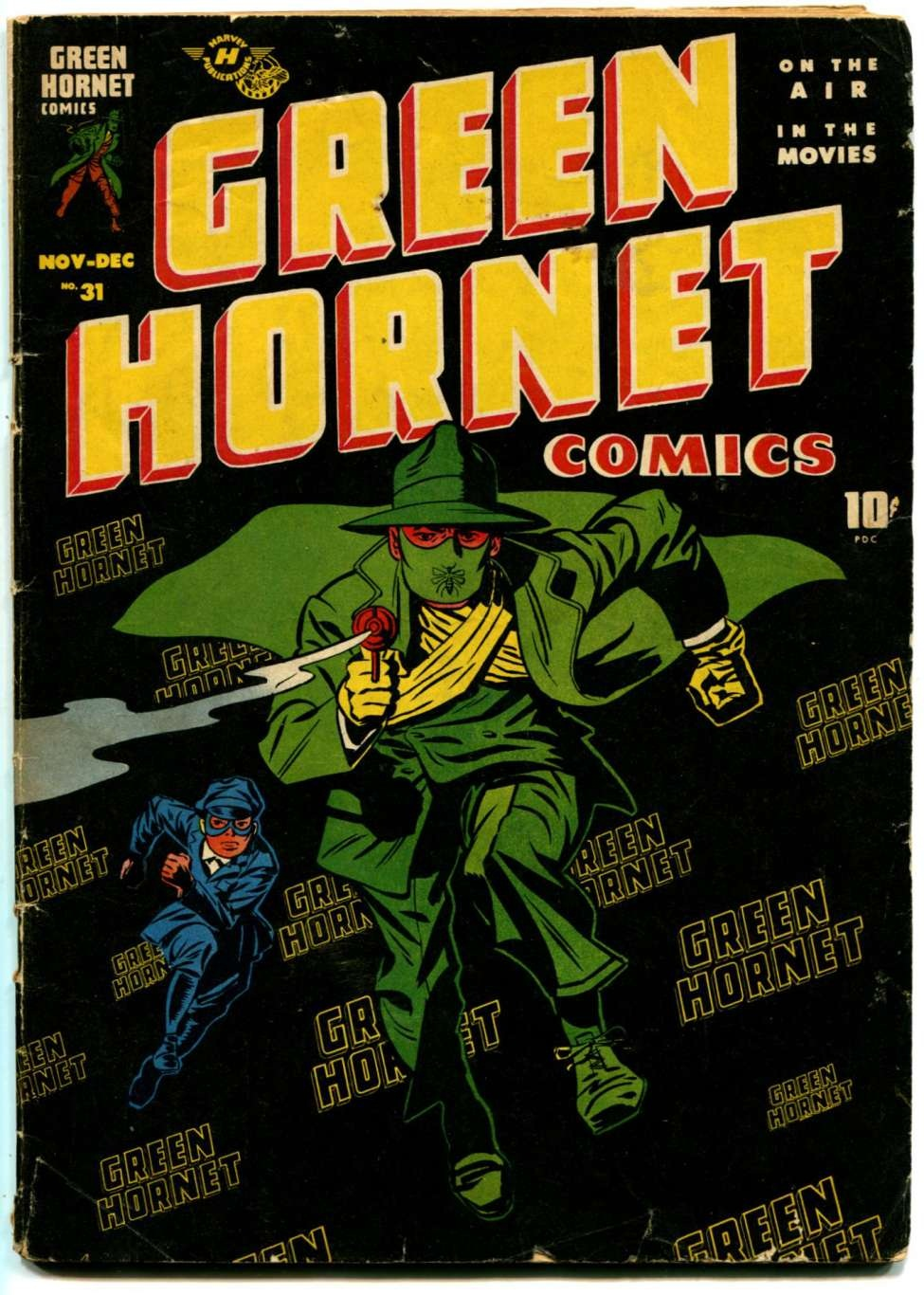
Green Hornet Comics #31 (November-December 1946), art by Al Avison

Green Hornet comic books began in December 1940. The series, titled Green Hornet Comics published by Helnit Comics with the writing attributed to Fran Striker, being illustrated by Bert Whitman Associates. The stories were loosely based on episodes of the radio show. This series ended after six issues.

Several months later, Harvey Comics launched its own version, beginning with issue #7. This series lasted until issue #47 in 1949; during that time it also changed its title twice: first to Green Hornet Fights Crime (issue #34) and later to Green Hornet, Racket Buster (issue #44).

Harvey additionally used the character in the public-service one-shot War Victory Comics in 1942, and gave him one adventure in each of two issues of All-New Comics, #13 (where he was also featured on the cover) and #14, in 1946.

In 1953, several months after the radio series ended, Dell Comics published a one-shot with the character (officially entitled Four Color #496). Both stories therein share titles with late-era radio episodes ("The Freightyard Robberies", June 23, 1949; and "[The] Proof of Treason", October 17, 1952) and might be adaptations.

In 1967, Gold Key Comics produced a 3-issue series based on the TV show.

=== NOW Comics ===
In 1989, NOW Comics introduced a line of Green Hornet comics, initially written by Ron Fortier and illustrated by Jeff Butler. It attempted to reconcile the different versions of the character into a multigenerational epic. This took into account the character's ancestral connection to The Lone Ranger, though due to the legal separation of the two properties, his mask covered his entire face (as in the Republic serials) and he could not be called by name. In this interpretation, the Britt of the radio series had fought crime as the Hornet in the 1930s and 1940s before retiring. In NOW's first story, in Green Hornet #1 (November 1989), set in 1945, the nationality of the original Kato (named in this comic series Ikano Kato) is given as Japanese, but because of the American policy regarding the Japanese minority during World War II, Reid referred to Kato as Filipino in order to prevent Kato's being sent to an American internment camp.

The NOW comics considered the 1960s television character as the namesake nephew of the original, 1930s–1940s Britt Reid, referred to as "Britt Reid II" in the genealogy, who took up his uncle's mantle after a friend is assassinated. Britt Reid II eventually retired due to a heart attack, and Kato—given the first name Hayashi, after that of the first actor to play Kato on radio—goes on to become a star of ninja movies. The NOW comics established Hayashi Kato as Ikano Kato's son. Britt Reid's nephew, Paul Reid, a concert pianist, takes on the role of the Hornet after his older brother Alan, who had first taken on the mantle, is killed on his debut mission. Paul Reid is assisted by Mishi Kato, Hayashi's much-younger half-sister who was trained by Ikano Kato. Her being female caused problems between the publishers and the rights-holders, who withdrew approval of that character and mandated the return of "the Bruce Lee Kato". After Mishi's departure—explained as orders from her father to replace an injured automobile designer at the Zürich, Switzerland, facility of the family corporation, Nippon Today—Hayashi Kato returned to crime fighting alongside the Paul Reid Green Hornet. Mishi Kato returned in volume two as the Crimson Wasp, following the death of her Swiss police-officer fiancé, on orders of a criminal leader. In NOW's final two issues, vol. 2, #39–40, a fourth Kato—Kono Kato, grandson of Ikano and nephew of Hayashi and Mishi—took over as Paul Reid's fellow masked vigilante. The comics also introduced Diana Reid, the original Britt Reid's daughter, who had become district attorney after the TV series' Frank Scanlon had retired. A romantic relationship eventually formed between her and Hayashi Kato.

NOW's first series began in 1989 and lasted 14 issues. Volume Two began in 1991 and lasted 40 issues, ending in 1995 when the publisher went out of business. Kato starred solo in a four-issue miniseries in 1991, and a two-issue follow-up in 1992, both written by Mike Baron. He also wrote a third, first announced as a two-issue miniseries, then as a graphic novel, but it was never released due to the company's collapse.

Tales of the Green Hornet, consisting of nine issues spread out over three volumes (two, four, and three issues, respectively), presented stories of the two previous Hornets. Volume One featured Green Hornet II, and its story was plotted by Van Williams, star of the 1960s TV series, and scripted by Bob Ingersoll. The follow-ups were written by James Van Hise. Other miniseries included the three-issue The Green Hornet: Solitary Sentinel; the four-issue Sting of the Green Hornet, set during World War II and Clint McElroy's three-issue Dark Tomorrow (June–August 1993), featuring a criminal Green Hornet in 2080 being fought by the Kato of that era.

Discounting depictions of the cars utilized by the 1940s and 1960s Hornets, there were two versions of the Black Beauty used in the NOW comic series. The first was based on the Pontiac Banshee. The second was a four-door sedan based on the eleventh-generation Oldsmobile 98 Touring Sedan.

=== Dynamite Entertainment ===
In March 2009, Dynamite Entertainment acquired the license to produce Green Hornet comic books. Its first release was a miniseries written by Kevin Smith with pencils by Jonathan Lau. Revamped in 2010 as an ongoing series set in modern times, the new Green Hornet stars Britt Reid Jr., the rebellious and spoiled son of Britt Reid Sr., now a retired industrial and family man. When Britt Sr. is slain by the Black Hornet, a yakuza mobster whose family was shamed by the original Green Hornet, the aging but still fit Kato returns. With his daughter, Mulan Kato, who has taken over the costumed identity of her father, he brings Britt Jr. to China for training and safekeeping as he becomes the new Green Hornet. Writer Jai Nitz also wrote Green Hornet: Parallel Lives, a miniseries prequel to the 2011 Green Hornet feature film.

In 2013, an eight-issue miniseries called Masks brought together famous heroes from the pulp era. It starred The Shadow, The Green Hornet and Kato, The Spider and a 1930s descendant of Zorro. It was written by Chris Roberson with art by Alex Ross and Dennis Calero.

Kevin Smith and Ralph Garman wrote a crossover title, Batman '66 meets the Green Hornet, released in June 2014.

A crossover with Miss Fury was announced in August 2024.

In a 2018 series written by Amy Chu, Mulan Kato becomes the Green Hornet after Britt Reid Jr. mysteriously disappears.

== Comic strip ==
In 1939, the Bell Syndicate proposed a The Green Hornet comic strip, written by Fran Striker and illustrated by Bert Withman, but the project did not please George Trendle and was canceled.

In 2018, the Green Hornet appeared in newspaper strips as a guest-star in Dick Tracy by Mike Curtis (script) and Joe Staton (art), continuing the trend of Tracy stories reviving characters from defunct strips.

== Prose fiction ==
Western Publishing subsidiary Whitman Books released four works of text fiction based on the character, targeting younger readers. There were three entries in the children's line of profusely illustrated Big Little Books, The Green Hornet Strikes!, The Green Hornet Returns, and The Green Hornet Cracks Down, in 1940, 1941 and 1942, respectively, all attributed to Fran Striker. In 1966, their line for older juveniles included Green Hornet: Case of the Disappearing Doctor by Brandon Keith, a tie-in to the television series. At about the same time, Dell Publishing released a mass-market paperback, The Green Hornet in The Infernal Light by Ed Friend, not only derived from the small-screen production as well, but, "allegedly based on one of the TV episodes".

In 2009, Moonstone Books gained the prose license and has released three Green Hornet anthologies as part of its "Chronicles" line: The Green Hornet Chronicles, The Green Hornet Casefiles, and The Green Hornet: Still at Large.

=== Video games ===
The Green Hornet and Kato appears in The Green Hornet: Wheels of Justice (2010) for iPhone, based on the film.

== Merchandising ==
Few examples of Green Hornet merchandise have appeared since the 1960s. To coincide with the 2011 movie, Factory Entertainment produced six-inch action figures and a die cast Black Beauty, among other collectibles. Hollywood Collectibles has made a full-size prop gas gun replica. Mezco Toyz has made a set of 12-inch action figures, with the prototypes donated to the Museum of the Moving Image.

CKE Restaurants, Inc., the parent company of Carl's Jr. and Hardee's, teamed with the studio on a promotional marketing partnership that included commercials featuring Seth Rogen and Jay Chou in character as the Green Hornet and Kato; a beverage promotion with Dr. Pepper; The Green Hornet food items, kids' meal toys, and employee uniforms; and a contest with the grand prize of the Black Beauty car from the film.

In 2012, Factory Entertainment released screen accurate replicas of the Hornet Sting, Gas Gun, and Kato's Dart from the 1960s television series. A plaque signed by Van Williams was included in a limited run of "Signature Edition" replicas.

In June 2018, the toy company Funko released a Funko Pop figure of the Green Hornet as a Specialty Series figure. This was later followed up with multiple Funko Pop figures of the Green Hornet and Kato, released as exclusives at San Diego Comic-Con and New York Comic Con. In January 2020, Funko announced Green Hornet and Kato figures as part of their initial SODA vinyl figure offerings with a limited run of 6000 each.

In late 2021, Diamond Select Toys announced the start of a new line of Green Hornet and Kato collectible merchandise in partnership with The Green Hornet Inc. and the Bruce Lee Family. Their line of collectibles include a mini bust of Kato and various action figures of Kato in different outfits.

In 2022, Aurora Plastics Corporation, under their Polar Lights brand, reissued a model of the Black Beauty car from the 1960s television series. Aluminum Model Toys released their own model kit of the Black Beauty in the same year.

== In other popular culture ==
=== Art, entertainment, and media ===
- Aretha Franklin's 1967 album I Never Loved a Man the Way I Love You contains the song "Save Me" which includes the lyric "Calling the Caped Crusader, Green Hornet, Kato, too / I'm in so much trouble I don't know what to do".
- The 1960s cartoon series Batfink is a parody of both Batman and the Green Hornet. Batfink rides in a pink vehicle called the Battilac, which is driven by his assistant Karate who is a martial artist.
- Bill Cosby parodied The Green Hornet in his c. 1970 syndicated five-minute daily radio program, The Brown Hornet, which he revived in the late 1970s for his Fat Albert and the Cosby Kids cartoon show.
- In 1973 George Garabedian Productions on MARK56 Records released an LP of two of the radio shows. The cover included a green AMC Hornet.
- Inspector Clouseau's valet/houseboy is called Cato (spelled with a "C" instead of a "K"), and his car in the film Revenge of the Pink Panther (1978) is a heavily modified Citroën 2CV, "The Silver Hornet".
- The 1993 American semi-fictionalized biographical film Dragon: The Bruce Lee Story, in which Jason Scott Lee portrayed Bruce Lee, features scenes involving the filming of the 1966 Green Hornet television series. Van Williams, who starred in the TV series, appeared in the film as the show's director.
- A 1994 Hong Kong film, The Green Hornet (Qing feng xia), starred Kar Lok Chin as a Kato-like masked hero called the Green Hornet. In one scene, he is reminded of his predecessors, one of whom is represented by a mannequin of Bruce Lee in his TV Kato costume. The film's director, Lam Ching Ying, was a friend of Bruce Lee.
- Black Mask is a 1996 Hong Kong action film starring Jet Li. The film is an adaptation of the 1992 manhua Black Mask by Li Chi-Tak. In the film, in homage to The Green Hornet, Black Mask wears a domino mask and chauffeur's cap in the same style as Kato from the series. The Black Mask is even compared to Kato in one scene. In 2002, it was followed by a sequel, Black Mask 2: City of Masks starring Andy On.
- The 2003 film Kill Bill: Volume 1 uses Billy May's theme from the 1960s television series in a sequence where the Bride goes to Tokyo in search of O-Ren Ishii. The Crazy 88 wear masks resembling Bruce Lee's Kato mask.
- Lee also appears as Kato in the biographical series The Legend of Bruce Lee (2008), starring Danny Chan.
- In the film Legend of the Fist: The Return of Chen Zhen, released late September 2010 in Asia and early 2011 in the United States, there is a large feature of the Green Hornet. The subplot consist of the main character Chen Zhen (played by Donnie Yen) dressing up as a mask vigilante (based on Kato) to stop Japanese assassinations and to protect the people.
- In a 2014 episode of Sesame Street, the Green Hornet was spoofed in their "Numeric Con" segment as "The Green Four-net" (performed by John Kennedy). When Elmo dressed as Dark Nine and Leela dressed as Princess Three-ah were looking for Elmo's favorite number hero Green Lan-Ten to count to 10 with, they come across the Green Four-Net who notes that this mix up with him happens a lot. The Green Four-net breaks the bad news to Elmo and Leela stating that the Green Lan-Ten had called a cab and went home which later caused Leela to advise Elmo to be flexible as he instead counts to 10 with Cap-Ten Kirk.
- In 2016, Season 6 of The Venture Bros. introduces parody characters of Green Hornet and Kato from 1960s television series in the form of the masked crime-fighter Blue Morpho and his assistant Kano in a flashback, the latter having later become a member of the original Team Venture. It is also revealed that Blue Morpho was the father of the orphaned villain Monarch and he and Henchman 21 later take on the roles of the Blue Morpho and Kano respectively.
- The 2019 film Once Upon a Time in Hollywood depicts a sequence where fictional stuntman Cliff Booth fights Bruce Lee (Mike Moh) on the set of the Green Hornet 1960s television series.
- In 2023, Toyota featured Billy May's theme from the 1960s television series in a Prius commercial as a part of their “This is Prius Now” campaign.

=== People ===
- Mark Tennant, a Calgary alderman, was nicknamed "The Green Hornet" during World War II. During his military service with The Calgary Highlanders, it was said he "always knew where the bad guys were" during his tours as an orderly officer.

== See also ==
- Flight of the Bumblebee
