= Black Mask 2: City of Masks =

2002 Hong Kong film by Tsui Hark

- Film poster
- Directed by: Tsui Hark
- Screenplay by: Jeff Black; Charles Cain
- Story by: Julien Carbon; Laurent Courtiaud; Tsui Hark
- Produced by: Tsui Hark; Charles Heung
- Starring: Andy On; Tobin Bell; Traci Lords
- Cinematography: Horace Wong; William Yim
- Edited by: Angie Lam; Marco Mak
- Music by: J.M. Logan
- Production companies: One Hundred Years of Film; Film Workshop
- Distributed by: China Star Entertainment Group
- Release dates: 24 December 2002 (U.S.); 9 January 2003 (Hong Kong)
- Running time: 102 minutes
- Country: Hong Kong
- Languages: English; Cantonese

Black Mask 2: City of Masks (黑俠II) is a 2002 Hong Kong superhero film directed by Tsui Hark. It is the sequel to the 1996 Hong Kong film Black Mask, starring Jet Li. Andy On took over the role of Black Mask after Li opted not to return. The film also starred Tobin Bell, Jon Polito, Tyler Mane, Rob Van Dam, Traci Lords, and Scott Adkins. The martial arts choreography was directed by Yuen Woo-ping.

== Overview ==
Black Mask 2 serves as a sequel to the 1996 Hong Kong film Black Mask, which was based on the 1992 manhua Black Mask by Li Chi-Tak. However, apart from the main character, the film is largely unrelated in story to the original and follows Black Mask attempting to find a cure for his supersoldier powers while being tracked by his creator, a giant brain. The film has a fantastical superhero tone, set in a futuristic city with a plot involving stopping a mutative DNA bomb and pitting the main character against a group of human-animal hybrid professional wrestlers.

Unlike the original film, which was in Cantonese and later dubbed into English, Black Mask 2 was primarily produced in English. The film was later released dubbed into Cantonese in Hong Kong in 2003, with voice direction by Chapman To and featuring Andy Lau as a narrator for the Hong Kong version.

== Plot ==
Kan Fung, who escaped from the organization responsible for his superhuman abilities, seeks a geneticist capable of curing him. He decides to use his powers for the greater good, adopting the moniker Black Mask. Meanwhile, Lang, another high-ranking member of the organization, is hired to find and kill Black Mask.

Wrestling promoter King prepares for a major event featuring his top wrestlers: Claw, Iguana, Chameleon, Snake, and Wolf. When the wrestler Hellraiser (real name Ross) is attacked by Iguana, who transforms into an iguana-human hybrid, Black Mask intervenes. Ross is severely injured. Black Mask pursues Iguana to a nearby tower. When Iguana falls, Black Mask attempts to save him, but Iguana calmly states he is not a monster, releases Black Mask's grip, and falls to his death. A grieving Chameleon, Iguana's girlfriend, witnesses Iguana's remains revert to human form.

It is revealed that the wrestlers were experimented upon by Dr. Moloch, who injected them with animal DNA to enhance their skills. They discover the DNA gives them the ability to transform into animal-hybrids. Seeking revenge for Iguana, they intend to track down and kill Black Mask. Chameleon, whose body can blend with her surroundings, begins moving unclothed to remain fully invisible and stalks Black Mask.

Meanwhile, Black Mask locates Dr. Marco Leung, a geneticist who might cure him, and attempts to communicate with her through anonymous calls. Black Mask befriends Raymond, Ross's young son, who idolizes both his father and Black Mask. During an investigation involving the wrestlers, Black Mask scuffles with the invisible Chameleon and is injected with animal DNA by Moloch. This transforms him into a tiger-hybrid, granting him the strength to fight off Chameleon. Locating Dr. Leung, Black Mask warns her about the injected DNA and requests her assistance. Dr. Leung identifies a chemical component that could potentially cure the tiger DNA. Sneaking out, Black Mask retrieves the necessary chemical during another confrontation with the wrestlers. After taking the cure, Black Mask is fully cured of the injected DNA but experiences a reaction that causes him to act violently before staggering into the city in a stupor.

Cornered by an invisible Chameleon, whose upper body occasionally brightens and fades, Black Mask reveals that Iguana intentionally killed himself and that he had tried to help him. Black Mask tells Chameleon that she is losing control of her body and that it will eventually fade completely, leaving her permanently invisible. Feeling remorse and fearing disappearance, Chameleon becomes semi-visible and withdraws.

During a climactic confrontation the following day, Black Mask discovers his old nemesis Lang has incapacitated Moloch and planted a bomb capable of altering DNA throughout the city. In the ensuing fight inside the gateway of the wrestlers' arena, all of the remaining hybrid wrestlers--Snake, Wolf, Chameleon, and Thorn--are quickly eliminated. Snake and Wolf fight Black Mask; Snake is killed by Black Mask, and Wolf is accidentally killed by Thorn, who misidentifies him in the dark. Lang's subordinate, General Troy, fights Black Mask and then pursues Dr. Leung before being crushed by falling pipes. Chameleon, still unclothed and completely invisible, passionately sacrifices herself to help Black Mask when she ambushes Thorn, snatches the bomb from him, and passes it to Black Mask. After interfering with Thorn again, Chameleon and Thorn are both left hanging from a support beam high in the arena. Remembering Iguana's death, Chameleon's upper body abruptly reappears. Chameleon then fades again as she angrily declares that she will never disappear and pushes Thorn's arm off the beam, causing both of them to fall to their deaths. Chameleon's head and shoulders reappear again and finally stabilize in the color of bronze.

Finally, Lang confronts Black Mask. Initially, Lang gains the upper hand, but Black Mask ultimately defeats him and stops the bomb from exploding. The next day, Dr. Leung receives a call from Kan Fung. She leaves the lab and rides away on Kan's motorcycle, implying she has successfully cured him of his original superhuman abilities.

== Cast ==
- Andy On as Kan Fung / Black Mask
- Teresa Maria Herrera as Dr. Marco Leung
- Tobin Bell as Dr. Moloch
- Tyler Mane as "Thorn"
- Oris Erhuero as "Wolf"
- Scott Adkins as Dr. Lang
- Sean Marquette as Raymond
- Traci Lords as "Chameleon"
- Jon Polito as King
- Silvio Simac as Troy
- Andrew Bryniarski as Daniel "Iguana" Martinez
- Rob Van Dam as "Claw"
- Robert Allen Mukes as "Snake"
- Michael Bailey Smith as "Hellraiser" Ross

Erhuero, Lords, and Polito have all been involved in the Highlander Franchise.

The film was the first on-screen appearance of Andy On, although it was the second film On had shot. The first film he worked on, Looking for Mister Perfect, was released after this film in 2003.

== Release ==
Columbia TriStar Home Entertainment released the film direct-to-DVD in the United States on 24 December 2002. The film was released theatrically in Hong Kong on 9 January 2003.

== Controversy ==
A Romanian TV channel Pro TV was fined for up to 5000 Romanian lei (£850.31) by CNA on 9 July 2009 for wrongly age rated film to be 12 and to wrongly broadcast on 20:35 on 8 June 2009, which the movie was rated 15+ by CNA, same in the Finland and the UK, and 18 in Germany.

== Cantonese voice cast ==
- Andy Lau - Narrator
- Louis Koo - Thorn
- Lau Ching-wan - Wolf
- Jordan Chan - Lang
- Cecilia Cheung - Raymond
- Cherrie Ying - Chameleon
- Chapman To - King
- Michael Tse - Iguana
- Patrick Tam - Claw
- Raymond Wong Ho-yin - Snake
