= Li Chi-Tak =

Hong Kong comic artist

Li Chi Tak 利志達
- Born: June 24, 1965 (age 61) Hong Kong
- Notable works: Black Mask (manhua)

Li Chi-Tak (利志達) (born June 24, 1965) is a Hong Kong comic artist.

== Comics ==
- Black Mask, a superhero comic adapted into two movies Black Mask and Black Mask 2: City of Masks
