= George W. Trendle =

American lawyer and businessman

- Born: George Washington Trendle; July 4, 1884; Norwalk, Ohio, U.S.
- Died: May 10, 1972 (aged 87); Grosse Pointe, Michigan, U.S.
- Occupations: Writer, editor, publisher, producer
- Notable work: The Green Hornet; The Lone Ranger

George Washington Trendle (July 4, 1884 – May 10, 1972) was an American lawyer and businessman, best known as the producer of the Lone Ranger radio and television programs along with The Green Hornet and Sergeant Preston of the Yukon.

== Movie theaters ==
During the 1920s, George W. Trendle was a Detroit lawyer who had established a reputation as a tough negotiator specializing in movie contracts and leases. Trendle became involved in the Detroit-area entertainment business in 1928 when local motion picture theater owner John H. Kunsky offered Trendle 25 percent ownership in exchange for his services.

Kunsky had been an early investor in Nickelodeons beginning in 1905. In 1911, he built the first movie theater in Detroit. It was the second movie theater in the nation. By 1928, he owned twenty movie theaters, including four of the largest first-run theaters in Detroit.

Kunsky was being driven out of the theater business when Adolph Zukor acquired the Detroit area film exchange known as the Cooperative Booking Office and began pressuring local theater owners to sell out to Paramount. Trendle negotiated to sell Kunsky's theatres for $6 million. Zukor transferred the theaters to a Paramount subsidiary named United Detroit Theatres. In 1948, Paramount's monopoly became the focus of an antitrust suit initiated by the Society of Independent Motion Picture Producers (SIMPP).

As part of the deal, Trendle and Kunsky were prohibited from reentering the movie business in Detroit. However, Zukor apparently recognized Trendle's talents and hired him to manage the Paramount theaters in Detroit. Trendle is credited as having built the historic Alger Theater, which opened August 22, 1935, on Detroit's east side. Trendle was fired from the United Detroit Theatres for "negligence" in 1937.

== Radio and television stations ==
Trendle and Kunsky formed the Kunsky-Trendle Broadcasting Company in 1929 after purchasing Detroit radio station WGHP. The radio station's call letters were changed to WXYZ.

Trendle was the president and Kunsky was the vice president of the company. Trendle was active as the station manager. Kunsky is rarely mentioned except as co-owner.

WXYZ was initially affiliated with the Columbia Broadcasting System but became an independent station within a year. Trendle's partner, Kunsky, legally changed his name to King in 1936, and the Kunsky-Trendle Broadcasting Company became the King-Trendle Broadcasting Company. WXYZ improved its technical facilities through the 1930s, expanding its studios, raising its daytime power from 1,000 to 5,000 watts in the late 1930s, and increasing nighttime power to 5,000 watts in time for its mandated 1941 move from 1240 to 1270 kHz under the North American Regional Broadcasting Agreement.

In 1931, Kunsky-Trendle acquired WASH and WOOD in Grand Rapids, Michigan. The two stations merged facilities, including studios and transmitters, but retained both station licenses. WASH was on the air from 8 a.m. to noon, and WOOD from noon to midnight. WOOD-WASH became an NBC Red affiliate in 1935. King and Trendle decided to drop the WASH license in 1942, keeping the WOOD identification.

In 1946, the newly formed American Broadcasting Company purchased the King-Trendle Broadcasting Company and its radio stations for $3.65 million. This sale was for the broadcast facilities (including WOOD, WXYZ, and the Michigan Regional Network) and a construction permit for what would later become WXYZ-TV (channel 7) but did not include ownership of Trendle's radio programs. The FCC approved ABC's purchase on July 18, 1946. In 1952, Paramount Theaters (owners of Kunsky and Trendle's former chain of Detroit area theaters) acquired ABC, including WXYZ.

Trendle entered into a new partnership with long-term business associates H. Allen Campbell and Raymond Meurer. The Trendle-Campbell Broadcasting Company was formed in 1946 and started radio station WTCB in Flint, Michigan. The new radio station went on the air April 26, 1946, with a four-tower 1000-watt broadcast array. The call letters were later changed to WTAC. In 1953, they added UHF television station WTAC-TV affiliated with ABCTV and DuMont. The TV station went out of business less than a year later because too few TVs at the time were equipped to receive UHF channels. The radio station has changed owners several times and its call sign was changed to WSNL in 1997. The station is currently owned by The Christian Broadcasting System. Three of the four towers were demolished in 2003 to make room for redevelopment of the site. The fourth tower was removed in 2004 after new transmitting facilities were completed in Gaines Township, southwest of Flint.

Another Trendle-Campbell radio station (WPON) went on the air in December 1954. The station was located in Pontiac, Michigan, with studios in the Waldron Hotel in downtown Pontiac. Trendle and Campbell were reportedly still in charge of station operations in the late 1960s. In 1987, WPON's transmitter was moved from Pontiac to Walled Lake. The station is currently owned by Southfield-based Birach Broadcasting and has a talk-and-oldies format.

== Penny pinching ==
The Kunsky-Trendle business venture began at the start of the Great Depression, and Trendle took many cost-cutting moves that earned him a reputation as a penny-pincher. According to Dick Osgood in his book Wyxie Wonderland: An Unauthorized 50-Year Diary of WXYZ Detroit, he was assisted in this by H. Allen Campbell.

Campbell was an advertising salesman for the Hearst organization whom Trendle hired to find sponsors for his radio programs. Campbell is credited with signing Silvercup Bread (of the Gordon Baking Company) as the first sponsor for the Lone Ranger series. This was a big account and helped to bring the show to nationwide syndication. Apparently, Campbell's contributions to the business were significant. He continued working for Trendle for the next twenty years and eventually became one of Trendle's business partners.

Campbell reportedly kept a set of books to show employees that the company was losing money and could not afford to pay higher salaries. Trendle and Campbell often responded to employee requests for salary increases by downplaying their value to the company and threatening to fire them. This threat was particularly effective during the Depression.

Trendle specified the music on WXYZ shows should be non-copyrighted classical so that the music was royalty-free. This is the reason that the William Tell Overture was adopted as the Lone Ranger theme and The Flight of the Bumble Bee became the theme for the Green Hornet show.

== New programming ==
In June 1932, Trendle decided to drop the network affiliation to operate WXYZ as an independent station. His station would produce its own radio drama series and broadcast locally produced music programs rather than pay for syndicated programs. Jim Jewell was hired as the station's dramatic director and supplied the actors from his own repertory company, the "Jewell Players." Freelance radio writer Fran Striker was hired to write many of these programs. The earliest dramatic radio series included Thrills of the Secret Service, Dr. Fang, and Warner Lester, Manhunter. Striker wrote many of the scripts and eventually became head of WXYZ's script department.

Late in 1932, Trendle began discussing ideas to create a new radio series with a cowboy as the hero. He wanted a mysterious hero who would have the same type of appeal as Zorro or Robin Hood. The target audience included children, so Trendle insisted on a wholesome hero with high moral standards. Violence and romance were to be minimized. Trendle worked out the basic concept of a masked vigilante, a lone Texas ranger with a big white horse, in staff meetings with Jim Jewell and studio manager Harold True. Then it was turned over to Fran Striker to flesh out the details and provide the scripts. His contributions included silver bullets and an Indian companion. The result was The Lone Ranger, which began broadcasting January 30, 1933, on WXYZ and the seven other stations of the Michigan Regional Network.

The Lone Ranger was an almost immediate hit. In May, a free popgun was offered to the first 300 listeners to send a written request; the station received nearly 25,000 replies. In July, the Lone Ranger made a public appearance at a park and a crowd estimated at 70,000 gathered.

Trendle recognized the value of the Lone Ranger and forced Striker and Jewell to sign over all rights. Along with the legal rights, Trendle claimed credit as the creator of the Lone Ranger. Trendle and his partners kept most of the profits from radio syndication, movie rights, and merchandising while Striker and Jewell were given little more than their salaries.

By the beginning of 1934, the show was syndicated to WGN, Chicago, and WOR, Newark. Other stations soon followed. The live broadcasts were transmitted over telephone lines to the other stations. When the Mutual Broadcasting System was created in 1934, WXYZ became a charter member and the Lone Ranger program was featured on the Mutual Network. Although WXYZ dropped out to join NBC Blue about a year later, contractual obligations kept The Lone Ranger on Mutual until 1942, during this period The Lone Ranger was produced at WXYZ but heard in the Detroit area over Mutual's new affiliate, CKLW. It then switched to the NBC Blue Network, which became ABC in 1943. The popularity of the series rapidly grew and it was eventually heard on 249 radio stations nationwide.

In order to service a nationwide audience, the live broadcast was performed three times, once for each time zone. Beginning in February 1938, the third performance was also recorded on a transcription disk for later broadcast on stations that did not have a live connection to the network.

In 1936, The Green Hornet was added to the roster of WXYZ programs. The Green Hornet was a modern-day masked crime fighter named Britt Reid and was descended from the Lone Ranger's nephew Dan Reid. He was assisted by his Japanese (later changed to Filipino when American involvement in World War II grew more likely) valet Kato, who used martial arts. Fran Striker wrote most of the scripts for the series.

In 1937, Trendle licensed Republic Pictures to produce a movie version of The Lone Ranger. Trendle was not happy with changes that were made in the movie adaptations and hired attorney Raymond Meurer to oversee licensing of the franchise. However, Trendle did like the incidental music Republic used on the serial's soundtrack and acquired the right to use it on The Lone Ranger. In 1939, when The Lone Ranger moved from Mutual to NBC (Blue), new arrangements were recorded by The NBC Symphony and used for the rest of the run of the radio series and on the TV series episodes produced by Trendle's company.

In 1938, Trendle asked his writing staff to create an adventure series featuring a dog as the hero. Writer Tom Dougall created Challenge of the Yukon, a series about Sergeant Preston of the North-West Mounted Police and his sled dog Yukon King.

In 1939, Striker created Ned Jordan Secret Agent for WXYZ.

In 1949, Trendle hired former MGM film producer Jack Chertok to produce The Lone Ranger television series. Trendle was credited as executive producer.

In 1950, Trendle began producing Bob Barclay - American Agent. Bob Barclay was an undercover agent for the U.S. Government with a cover identity as a news correspondent. Trendle received complaints from the U.S. Government because the stories sounded too much like actual cases. The American press also complained that the series was hurting the real-life situation of William Oatis. Oatis was a reporter being held on espionage charges in Czechoslovakia. The series was cancelled at the end of its first season.

In July 1954, Trendle sold the rights to the Lone Ranger to the Wrather Corporation for $3 million. The radio series ceased at that time, but the television series continued until 1957 with Jack Wrather as the new executive producer.

From 1955 to 1958, the radio program Challenge of the Yukon was adapted for television as Sergeant Preston of the Yukon. The series was produced by Trendle-Campbell-Meurer Inc. during its first two seasons but was sold to Jack Wrather Productions in 1957.

== Death ==
On May 10, 1972, Trendle died of a heart attack at the age of 87. He is buried in Detroit's Woodlawn Cemetery.

== See also ==
- Alger Theater

== Sources ==
- Dunning, John (1998). On the Air: The Encyclopedia of Old-Time Radio. New York: Oxford University Press. ISBN 0-19-507678-8
- Osgood, Dick (1981). Wyxie Wonderland: An Unauthorized 50-Year Diary of WXYZ Detroit. Ohio: Bowling Green University Press.
- Bisco, Jim (2005). “Buffalo's Lone Ranger: The Prolific Fran Striker Wrote the Book on Early Radio.“ Western New York Heritage, Vol 7, Number 4, Winter 2005.
- J Brian III. ”HI-YO SILVER“ The Saturday Evening Post. October 14, 1939
