= Al Hodge =

American actor (1912–1979)

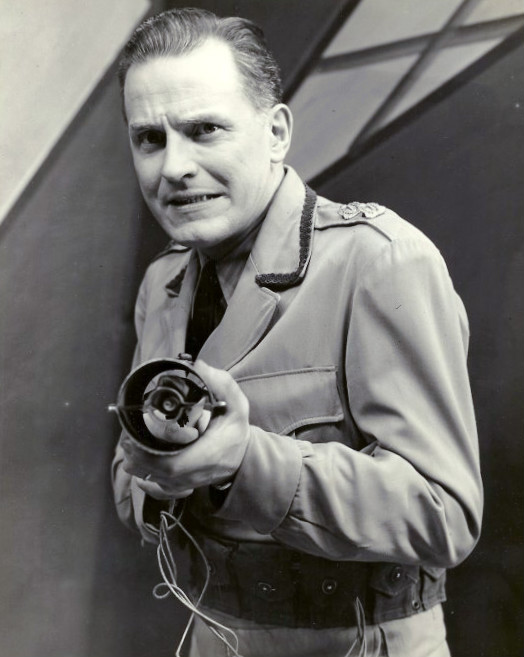
Al Hodge as Captain Video

Albert E. Hodge (April 18, 1912 – March 19, 1979) was an American actor best known for playing space adventurer Captain Video on the DuMont Television Network from December 15, 1950, to April 1, 1955. He played the Green Hornet on radio from January 1936 until January 1943.

== Biography ==
Hodge was born in Ravenna, Ohio. His parents operated a tailoring and dry-cleaning business. Hodge acted and took part in sports at Ravenna High School. Nicknamed "Abie", he was a track star, a drum major and manager of the band, sang bass in the boys glee club and was a cheerleader.

Hodge graduated from Miami University in Oxford, Ohio, in 1934, majoring in drama. After touring as an actor with the Casford Players, he was hired by WXYZ in Detroit, Michigan. Besides originating the role of Britt Reid, the Green Hornet, Hodge wrote and delivered daily editorials, announced at football games, wrote advertising copy, worked as a disc jockey, and produced radio dramas and documentaries, including The Lone Ranger and Challenge of the Yukon. He served in the United States Navy during World War II, and was bedridden for a year with pleurisy.

=== Captain Video ===
After his discharge from the Navy, Hodge worked in New York City in a variety of radio and early TV roles. In 1949 he took over the role of Captain Video from Richard Coogan, who wanted to leave the series to concentrate on Broadway. Hodge played the role on live television Monday through Saturday at 7pm ET, and then Monday through Friday at 7 pm for the last four seasons.

When the DuMont network collapsed in 1955, Hodge continued the role of Captain Video on a children's show, Wonderama, and as the host of Captain Video's Cartoons from 1955 to 1957. Those programs were seen only in the New York City area.

In 1950, RCA Victor released "Captain Video and the Captives of Saturn", a recording made by Hodge.

Hodge felt that working on Captain Video had typecast him, and by the late 1960s and early 1970s he was working in increasingly low-paying jobs, eventually having to work as a security guard. He felt he was too closely identified with the role of Captain Video to gain acting parts. As late as 1978, Hodge told reporters that he was almost always recognized on the street and greeted as "Captain Video".

=== After Captain Video ===
He also MC'd "Super Serial" (later the series was retitled:"Serial Theater") weekday evenings on WNTA TV Ch.13 during the 1959 TV season. Hodge's last regular TV stint was hosting "The Space Explorer's Club" weekday evenings on WOR TV Ch.9 in NYC in 1961. Ironically, he hosted his last TV program as himself (information about Hodge hosting "Super Serial"/"Serial Theater" and "The Space Explorer's Club" can be found in "The NYC Kids Shows Round Up" Section of www.tvparty.com).

Hodge then moved to California, where he guest-starred on Alfred Hitchcock Presents, Mannix, The Mod Squad, Tightrope!, Hawaiian Eye, Coronado 9 and other drama or detective series.

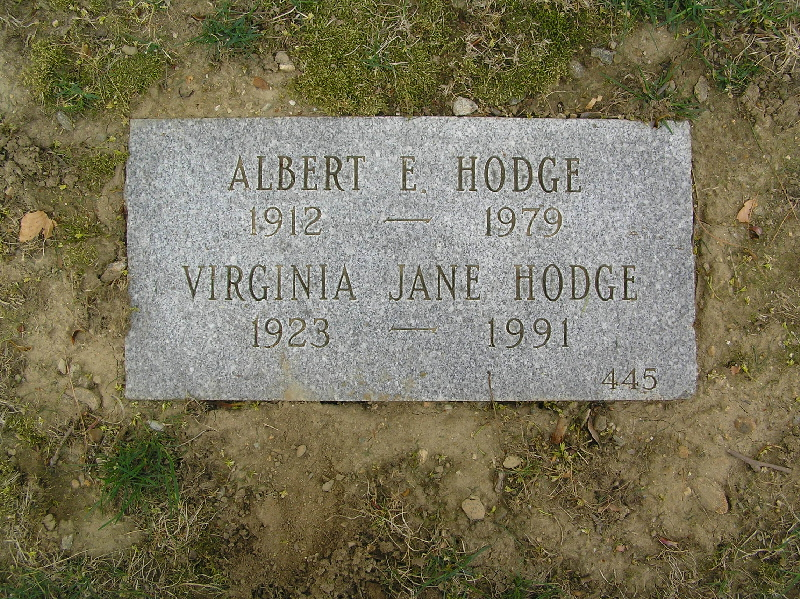
The grave of Al Hodge in Kensico Cemetery

Hodge largely dropped from sight after 1975. He lived for four years in the George Washington Hotel in New York City, his room crammed with collectible items from his career as Captain Video. He is said to have struggled with alcoholism.

His post-television employment included selling real estate and working as a guard at a bank and at Cartier.

== Personal life ==
Little is known of Hodge's private life. He married three times, and it is sometimes erroneously stated he fathered three children. In reality, he fathered a daughter, Diane, during his first marriage to Betty; the boy and girl he was frequently photographed with in the 1950s were John Taft Potter Jr. and Lois Trimble Potter, his step children from his second wife, Doris Ruth Trimble Hodge. Hodge and his third wife, Jane Virginia Hodge, a former showgirl, are buried in the same grave at Kensico Cemetery in Westchester County, New York.

== Death ==
On March 19, 1979, Hodge died of heart failure in the George Washington Hotel in New York City.

== Tributes ==
In the first filmed episode of The Honeymooners ("TV or Not TV?", October 1, 1955), Ed Norton and Ralph Kramden watch a fictionalized "Captain Video" episode on their new mutually owned television set (although "Captain Video" had ended its run six months earlier).

The first story in DC Comics' Weird War Tales #123 (May, 1983), "Captain Spaceman Will Be Waiting!", is dedicated to Al Hodges.

== Selected filmography ==
- Alfred Hitchcock Presents (1960) (Season 5 Episode 30: "Insomnia") as Mr. Turney
