= Fran Striker =

American radio and comic writer (1903–1962)

- Born: August 19, 1903 Buffalo, New York, U.S.
- Died: September 4, 1962 (aged 59) Elma, New York, U.S.
- Areas: Writer, editor, publisher, producer
- Notable works: Lone Ranger; Green Hornet

Francis Hamilton Striker (August 19, 1903 – September 4, 1962) was an American writer for radio and comics, best known for creating the characters the Lone Ranger, the Green Hornet, and Sgt. Preston of the Yukon.

== Early life ==
Born in Buffalo, New York, Striker attended Lafayette High School and the University of Buffalo, where he was a member of the Theta Chi fraternity. He dropped out of college and went to New York City where he worked briefly in an amateur theatrical company. Returning to Buffalo, he joined the staff of radio station WEBR (now WDCZ) as an announcer. In 1929, he moved to WTAM in Cleveland, Ohio, where he served as announcer and continuity writer and wrote his first radio drama script, a biography of Stephen Foster. Lured back to WEBR as station manager, Striker wrote material ranging from skits to half-hour mysteries and Western scripts.

Striker soon drifted to freelancing, creating and writing his own series and selling them to stations across the United States. He began a long association with station owner George W. Trendle and radio station WXYZ in Detroit, which was trying to make a name for itself as a producer of radio drama. There he created and wrote the early series Thrills of the Secret Service, Dr. Fang, and Warner Lester, Manhunter (which introduced Mike Axford, later a supporting character on The Green Hornet).

== The Lone Ranger ==
Late in 1932, Striker began working on The Lone Ranger; his earliest scripts were largely reworked from his earlier series Covered Wagon Days. A letter from Trendle dated Monday, January 30, 1933, clearly gives Striker credit for creating the character. However, by 1934 Trendle pressed Striker into signing over his rights to the Lone Ranger for $10. Up to then, Trendle had been paying Striker $7.50 for each episode. Striker was under great financial pressure, supporting not only his wife and two small children but also a dozen other family members who had lost everything during the Great Depression. In exchange for the rights, Striker accepted a writing contract that would provide for his family and offer job security throughout the Depression. In 1939 alone, The Lone Ranger generated a half-million dollars in profit for Trendle. In 1954, Trendle sold The Lone Ranger rights to the Wrather Corporation for three million dollars, a record sale at the time. Trendle later claimed in interviews that he, not Striker, was the creator of The Lone Ranger. Thus began a long controversy over the creation of the character, extending as far as a 1960 television appearance by Striker on To Tell the Truth, which mentioned his role in the character's creation.

The first trial episodes of The Lone Ranger were broadcast on WEBR in Buffalo before the premiere on WXYZ. These first broadcasts starred Buffalo actor John L. Barrett; shortly thereafter, George Seaton (then known as George Stenius) took on the role. When the show became popular, Trendle convinced Striker to move to WXYZ, where he became head of WXYZ's script department. In Detroit, James Lipton portrayed the Lone Ranger's nephew, Dan Reid, during the early 1940s.

Striker was extremely prolific. As well as writing 156 Lone Ranger scripts a year, he wrote The Green Hornet and a short-lived series, Ned Jordan Secret Agent. He wrote several Lone Ranger novels, two movie serials, and a comic strip. He also contributed scripts to Challenge of the Yukon (later adapted for television as Sergeant Preston of the Yukon). He also wrote The Green Hornet comic books and the 1945 newspaper strip The Sea Hound (based on The Adventures of the Sea Hound radio series to which Striker contributed scripts). He was also the author of the popular boy's adventure novels featuring Tom Quest.

Striker's later work included stints on the television versions of The Lone Ranger and Sergeant Preston of the Yukon, which began while the radio series were still on the air. He provided the stories for many TV episodes by reworking old scripts from the radio series. Other writers adapted the stories for television and were credited as "scriptwriters." Striker's credit was given as "From the radio program edited by Fran Striker."

Striker died in a car accident in 1962 in Elma, while moving with his wife and children. His final work was a historical novel, One More River, published posthumously. He was interred at Arcade Rural Cemetery in Arcade. His papers are in the archives of the University at Buffalo.

The characters Lucas Striker and Amy Striker in the 1981 film The Legend of the Lone Ranger were named in honor of Fran Striker. He was inducted into the Buffalo Broadcasting Hall of Fame in 1998.

== Sources ==
- Bisco, Jim. Buffalo's Lone Ranger: The Prolific Fran Striker Wrote the Book on Early Radio. Western New York Heritage, Vol. 7, No. 4, Winter 2005.
- Dunning, John. On the Air: The Encyclopedia of Old-Time Radio. New York: Oxford University Press, 1998. ISBN 0-19-507678-8
- Grams, Martin, The Green Hornet: A History of Radio, Motion Pictures, Comics and Television, OTR Publishing, 2010.
- Harmon, Jim, The Great Radio Heroes, Doubleday, 1967.
- Osgood, Dick. Wyxie Wonderland: An Unauthorized 50-Year Diary of WXYZ Detroit. Ohio: Bowling Green University Press, 1981.
