= List of The Lone Ranger episodes =

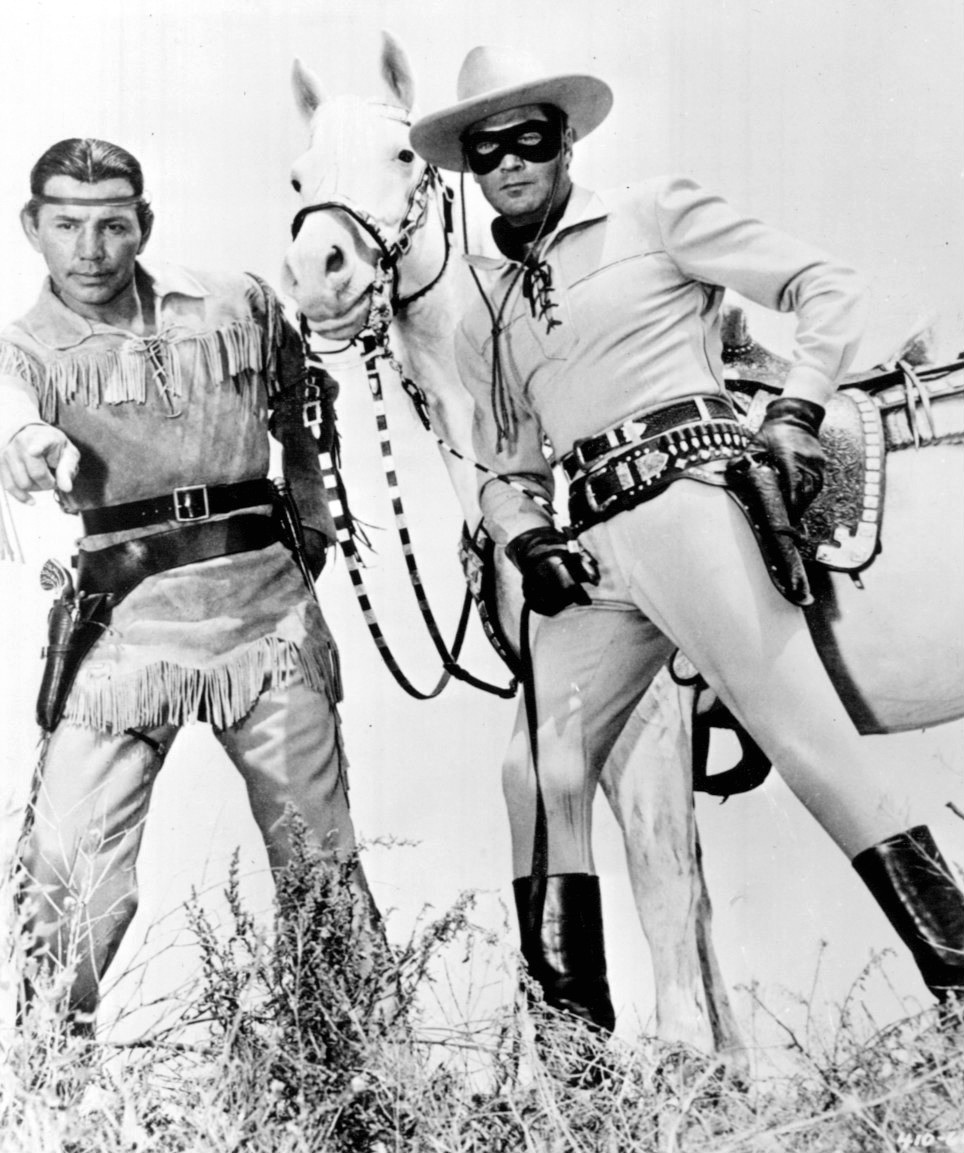
Jay Silverheels, Clayton Moore and Silver from The Lone Ranger.(1960)

The Lone Ranger is an American Western television series that originally aired on the ABC network. The series starred Clayton Moore and Jay Silverheels as the Lone Ranger and Tonto, except for season three when John Hart played the role of the Lone Ranger. The first two seasons aired first-run episodes for 78 consecutive weeks without a rerun. After the second season, the show went on hiatus for a year. In 1951–1952, previously aired episodes were rebroadcast. Production resumed in April 1952 with 52 new half-hour programs produced for the third season. The show returned for a fourth season in September 1954 with 52 new first-run half hour episodes. The first four seasons the program was shot in black and white. After the fourth season, the series went on hiatus again for a year until it went back into production for its fifth and final season in the spring of 1956 with the filming 39 new episodes in color. The series premiered on September 15, 1949, and ended June 6, 1957, with a total of 221 episodes over the course of 5 seasons.

== Series overview ==
Season	Episodes	Originally released	
Season	Episodes	First released	Last released
1	52	September 15, 1949	September 7, 1950
2	26	September 14, 1950	March 8, 1951
3	52	September 11, 1952	September 3, 1953
4	52	September 9, 1954	September 1, 1955
5	39	September 13, 1956	June 6, 1957

== Episodes ==
=== Season 1 (1949–50) ===
No. overall	No. in season	Title	Directed by	Written by	Original release date
1	1	"Enter the Lone Ranger"	George B. Seitz, Jr.	George B. Seitz, Jr.	September 15, 1949
In the old west, six Texas Rangers are led into an ambush by their treacherous guide, Collins (George J. Lewis); Butch Cavendish (Glenn Strange) and his gang of outlaws shoot all the Rangers, and then Collins, and leave them for dead. Hours later, the Indian Tonto comes along and finds that one of the Rangers, a childhood friend of his, is still alive. Tonto nurses him back to health, and the Ranger decides to let everyone believe that he's dead; a sixth grave is made next to the graves of the other five Rangers, and the man puts on a mask. Suddenly, Collins—who had also survived being shot—attacks from the top of a nearby cliff, because he wants Tonto's horse, Scout. (Note: A one-hour special titled The Lone Ranger Rides Again was created from the first three episodes and aired as the 22nd Anniversary special February 12, 1955. The special represented the origin story by editing together the first three episodes of the series into a condensed form. A longer edit of the same three episodes running 75 minutes was released later titled The Legend of the Lone Ranger.); Continued in the next episode.
2	2	"The Lone Ranger Fights On"	George B. Seitz, Jr.	George B. Seitz, Jr.	September 22, 1949
Preparing to hurl a rock at the Ranger, Collins loses his balance and falls to his death. Later, while looking for a horse for the Lone Ranger, he and Tonto find an injured white stallion, whom they rescue from an enraged buffalo. They nurse the horse back to health, and the Ranger slowly gains the animal's trust and names him Silver. Riding on Silver and Scout, the two men travel to Colby to visit the Ranger's friend Jim Blane, who owns a hidden silver mine; however, they find that Cavendish and his men have been killing and replacing key people in the town in order to take it over, and planning to frame Blane for the murders. With the help of Blane and the sheriff (Walter Sande), the Ranger and Tonto capture Cavendish and some of his men, but then the rest of the criminal gang arrives. Continued in the next episode.
3	3	"The Lone Ranger's Triumph"	George B. Seitz, Jr.	George B. Seitz, Jr.	September 29, 1949
The Lone Ranger and Tonto try to get help, but the sheriff's men are in cahoots with Cavendish. Acting alone, the two heroes go back and rescue the sheriff and the town doctor (who had patched up Cavendish's bullet wound) from Cavendish. The Ranger has a plan: with the doctor's help, they quietly round up all the men who had replaced the murdered officials. The next day, Cavendish and the rest of his gang ride to Colby, fully expecting to take over the town, but find the heroes and a posse blocking their way; during the fight, the Ranger chases and catches Cavendish. Now that the entire gang is in jail, the Ranger decides to keep wearing his mask and fighting criminals.
4	4	"Legion of Old Timers"	George B. Seitz, Jr.	Tom Seller	October 6, 1949
Red Devers and his gang have been victimizing ranchers for profit, and their next victim is Bob Kittredge (DeForest Kelley), whose returned from the east to take over his late father's ranch, the Circle K. First Devers frames Bob's foreman, Banty Bishop (Emmett Lynn), for the theft of the ranch's payroll, and gets himself hired as the new foreman; then he has all the other hands fired and replaced with his own henchmen; then he and his gang beat Bob into submission, so they can sell the ranch for their own profit. With the help of Banty and all the other old-timers who were fired from the Circle K, the Lone Ranger and Tonto defeat Devers and his gang and rescue Bob Kittredge.: Note: This is the first episode in which the Lone Ranger uses a disguise other than his mask.
5	5	"Rustlers' Hideout"	George B. Seitz, Jr.	Tom Seller	October 13, 1949
The Vance family settles right in the middle of a war between the Madden gang and local ranches. Despite the hostility to Fred Vance (Harry Lauter) over his past, he decides he will not be run off this parcel of land. The Lone Ranger believes in Fred's innocence, and asks him to help stop the ranchers riding into an ambush and then set a counter trap for the gang after rescuing the son (Dickie Jones) of one of the ranchers being held hostage.
6	6	"War Horse"	George B. Seitz, Jr.	Gibson Fox	October 20, 1949
A promoter wants to purchase the famous war horse 'Black Cloud' owned by the Chief Lame Bear (Chief Yowlachie). Instead of purchasing the horse the people he employs steal the animal instead, taking Lame Bear's son as hostage in the process. After the capture of Tonto, the Lone Ranger needs to use all his diplomacy and cunning as a law enforcer to stop out right war between Lame Bear's tribe and the US cavalry. Featuring Leonard Penn.
7	7	"Pete and Pedro"	George B. Seitz, Jr.	Tom Seller	October 27, 1949
Pete and Pedro don't like working, until the Lone Ranger persuades them to help an attractive young woman save her ranch.
8	8	"The Renegades"	George B. Seitz, Jr.	Edmond A. Kelso and Harry Poppe, Jr.	November 3, 1949
The Indian agent and his henchmen threaten to kill Tonto and his old friend Chief Swift Eagle (Ralph Moody). Featuring Kenneth Williams
9	9	"The Tenderfeet"	George B. Seitz, Jr.	Gibson Fox and Ande Lamb	November 10, 1949
A murder is pinned on two cowboys who strike it rich, until the Lone Ranger traps the real killer.
10	10	"High Heels"	George Archainbaud	Gibson Fox and Ande Lamb	November 17, 1949
The Lone Ranger and Tonto aid a short rancher who is so embarrassed by his lack of height he resorts to specially made platform shoes to add inches to his stature. Featuring Stanley Andrews.
11	11	"Six Gun's Legacy"	George Archainbaud	Edmond A. Kelso and Ande Lamb	November 24, 1949
A tenderfoot stage coach driver is killed then one of his murderers takes his place driving the coach. The Lone Ranger and Tonto come across the scene and realize the boy is still alive and arrange for medical care while covering up the boy is still alive. The Lone Ranger then goes on a quest to find out who the boy is and what was so important that someone would want him dead.
12	12	"Return of the Convict"	George Archainbaud	Gibson Fox and Doris Schroeder	December 1, 1949
The Lone Ranger becomes concerned when he hears a recently released prisoner, John Ames (John Kellogg), is returning to his home town threatening to take revenge on those who wrongly accused him of robbing a stage. At the town news breaks that Ames' intended victims are dead. The Lone Ranger becomes embroiled in the mystery when he's accused of aiding Ames in the murders.
13	13	"Finders Keepers"	George Archainbaud	Ande Lamb	December 8, 1949
Nat Parker (Arthur Franz) has just gotten out of prison after serving 4 years for bank robbery, and is determined to kill his two outlaw partners whom he took the rap for, and recover the $75,000 in stolen money for himself. His loving girlfriend Beata (Carol Thurston), and Father Paul, ask the Lone Ranger to help before Nat makes a grave mistake and ends up back in prison. Featuring Pedro de Cordoba and Francis McDonald
14	14	"The Masked Rider"	George B. Seitz, Jr.	Tom Seller	December 15, 1949
The Lone Ranger pretends to be a notorious outlaw known as "The Mask Rider" so he can join a gang that is holding the sheriff's fiancée (Nan Leslie) hostage and save her. Featuring John Doucette.
15	15	"Old Joe's Sister"	George B. Seitz, Jr.	Tom Seller	December 22, 1949
Joe Peter's sister (Anne O'Neal) visits her brother for the first time in 30 years. Only now he's being impersonated by escaped jailbird Biff Baker (Lester Sharpe).
16	16	"Cannonball McKay"	George B. Seitz, Jr.	Tom Seller	December 29, 1949
The Ranger investigates why a series of Wells Fargo robberies throughout the territory seem to have spared Boone County. Featuring Louise Lorimer and Leonard Strong.
17	17	"The Man Who Came Back"	George Archainbaud	Doris Schroeder	January 5, 1950
The Lone Ranger & Tonto visit old friend Joe Crawford at the Bar C Ranch. Instead they find two men who say Joe's sold his ranch, but won't answer any more questions. The Lone Ranger examines the bill of sale but the dates don't add up. The Ranger and Tonto suspect foul play and begin a search for answers. Featuring Martha Hyer.
18	18	"Outlaw Town"	George Archainbaud	Polly James	January 12, 1950
Jim Andrews (Gene Reynolds) holds up the Wells Fargo office and steals a specific amount of money (5,000.00). He needs the money to enter "Outlaw Town" a safe haven for outlaws who can pay the equivalent of the price on their head. The Lone Ranger decides to infiltrate the town and find out who is behind the operation. Along the way the Lone Ranger discovers Jim Andrews's real motives for his actions. Featuring Greta Granstedt.
19	19	"Greed for Gold"	George B. Seitz, Jr.	Story by : Betty Joyce; Teleplay by : Tom Seller	January 19, 1950
The Lone Ranger stumbles on the murder the sheriff Gilbert (Kermit Maynard) at the Lady Luck gold mine. Investigating the Lone Ranger finds the owner of the mine has also been killed. The Lone Ranger discovers an important clue, and uses the mine foreman, Dusty Duncan (Tudor Owen) as bait to draw out the killers.
20	20	"Man of the House"	George B. Seitz, Jr.	Story by : Dan Beattie; Teleplay by : Tom Seller	January 26, 1950
While on the trail of cattle rustlers, the Lone Ranger and Tonto encounter hen pecked and stay at home husband Casper Dingle (Stanley Farrar). The Lone Ranger convinces Casper to come with him because the latest rustling activity involved Dingle's cattle. Along the way the Ranger gives Casper a few tips and pointers, the result of which far surpass anything ever expected of Casper.
21	21	"Barnaby Boggs, Esquire"	George B. Seitz, Jr.	Story by : George W. Trendle, Gibson Fox; Teleplay by :	February 2, 1950
The Lone Ranger use a traveling salesman Barnaby Boggs (Hal Price) to first identify and if possible trap cattle rustler Red Kruger (Bill Kennedy). Kruger recognizes the threat Boogs presents and does everything in his power to stop Boggs from seeing him. Although basically a coward Boggs goes ahead with the scheme on the promise of the reward money made by the Lone Ranger.
22	22	"Sheep Thieves"	George Archainbaud	Story by : Teleplay by : Louise Rousseau and Herb Meadow	February 9, 1950
Two young men switch clothes while on a stage coach so as to play a practical joke on the owner of one of the local sheep stations. Unbeknown to both of them they set in action a chain of events that could have dire consequences for everyone.: Note: Featuring the first appearance of Chuck Courtney as Dan Reid, the nephew of the Lone Ranger.
23	23	"Jim Tyler's Past"	George Archainbaud	Story by : Fran Striker; Teleplay by : Tom Seller	February 16, 1950
The Lone Ranger and Tonto are constantly frustrated at Blackie Kane (House Peters Jr.)'s ability to evade them. They suspect he is getting help but are not sure who might be responsible. They realize Jim Tyler (Rand Brooks) might be the man they are looking for, however as they delve deeper into the case they discover things that surprises everyone involved.
24	24	"The Man with Two Faces"	George Archainbaud	Story by : Felix Holt; Teleplay by : Tom Seller	February 23, 1950
A strange bearded one eyed thief has been involved in a number of bank robberies. The Lone Ranger thinks he has discovered the man's pattern and waits near what he thinks will be the next town robbed. The Lone Ranger's hunch is partially correct, but the truth when it comes out is far from what anyone expects. Featuring Stanley Andrews.
25	25	"Buried Treasure"	George Archainbaud	Story by : Felix Holt; Teleplay by : Tom Seller	March 2, 1950
Flint Foster (William Challee) breaks from jail and heads for his brothers homestead. A cat mouse game develops when it is realized a large sum of money is hidden somewhere in the house and Flint can't find it.
26	26	"Troubled Waters"	George Archainbaud	Story by : Doris Schroeder; Teleplay by : Herb Meadow	March 9, 1950
The Lone Ranger and Tonto arrive at a ranch looking for water and discover the owner is being attacked by unknown people, they have run his cattle off and poisoned his water supplies. The Lone Ranger goes on a quest to find who is behind the trouble and help the rancher get back on his feet. Featuring Harry Lauter and Eula Morgan.
27	27	"Gold Train"	George B. Seitz, Jr.	David Bramson and George B. Seitz, Jr.	March 16, 1950
After a shoot out during a stage coach robbery the Lone Ranger finds himself being blamed for the deaths. He begins a desperate attempt to avoid capture while trying to capture those responsible for the robbery. Featuring DeForest Kelley and Billy Bletcher.
28	28	"Pay Dirt"	George B. Seitz, Jr.	Story by : Sherman Lowe; Teleplay by : Herb Meadow	March 23, 1950
Two gamblers way-lay a miner who has just struck gold in a mine he is working, wounding him badly. Tonto and the Lone Ranger hear gunfire and go to investigate. The Ranger realizes he needs to get to town to register the claim for the miners as well as identify the attempted claim jumpers/murderers. Featuring Walter Sande and Martin Milner.
29	29	"Billie the Great"	George B. Seitz, Jr.	Tom Seller	March 30, 1950
A group of bank robbers arrives in Clarkesville and tangles with local barber 'Billie' (Minerva Urecal), a gunslinging, fast-drawing, tough-talking woman. When they discover she has a large sum of money, they decide to steal it. Featuring James Flavin.
30	30	"Never Say Die"	George Archainbaud	Tom Seller	April 6, 1950
Butch Cavendish breaks out of prison abducting the wardens son in the process. The Lone Ranger begins the task of trying to track Cavendish down in the knowledge that if he fails, the warden's son will be killed. Featuring Ray Teal and Marjorie Eaton.
31	31	"Gold Fever"	George Archainbaud	Story by : Felix Holt; Teleplay by : David P. Sheppard	April 13, 1950
Ox Martin (John Doucette) and his gang attract the attention of the Lone Ranger, when Martin's gang intercept a mail coach carrying a claim for a gold mine owned by Sam Dingle (Francis Ford). Featuring Elaine Riley and Leonard Strong.
32	32	"Death Trap"	George Archainbaud	Tom Seller	April 20, 1950
The Lone Ranger comes across an abandoned stagecoach that was carrying the outlaw Knife Norton (Jeff York). Tonto follows some tracks to a cabin owned by Uncle Taffy (Lucien Littlefield), but finds no evidence of the outlaw. Featuring James Griffith.
33	33	"Matter of Courage"	George B. Seitz, Jr.	Story by : Felix Holt; Teleplay by : Herb Meadow	April 27, 1950
The Lone Ranger is hot on the heels of two outlaws Dimple Henshaw and Toby Farrell (Don Haggerty, Dick Curtis) who are trying to cross the border into Mexico. Featuring James Arness.
34	34	"Rifles and Renegades"	George B. Seitz, Jr.	George B. Seitz, Jr. and Polly James	May 4, 1950
The Lone Ranger comes across a skirmish between an army patrol and a renegade group of Indians. The Lone Ranger helps fight the Indians off but is concerned they were using weapons that only could have come from the nearby Army fort. He decides he needs to know how they got the weapons.: Note: Featuring John Hart, who would go on to replace series star Clayton Moore as the Lone Ranger in the show's 3rd season.
35	35	"Bullets for Ballots"	George B. Seitz, Jr.	Tom Seller	May 11, 1950
The Lone Ranger and Tonto arrive at a town in the midst of an election. They become concerned when threatened by two men about making sure they vote the correct way. The Lone Ranger decides to check out the two candidates and make sure the democratic process is followed for the good of the people. Featuring Marjorie Lord.
36	36	"The Black Hat"	George B. Seitz, Jr.	Herb Meadow	May 18, 1950
The Lone Ranger and Tonto are concerned that they can't find any sign of a gang of outlaws who recently stole a large amount of gold. Tonto is contacted by an Indian friend who might have information about the robbery, but others want to stop that meeting ever occurring. Featuring Jeff York.
37	37	"Devil's Pass"	George B. Seitz, Jr.	Tom Seller	May 25, 1950
The Lone Ranger and Tonto are heading for the town of Horseshoe when they come across two men shot dead. They realize a large sum of money has been stolen, but can't understand the relationship between the two victims. Featuring Jim Bannon and Gene Evans.
38	38	"Spanish Gold"	George B. Seitz, Jr.	Story by : Ralph Goll; Teleplay by : Herb Meadow and Milton M. Raison	June 1, 1950
The Lone Ranger encounters a paroled prisoner on the trail. As he hears the man's story he becomes concerned an innocent man may have been found guilty of a crime he'd never committed. The Lone Ranger decides to find out if an injustice has occurred. Featuring Gail Davis and Kenneth Tobey.
39	39	"Damsels in Distress"	John H. Morse	Tom Seller	June 8, 1950
The Lone Ranger is on the trail of a foreign secret agent, Baron Von Baden (John Banner), when he discovers a gun designer knifed and on the verge of death. The Lone Ranger realizes the threat Von Baden represents and rushes to foil his plan. Featuring Tom Tyler.
40	40	"Man Without a Gun"	John H. Morse	Joe Richardson	June 15, 1950
The Lone Ranger and Tonto come across a stage coach that seems to have been attacked by Indians. Discovering a survivor the Lone Ranger becomes concerned about irregularities in the attack and becomes convinced someone is trying to spark an Indian war. Featuring Dickie Jones, Ralph Moody and House Peters Jr.
41	41	"Pardon for Curley"	John H. Morse	Herb Meadow	June 22, 1950
The Lone Ranger captures Curley Bates (Douglas Kennedy) only to discover the man has been pardoned and no longer a wanted criminal. Suspicion is raised though when Curley tells the Lone Ranger he has accepted the position of sheriff in a cattle town. The Lone Ranger decides to find out what the real plan is.
42	42	"Eye for an Eye"	George B. Seitz, Jr.	Tom Seller	June 29, 1950
Clay Durfee gets word his appeal has been turned down, and he will be hanged Monday. Elsewhere the remains of his gang, including his brother (I. Stanford Jolley) work on a prison break, by using members of the Governor's family as hostages. When the gang attack a coach, The Ranger and Tonto intercept the group and rescue the women related to the Governor. The Lone Range organizes disguises for his party and they continue their journey to the state capital disguised as Mexicans. The gang doesn't fall for the ruse and attacks disguised group.
43	43	"Outlaw of the Plains"	George B. Seitz, Jr.	David Lang	July 6, 1950
The Ranger and Tonto ride through drought stricken country and encounter two recently robbed men, Clem and Sam, who has been shot. The men tell a story of being robbed of their herd. The Ranger and Tonto set out to intercept the cattle rustlers. Because of the dry conditions they can't follow tracks, and Tonto is sent to the local town for extra help. At Sam's shack the Ranger explains the situation to the other cattleman. Featuring Jay Morley.
44	44	"White Man's Magic"	John H. Morse	Joseph Polland	July 13, 1950
Tonto finds the body of an Indian belonging to a local tribe. The Ranger and Tonto decide foul play is involved and follow a set tracks leading back to the reservation. Independently we discover the local Indian police Sergeant Pala (Lane Bradford) working with the owner of the Empire Land Company to convince the Indians to rebel and lose their land. Tonto and the Ranger discover a weapons cache left by Pala, and disable the weapons. The Chief of the tribe White Eagle (Ralph Moody) is poisoned causing the expected uprising. Featuring Jane Frazee.
45	45	"Trouble for Tonto"	John H. Morse	Tom Seller	July 20, 1950
To get evidence on the Buck Fargo (Gene Roth) gang's plan to rob the Baxter bank Tonto pretends, after Terry Baxter (Robert Arthur) has killed Black Eagle, to be Black Eagle who has helped kidnap Terry Baxter but Tonto is revealed by a ring from Black Eagle's squaw. Featuring Lyle Talbot and Byron Foulger.
46	46	"Sheriff of Gunstock"	John H. Morse	Joe Richardson	July 27, 1950
A group of outlaws attack and destroy a barber shop in Gunstock. The Lone Ranger hears of the trouble and heads for the town to see if he can help Sheriff Bennett (Walter Sande). At the town we discover Rocky Hanford (John Doucette) is behind a protection racket and is extorting the businesses in the town. The Ranger arrives to discover the Sheriff claiming there are no problems. The Ranger is concerned about the sheriff, and goes undercover in the town. He discovers the town believes the sheriff was bought off by Hanford. The Lone Ranger confronts the sheriff about the allegations. Featuring Mira McKinney and John Hart.
47	47	"The Wrong Man"	George B. Seitz, Jr.	Eve Greene	August 3, 1950
Sheriff Barnes (Don Beddoe) arrives at a cabin looking for John Meredith (Richard Crane) who he arrests for the murder of Judge Scoville. The Lone Ranger hears Meredith may be lynched. Later the Ranger with Tonto, head for town to keep an eye on the jail and interview Meredith. The Ranger speaks to the sheriff who brushes off his concerns. As night falls the town's folk begin organizing the lynching. Again the Ranger steps in and talks them out of it. Meanwhile Ted Latham (Glen Vernon) confronts his father, without the lynching, there's a chance Ted's involvement will be revealed. Featuring Nan Leslie and Almira Sessions.
48	48	"The Beeler Gang"	George B. Seitz, Jr.	Eve Greene	August 10, 1950
The Lone Ranger and Tonto are breaking camp when they see a man leave a package by a rock. Investigating they find a ransom note for the son of the local sheriff Bert Lawson (Robert Rockwell). The Ranger arrives at the sheriff's home to offer what help he could. Tonto and the Lone Ranger stake out the town to watch for any strangers who might ride into town. At the outlaws hideout the child falls ill and needs medical attention. Tonto sees a stranger purchase candy and other items, he alerts the Lone Ranger, who poses as a doctor to get the strangers attention. Featuring Beverly Garland.
49	49	"The Star Witness"	George B. Seitz, Jr.	Curtis Kenyon	August 17, 1950
No one believes twelve-year-old Johnnie Williams (Michael Chapin), the only witness to a cold-blooded murder, until the Lone Ranger validates his story by exposing the killers. Featuring Gene Evans.
50	50	"The Black Widow"	George B. Seitz, Jr.	Joe Richardson	August 24, 1950
The Lone Ranger gets word Silky Carter (John Alvin) has been released from Jail. The Ranger suspects he will head for Thunder Mountain to retrieve money from previous robberies. At the Mountain a stage coach is attacked and one of the passengers is dragged off. At the outlaw hide out it is discovered the man snatched is not the right person. They kill and bury him. The Ranger encounters Doc Hagen, a supposed spider expert who quickly reveals his lack of knowledge about spiders. The Ranger thinks he is looking for Silky Carter's stash. Featuring Lane Chandler.
51	51	"The Whimsical Bandit"	John H. Morse	David Lang	August 31, 1950
The Lone Ranger's nephew Dan (Chuck Courtney) comes across a dead man. The Lone Ranger quickly identifies him as 'Click' Phillips, the fastest Morse code operator in the area and known member of Juan Branco (Nestor Paiva)'s gang. They believe 'Click' was sending a message when he fell and died. The Ranger believes the gang is going to attack an expected stage coach full of gold. Branco is successful and steals the gold; he becomes enamored with the female passenger Maude (Sheila Ryan) and gives her a distinctive ring. The Ranger intercepts the escaping coach.
52	52	"Double Jeopardy"	John H. Morse	Curtis Kenyon	September 7, 1950
Clyde Hinshaw (Ric Roman) who is in jail for murder seems peculiarly nonchalant about his upcoming trial. When the Lone Ranger sees Ma Hinshaw (Marin Sais) and her son talking to Judge Brady who has seen the murder, he talks to the judge and learns that the Hinshaws hold the judge's daughter Molly (Christine Larson) under threat of murder if the judge does not present his testimony so that Clyde is acquitted. In the meantime, Ma Hinshaw and Rufe (Riley Hill) split up so Tonto can not follow the trail. However the Lone Ranger devises a plan to make Clyde believe that the hideout has been found.

=== Season 2 (1950–51) ===
No. overall	No. in season	Title	Directed by	Written by	Original release date
53	1	"Million Dollar Wallpaper"	John H. Morse	George W. Trendle, Harry Poppe, Jr., Ralph Goll,	September 14, 1950
The Lone Ranger and Tonto come across salting of the Red Gap mine, a scheme to lure investment suckers. Featuring Paul Fix.
54	2	"Mission Bells"	George B. Seitz, Jr.	George W. Trendle, Eve Greene, Ralph Goll	September 21, 1950
The Lone Ranger and Tonto investigate the murder of former outlaw Stephen Dunn. Featuring Walter Sande and James Griffith.
55	3	"Dead Man's Chest"	George B. Seitz Jr.	George W. Trendle, Joseph F. Poland, Ralph Goll	September 28, 1950
A small-town crime wave is engineered by gang members. Featuring Myron Healey and Harry Lauter.
56	4	"Outlaw's Revenge"	George B. Seitz Jr.	George W. Trendle, Francis P. Scannell, Dan Beattie, Fran Striker	October 5, 1950
The Lone Ranger is framed by a bank robber dressing as him to commit the crime. Featuring Kenneth MacDonald.
57	5	"Danger Ahead"	John H. Morse	George W. Trendle, Joe Richardson, Fran Striker	October 12, 1950
A deputy sheriff hires a hit man to kill sheriff, so he can move into the top position. Featuring Don Haggerty.
58	6	"Crime in Time"	John H. Morse	George W. Trendle, Herb Meadow, Fran Striker	October 19, 1950
A watchmaker comes under scrutiny. Featuring Lane Bradford.
59	7	"Drink of Water"	John H. Morse	George W. Trendle, Joseph F. Poland, Fran Striker	October 26, 1950
A rain maker promises a miracle in Greenville. Featuring Bill Kennedy and Stanley Andrews.
60	8	"Thieves' Money"	George B. Seitz, Jr.	George W. Trendle, Curtis Kenyon, Fran Striker	November 2, 1950
A counterfeiter (John Doucette) kills a federal agent Jim Collins, then takes his place.
61	9	"The Squire"	George B. Seitz Jr.	George W. Trendle, David Lang, Fran Striker	November 9, 1950
Bank robbers try to run down witnesses, while Tonto and the Lone Ranger try to capture the robbers. Featuring Margaret Kerry.
62	10	"Masked Deputy"	George B. Seitz Jr.	George W. Trendle, Harry Poppe Jr., Fran Striker	November 16, 1950
Cattle are being stolen in large numbers, but it's a mystery what happens to the cattle. Featuring Scott Randall.
63	11	"Banker's Choice"	John H. Morse	George W. Trendle, Joe Richardson, Fran Striker	November 23, 1950
Blackmail and hidden family secrets about who's who in the real crime. Featuring David Bruce.
64	12	"Desert Adventure"	John H. Morse	George W. Trendle, David Lang, Felix Holt, Fran Striker	November 30, 1950
The Lone Ranger pursues the Yuma Kid (House Peters Jr.) and his gang.
65	13	"Bad Medicine"	John H. Morse	George W. Trendle, Curtis Kenyon, Fran Striker	December 7, 1950
With the Lone Ranger in hot pursuit, the Bolton Gang (Dick Curtis & Hal Baylor) take a doctor (Harry Harvey Sr.) hostage.
66	14	"One Jump Ahead"	John H. Morse	George W. Trendle, Eve Greene, Fran Striker	December 14, 1950
Outlaw Rick Saunders (Robert Rockwell) is never without funds. Tonto and the Lone Ranger investigate his sourcing.
67	15	"Lady Killer"	George B. Seitz Jr.	George W. Trendle, Joe Richardson, Dan Beattie, Fran Striker	December 21, 1950
The Lone Ranger is on the trail of whoever is attacking gold shipments. Featuring Nan Leslie and I. Stanford Jolley.
68	16	"Paid in Full"	George B. Seitz Jr.	George W. Trendle, Harry Poppe Jr., Dan Beattie, Fran Striker	December 28, 1950
A mortgage holder tries to boot a couple off their property, when he realizes there are valuable mineral deposits on the property. Featuring Larry J. Blake.
69	17	"Letter of the Law "	John H. Morse	George W. Trendle, Curtis Kenyon, Ralph Goll, Fran Striker	January 4, 1951
Jeff Niles (Warren Douglas), who committed a crime in his youth, married the sheriff's daughter Molly (Noel Neill) and is living under an alias. He is blackmailed by someone who knows his real identity.
70	18	"The Silent Voice"	John H. Morse	George W. Trendle, Tom Seller, Fran Striker	January 11, 1951
The Lone Ranger saves Cleve Ritchie from henchmen of Dr. Payton who has planted Stella Watson in his home to care for his grandmother (Mira McKinney) post stroke so Stella can get a map to an old Spanish treasure that Cleve has found to fund the town.
71	19	"The Outcast"	John H. Morse	George W. Trendle, Marjorie E. Fortin, Dan Beattie, Fran Striker	January 18, 1951
The Lone Ranger and Tonto are searching for a group of outlaws who are responsible for a series of hold ups. Even with the local sheriff and Texas Rangers involved, no one has been able to catch them. Featuring Robert Rockwell.
72	20	"Mr. Trouble"	George B. Seitz, Jr.	George W. Trendle, Herb Meadow, Tom Dougall, Fran Striker	January 25, 1951
The Lone Ranger and Tonto come across railway builders who've been attacked. What appears on the surface to be an Indian raid quickly appears to be far more complex and dangerous. Featuring Robert Rockwell, Larry J. Blake and House Peters Jr.
73	21	"Behind the Law"	George B. Seitz, Jr.	George W. Trendle, Joe Richardson, Fran Striker	February 1, 1951
The Lone Ranger gets word that the Folsom gang has overrun the town of San Carlos, and the local sheriff refuses to act. The Lone Ranger goes to the town to find out the true situation. Featuring Gene Roth and Gene Evans.
74	22	"Trouble at Black Rock"	George B. Seitz, Jr.	George W. Trendle, Herb Meadow, Fran Striker	February 8, 1951
Ruthless McCarty and two fellow prisoners have escaped and are heading for Black Rock mine in which McCarty has hidden stolen gold coin but where old-timer Neeley is working a claim and has been injured in an accident that uncovered the loot. Featuring Michael Ansara.
75	23	"Two Gold Lockets"	John H. Morse	George W. Trendle, Tom Seller, Dan Beattie, Fran Striker	February 15, 1951
A young man is released from prison fully intent on joining the "Carlos Marina" gang. The Lone Ranger encounters a man who had previously fought against the gang. They decide to join forces to combat this new threat to peace in the West. Featuring Darryl Hickman and Dwayne Hickman.
76	24	"The Hooded Men"	John H. Morse	George W. Trendle, Joe Richardson, Dan Beattie	February 22, 1951
Tonto gets caught up in a robbery conducted by the Hooded gang, who the Lone Ranger has been tracking for some time.The Ranger has a suspicion who is behind the gang, but he needs time to connect all the dots. Featuring Walter Sande, John Doucette, Mira McKinney and Denver Pyle.
77	25	"Friend in Need"	John H. Morse	George W. Trendle, Harry Poppe Jr., Ralph Goll, Fran Striker	March 1, 1951
The Lone Ranger gets a message from the local padre. He asks The Lone Ranger and Tonto to try to find evidence Jeff Austin (John McGuire), currently on death row, was not responsible for a gold robbery.
78	26	"Backtrail"	George B. Seitz, Jr.	George W. Trendle, Harry Poppe Jr., Dan Beattie, Fran Striker	March 8, 1951
A crooked stagecoach express agent directs two henchmen who dress as Paiute braves to rob stage shipments with valuable cargo. Featuring Herbert Lytton and Robert Bice.

=== Season 3 (1952–53) ===
(John Hart takes over the role of the Lone Ranger.)

No. overall	No. in season	Title	Directed by	Written by	Original release date
79	1	"Outlaw's Son"	Paul Landres	George W. Trendle, Tom Dougall, Tom Seller	September 11, 1952
An outlaw wants to give up his criminal ways and return home to his young son.
80	2	"Outlaw Underground"	Paul Landres	George W. Trendle, Joe Richardson, Ralph Goll	September 18, 1952
A newspaper reporter goes undercover to expose a criminal network.
81	3	"Special Edition"	John H. Morse	George W. Trendle, Harry Poppe Jr., Fran Striker	September 25, 1952
Swindlers plan to abscond with a town's fund.
82	4	"Desperado at Large"	John H. Morse	George W. Trendle, Charles Larson, Fran Striker	October 2, 1952
The Lone Ranger and Slim Roberts hatch a plan to catch The Kansas Kid.
83	5	"Through the Wall"	John H. Morse	George W. Trendle, Ralph Goll, Tom Seller	October 9, 1952
The Lone Ranger and Tonto try to rid Granite City of a terrorist outlaw gang.
84	6	"Jeb's Gold Mine"	John H. Morse	Tom Dougall, Joe Richardson	October 16, 1952
Jeb Macauley is the target of criminals who want to run him out of town so they can steal his gold mine.
85	7	"Frame for Two"	John H. Morse	Joe Richardson	October 23, 1952
Two feuding ranchers threaten to disrupt a town.
86	8	"Ranger in Danger"	John H. Morse	George W. Trendle, Tom Seller	October 30, 1952
Someone has sworn vengeance on the Lone Ranger.
87	9	"Delayed Action"	John H. Morse	George W. Trendle, Curtis Kenyon	November 6, 1952
The Lone Ranger and Tonto are framed for a bank robbery.
88	10	"The Map"	Paul Landres	George W. Trendle, Tom Seller	November 13, 1952
Outlaws steal a map belonging to the railroad company.
89	11	"Trial by Fire"	John H. Morse	George W. Trendle, Charles Larson, Fran Striker	November 20, 1952
The Lone Ranger goes under disguise as a doctor.
90	12	"Word of Honor"	John H. Morse	George W. Trendle, Curtis Kenyon, Ralph Goll	November 27, 1952
The Lone Ranger and Tonto try to clear an innocent man framed for murder.
91	13	"Treason at Dry Creek"	John H. Morse	George W. Trendle, David P. Sheppard	December 4, 1952
A Pony Express employee steals confidential government dispatches.
92	14	"The Condemned Man"	Paul Landres	George W. Trendle, Curtis Kenyon, Ralph Goll	December 11, 1952
The Lone Ranger and Tonto search for the killer of the son of Chief Lone Eagle.
93	15	"The New Neighbor"	Paul Landres	George W. Trendle, Harry Poppe Jr., Dan Beattie	December 18, 1952
A range war looms over water rights.
94	16	"Best Laid Plans"	John H. Morse	George W. Trendle, Tom Dougall, Charles Larson	December 25, 1952
The Lone Ranger seaarches for answers when the local sheriff won't take action to prevent a town war.
95	17	"Indian Charlie"	John H. Morse	George W. Trendle, Joe Richardson, Fran Striker	January 1, 1953
Young man Indian Charlie has run afoul of the law.
96	18	"The Empty Strongbox"	John H. Morse	George W. Trendle, Charles Larson, Betty Joyce	January 8, 1953
The Lone Ranger gets blamed for an attempted stage coach robbery and the death of the driver.
97	19	"Trader Boggs"	Paul Landres	George W. Trendle, Joe Richardson, Fran Striker	January 15, 1953
Barnaby Boggs wants to open a store in Larabee, but a local merchant feels threatened by the competition and wants to stop him.
98	20	"Bandits in Uniform"	Paul Landres	George W. Trendle, David P. Sheppard, Tom Dougall	January 22, 1953
A renegade Army officer and his confederates are robbing Mexican settlers.
99	21	"The Godless Men"	Paul Landres	George W. Trendle, Tom Seller	January 29, 1953
A preacher is robbed by local men.
100	22	"The Devil's Bog"	John H. Morse	George W. Trendle, Curtis Kenyon, Fran Striker	February 5, 1953
Tonto becomes ill, and the Lone Ranger searches for the cause.
101	23	"Right to Vote"	Paul Landres	George W. Trendle, William Bruckner	February 12, 1953
Election shenanigan after corrupt town politicians steal the election results that would have put them out of office.
102	24	"The Sheriff's Son"	Paul Landres	George W. Trendle, Charles Larson, Betty Joyce	February 19, 1953
A sheriff's son is released from the prison he committed him to.The son seeks revenge.
103	25	"Tumblerock Law"	Paul Landres	George W. Trendle, David P. Sheppard, Fran Striker	February 26, 1953
A murder has been committed in Tumlerock, and the lone witness is kidnapped.
104	26	"Sinner by Proxy"	John H. Morse	George W. Trendle, John Thiele, Fran Striker	March 5, 1953
A jailed criminal names the Lone Ranger as his partner.
105	27	"Stage for Mademoiselle"	John H. Morse	George W. Trendle, Joe Richardson	March 12, 1953
Everywhere Marianne Mornay (Noreen Nash) performs, the crime rate rises.
106	28	"Son by Adoption"	Paul Landres	George W. Trendle, David P. Sheppard, Dan Beattie	March 19, 1953
The son of an outlaw always believed he was an orphan.Now his father comes looking for him.
107	29	"Mrs. Banker"	Paul Landres	George W. Trendle, Joe Richardson	March 26, 1953
The Lone Ranger goes under disguise to catch robbers.
108	30	"Trouble in Town"	Paul Landres	George W. Trendle, Curtis Kenyon	April 2, 1953
A local merchant incites a bank run.
109	31	"Black Gold"	John H. Morse	George W. Trendle, William Bruckner	April 9, 1953
Schemers plan to buy land cheap before everyone else realizes there's valuable oil under the land.
110	32	"The Durango Kid"	John H. Morse	George W. Trendle, Curtis Kenyon	April 16, 1953
The Durango Kid seeks revenge on those who put him in jail.
111	33	"The Deserter"	John H. Morse	George W. Trendle, Charles Larson, Fran Striker	April 23, 1953
An Army private seems to have deserted in battle.
112	34	"Embezzler's Harvest"	Paul Landres	George W. Trendle, William Bruckner, Steve McCarthy	April 30, 1953
The Lone Ranger wants to clear the name of a man wrongly who was murdered by those who accused him of embezzlement.
113	35	"El Toro"	Paul Landres	George W. Trendle, Charles Larson, Dan Beattie	May 7, 1953
The Lone Ranger and Tonto need the intervention of his nephew Dan Reid to save them from murder by outlaw El Toro.
114	36	"The Brown Pony"	Paul Landres	George W. Trendle, David P. Sheppard, Ralph Goll	May 14, 1953
A young boy's mother wants to sell his pony to pay extortion.
115	37	"Triple Cross"	John H. Morse	George W. Trendle, Joe Richardson, Ralph Goll	May 21, 1953
Someone confesses to robbery but refuses to reveal the whereabouts of the money.
116	38	"The Wake of War"	John H. Morse	George W. Trendle, William Bruckner	May 28, 1953
Old grudges about the American Civil War rise to the surface.
117	39	"Death in the Forest"	John H. Morse	George W. Trendle, Charles Larson, Fran Striker	June 4, 1953
A plot to assassinate the territorial governor is uncovered.
118	40	"The Gentleman from Julesburg"	Paul Landres	George W. Trendle, George B. Seitz Jr.	June 11, 1953
A homeless man bears a striking resemblance to a famous gambler.
119	41	"Hidden Fortune"	Paul Landres	George W. Trendle, Curtis Kenyon	June 18, 1953
After 10 years in prison for robbery, a man is released only to find a house built over the spot where he stashed the stolen loot.
120	42	"The Old Cowboy"	Paul Landres	George W. Trendle, Terence Maples, Fran Striker	June 25, 1953
Crooks try to swindle a partially blind man of his land.
121	43	"Woman from Omaha"	John H. Morse	George W. Trendle, Robert Halff, Fran Striker	July 2, 1953
Nell Martin (Minerva Urecal) arrives from Oklahoma to claim her inheritance.
122	44	"Gunpowder Joe"	John H. Morse	George W. Trendle, David P. Sheppard, Fran Striker	July 9, 1953
The outlaw Cavendish gang try to trick a gullible man into carriying out their nefarious plans.
123	45	"Midnight Rider"	John H. Morse	George W. Trendle, Curtis Kenyon, Fran Striker	July 16, 1953
Tonto and the Lone Ranger pursue outlaw Midnight Rider.
124	46	"Stage to Estacado"	John H. Morse	Steve McCarthy, David P. Sheppard	July 23, 1953
Flimflam man Dan Gerber meets Tonto and the Lone Ranger on a stage coach.
125	47	"The Perfect Crime"	Paul Landres	George W. Trendle, Terence Maples	July 30, 1953
A school teacher gets involved in robbery.
126	48	"The Ghost of Coyote Canyon"	Paul Landres	George W. Trendle, Joe Richardson	August 6, 1953
A gang of outlaws bamboozle townsfolk into believing their hideout is haunted.
127	49	"Old Bailey"	Paul Landres	George W. Trendle, Joe Richardson	August 13, 1953
Old Bailey is framed for murder by the very culprits who committed the crime.
128	50	"Prisoner in Jeopardy"	John H. Morse	George W. Trendle, Joe Richardson	August 20, 1953
A newly released prisoner is framed for robbery.
129	51	"Diamond in the Rough"	John H. Morse	George W. Trendle, David P. Sheppard	August 27, 1953
The Lone Ranger accompanies a group of diplomats.
130	52	"The Red Mark"	John H. Morse	George W. Trendle, David P. Sheppard, Fran Striker	September 3, 1953
The Lone Ranger encounters known criminal Hank Durgan

=== Season 4 (1954–55) ===
(Clayton Moore returns as the Lone Ranger.)

No. overall	No. in season	Title	Directed by	Written by	Original release date
131	1	"The Fugitive"	Wilhelm Thiele	George W. Trendle, Jack Laird, Betty Joyce	September 9, 1954
The Lone Ranger is instructed to locate Clay Trowbridge, a man wrongly convicted of robbery and murder but who'd broken out of jail to avoid a lynch mob. With the real instigator of the crimes in custody the race is on to find Clay before someone cashes in on the wanted dead or alive posters still in circulation. Clay, unaware of his pardon and desperate for money plans to actually commit a robbery. Will the Lone Ranger be able to find this innocent man before he really does become a criminal.
132	2	"Ex-Marshal"	Wilhelm Thiele	Betty Joyce, Charles Larson	September 16, 1954
While the Lone Ranger and Tonto are tracking the Compton gang they come across a famous law man Frank Dean who had faked his own death and dropped out from sight. The Ranger needs to come up with a plan that will not only take down the Compton gang but unravel the mystery behind the former lawman's unusual behavior.
133	3	"Message to Fort Apache"	Wilhelm Thiele	George W. Trendle, Harry Poppe Jr., Betty Joyce	September 23, 1954
The Lone Ranger gets involved in trying to break up a gang that is selling guns to Indians around Fort Apache. The gang knows the jig is nearly up, however they are waiting for payment by the Indians for one last shipment before heading for the Mexican border. Innocent lives are put at risk as the gang will stop at nothing to complete their deal. Can the Lone Ranger saves those put at risk by the gang and avoid another Indian war.
134	4	"The Frightened Woman"	Oscar Rudolph	George W. Trendle, Bert Lambert, Fran Striker	September 30, 1954
Tonto witnesses a robbery in "Powder Bend" The local sheriff thinks he is connected with the event and tries to arrest him. Tonto escapes and with the help of the Lone Ranger intends to find the bandit.
135	5	"Gold Town"	Oscar Rudolph	George W. Trendle, Robert Schaefer, Eric Freiwald, Fran Striker	October 7, 1954
The death of a prospector leads to the Lone Ranger inheriting half the value of a gold mine. Bandits kidnap the other person to inherit the money and attempt to impersonate him.
136	6	"Six Gun Sanctuary"	Wilhelm Thiele	George W. Trendle, William Bruckner	October 14, 1954
The Lone Ranger and Tonto are puzzled over the number of outlaws that have recently disappeared. They soon discover Reedville has been set up as a sanctuary for wanted criminals.
137	7	"Outlaw's Trail"	Oscar Rudolph	George W. Trendle, Oscar Larson, Fran Striker	October 21, 1954
The Lone Ranger tracks an outlaw, Reno Lawrence to the small town of Painted Post. There he discovers conflict between the ranchers and farmers. He also discovers the sheriff and deputy may have a hidden past.
138	8	"Stage to Teshimingo"	Oscar Rudolph	George W. Trendle, Elwood Ullman, Betty Joyce	October 28, 1954
Tonto and the Lone Ranger travel to the town of Gunsight to investigate a series of stranger stage coach robberies. It appears someone is trying to put the local stage coach company out of business. But who, and more importantly why?.
139	9	"Texas Draw"	Oscar Rudolph	George W. Trendle, Robert Schaefer, Eric Freiwald, Dan Beattie	November 4, 1954
The Lone Ranger breaks up a fight between John Thorpe a land owner and a gang led by Crane Dillion. Then a third man William Hubbard arrives in the town on a strange mission.
140	10	"Rendezvous at Whipsaw"	Oscar Rudolph	George W. Trendle, Joe Richardson	November 11, 1954
Tonto, while riding into the town of Whipsaw encounters a someone trying to kill Mrs Mac, star witness in an up coming trial of Bat Larson. The Lone Ranger decides to go into the town to help protect other witnesses who may be in danger.
141	11	"Dan Reid's Fight for Life"	Wilhelm Thiele	George W. Trendle, Harry Poppe Jr., Dan Beattie	November 18, 1954
Dan Reid, the Lone Ranger's nephew, sees Texas Ranger Roy Barnett John Stephenson ambushed by two outlaws. Barnett survives the attack and explains he has been tracking the Cardoza gang. The Lone Ranger decides to team up with Barnett and try to stop the gang. With Nacho Galinda.
142	12	"Tenderfoot"	Wilhelm Thiele	George W. Trendle, Curtis Kenyon, Fran Striker	November 25, 1954 November 25, 1954
The Lone Ranger and Tonto come across dead cattle and a poisoned water hole on a ranch. They suspect they have stumbled onto a range war and decide to investigate what is going on.
143	13	"A Broken Match"	Wilhelm Thiele	George W. Trendle, Harry Poppe Jr.	December 2, 1954
The Lone Ranger comes across a double murder and former criminal Jeff Williams discovered nearby. It is assumed by the local sheriff that Williams is guilty, but the Lone Ranger and Tonto have their doubts.
144	14	"Colorado Gold"	Oscar Rudolph	George W. Trendle, Tom Seller, Fran Striker	December 9, 1954
The Lone Ranger receives a letter from an old friend explaining her son is coming out to look at a goldmine that reports indicate has gone dry. The Lone Ranger decides to do all he can to help the tenderfoot in his investigation.
145	15	"Homer With a High Hat"	Wilhelm Thiele	George W. Trendle, Jack Laird, Ralph Goll	December 16, 1954
The Lone Ranger and Tonto are on the way to Mordock City on the trail of missing gold from a recent robbery. A practical joke played on a visitor to the town puts his life in jeopardy, and any chance of finding the gold even more remote.
146	16	"Two for Juan Ringo"	Wilhelm Thiele	George W. Trendle, Joe Richardson, Fran Striker	December 23, 1954
The Lone Ranger and Tonto arrive in Border City to see his secret banker, George Wilson. Wilson explains things have become tough, Edward Ashton a well known criminal has been slowly taking over the town. The Lone Ranger decides he needs to shut down Ashton's operation.
147	17	"The Globe"	Oscar Rudolph	George W. Trendle, Jack Laird, Fran Striker	December 30, 1954
Tonto witnesses the shooting of an old prospector 'Cherokee' flush with money from the sale of a disused gold mine. The Lone Ranger decides they need to investigate when he realizes the motive of the shooting was not robbery.
148	18	"Dan Reid's Sacrifice"	Oscar Rudolph	George W. Trendle, William Bruckner	January 6, 1955
The Lone Ranger and Tonto become increasingly frustrated over a series of horse rustling incidents in the area. After two weeks they are no closer to identifying the gang responsible.
149	19	"Enfield Rifle"	Oscar Rudolph	George W. Trendle, Albert Duffy, Fran Striker	January 13, 1955
Mr Vale, the local Indian agent at Fort Manning gets word an Army pay shipment is arriving the next day. He alerts the local Indians and arranges for them to steal the money and use it to buy guns. The Lone Ranger must stop Vale and the Indians if he wishes to avoid a full blown Indian War.
150	20	"The School Story"	Oscar Rudolph	George W. Trendle, George Van Marter, Steve McCarthy	January 20, 1955
The town of Rugged Gap has raised money for a new school. Tonto is wrongly accused of stealing the money when a group of men disguised as Indians steal the funds. The Lone Ranger is outraged at the theft and realizes he needs to clear Tonto's name.
151	21	"The Quiet Highwayman"	Oscar Rudolph	George W. Trendle, Jack Laird, Dan Beattie	January 27, 1955
The town of Bakerville has been terrorized by the "Quiet Highwayman' The local law is powerless to stop the attacks. The Lone Ranger is called in by the United States Marshall to try to apprehend them.
152	22	"Heritage of Treason"	Oscar Rudolph	George W. Trendle, Samuel Rice, Charles Larson, Fran Striker	February 3, 1955
Ace Martin and Windy, two confidence men approach a local land owner Mr Halsted with a scheme that could see Mr Halsted owning the entire Arizona territory. The Lone Ranger must stop the scheme before Mr Halsted loses everything he owns.
153	23	"The Lost Chalice"	Charles D. Livingstone	George W. Trendle, George Van Marter, Charles Larson	February 10, 1955
The Lone Ranger and Tonto stop to visit their old friend 'The padre' to see what they could do to help with a lack of water. While there, an old chalice is stolen from the Church. As the Lone Ranger tries to discover who stole the cup, it becomes apparent there is something far more valuable at stake.
154	24	"Code of the Pioneers"	Wilhelm Thiele	George W. Trendle, Lillian Rose, Charles Larson	February 17, 1955
A ruthless town boss arranges a wave of robbery and murder to discredit the town marshal and steals the printing equipment of an unsupportive newspaper to get his candidate for sheriff elected.
155	25	"The Law Lady"	Oscar Rudolph	George W. Trendle, Charles Larson, Ralph Goll	February 24, 1955
The Lone Ranger discovers that the sheriff of Gunstock has been murdered and his widow has taken his place. Tonto and the Lone Ranger head for town to try to solve the murder.
156	26	"Uncle Ed"	Oscar Rudolph	George W. Trendle, Joe Richardson, Dan Beattie	March 3, 1955
The Lone Ranger and Tonto encounter and old man, uncle Ed and explain he needs to keep an eye out for Lefty Mott's gang. Uncle Ed feels there is a chance for him to prove his usefulness again and goes after the gang.
157	27	"Jornada Del Muerto"	Oscar Rudolph	George W. Trendle, Charles Larson, Tom Dougall	March 10, 1955
The Lone Ranger come across a scout wounded and dying from an Indian attack. Before he becomes unconscious he tells the Lone Ranger that a white man who has gone native and now called Crazy Wolf was responsible.
158	28	"Sunstroke Mesa"	Oscar Rudolph	George W. Trendle, Robert Schaefer, Eric Freiwald, Dan Beattie	March 17, 1955
Dan rides into Mesa City to make a donation to the local town for their irrigation project. Before the money is secured it is stolen. Dan rides after the outlaws to try to get the money back. The Lone Ranger realizes the danger Dan is in and the need to catch the criminals.
159	29	"Sawtelle Saga's End"	Charles D. Livingstone	George W. Trendle, Samuel Rice, Felix Holt	March 24, 1955
The Lone Ranger on the trail of two slippery masked robbers find they are the nephews of an ostensibly law abiding woman who cynically manages the nephew's criminal activities.
160	30	"The Too-Perfect Signature"	Wilhelm Thiele	George W. Trendle, Harry Poppe Jr.	March 31, 1955
A change in railway planning makes the ranch owned by Tom Tabor extremely valuable. A number of people heavily invested in where the railway is to run become extremely interested in purchasing Tom's ranch.
161	31	"Trigger Finger"	Wilhelm Thiele	George W. Trendle, Lee Berg, Frank L. Moss, Robert Schaefer, Eric Freiwald, Fran Striker	April 7, 1955
The Lone Ranger and sheriff John Trent find a stage with a dead driver and the gold on board missing. Following the trail left by the outlaws, they find and shoot Hook Mason. The local newspaper begin a campaign against the sheriff accusing him of shooting an innocent man.
162	32	"The Tell-Tale Bullet"	Wilhelm Thiele	George W. Trendle, Joe Richardson, Fran Striker	April 14, 1955
While visiting the town of Jarvis, the Lone Ranger learns that the outlaw Cash Nasby has been released from jail. The Lone Ranger does not believe Nasby could by reformed in just two years and decides to follow him and see what he is planning.
163	33	"False Accusation"	Oscar Rudolph	George W. Trendle, Charles Larson, Dan Beattie	April 21, 1955
The Lone Ranger gets word that the town of Rock Point New Mexico is being terrorized by a strange midnight rider who has been staging hold ups all over New Mexico. The Lone Ranger decides to investigate.
164	34	"Gold Freight"	Oscar Rudolph	George W. Trendle, Joe Richardson, Fran Striker	April 28, 1955
Dan reports a freight line war between two agents is developing in Eagle City. The Lone Ranger fears one of them might abuse their monopoly further damaging the economy of the area.
165	35	"Wanted: The Lone Ranger"	Oscar Rudolph	George W. Trendle, Tom Seller	May 5, 1955
The Lone Ranger and Tonto have been involved in an ongoing action against the inhabitants of Windgate City. A town set up as a refuge for any outlaw seeking sanctuary.
166	36	"The Woman in the White Mask"	Wilhelm Thiele	George W. Trendle, Robert Schaefer, Eric Freiwald, Dan Beattie	May 12, 1955
The Lone Ranger and Dan encounter a stage drive who'd been shot. He explains he was attacked by the Woman in the white mask gang. The Lone Ranger decides to investigate and try to break up the gang.
167	37	"The Bounty Hunter"	Wilhelm Thiele	George W. Trendle, Curtis Kenyon, Betty Joyce	May 19, 1955
The Lone Ranger intercepts Glen Bolton's gang when they attempt a holdup of a stage. Bolton is wounded and seeks help from one of the local people.
168	38	"Showdown at Sand Creek"	Wilhelm Thiele	George W. Trendle, Robert Schaefer, Eric Freiwald	May 26, 1955
The Lone Ranger is on the way to Sand Creek to see Sheriff Clay Huston when they receive news the sheriff's been killed. The Lone Ranger does not think it is a coincidence that long time outlaw Willie Brady has also arrived in town.
169	39	"Heart of a Cheater"	Wilhelm Thiele	George W. Trendle, Bert Lambert, Fran Striker	June 2, 1955
Dan, while collecting supplies from Dravis witnesses a bank hold up. The Lone Ranger follows the trail and come across a farm, the two are connected and the Ranger needs to figure out how.
170	40	"The Swami"	Wilhelm Thiele	George W. Trendle, Joe Richardson	June 9, 1955
The Lone Ranger visit an old friend Hardrock Hazen, only to discover the man has been shot and wounded. Meanwhile Dan has a strange encounter with Swami Yoganto while traveling through Rockville.
171	41	"Sheriff's Sale"	Oscar Rudolph	George W. Trendle, Joe Richardson, Fran Striker	June 16, 1955
The Lone Ranger hears that an old friend sheriff Jack Morrison is having trouble with an outlaw Hutch Conant who has been slowly taking over a local town by applying economic pressure to the locals and forcing them to stay quiet.
172	42	"Six-Gun Artist"	Oscar Rudolph	George W. Trendle, Joe Richardson	June 23, 1955
The Lone Ranger and Tonto hear of a string of stage coach robberies in the area. They head for Mesa Junction where the Lone Ranger thinks the gang is located.
173	43	"Death Goes to Press"	Wilhelm Thiele	Jack Laird, Ralph Goll	June 30, 1955
The Lone Ranger and Tonto get word that Sheriff Hubbard is under pressure from the press in Cactus City about his performance and morals. The Lone Ranger knows the sheriff well and decides to go to the town to see what the truth is.
174	44	"The Return of Dice Dawson"	Wilhelm Thiele	George W. Trendle, Joe Richardson	July 7, 1955
Dice Dawson, a well known outlaw to the Lone Ranger has become active again around Elliot City. The Lone Ranger goes to investigate, but he has doubts about Dawson's activity and wants to uncover the real truth.
175	45	"Adventure at Arbuckle"	Charles D. Livingstone	George W. Trendle, Joe Richardson	July 14, 1955
The Lone Ranger gets news that the town of Arbuckle has been over run by outlaws and is now being used as a sanctuary. Using a disguise he decides to infiltrate the town and see what the situation is.
176	46	"The Return"	Charles D. Livingstone	George W. Trendle, Charles Larson	July 21, 1955
The Lone Ranger saves a woman from outlaws only to discover he'd recently jailed her brother for murder. She goes to her brother to find out what the real situation is.
177	47	"Framed for Murder"	Wilhelm Thiele	Harry Poppe Jr., Fran Striker	July 28, 1955
Jim Blake strikes it rich with a gold claim. He insists a local shop keeper be declared a partner. Unknown to Jim, the shop keeper has a dark past and is being blackmailed.
178	48	"Trapped"	Wilhelm Thiele	George W. Trendle, Harry Poppe Jr.	August 4, 1955
Gaff Morgan and Jack Hall escape from a local prison. The Lone Ranger and Tonto decide to track the two down and bring them to justice, but Morgan and Hall are following their own plan.
179	49	"The Bait: Gold!"	Wilhelm Thiele	George W. Trendle, Harry Poppe Jr.	August 11, 1955
The Lone Ranger and Tonto see a stage being robbed and ride to intercept the bandits. After securing the situation, the Lone Ranger realizes the holdup is part of a string of such robberies and decides to get to the bottom of the mystery.
180	50	"The Sheriff's Wife"	Wilhelm Thiele	George W. Trendle, Bert Lambert, Charles Larson, Dan Beattie	August 18, 1955
The Lone Ranger and Tonto gets word that Parkersburg is being threatened by two violent criminals, the Miles brothers. The Lone Ranger and Tonto decide to go to Parkersburg and capture the two criminals.
181	51	"Counterfeit Redskins"	Wilhelm Thiele	George W. Trendle, Jack Laird, Jack Laird	August 25, 1955
Three men dress as Indians to try to intimidate local homesteaders into moving out or attacking the real local Indians. Either way the land owners run the risk of losing their land.
182	52	"One Nation, Indivisible"	Wilhelm Thiele	George W. Trendle, Harry Poppe Jr., Harry Poppe Jr.	September 1, 1955
Two brothers, working their way west after they lose their farm because of the Civil War, encounter the Lone Ranger and learn about what a future can be if they can let go of the past.

=== Season 5 (1956–57) ===
(This season was filmed in color.)

No. overall	No. in season	Title	Directed by	Written by	Original release date
183	1	"The Wooden Rifle"	Earl Bellamy	Doane R. Hoag, George W. Trendle	September 13, 1956
A young boy sees a man shot and killed. Things become complicated when it appears a man is being framed for the murder.
184	2	"The Sheriff of Smoke Tree"	Oscar Rudolph	Wells Root, George W. Trendle	September 20, 1956
A young man with no experience takes on the position as the new law man in a town. After a rocky start a chance encounter with the Lone Ranger and some encouraging words see the young man become surprisingly good at the job.
185	3	"The Counterfeit Mask"	Earl Bellamy	Doane R. Hoag, George W. Trendle	September 27, 1956
A bandit has been impersonating the Lone Ranger, tarnishing his reputation as he robs and kills innocent people. The Lone Ranger is surprised when he is arrested by an old friend, the local sheriff.
186	4	"No Handicap"	Oscar Rudolph	Tom Seller, George W. Trendle	October 4, 1956
The Douglas gang commit a series of violent crimes and a soon to retire sheriff is blinded during one of the robberies. The Lone Ranger attempts to try to make things right.
187	5	"The Cross of Santo Domingo"	Earl Bellamy	Tom Seller, George W. Trendle	October 11, 1956
The Lone Ranger meets a monk who has just been robbed of a valuable religious relic. He with Tonto set out to capture the outlaws and return the relic to the people of Santo Domingo.
188	6	"White Hawk's Decision"	Earl Bellamy	Robert Schaefer, Eric Freiwald, George W. Trendle	October 18, 1956
The Lone Ranger and Tonto arrive at an Indian village which is in conflict after the arrival of a college educated Indian amongst them. The Lone Ranger must try to bring peace to the group and allow them to move forward in developing the country around them.
189	7	"The Return of Don Pedro O'Sullivan"	Oscar Rudolph	Tom Seller, George W. Trendle	October 25, 1956
When Don Pedro O'Sullivan tries to return to Mexico to battle an army colonel who is ruling his district according to his own whims, the petty dictator sends his henchmen to intercept and eliminate the aging gentleman. After thwarting one attempt on Don Pedro's life, the Lone Ranger and Tonto disguise themselves as the Don and his valet in order to lure the owlhoots into pursuing them instead. The two heroes succeed all too well, as the assassins capture them and the Don's daughter, and plan to have them all shot by a firing squad.
190	8	"Quicksand"	Earl Bellamy	Walker A. Tompkins, Robert Leslie Bellem, George W. Trendle	November 1, 1956
The Lone Ranger and Tonto find an injured man who is building a school house on his own. They learn from him that the school is the project of an Indian girl who wanted to have a school for Indians. She was given $10,000 to help build the school but two men, one of whom is an Indian who worked for her, killed her and took the gold. It seems like they encountered the men previously. The Indian is still out there but the other one had been caught and is going to be hanged that day. Tonto goes to the town to get a wagon for the injured man. But the lawyer of the man.
191	9	"Quarter Horse War"	Earl Bellamy	Jack Natteford, George W. Trendle	November 8, 1956
The Lone Ranger attends a quarter horse race and has to find a way to stop a group of Indians going on the war path after their winnings from the race are stolen.
192	10	"The Letter Bride"	Oscar Rudolph	Wells Root, George W. Trendle	November 15, 1956
A Chinese laundryman (Victor Sen Yung) who is a friend of the Ranger's, is expecting his bride from China who is arriving. But she's taken by some men in masks. Later the Ranger and Tonto arrive and learn that she was abducted by bigots who wants their friend to leave town. So they set a trap for them so they can find out who they are and hopefully where they are holding her.
193	11	"Hot Spell in Panamint"	Earl Bellamy	Hilary Creston Rhodes, George W. Trendle	November 22, 1956
The Lone Ranger becomes involved in trying to help a sheriff who is facing down a whole gang of outlaws after one of their number is arrested.
194	12	"The Twisted Track"	Earl Bellamy	Robert Schaefer, Eric Freiwald, George W. Trendle	November 29, 1956
The Lone Ranger has to try to stop two ex-Southern soldiers attempting to kill an important railroad owner who was a former Northern commander during the war.
195	13	"Decision for Chris McKeever"	Earl Bellamy	Tom Seller, George W. Trendle	December 6, 1956
The Lone Ranger and Tonto capture three criminals. The problem is it is a 5 day ride to the nearest town. Somehow the pair must stay on track to the town while making sure the criminals don't try to kill them.
196	14	"Trouble at Tylerville"	Oscar Rudolph	Tom Seller, George W. Trendle	December 13, 1956
The Lone Ranger and Tonto visit Tylerville to check how a recently released bank robber is getting on adjusting to life in a small town.
197	15	"Christmas Story"	Earl Bellamy	Robert Schaefer, Eric Freiwald, George W. Trendle	December 20, 1956
The Lone Ranger meets a young boy whose Christmas wish is to be re-united with his father. The Lone Ranger and Tonto go on a quest to find the boy's father and grant the boy his wish.
198	16	"Ghost Canyon"	Earl Bellamy	Hal G. Evarts, Melvin Levy, Fran Striker	December 27, 1956
The Lone Ranger becomes involved after a number of Indians are killed while watching their cattle herd.
199	17	"Outlaw Masquerade"	Earl Bellamy	Robert Schaefer, Eric Freiwald, George W. Trendle	January 3, 1957
After the Cameron gang is captured and jailed, the question of all the gold they stole remains unanswered. Tonto agrees to pose as a convict to try an infiltrate the gang and get clues to where the gold is.
200	18	"The Avenger"	Oscar Rudolph	Robert Leslie Bellem, Herbert Purdom	January 10, 1957
The Lone Ranger and Tonto arrive in Cottonwood in time to see a law reformer gunned down by an outlaw. The mood in the town is such that the Lone Ranger has to also protect the outlaw from outraged citizens, and the sheriff---the reformer's fanatical son.
201	19	"The Courage of Tonto"	Earl Bellamy	Doane R. Hoag, George W. Trendle	January 17, 1957
The Lone Ranger becomes involved in conflict between settlers and a local Indian tribe. The settlers seem intent on provoking the Indians into going to war.
202	20	"The Breaking Point"	Earl Bellamy	Robert Leslie Bellem, Hilary Creston Rhodes, George W. Trendle	January 24, 1957
The Lone Ranger encounters a riderless horse with saddlebags loaded with gold. He begins the process of backtracking events to try to discover who the person was and what has happened to him.
203	21	"A Harp for Hannah"	Earl Bellamy	Herbert Purdom, George W. Trendle	January 31, 1957
The Lone Ranger attempts to gain justice for a man robbed by the son of a powerful ranching family.
204	22	"A Message from Abe"	Earl Bellamy	DeVallon Scott, George W. Trendle, Abraham Lincoln	February 7, 1957
The Ranger and Tonto visit apparently reformed ex-con Phil Beach on Lincoln's Birthday.
205	23	"Code of Honor"	Earl Bellamy	Robert Schaefer, Eric Freiwald, George W. Trendle	February 14, 1957
The Lone Ranger and Tonto encounter a man who seems to have just been robbed by an officer in the US cavalry. The Ranger is struggling with how such a good man become an outlaw.
206	24	"The Turning Point"	Earl Bellamy	Charles Larson, George W. Trendle	February 21, 1957
A group of vigilantes corner and kill a seemingly innocent cowboy in Blue Creek. One of the townspeople contacts the Lone Ranger and asks him to try to deal with the growing power of these men.
207	25	"Dead-Eye"	Earl Bellamy	Wells Root, Robert Leslie Bellem, George W. Trendle	February 28, 1957
Jake Beaudry's reputation as an outlaw attract's the attention of a famous sheriff. The sheriff is not as good as he once was and reluctantly accepts the help of the Lone Ranger.
208	26	"Clover in the Dust"	Earl Bellamy	Doane R. Hoag, George W. Trendle	March 7, 1957
A young man is found dead. His father blames another local rancher and goes on the trail of revenge. The Lone Ranger doubts the guilt of the rancher and goes on a quest to find the truth.
209	27	"Slim's Boy"	Earl Bellamy	Doane R. Hoag, George W. Trendle	March 14, 1957
The Lone Ranger is on the way to visit an old friend, Sam Masters, a renowned fast gunman and marshal. On the way he encounters an old outlaw also looking for Sam.
210	28	"Two Against Two"	Earl Bellamy	Tom Seller, George W. Trendle	March 21, 1957
Vic Foley escapes from jail and the Lone Ranger gives chase. Although it would be an easy arrest the Lone Ranger hangs back hoping Foley will lead him to unrecovered gold.
211	29	"Ghost Town Fury"	Earl Bellamy	Eric Freiwald, Robert Schaefer, George W. Trendle	March 28, 1957
The Clantons break out of jail and go on a crime spree. The Lone Range vows to track them down, but first he must learn more about where the gang might be hiding out - "The Badlands".
212	30	"The Prince of Buffalo Gap"	Earl Bellamy	Tom Seller, George W. Trendle	April 4, 1957
The Lone Ranger and Tonto are on the trail of Matt Cagle. He seems to have headed for a tiny town "Buffalo Gap" The Lone Ranger is puzzled why the man has chosen such a course of action.
213	31	"The Law and Miss Aggie"	Oscar Rudolph	Tom Seller, George W. Trendle	April 11, 1957
The Lone Ranger becomes involved when a group of Indians are on the way to a special government meeting are attacked by a local land owner.
214	32	"The Tarnished Star"	Earl Bellamy	Doane R. Hoag, George W. Trendle	April 18, 1957
The sheriff of Peaceful valley carries a dark secret that puts his ability to maintain the law in jeopardy.
215	33	"Canuck"	Oscar Rudolph	Orville H. Hampton, Edmond Kelso, George W. Trendle	April 25, 1957
Canadian settlers are being blamed by local ranchers for cattle rustling and horse stealing. The Lone Ranger must seek the truth and try to restore order to a once peaceful area.
216	34	"Mission for Tonto"	Earl Bellamy	Tom Seller, George W. Trendle	May 2, 1957
The Lone Ranger and Tonto find a boy who has been shot floating in a river. After they find out the boy's story the Ranger decides to try to bring the shooter to justice.
217	35	"Journey to San Carlos"	Earl Bellamy	Charles Larson, George W. Trendle	May 9, 1957
The Lone Ranger and Tonto capture two renegade Indians responsible for a recent attack. Tonto points out the strange marking on their face. The Lone Ranger decides to investigate why peaceful Indians have suddenly taken to war and what the new marking on their faces mean.
218	36	"The Banker's Son"	Earl Bellamy	Charles Larson, Robert Leslie Bellem, George W. Trendle	May 16, 1957
Tonto witnesses a murder and reports it to the local sheriff. He then tells the Lone Ranger that he thinks the sheriff is not capable of handling the investigation properly.
219	37	"The Angel and the Outlaw"	Oscar Rudolph	Robert Schaefer, Eric Freiwald, George W. Trendle	May 23, 1957
Tonto witnesses the Calico Kid's gang rob a bank. The Lone Ranger sees it as an opportunity to catch an outlaw that has been on the run for years.
220	38	"Blind Witness"	Earl Bellamy	Robert Leslie Bellem, George W. Trendle	May 30, 1957
The Grody Brothers rob the express office in Flat Rock and are in cahoots with an unlikely ally.
221	39	"Outlaws in Grease Paint"	Oscar Rudolph	Tom Seller, George W. Trendle	June 6, 1957
Actors Lavinia and Dewitt Faversham are behind many robberies throughout the West, but when they arrive in Cedar Springs they might have met their match.

== Availability ==
In the United States the first 16 episodes from Season One are in the public domain. "A Message from Abe" (episode 204, Season Five) is also in the public domain.
