= The Black Dakotas =

1954 film by Ray Nazarro

- Film poster
- Directed by: Ray Nazarro
- Written by: Ray Buffum; DeVallon Scott
- Produced by: Wallace MacDonald
- Starring: Gary Merrill; Wanda Hendrix; John Bromfield
- Cinematography: Ellis W. Carter
- Edited by: Aaron Stell
- Music by: Mischa Bakaleinikoff
- Production company: Columbia Pictures
- Distributed by: Columbia Pictures
- Release date: September 2, 1954
- Running time: 65 minutes
- Country: United States
- Language: English

The Black Dakotas is a 1954 American Technicolor Western spy film directed by Ray Nazarro and produced by Columbia Pictures. Set during the American Civil War and filmed at the Iverson Movie Ranch, the film stars Gary Merrill as a cold-blooded secret agent using the war for his own ends. It also stars Wanda Hendrix and John Bromfield. The film features The Lone Ranger television series' Jay Silverheels and Clayton Moore in separate roles, as well as Richard Webb of Captain Midnight.

== Plot ==
Over footage from The Man from Colorado, opening titles inform the audience that during the Civil War, the Confederate States of America sent agitators to the American West to incite Indian tribes against the federal government to draw troops away from battles in the east.

In 1864, a stagecoach containing two passengers is attacked by an armed band, who kill the driver and stop the stage. One of the passengers, Zachary Paige, offers the armed but polite band his money, but is surprised when they inform him that they are not interested in his money, but know his identity as a diplomatic emissary of President Abraham Lincoln's, sent to the Dakota Territory to negotiate a treaty with the Sioux that includes payment of $130,000 in gold to the tribe. The band take his credentials, and Paige is further surprised when his travelling companion, Brock Marsh, tells him he is a secret agent of the Confederacy who will impersonate Paige in his diplomacy, but will use the opportunity to break the promises and lure the Sioux into attacking the White settlements. The leader of the band, John Lawrence, informs Paige he will be held until after Marsh completes his mission, then released. As Lawrence goes away, Marsh further explains his mission in a courteous manner, then shoots and kills Paige to protect the mission to the surprise of Lawrence and his band.

Arriving in the nearest city, Marsh as Paige informs the town authorities of his mission and tells them his stage was attacked by an armed Indian band. Marsh meets "Gimpy" Joe Woods, who offers to take him to the Sioux, but Marsh chooses Daugherty to take him, instead. Before their departure, a posse brings in John Lawrence, whom they have identified as a Confederate agent, and seek to lynch him. The lynch mob becomes an impromptu court run by Judge Baker, who tries Lawrence for treason on the spot and sentences him to hanging. Gimpy implores Marsh as Paige to use his federal authority to make the case a federal matter, and defer Lawrence's fate to a trial by federal authorities. Marsh refuses, and Lawrence is hanged in front of his daughter Ruth, who swears vengeance on the town and its population. Gimpy takes Marsh aside and reveals himself as Lawrence's second in command, and asks him why he did not save Lawrence; Marsh replies that his mission is more important to the Confederacy.

Daugherty informs Marsh that though Chief War Cloud is a reasonable man, his son Black Buffalo desires the extermination of all Whites. Proving his point, the pair are attacked by a war party led by Black Buffalo, in which his brother is killed by a proficient pistol shot by Marsh. The pair split up where Daugherty escapes, but Marsh is captured. When Marsh realizes that Black Buffalo is not interested in the peace treaty, and will burn him alive, the clever Marsh shames the Indians that they are cowards and will be punished in the afterlife for not giving a prisoner a fair and sporting chance for his life. Marsh is pitted against a brave, both armed with knives, in a fight to the death that Marsh wins by throwing his knife into the brave's back, gaining him time for a rescue by Daugherty's posse.

Upon return to the town where Marsh intends to buy drinks for the posse, he is called into the office of Judge Baker and Marshal Collins, who show him the body of the real Paige, who was buried in a shallow grave dug up by coyotes. As he is dressed as an Easterner and not dressed for riding, the only possible way he could have come to the area would be as a passenger on the stage on which Marsh came in. Marsh denies he had a travelling companion; as the marshal and judge examine the body, they find a label in the dead man's jacket with the name of Zachary Paige. As Marsh draws his pistol, the pair are shot in the back from an open window by Gimpy armed with a rifle. When the townspeople burst in and see Marsh's weapon unfired, they believe Ruth Lawrence is responsible.

Mike asks Marsh to keep the men in town so he can warn Ruth. Marsh rips off the label in the jacket to prevent exposure. Gimpy shows up and tells Ruth he knows she did not kill the sheriff and judge. Gimpy and his cohorts ride away with Mike (unconscious) and Ruth. Gimpy meets with Marsh to tell him he will take him to Chief War Cloud tomorrow morning.

Gimpy and Marsh arrive at Sioux camp. Chief War Cloud meets with Marsh to discuss the treaty. He gives the chief a signed copy of the treaty offering the gold. War Cloud gives him three days to pay him the gold. Ruth talks with the confederates about the stagecoach and gold. They tell her that the gold will be used to support the South. Gimpy and Marsh arrive at the confederate camp. Marsh admits to Ruth who he is, and that he will double-cross the Sioux and break the treaty. Ruth agrees to help him. A man arrives with the location of the stage which is 3 hours behind him. Ruth takes Mike coffee and frees him. He escapes on a horse and is quickly pursued. Marsh kills both of the pursuers. Mike sees all this from his hiding place and tells Ruth. They go to town for help.

Marsh and three confederates attack the stagecoach and kill the soldiers. Gimpy and he take the gold. Ruth arrives with her shotgun, but is overpowered by Marsh. Marsh kills Gimpy and takes the gold for himself. The Sioux arrive and free Ruth. Mike pursues Marsh and they fight. Mike defeats him. Mike presents the treaty and gold to War Cloud, who signs the treaty.

== Cast ==
- Gary Merrill as Brock Marsh / Zachary Paige
- Wanda Hendrix as Ruth Lawrence
- John Bromfield as Mike Daugherty
- Noah Beery Jr. as "Gimpy" Joe Woods
- Jay Silverheels as Black Buffalo
- Fay Roope as John Lawrence
- Howard Wendell as Judge Horatio Baker
- Robert F. Simon as U.S. Marshal Whit Collins
- James Griffith as Warren
- Richard Webb as Frank Gibbs
- Peter Whitney as Grimes
- John War Eagle as War Cloud
- Clayton Moore as Stone
