= The Lone Ranger (1956 film) =

1956 film by Stuart Heisler

- Theatrical release poster
- Directed by: Stuart Heisler
- Screenplay by: Herb Meadow; Eric Freiwald
- Based on: The Lone Ranger 1949-1952; 1954-1957 TV series by Fran Striker George Trendle; The Lone Ranger 1933-1955 radio series by Fran Striker
- Produced by: Willis Goldbeck; Jack Wrather
- Starring: Clayton Moore; Jay Silverheels; Beverly Washburn
- Cinematography: Edwin B. DuPar
- Edited by: Clarence Kolster
- Music by: David Buttolph
- Color process: WarnerColor
- Production company: Wrather Productions
- Distributed by: Warner Bros. Pictures
- Release date: February 25, 1956
- Running time: 81 minutes
- Country: United States
- Language: English
- Box office: $1,550,000 (US)

The Lone Ranger is a 1956 Western film based on The Lone Ranger television series starring Clayton Moore and Jay Silverheels. The Lone Ranger was the first of two theatrical features based on the series; it was followed by The Lone Ranger and the Lost City of Gold in 1958.

== Screenplay ==
Somewhere In Texas, the legendary masked man known as The Lone Ranger and his native colleague Tonto work to discover the reason why several white people are being massacred by some masked Indians. Meanwhile, a rich farmer known as Mr. Kilgore has a cruel plan in hand against the local Indian tribe: to provoke a war involving the natives and white ranchers. Kilgore plans to exploit "Spirit Mountain" in the Indian territory for its silver deposits. The Lone Ranger realizes that the natives wanted to keep settlers away so they would not discover and take control of the silver deposits. Kilgore, using his ranch hands disguised as Indians, attempts to begin a fierce conflict that would annihilate the tribe. The Lone Ranger's efforts to prevent the conflict are hampered by an internal power struggle between ailing Chief Red Hawk and the ambitious young Angry Horse.

The Masked Man and Tonto ultimately prevent the war between the ranchers and the Indians, and also defeat Angry Horse's bid to unseat Chief Red Hawk. Kilgore is fatally shot by his henchman, Cassidy, and peace is restored to the territory.

== Cast ==
- Clayton Moore as The Lone Ranger
- Jay Silverheels as Tonto
- Lyle Bettger as Reese Kilgore
- Bonita Granville as Welcome Kilgore
- Perry Lopez as Pete Ramirez
- Robert J. Wilke as Cassidy
- John Pickard as Sheriff Sam Kimberley
- Beverly Washburn as Lila Kilgore
- Michael Ansara as Angry Horse
- Frank de Kova as Chief Red Hawk
- Charles Meredith as Governor
- Mickey Simpson as Powder
- Lane Chandler as Chip Walker
- Zon Murray as Goss

The film was Bonita Granville's last credited appearance. She had retired from the screen to marry Jack Wrather in 1947.

== Production ==
Parts of the film were shot in Kanab Canyon, Barracks Canyon and Johnson Canyon in Utah.

== Reception ==
In a contemporary review for The New York Times, critic Bosley Crowther wrote: "You would think that, after all these years of championing law and order on the screen and radio, not to mention television, the Lone Ranger would be pooped. At least, you would think the people assigned to keeping him going would be tired of all those endless cattle rustles, slashing fist-fights, and western cliches. But apparently, a new team at Warners has taken over reviving the famous masked hero in all his glory in color and CinemaScope and has had at the task with the vigor of zealots inspired by a fresh idea. And 'The Lone Ranger,' which opened yesterday at the Mayfair, has the unwearied spirit of a noisy kid."

== Accolades ==
The Lone Ranger was nominated for the American Film Institute's list AFI's 100 Years...100 Heroes & Villains as a hero, while his line "Hi-Yo, Silver!" was nominated for the 2005 list AFI's 100 Years...100 Movie Quotes.

== See also ==
- List of American films of 1956
