= Hall of Great Western Performers =

Hall of fame for cowboys

Coordinates: 35°32′08″N 97°28′59″W

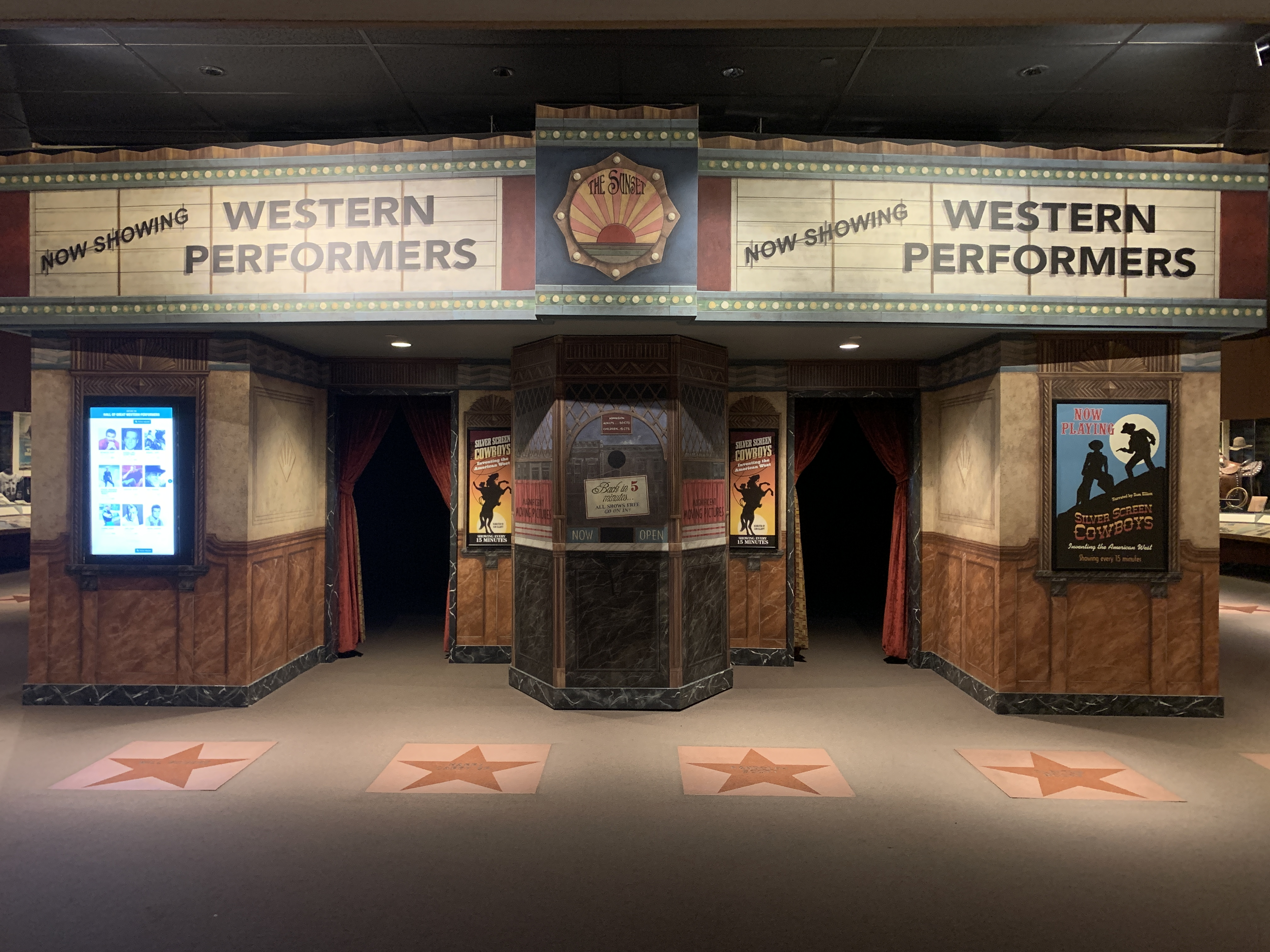
- Established: 1955
- Location: Oklahoma City, Oklahoma
- Type: Hall of fame
- Website: OfficialSite

The Hall of Great Western Performers (sometimes called the Western Performers Hall of Fame) is a hall of fame at the National Cowboy & Western Heritage Museum in Oklahoma City, Oklahoma. It is a 4,000-square-foot (370 m^{2}) presentation that explores how the American West has been interpreted in literature and film. Each year, the museum inducts performers to the hall in conjunction with the awarding of the Western Heritage Awards.

Honoring Western performers who have contributed to the making and preservation of the stories and legends of the West, the gallery also displays a presentation of the museum's extensive collection of memorabilia, including the John Wayne collection of personal firearms and artwork. Artifacts ranging from those associated with the 101 Ranch Wild West Show to those of recent Western films are included in the hall's extensive collection of movie posters and portraits.

== Hall of Fame members ==
The following are members of the Hall of Great Western Performers, with year of induction indicated:

- Rex Allen (1983)
- Broncho Billy Anderson (2002)
- Melissa Sue Anderson (1998)
- James Arness (1981)
- Jean Arthur (2014)
- Gene Autry (1972)
- Noah Beery Jr. (2024)
- Amanda Blake (1968)
- Ward Bond (2001)
- Ernest Borgnine (1996)
- Bruce Boxleitner (2012)
- William Boyd (1995)
- Walter Brennan (1970)
- Johnny Mack Brown (2008)
- John Carradine (2003)
- Keith Carradine (2024)
- Harry Carey Sr. (1976)
- Harry Carey Jr. (2003)
- Leo Carrillo (2013)
- James Coburn (2015)
- Chuck Connors (1991)
- Gary Cooper (1966)
- Kevin Costner (2019)
- Ken Curtis (1981)
- Andy Devine (2011)
- Kirk Douglas (1984)
- James Drury (1991)
- Robert Duvall (2004)
- Clint Eastwood (2000)
- Jack Elam (1994)
- Sam Elliott (2007)
- Dale Evans (1976)
- Richard Farnsworth (1997)
- Hugh Farr (1995)
- Karl Farr (1995)
- Henry Fonda (2005)
- Glenn Ford (1978)
- Victor French (1998)
- Robert Fuller (2008)
- James Garner (1990)
- Hoot Gibson (1979)
- Melissa Gilbert (1998)
- Vince Gill (1997)
- Karen Grassle (1998)
- Lindsay Greenbush (1998)
- Sidney Greenbush (1998)
- Graham Greene (2025)
- William S. Hart (1975)
- Gabby Hayes (2000)
- Charlton Heston (2010)
- Tim Holt (1991)
- Herb Jeffries (2004)
- Ben Johnson (1982)
- Buck Jones (1973)
- Tommy Lee Jones (2016)
- Howard Keel (2019)
- George Kennedy (2008)
- Alan Ladd (2017)
- Michael Landon (1998)
- Karl Malden (2005)
- Lee Marvin (2016)
- Ken Maynard (2015)
- Doug McClure (2014)
- Tim McCoy (1973)
- Joel McCrea (1969)
- Reba McEntire (1995)
- Steve McQueen (2007)
- Robert Mitchum (2013)
- Tom Mix (1958)
- Clayton Moore (1990)
- Harry Morgan (2006)
- Audie Murphy (1996)
- Bob Nolan (1995)
- Hugh O'Brian (1992)
- Maureen O'Hara (1993)
- Texas Jack Omohundro (1994)
- Jack Palance (1992)
- Fess Parker (2012)
- Gregory Peck (1979)
- Lloyd Perryman (1995)
- Lou Diamond Phillips (2023)
- Slim Pickens (1982)
- Anthony Quinn (2025)
- Ronald Reagan (1989)
- Duncan Renaldo (2013)
- Burt Reynolds (2022)
- Tex Ritter (1980)
- Dale Robertson (1983)
- Roy Rogers (1976)
- Katharine Ross (2014)
- Bing Russell (2021)
- Kurt Russell (2021)
- Randolph Scott (1975)
- Tom Selleck (2010)
- Jay Silverheels (1993)
- John Smith (2024)
- Sons of the Pioneers (1995)
- Tim Spencer (1995)
- Barbara Stanwyck (1973)
- Bob Steele (2016)
- James Stewart (1972)
- Milburn Stone (1981)
- Woody Strode (2021)
- Wes Studi (2013)
- Buck Taylor (2006)
- Dub Taylor (2009)
- Robert Taylor (1970)
- Clint Walker (2004)
- John Wayne (1974)
- Patrick Wayne (2017)
- Dennis Weaver (1981)
- Stuart Whitman (2011)
- Richard Widmark (2002)
- Bob Wills (2023)
- Morgan Woodward (2009)

== See also ==
- National Rodeo Hall of Fame
- Hall of Great Westerners
