= Target-Invisible =

1945 film

- Title card
- Starring: Arthur Kennedy; Clayton Moore
- Narrated by: Arthur Kennedy
- Production company: First Motion Picture Unit
- Distributed by: Motion Pictures and Special Events Division of the War Finance Division, U.S. Treasury Department
- Release date: 1945
- Running time: Eight minutes. 23 seconds
- Country: United States
- Language: English

Target-Invisible film

Target-Invisible is a 1945 documentary short film produced by the First Motion Picture Unit after World War II. The film depicts the uses of radar in aerial direction-finding and precision high-level bombing by the United States Army Air Forces during World War II.

At the end of Target-Invisible, the air force narrator (Arthur Kennedy) thanks Americans for their contributions to the war effort, which by then had concluded with Allied victory, and explains that the film was an example of the research and development being funded through the purchase of Victory Loan war bonds encouraging the viewer to buy and hold more such bonds to continue these projects into peacetime.

== Plot ==
In 1945, a USAAF Boeing B-29 Superfortress squadron of bombers flies from their base in the Marianas on their mission to attack a target in Japan. Although the target will be invisible due to overcast conditions, the mission will continue as a high-altitude bombing raid.

After six hours of flight time, the radar operator (Clayton Moore) is able to identify the islands that lie off the coast of Honshu. Directions from the radar operator to the bombardier help guide the B-29 to its ultimate target. The pilot is also given discrete flight adjustments to fly directly to the objective.

After arriving above the target at 23,000 ft altitude, although obscured by a thick cloud cover, the bombardier uses the Norden bombsight to aim, before releasing the bomb load. The attack is successful with widespread destruction of the Kiyoshi aircraft plant located north of Tokyo.

== Cast ==
- Arthur Kennedy as Air force narrator (Uncredited)
- Clayton Moore as B-29 radar operator (Uncredited)

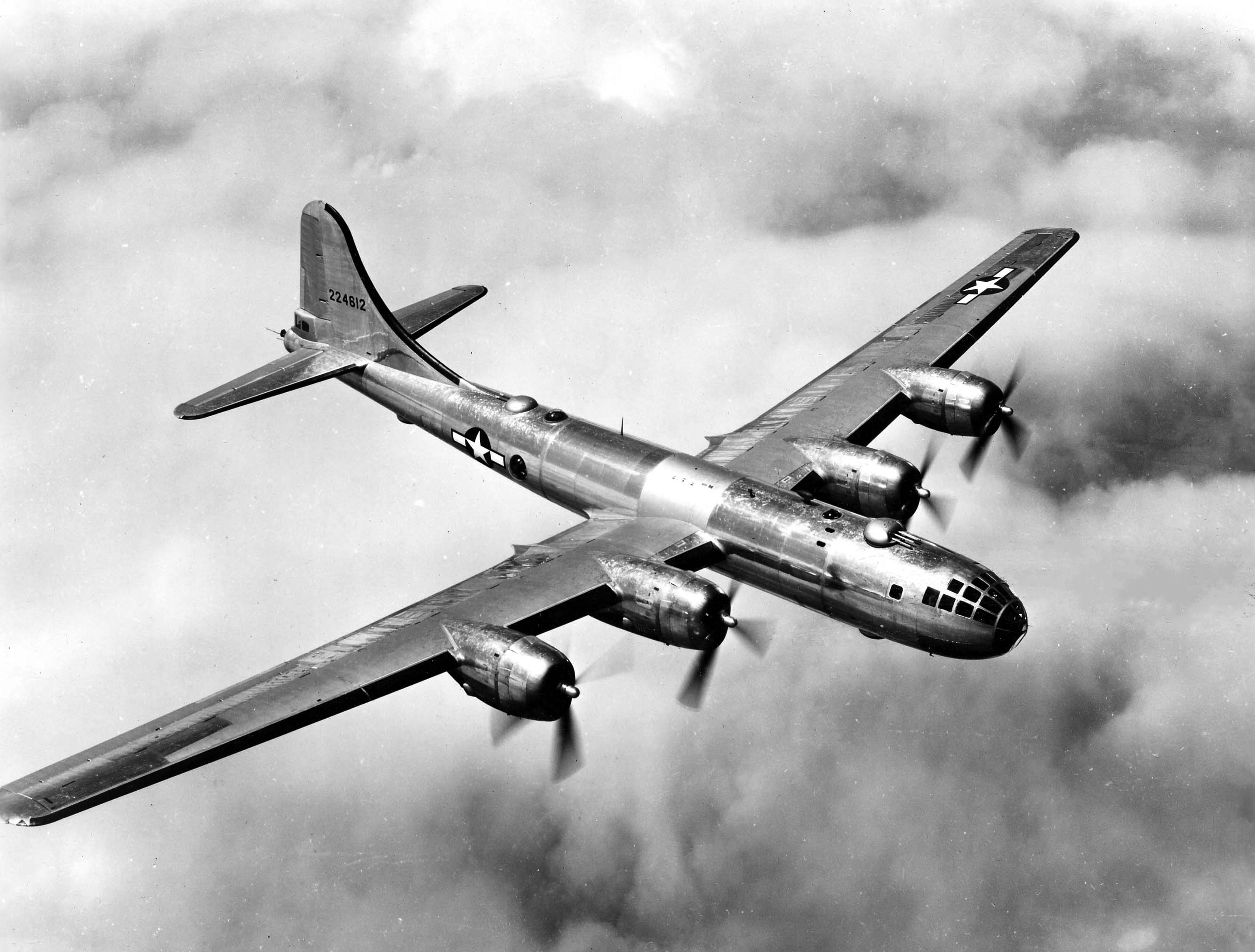
Boeing B-29 Superfortress

== Production ==
Target-Invisible was produced for the Motion Pictures and Special Events Division of the War Finance Division, U.S. Treasury Department. The short has an orchestral score, and has a combination of live-action shot in the Culver City, California studios and stock combat footage of B-29s.

== Intended Purpose and Audience ==
Target-Invisible was typical of the films of the period produced under the auspices of the Office of War Information. In the closing minute, the narrator states that the movie's purpose is to encourage the post-WWII public to buy bonds so that scientists can continue to develop inventions like radar for the security of the nation at peace.

== See also ==
- List of Allied Propaganda Films of World War 2
