= The Lone Ranger and the Lost City of Gold =

1958 film by Lesley Selander

- Theatrical release poster
- Directed by: Lesley Selander
- Written by: Robert Schaefer and Eric Freiwald
- Produced by: Sherman A. Harris
- Starring: Clayton Moore; Jay Silverheels
- Cinematography: Kenneth Peach A.S.C.
- Edited by: Robert S. Golden, A.C.E.
- Music by: Les Baxter; Song "Hi Yo Silver" by Lenny Adelson – Les Baxter
- Color process: Eastmancolor
- Production company: A Jack Wrather Production
- Distributed by: United Artists
- Release date: June 4, 1958
- Running time: 81 minutes
- Country: United States
- Language: English

The Lone Ranger and the Lost City of Gold is a 1958 American Western film in Eastmancolor released by United Artists. The second of two theatrical features specifically based on and continuing the TV show The Lone Ranger it stars Clayton Moore and Jay Silverheels, reprising their roles from the TV series. The first feature film was 1956's The Lone Ranger. No further films based on this specific version of the characters were made after this one.

== Plot ==
Three Indians were brutally murdered by a gang of hooded outlaws. Each one possessed a silver medallion, which were sections cut off from a large silver plaque which served as a treasure map to a secret location where a large amount of gold is reputedly stashed. Two more medallions are unaccounted for, and The Lone Ranger (Clayton Moore) and his friend Tonto (Jay Silverheels) must use all their resources to intercept the gang, prevent further carnage and save the owners of the medallions.

== Cast ==
- Clayton Moore as The Lone Ranger, also known as Bret Reagan
- Jay Silverheels as Tonto
- Douglas Kennedy as Ross Brady
- Charles Watts as Sheriff Oscar
- Noreen Nash as Mrs. Frances Henderson
- Ralph Moody as Padre Esteban
- Lisa Montell as Paviva
- John Miljan as Chief Tomache
- Dean Fredericks (as Norman Fredric) as Dr. James Rolfe
- Maurice Jara as Redbird
- Bill Henry as Travers, Brady's henchman shot by Brady
- Lane Bradford as Brady's henchman shot by the Lone Ranger

== See also ==
- List of American films of 1958
