= Indian Actors Workshop =

Organization for Native American actors

The Indian Actors Workshop was co-founded by Jay Silverheels in the early 1960s at the Los Angeles Indian Centre, with the support of Buffy Sainte-Marie, Iron Eyes Cody, and Rodd Redwing.

The Workshop aimed to promote Native American writing and acting talent in Hollywood, train Native American actors in theatre arts, and advocated a more accurate representation of Native Americans in theatre, television and film. In 1973, Silverheels stated that: "Our No. 1 goal is to tap into the dormant creativity of the Indians."

The Workshop met weekly at venues such as the Los Angeles Indian Center and the Echo Park United Methodist Church. Acting lessons were given by Silverheels, Noble Kid Chissel and William Bassett.

The published short-lived The Indian Actors Workshop Newsletter in 1976 was created by the Northwestern University Theatre in Evanston, Illinois, and reported on the American Theatre Association sessions. It had no relationship to Silverheels' Indian Actors Workshop in Hollywood.
