= The Lone Ranger (TV series) =

American Western television series (1949–1957)

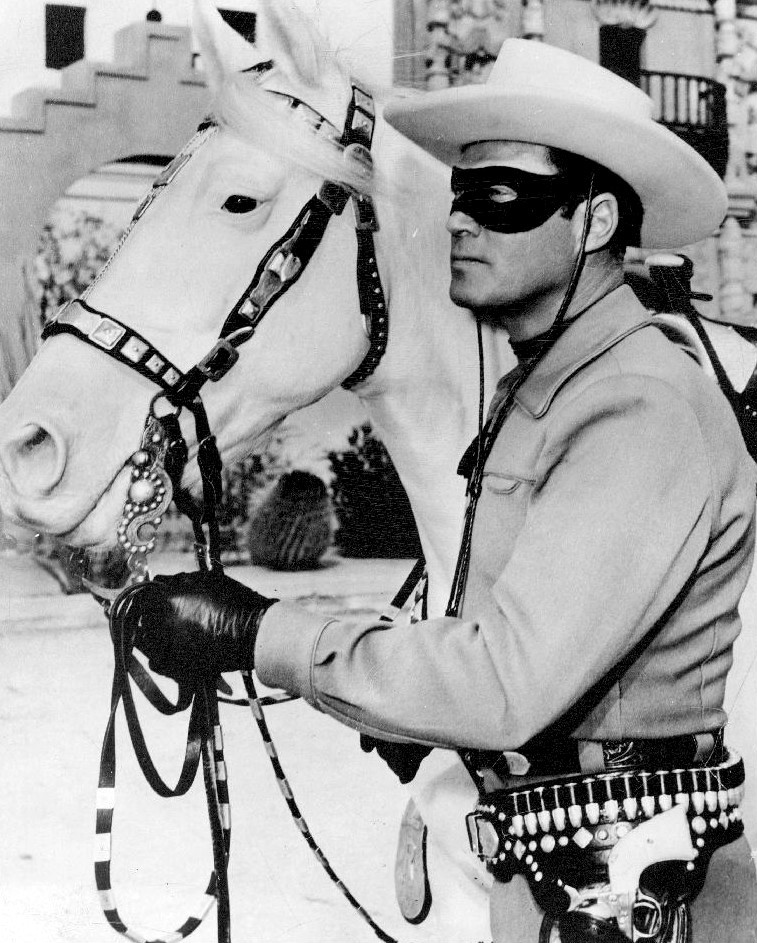
- Clayton Moore as The Lone Ranger
- Created by: George W. Trendle; Fran Striker
- Starring: Clayton Moore; Jay Silverheels; John Hart; Chuck Courtney
- Narrated by: Gerald Mohr; Fred Foy
- Country of origin: United States
- Original language: English
- No. of seasons: 5
- No. of episodes: 221 (list of episodes)

Production
- Running time: 30 minutes
- Production companies: Apex Film; Wrather Productions

Original release
- Network: ABC
- Release: September 15, 1949 – June 6, 1957

The Lone Ranger is an American Western television series that aired on the ABC Television network from 1949 to 1957, with Clayton Moore in the starring role. Jay Silverheels, a member of the Mohawk Aboriginal people in Canada, played the Lone Ranger's Native American companion Tonto.

John Hart replaced Moore in the title role from 1952 to 1953 owing to a contract dispute. Fred Foy, who had been both narrator and announcer of the radio series from 1948 until its ending, was the announcer. Gerald Mohr was originally employed as the narrator for the television series, but story narration was dropped after 16 episodes. The Lone Ranger was the highest-rated television program on ABC in the early 1950s and its first true "hit". The series finished number 7 in the Nielsen ratings for the 1950–1951 season, number 18 for 1951–1952, and number 29 for 1952–1953.

== Series premise ==
A group of six Texas Rangers is ambushed and all are shot, apparently dead. In the hot sun, one lives and crawls to a pool of cool water, which saves his life. He is found by a native American named Tonto, who buries the five other rangers, one of whom is the survivor's brother. Tonto tends to the survivor's health and complies with his wish to make him a mask from his dead brother's vest and to create an empty sixth grave to appear that he too is dead.

The "lone" surviving ranger thereafter disguises himself with the black mask Tonto made and travels with Tonto throughout Texas and the American West to assist those challenged by the lawless elements. In the first episode they are attacked from a hill just after he recovers, and Tonto distracts the attacker from above as the Lone Ranger first shoots the attacker then tries to climb the cliff he is on. The episode ends with him on the cliff but slipping.

A silver mine in the second episode supplies The Lone Ranger with the funds required to finance his wandering lifestyle and the raw material for his signature bullets. Also in Season One, Episode Two, The Lone Ranger and Tonto come upon a prone white horse severely injured by an American bison. The Lone Ranger shoots the buffalo before it can kill the horse. They then attend to the stricken horse. When after some days the horse is healed, the Ranger and Tonto try to decide on a name for the stallion. Tonto says that the steed's coat is "Like a mountain with snow - silver white". The Lone Ranger states that "Silver" will be his name. At the end of most episodes after The Lone Ranger and Tonto leave the scene of the conflict depicted in the story, someone asks the sheriff or other person of authority who the masked man was. The person then responds that it was The Lone Ranger, who is then heard yelling "Hi-Yo Silver, away!" as he and Tonto ride away on their horses at full gallop.

== Production ==
George W. Trendle retained the title of producer, although he recognized that his experience in radio was not adequate for producing the television series. For this, he hired veteran MGM film producer Jack Chertok. Chertok served as the producer for the first 182 episodes.

The first 78 episodes were produced and broadcast for 78 consecutive weeks without any breaks or reruns. Then the entire 78 episodes were shown again before any new episodes were produced. All were shot in Kanab, Utah and California. Much of the series was filmed on the former Iverson Movie Ranch in Chatsworth, California, including the opening sequence to each episode, in which the cry of "Hi-yo Silver" is heard before the Lone Ranger and Silver gallop to a distinctive rock and Silver rears up on his hind legs. The rock seen next to Silver is known as Lone Ranger Rock and remains in place today near the site of the Iverson movie ranch.

When it came time to produce another batch of 52 episodes, there is speculation of a wage dispute with Clayton Moore (although he stated in his autobiography I Was That Masked Man that he never really knew exactly why he was dismissed), and John Hart was hired to play the role of the Lone Ranger. Once again, the 52 new episodes were aired in sequence followed by 52 weeks rerunning them. Despite expectations that the mask would make the switch workable, Hart was not accepted in the role, and his episodes were not seen again until the 1980s.

At the end of the fifth year of the television series, Trendle sold the Lone Ranger rights to Jack Wrather, who bought them on August 3, 1954. Wrather immediately rehired Clayton Moore to play the Lone Ranger, and another 52 episodes were produced. Once again, they were broadcast as a full year of new episodes followed by a full year of reruns.

The final season saw a number of changes, including an episode count of 39, which had become the industry standard. Wrather invested money from his own pocket to film in color, although ABC telecast only in black and white. Wrather also went outdoors for action footage. Otherwise, the series was mostly filmed on a studio sound stage. Another big change, not readily detectable by the viewers, was replacing Jack Chertok with producer Sherman A. Harris. By this time, Chertok had established his own television production company and was busy producing other programs.

Wrather decided not to negotiate further with the network and took the property to the big screen and canceled television production. The last new episode of the color series was broadcast on June 6, 1957, and the series ended September 12, 1957, although ABC reaped the benefits of daytime reruns for several more years. Wrather's company produced two modestly budgeted theatrical features, The Lone Ranger (1956) and The Lone Ranger and the Lost City of Gold (1958). The cast included former child actress Bonita Granville, who had married Wrather after his divorce from a daughter of former Texas Governor W. Lee O'Daniel.

== Episodes ==
Season	Episodes	Originally released	
Season	Episodes	First released	Last released
1	52	September 15, 1949	September 7, 1950
2	26	September 14, 1950	March 8, 1951
3	52	September 11, 1952	September 3, 1953
4	52	September 9, 1954	September 1, 1955
5	39	September 13, 1956	June 6, 1957

== Cast ==
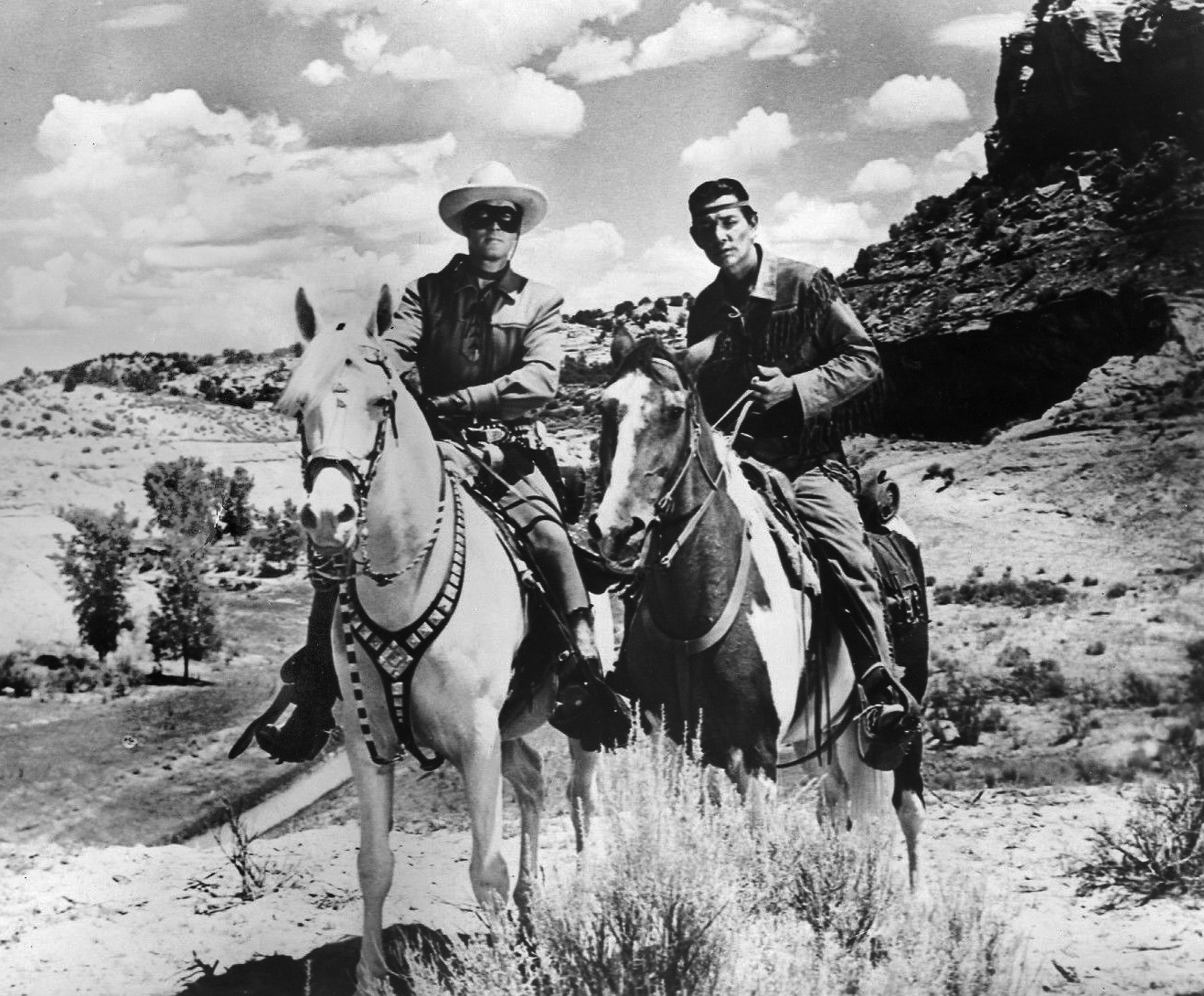
Clayton Moore astride Silver and Jay Silverheels astride Scout in 1956

- Clayton Moore as The Lone Ranger (169 episodes; 1949–1951, 1954–1957)
- John Hart as The Lone Ranger (52 episodes; 1952–1953)
- Jay Silverheels as Tonto (217 episodes; 1949–1957)
- Chuck Courtney as Dan Reid (Lone Ranger's nephew) (14 episodes; 1950–1955)

== Home media ==
In 2003, Rhino Retro Vision, working with Classic Media, released a box set of the first 19 episodes of the 5th season, in color as originally filmed.

On March 31, 2009, Mill Creek Entertainment released the box set Gun Justice featuring The Lone Ranger with other Westerns, including Annie Oakley, The Adventures of Kit Carson, The Cisco Kid, Cowboy G-Men, Judge Roy Bean, The Gabby Hayes Show, and The Roy Rogers Show.

On November 11, 2009, Classic Media released The Lone Ranger: 75th Anniversary Edition to commemorate the show. On June 4, 2013, Classic Media released The Lone Ranger: Collector's Edition, a 30-disc set featuring all 221 episodes of the series on DVD, though many of the episodes are the syndicated edits missing two to three minutes.

== See also ==
There were two animated cartoon series starring the Lone Ranger:

- The Lone Ranger (1966 TV series)
- The Lone Ranger (1980 TV series)
