= Chuck Courtney (actor) =

American actor (1930–2000)

- Born: Charles T. Courtney Jr. July 23, 1930; Los Angeles, California
- Died: January 20, 2000 (aged 69); North Hollywood, Los Angeles, California
- Occupations: Actor, stuntman
- Years active: 1950–1991

Charles T. Courtney Jr. (July 23, 1930 – January 20, 2000) was an American actor and stuntman perhaps best known for his portrayal of Dan Reid, Jr., the Lone Ranger's nephew, in the television version of The Lone Ranger.

Courtney's mother, Elizabeth Courtney, was a costume designer at Columbia.

Courtney first played Reid in The Lone Ranger in 1950. Between then and 1955, he made 13 more appearances in that role. He appeared in films and television series' such as The Virginian, Pet Sematary, The Wild Wild West, Rio Lobo, Wagon Train, The Cowboys, Billy the Kid Versus Dracula, and Star Trek.

Courtney had suffered a series of strokes. On January 20, 2000, Courtney died at his home as the result of a self-inflicted gunshot wound.
