= Jay Silverheels =

Canadian Mohawk actor and athlete (1912–1980)

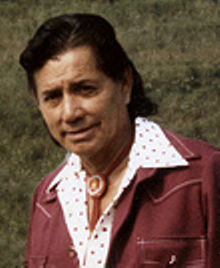
- Silverheels at The Meadows Racetrack in Pennsylvania, 1970s
- Born: Harold Jay Smith; May 26, 1912; Six Nations of the Grand River, Ontario, Canada
- Died: March 5, 1980 (aged 67); Calabasas, California, US
- Occupations: Actor, stunt man, athlete, poet, salesman
- Years active: 1937–1980
- Known for: Tonto
- Television: Tonto in The Lone Ranger (TV series)
- Spouses: Bobbi Smith (m. 19??; div. 1943); Mary Diroma (m. 1945)
- Children: 6

Jay Silverheels (born Harold Jay Smith; May 26, 1912 – March 5, 1980) was a First Nations and Mohawk actor and athlete, descended from three Haudenosaunee nations. He was well known for his role as Tonto, the Native American companion of the Lone Ranger in the American Western television series The Lone Ranger.

== Early life ==
Silverheels was born Harold Jay Smith in Canada, on the Six Nations of the Grand River reserve, near Hagersville, Ontario. He was a grandson of Mohawk Chief A. G. Smith and Mary Wedge, and one of the 11 children of Captain Alexander George Edwin Smith, MC, Cayuga, and his wife Mabel Phoebe Dockstater, maternal Mohawk, and paternal Seneca. His father was wounded and decorated for service at the battles of Somme and Ypres during World War I (Jay would have been four years old at this time), and later was an adjutant training Polish-American recruits for the Blue Army for service in France, at Niagara-on-the-Lake, Ontario.

== Athlete ==
Silverheels excelled in athletics, most notably in lacrosse, before leaving home to travel around North America. In 1931, owners of National Hockey League's franchises in Toronto and Montreal created indoor lacrosse (also known as "box lacrosse") as a means to fill empty arenas during the summers. Playing as "Harry Smith", Silverheels was among the first players chosen to play for the Toronto Tecumsehs. Along with his brothers and cousin, Russell (Beef), Sid (Porky), and George (Chubby), he also played on teams in Buffalo, Rochester, Atlantic City, and Akron throughout the 1930s on teams in the North American Amateur Lacrosse Association. He lived for a time in Buffalo, New York. In 1938, he placed second in the middleweight class of the Golden Gloves tournament held at Madison Square Garden in New York City. Silverheels was inducted into the Canadian Lacrosse Hall of Fame as a veteran player in 1997.

== Actor ==
=== Films ===
While playing in Los Angeles on a touring box lacrosse team in 1937, Silverheels impressed Joe E. Brown with his athleticism. Brown encouraged him to do a screen test, which led to his acting career. Silverheels began working in motion pictures as an extra and stuntman in 1937. He was billed variously as Harold Smith and Harry Smith, and appeared in low-budget features, Westerns, and serials.

He adopted his screen name from the nickname he had as a lacrosse player. Jay Silverheels was cast in a short feature film, I Am an American (1944). (Note: The 16 minute film, I Am an American, was featured in American theaters in connection with "I Am an American Day" (now called Constitution Day). It was produced by Gordon Hollingshead, written and directed by Crane Wilbur, and featured Humphrey Bogart, Gary Gray, Gordon Hart, Dick Haymes, Danny Kaye, Joan Leslie, Mary Lee Moody, Dennis Morgan, Knute Rockne, and Jay Silverheels. See: I Am An American at the TCM Movie Database (archived).) From the late 1940s, he played in major films, including Captain from Castile starring Tyrone Power (1947), Key Largo with Humphrey Bogart (1948), Lust for Gold with Glenn Ford (1949), Broken Arrow (1950) with James Stewart, War Arrow (1953) with Maureen O'Hara, Jeff Chandler and Noah Beery Jr., The Black Dakotas (1954) as Black Buffalo, Drums Across the River (1954), Walk the Proud Land (1956) with Audie Murphy and Anne Bancroft, Alias Jesse James (1959) with Bob Hope, and Indian Paint (1964) with Johnny Crawford. He made a brief appearance in True Grit (1969) as a condemned criminal about to be executed. He played a substantial role as John Crow in Santee (1973), starring Glenn Ford. One of his last roles was a wise, white-haired chief in The Man Who Loved Cat Dancing (1973).

=== Television ===
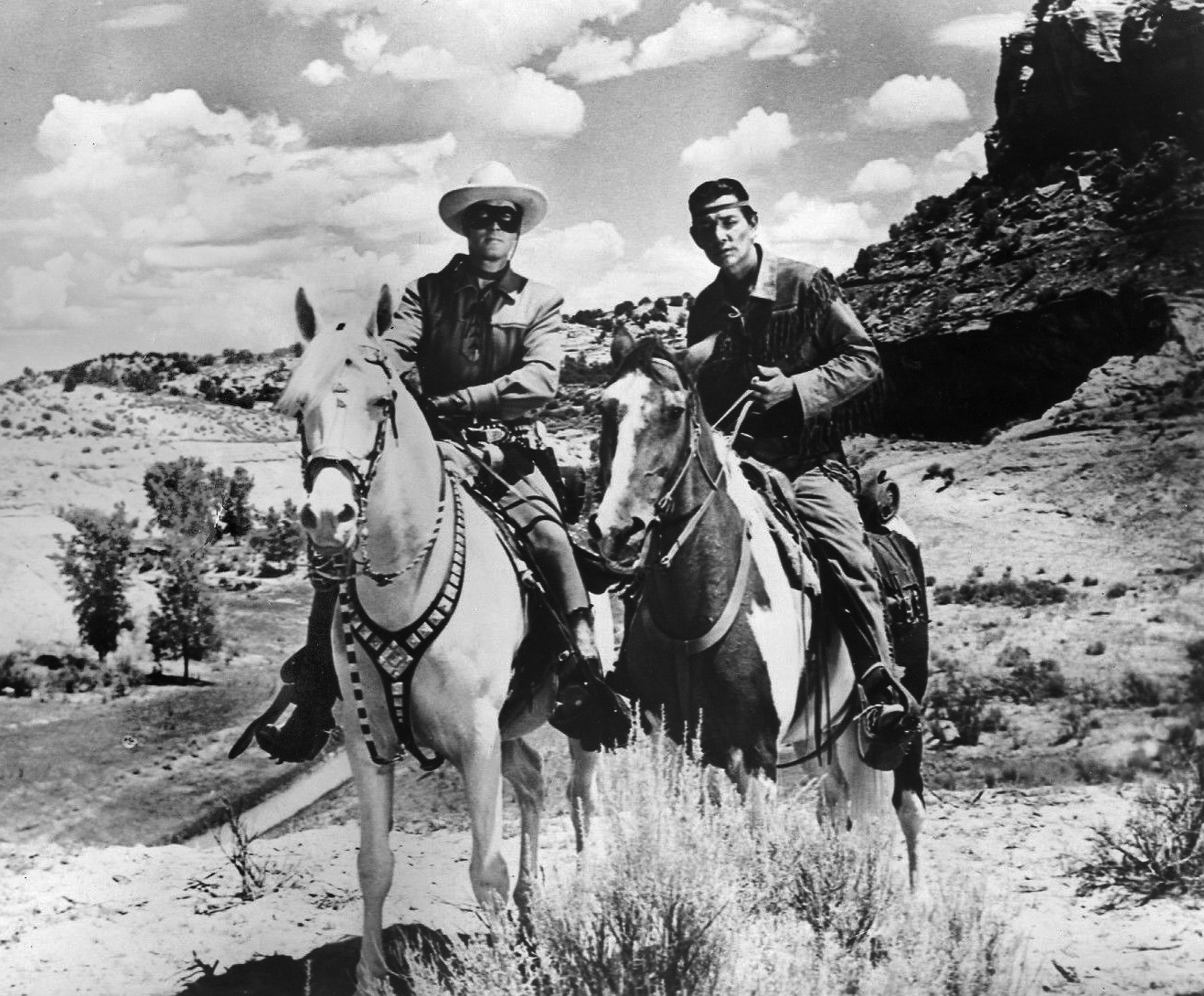
Clayton Moore as the Lone Ranger and Jay Silverheels as Tonto: Moore is riding Silver, while Silverheels is riding Scout.

Jay Silverheels achieved his greatest fame as Tonto on The Lone Ranger TV series (1949–1957). Silverheels appeared in the film sequels: The Lone Ranger (1956) and The Lone Ranger and the Lost City of Gold (1958).

When The Lone Ranger television series ended, Silverheels continued to be typecast as a Native American. On January 6, 1960, he portrayed a Native American firefighter trying to extinguish a forest fire in the episode "Leap of Life" in the syndicated series, Rescue 8, starring Jim Davis and fellow Canadian Lang Jeffries.

Silverheels appeared in an episode of the TV series Love, American Style. The segment, "Love and the Test of Manhood", first aired on February 11, 1972.

Eventually, he went to work as a salesman to supplement his acting income. He also began to publish poetry inspired by his youth on the Six Nations Indian Reserve and recited his work on television. In 1966, he guest-starred as John Tallgrass in the short-lived ABC comedy/Western series The Rounders, with Ron Hayes, Patrick Wayne, and Chill Wills.

Despite the typecasting, Silverheels in later years often poked fun at his character. In 1969, he appeared as Tonto without the Lone Ranger in a comedy sketch on The Tonight Show Starring Johnny Carson. The sketch was featured on the 1974 record album Here's Johnny: Magic Moments from the Tonight Show. "My name is Tonto. I hail from Toronto and I speak Esperanto." In 1970, he appeared in a commercial for Chevrolet as a Native American chief who rescues two lost hunters, who had ignored his advice, in that year's Chevy Blazer. The William Tell Overture is heard in the background.

Silverheels spoofed his Tonto character, opposite Clayton Moore, in a Stan Freberg Jeno's Pizza Rolls TV commercial, which was set to the music of the William Tell Overture, and in The Phynx opposite John Hart, who also played the Lone Ranger in the original television series.

He appeared in three 1964/5 episodes of NBC's Daniel Boone, starring Fess Parker in the title role.

His later appearances included an episode of ABC's The Brady Bunch, as a Native American who befriends the Bradys in the Grand Canyon, and in an episode of the short-lived Dusty's Trail, starring Bob Denver of Gilligan's Island.

In the early 1960s, Silverheels supported the Indian Actors Workshop, where Native American actors refined their skills in Echo Park, Los Angeles. Today, the workshop is firmly established.

== Personal life ==
Silverheels raised, bred, and raced Standardbred horses in his spare time. Once, when asked about possibly running Tonto's paint horse Scout in a race, Jay laughed off the idea: "Heck, I can outrun Scout!"

Married twice, Silverheels had two sons (Steve, with his first wife; Jay Anthony Jr., who followed his father into acting) and four daughters (Marilyn, Gail, Pamela, and Karen).

== Death ==
Silverheels suffered a stroke in 1976, and the following year, Clayton Moore – his co-star on The Lone Ranger – rode an American Paint Horse in Silverheels's honor in the Pasadena Tournament of Roses Parade. Silverheels died on March 5, 1980, from a stroke, at age 67, in Calabasas, California. He was cremated at Chapel of the Pines Crematory, and his ashes were returned to the Six Nations Reserve in Ontario. His cenotaph sits at Forest Lawn Memorial Park (Glendale) in Glendale, California.

== Legacy ==
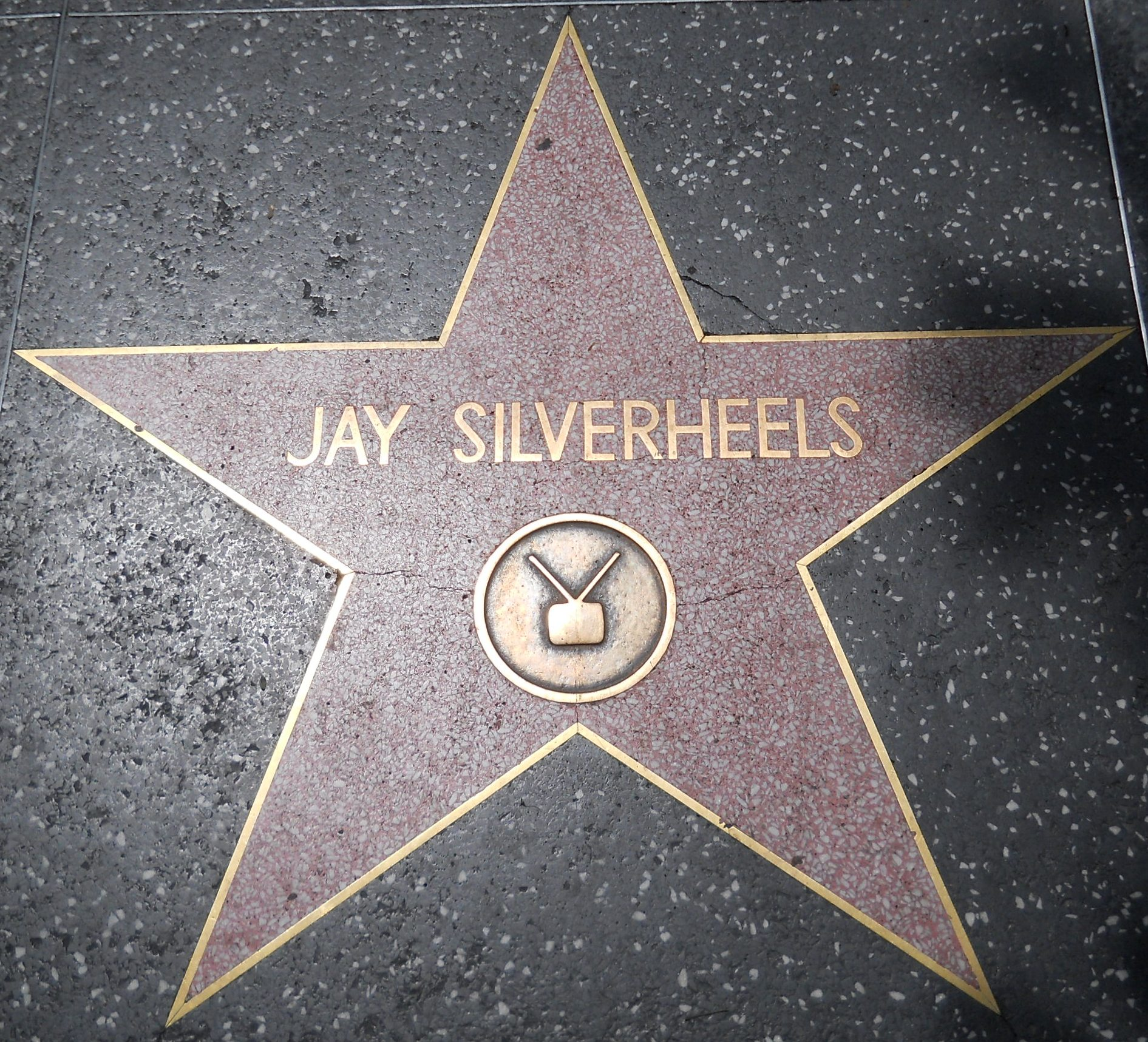
Star on Hollywood Walk of Fame, 6538 Hollywood Blvd

In 1993, Silverheels was inducted into the Hall of Great Western Performers at the National Cowboy & Western Heritage Museum in Oklahoma City, Oklahoma. He was named to the Western New York Entertainment Hall of Fame, and his portrait hangs in Shea's Performing Arts Center in Buffalo, New York. He has a star on the Hollywood Walk of Fame at 6538 Hollywood Boulevard, awarded on July 17, 1979. First Americans in the Arts honored Silverheels with their Life Achievement Award.

In 1997, Silverheels was inducted, under the name Harry "Tonto" Smith, into the Canadian Lacrosse Hall of Fame in the Veteran Player category in recognition of his lacrosse career during the 1930s.

A fictionalized version of Silverheels appears in the Thrilling Adventure Hour serialized segment "Tales from the Black Lagoon".

His friend Milan Smith, a trainer and racehorse owner, promised that he would name a horse after Silverheels. He named a pacer "Hi Ho Silverheels".

== Selected filmography ==
- Make a Wish (1937) – Indian Guide (uncredited)
- The Sea Hawk (1940) – Native Lookout (uncredited)
- Kit Carson (1940) – Indian (uncredited)
- Too Many Girls (1940) – Indian (uncredited)
- Hudson's Bay (1941) – Indian (uncredited)
- Western Union (1941) – Indian (uncredited)
- Jungle Girl (1941, Serial) – Lion Man Guard [Chs. 2–3, 15] (uncredited)
- This Woman Is Mine (1941) – Indian Marauder (uncredited)
- Valley of the Sun (1942) – Indian (uncredited)
- Perils of Nyoka (1942, Serial) – Tuareg (uncredited)
- Good Morning, Judge (1943) – Indian (uncredited)
- Daredevils of the West (1943, Serial) – Kiaga [Ch. 8–9] (uncredited)
- The Girl from Monterrey (1943) – Fighter Tito Flores
- Northern Pursuit (1943) – Indian (uncredited)
- The Phantom (1943, Serial) – Astari Warrior (uncredited)
- Passage to Marseille (1944) – Sailor Crewman on Boat Deck (uncredited)
- The Tiger Woman (1944, Serial) – Native at Shack Shoot-Out [Ch. 7] (uncredited)
- Call of the Jungle (1944) – Native (uncredited)
- Haunted Harbor (1944, Serial) – Native [Chs. 11–12] (uncredited)
- Lost in a Harem (1944) – Guard at Execution (uncredited)
- Tahiti Nights (1944) – Lua (uncredited)
- Song of the Sarong (1945) – Spearman (uncredited)
- Romance of the West (1946) – Young Bear (uncredited)
- Singin' in the Corn (1946) – Indian Brave
- Gas House Kids Go West (1947) – Kingsley's Henchman (uncredited)
- Northwest Outpost (1947) – Indian Scout (uncredited)
- Unconquered (1947) – Indian (uncredited)
- The Last Round-up (1947) – Sam Luther (uncredited)
- The Prairie (1947) – Running Deer
- Captain from Castile (1947) – Coatl (uncredited)
- The Treasure of the Sierra Madre (1948) – Indian Guide at Pier (uncredited)
- Fury at Furnace Creek (1948) – Little Dog (uncredited)
- Key Largo (1948) – Tom Osceola (uncredited)
- Singin' Spurs (1948) – Abel
- Family Honeymoon (1948) – Elevator Boy (uncredited)
- The Feathered Serpent (1948) – Diego (uncredited)
- Yellow Sky (1948) – Indian (uncredited)
- Song of India (1949) – Villager (uncredited)
- Tulsa (1949) – Creek Indian (uncredited)
- Laramie (1949) – Running Wolf (uncredited)
- Lust for Gold (1949) – Deputy Walter (uncredited)
- Trail of the Yukon (1949) – Poleon
- Sand (1949) – Indian (uncredited)
- The Cowboy and the Indians (1949) – Lakoma
- Broken Arrow (1950) – Geronimo (uncredited)
- The Wild Blue Yonder (1951) – Benders
- Red Mountain (1951) – Little Crow
- The Battle at Apache Pass (1952) – Geronimo
- The Half-Breed (1952) – Apache (uncredited)
- Brave Warrior (1952) – Tecumseh
- The Story of Will Rogers (1952) – Joe Arrow (uncredited)
- Yankee Buccaneer (1952) – Lead Warrior
- The Pathfinder (1952) – Chingachgook
- The Legend of the Lone Ranger (1952) – Tonto
- Last of the Comanches (1953) – Indian (uncredited)
- Jack McCall, Desperado (1953) – Red Cloud
- The Nebraskan (1953) – Spotted Bear
- War Arrow (1953) – Satanta
- Saskatchewan (1954) (with Alan Ladd) – Cajou
- Drums Across The River (1954) (with Audie Murphy) – Taos
- The Black Dakotas (1954) – Black Buffalo
- Four Guns to the Border (1954) – Yaqui
- Masterson of Kansas (1954) – Yellow Hawk
- The Lone Ranger Rides Again (1955, TV Movie) – Tonto
- The Lone Ranger Story (1955) – Tonto
- The Vanishing American (1955) – Beeteia
- The Lone Ranger (1956) – Tonto
- Walk the Proud Land (1956) – Geronimo
- Return to Warbow (1958) – Indian Joe
- The Lone Ranger and the Lost City of Gold (1958) – Tonto
- Alias Jesse James (1959) – Tonto (uncredited)
- Indian Paint (1965) – Chief Hevatanu
- Smith! (1969) – McDonald Lasheway
- True Grit (1969) – Condemned Man at Hanging (uncredited)
- The Phynx (1970) – Tonto
- In Pursuit of Treasure (1972)
- One Little Indian (1973) – Jimmy Wolf
- The Man Who Loved Cat Dancing (1973) – The Chief
- Santee (1973) – John Crow

== Television ==
- The Lone Ranger, 217 episodes (1949–1957) – Tonto
- Wide Wide World, episode "The Western" (1958) – Himself
- Wanted Dead or Alive, S2/E14 "Man on Horseback" (1959) – Charley Red Cloud
- Walt Disney Presents: Texas John Slaughter, episode "Apache Friendship & Texas John Slaughter: Geronimo's Revenge" (1960) – Natchez
- Gunslinger, episode "The Recruit" (1961) – Hopi Indian
- Wagon Train, episode "Path of the Serpent" (1961) – The Serpent
- Rawhide, episode "The Gentleman's Gentleman" (1961) – Pawnee Joe
- Laramie, episode "The Day of the Savage" (1962) – Toma
- Daniel Boone, S1/E11 "Mountain of the Dead" (1964) – Chenrogan
- Daniel Boone, S1/E20 "The Quietists" (1965) – Latawa
- Branded, episode "The Test" (1965) – Wild Horse
- Daniel Boone, S2/E14 "The Christmas Story" (1965) – Sashona
- Gentle Ben, episode "Invasion of Willie Sam Gopher" (1967) – Willie Sam Gopher
- The Virginian, episode "The Heritage" (1968) – Den'Gwatzi
- The Brady Bunch, episode "The Brady Braves" (1971) – Chief Eagle Cloud
- The Virginian, episode "The Animal" (1971) – Spotted Hand
- Cannon, episode "Valley of the Damned" (1973) – Jimmy One Eye

== See also ==
- Canadian pioneers in early Hollywood
