= Clayton Moore =

American actor (1914–1999)

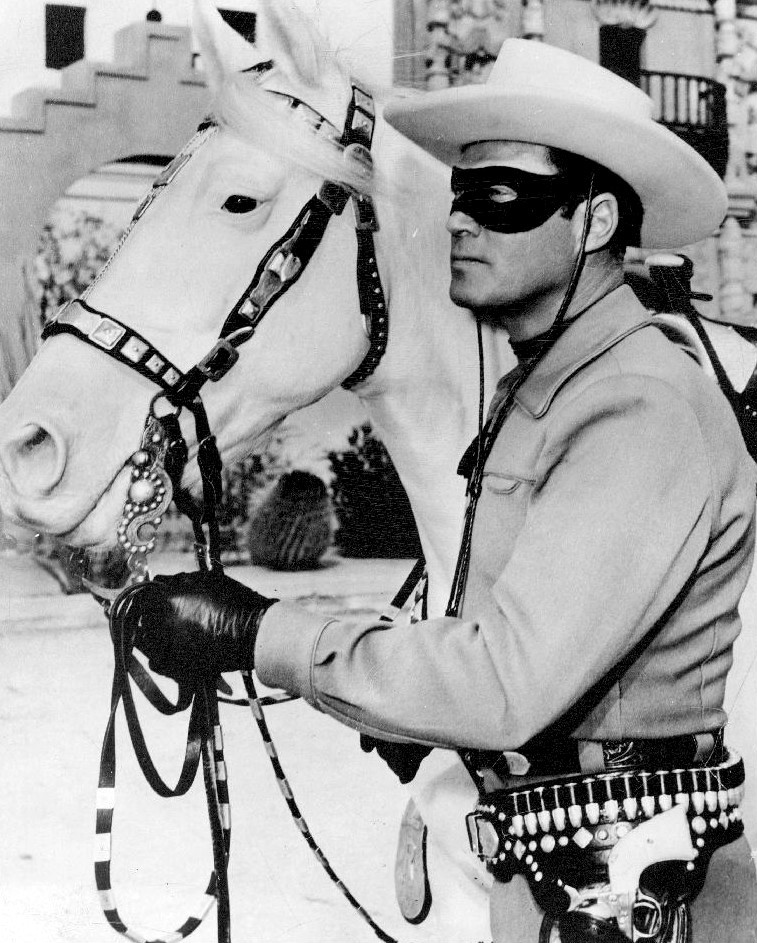
- Moore as the Lone Ranger
- Born: Jack Carlton Moore; September 14, 1914; Chicago, Illinois, U.S.
- Died: December 28, 1999 (aged 85); Los Angeles, California, U.S.
- Resting place: Forest Lawn Memorial Park in Glendale, California
- Other names: Jack Moore; Clay Moore
- Occupations: Actor, model
- Years active: 1934–1999
- Known for: The Lone Ranger
- Television: The Lone Ranger
- Spouses: Mary Francis (m. 1940; div. 1942); Sally Angela Allen (m. 1943; died 1986); Connie Moore (m. 1986; div. 1989); Clarita Petrone (m. 1992)
- Children: 1

Clayton Moore (born Jack Carlton Moore, September 14, 1914 – December 28, 1999) was an American actor best known for playing the fictional Western character the Lone Ranger from September 1949 to September 1952 and then again from September 1954 to September 1957 on the television series of the same name and two related films from the same producers.

== Early life ==
Born in Chicago, Illinois, on September 14, 1914, Jack Carlton Moore was the youngest of three sons of Theresa Violet (née Fisher, 1883–1968) and Charles Sprague Moore (1882–1944). Moore's father, according to the federal census of 1930, was a native of New York and supported his family in Chicago by working as a real estate broker. That same census also documents that a full-time maid, Amelia Hirsch, lived with the Moore family, an indication of the household's relative prosperity at the time.

Highly athletic as a boy, Jack became a circus acrobat by age eight, and later in 1934, he appeared at the Century of Progress Exposition in Chicago with a trapeze act. He graduated from Stephen K. Hayt Elementary School, Sullivan Junior High School, and Senn High School on the far North Side of Chicago.

== Career ==
=== Modelling and acting ===
Moore as a young man worked successfully as a John Robert Powers model. Moving to Hollywood in the late 1930s, he worked as a stuntman and bit player between modelling jobs. Moore, in his 1996 autobiography I Was That Masked Man, noted that Hollywood producer Edward Small persuaded him around 1940 to adopt the stage name "Clayton". Subsequently, he was cast as an occasional player in B Westerns and the lead in four Republic Studio cliffhangers, including Ghost of Zorro (in which his character wore a black mask) and in two films for Columbia Pictures.

=== Military service ===
During World War II, Moore enlisted in the U.S. Army Air Forces and served with that branch's First Motion Picture Unit making training films, such as Target-Invisible, in which Moore co-starred with fellow actor Arthur Kennedy.

=== The Lone Ranger ===
In 1949, Moore's work on the Ghost of Zorro serial drew the attention of George W. Trendle, co-creator and producer of a popular radio series titled The Lone Ranger. The series' running plot involved the exploits of a mysterious former Texas Ranger, the sole survivor of a Ranger posse ambushed by a gang of outlaws, who roamed the West with his Indian companion Tonto to battle evil and help the downtrodden. When Trendle brought the radio program to television, Moore landed the title role. With the "March of the Swiss Soldiers" finale from Rossini's William Tell overture as their theme music, Moore and co-star Jay Silverheels made history as the stars of the first Western written specifically for television. The Lone Ranger soon became the highest-rated program to that point on the fledgling ABC network and its first true hit. It earned an Emmy Award nomination in 1950.

Moore was replaced in the third season by John Hart, reportedly due to a contract dispute, but he returned for the final two seasons. Moore later said he received no explanation from the producers as to why he was replaced or why he was rehired. The fourth season of The Lone Ranger was again filmed in black and white; however, the fifth and final season of the series was the only one to be shot in color. In all, Moore starred in 169 of the 221 episodes produced.

Moore appeared in other television series during his Lone Ranger run, including a 1952 episode of Bill Williams' syndicated Western The Adventures of Kit Carson. He guest-starred in two episodes of Jock Mahoney's series The Range Rider in 1952 and 1953. Silverheels and he also starred in two feature-length Lone Ranger motion pictures. After completion of the second feature, The Lone Ranger and the Lost City of Gold in 1958, Moore began 40 years of personal appearances (including at several short-lived Lone Ranger Restaurants in Southern California), TV guest spots, and classic commercials as the legendary masked man. Silverheels joined him for occasional reunions during the early 1960s. Throughout his career, Moore expressed respect and love for Silverheels.

One of Moore's personal appearances in character became the basis of a story that actor Jay Thomas told every year around Christmas beginning in 2000 on The Late Show with David Letterman. Thomas was a radio disc jockey at the time in North Carolina and happened to be doing a show at a car dealership where Moore was appearing in character as The Lone Ranger. Moore had been stranded at the dealership, and Thomas offered him a ride back to his hotel. On the way, a passing motorist struck Thomas' Volvo with enough force to break a headlight. Thomas gave chase and eventually cornered the man in a parking lot where he threatened to press charges. The driver of the other car taunted Thomas by saying nobody would believe his story, but Moore emerged from the back seat of the car — still wearing his costume — and said "they'll believe me, citizen" to the stunned driver. With one exception, Thomas returned to Letterman's show to tell the story every December until Letterman's retirement.

==== Lawsuit ====
In 1979, Jack Wrather, who owned the Lone Ranger character, obtained a court order prohibiting Moore from making future appearances as The Lone Ranger. Wrather was in the process of making a new film version of the story and believed that Moore's public appearances in character would undercut the value of the character and the film and to dispel any rumors that the 65-year-old Moore would be playing the title role in the new picture.

Wrather's move was disastrous. Moore responded by filing a countersuit and then slightly changed his costume, replacing the domino mask with a pair of Foster Grant wraparound sunglasses and participating in the company's "Who's that behind those Foster Grants?" ad campaign. The public was strongly in favor of Moore, as evidenced when moviegoers stayed away from Wrather's film. The Legend of the Lone Ranger was released in 1981, was panned by critics, and earned only $12 million at the box office, two-thirds of the film's budget. The legal proceedings between Moore and Wrather dragged on until 1984, when Wrather suddenly dropped the lawsuit permitting Moore again to make public appearances as the Lone Ranger; Wrather died of cancer two months after dropping the suit.

==== Moore & the Lone Ranger ====
Moore was often quoted as saying he had "fallen in love with the Lone Ranger character" and strove in his personal life to take The Lone Ranger Creed to heart. Coupled with his public fight to retain the right to wear the mask, Moore and his character became inseparable. Moore was so identified with the masked man that he is the only person (as of 2006) that has his character's name along with his own in the star on the Hollywood Walk of Fame. It reads: "Clayton Moore — The Lone Ranger". He was inducted into the Stuntman's Hall of Fame in 1982 and in 1990 into the Western Performers Hall of Fame at the National Cowboy & Western Heritage Museum in Oklahoma City, Oklahoma. Moore was also awarded a place on the Western Walk of Fame in Old Town Newhall, California.

== Later life and death ==
In 1964 Moore moved to Golden Valley, Minnesota, with his wife and daughter to be closer to his wife's family in Minneapolis. He obtained a Minnesota real estate license, established Ranger Realty, and helped to develop the area that is now north of Interstate 394 near the Louisiana Avenue exit. During that time, Moore once came upon the scene of a crime and untied a grocery store manager shortly after the store had been robbed, apparently quipping: "You have just been rescued by the Lone Ranger." At the end of his life he was married to Clarita Moore (née Petrone); he also had an adopted daughter.

Moore died on December 28, 1999 at the age of 85 at West Hills Hospital in Los Angeles after suffering a heart attack at his home in nearby Calabasas. He is buried at Forest Lawn Memorial Park, Glendale.

== Filmography ==
Film
Year	Title	Role	Note
1937	Forlorn River	Cowboy	uncredited
1937	Thunder Trail	Cowboy	uncredited
1938	Go Chase Yourself	Reporter	uncredited
1939	Burn 'Em Up O'Connor	Hospital Intern	as Jack Moore
1940	Kit Carson	Paul Terry	
1940	The Son of Monte Cristo	Lieutenant Fritz Dorner	
1941	International Lady	Sewell	
1941	Tuxedo Junction	Bill Bennett	
1942	Black Dragons	FBI Agent Richard 'Dick' Martin	
1942	Perils of Nyoka	Dr. Larry Grayson	
1942	Outlaws of Pine Ridge	Lane Hollister	
1946	The Bachelor's Daughters	Bill Cotter	
1946	The Crimson Ghost	Ashe	
1947	Jesse James Rides Again	Jesse James	
1947	Along the Oregon Trail	Gregg Thurston	
1948	G-Men Never Forget	Agent Ted O'Hara	
1948	Marshal of Amarillo	Art Crandall	
1948	Adventures of Frank and Jesse James	Jesse James	
1949	The Far Frontier	Tom Sharper	
1949	Sheriff of Wichita	Raymond D'Arcy	
1949	Riders of the Whistling Pines	Henchman Pete	
1949	Ghost of Zorro	Ken Mason/ el Zorro	
1949	Frontier Investigator	Scott Garnett	
1949	The Gay Amigo (The Cisco Kid)	Lieutenant	
1949	South of Death Valley	Brad	
1949	Masked Raiders	Matt Trevett	
1949	The Cowboy and the Indians	Henchman Luke	
1949	Bandits of El Dorado	B.F. Morgan	
1949	Sons of New Mexico	Rufe Burns	
1949-1957	The Lone Ranger	The Lone Ranger	(TV series) 169 episodes
1951	Cyclone Fury	Grat Hanlon	
1951	Kansas Pacific	Stone	
1952	Son of Geronimo: Apache Avenger	Jim Scott	as Clay Moore
1952	The Hawk of Wild River	The Hawk	
1952	Radar Men from the Moon	Graber	
1952	Night Stage to Galveston	Clyde Chambers	
1952	Captive of Billy the Kid	Paul Howard	
1952	Buffalo Bill in Tomahawk Territory	Buffalo Bill	
1952	Montana Territory	Deputy George Ives	
1953	Jungle Drums of Africa	Alan King	as Clay Moore
1953	Kansas Pacific	Henchman Stone	
1953	The Bandits of Corsica	Ricardo	
1953	Down Laredo Way	Chip Wells	
1954	Gunfighters of the Northwest	Bram Nevin	
1955	Apache Ambush	Townsman	
1956	The Lone Ranger	The Lone Ranger	(1956 film)
1958	The Lone Ranger and the Lost City of Gold	The Lone Ranger	(1958 film)
1959	Lassie	The Lone Ranger	(TV series) Guest star

== Autobiography ==
- I Was That Masked Man, by Clayton Moore with Frank Thompson, Taylor Publishing Company, 1996 – ISBN 0-87833-939-6
