= Benzin (disambiguation) =

Benzin may refer to:

- "Benzin", a German-language song by Rammstein
- Benzin (film), 2017 Bulgarian film
- Benzin (opera), 1929 German-language opera
- Bięcino (German name Benzin), village in the administrative district of Gmina Damnica

== See also ==
- Benzoin (disambiguation)
