= False titles of nobility =

Fabricated titles of social rank

False titles of nobility or royal title scams are claimed titles of social rank that have been fabricated or assumed by an individual or family without recognition by the authorities of a country in which titles of nobility exist or once existed. They have received an increasing amount of press attention, as more schemes that purport to confer or sell such honorifics are promoted on the internet. Concern about the use of titles which lack legal standing or a basis in tradition has prompted increased vigilance and denunciation, although under English common law a person may choose to be known by any name they see fit as long as it is not done to "commit fraud or evade an obligation".

== Self-styled titles ==
Outside monarchies, a distinction is drawn between a legitimate historical title which may no longer be recognised by a successor state (such as a republic) but is borne or claimed by a hereditary heir, and an invented or falsely-attributed noble title that is claimed without any historical basis.

Self-assumption of a title is not necessarily illegal; it depends on the law of the place where the title is used. The bearers of some self-assumed titles do not claim that such titles have been recognized by any nation at any time. Where such titles have existed historically, the current bearer may make no claim that its use is pursuant to a hereditary grant to an ancestor by a fount of honor.

Some individuals, associations or corporations purport to grant or transmit a legal or official right to a title, honour, acknowledgement or membership in a self-styled order of chivalry simply in exchange for a payment.

== British titles ==
The British peerage includes the titles of (in ascending order) baron, viscount, earl, marquess and duke. All of these titleholders, except dukes, are (if male) known by the honorific "Lord" (in Scotland the lowest rank in the peerage is "Lord (of Parliament)" rather than "Baron"). No peerage can be created by monetary means; such a transaction would be in breach of the Honours (Prevention of Abuses) Act 1925. The British embassy in the United States informs that "the sale of British titles is prohibited".

Titles in the Scottish baronage are arguably the only British nobility titles that may be passed to any person, of either sex, by inheritance or conveyance.

Baronetcies are hereditary titles granted by the Crown, but are not part of the peerage. Baronets are styled "Sir" with the word "Baronet" (or the suffix "Bt." or "Bart.") after their surname. New baronetcies cannot be purchased, and existing ones cannot be bought or sold.

Persons who have been enrolled at higher levels in orders of chivalry are usually knights and (female equivalent) dames, and are thus entitled to the prefixes "Sir" and "Dame", respectively. These titles cannot be bought or sold, either.

The holder of a peerage, baronetcy or knighthood may not lawfully transfer those titles or any title associated with them to another individual. If a peerage is renounced, it devolves automatically upon the heir-at-law, usually by primogeniture, but in some cases by a special remainder. The incumbent has no right to designate a successor to the title.

=== Laird ===
Several websites and Internet vendors on websites such as eBay and Established Titles sell Scottish lairdships along with small plots of land, known as souvenir plots. However, they create no legal right of ownership or legal right of heraldry in Scots law.

The Court of the Lord Lyon (the heraldic court tasked with the award and regulation of heraldry) considers souvenir plot titles to be meaningless as the registration of numerous "lairds" of a single estate would pose too great an administrative burden. The opinion of the Lord Lyon has been criticised as the UK government allows the usage of Manorial Titles in British passports of the form: "THE HOLDER IS THE LORD OF THE MANOR/LAIRD OF [X]" (brackets added). However, as a matter of Scots property law, souvenir plots cannot competently create a real right of ownership in Scots law. The Land Registration (Scotland) Act 2012 forbids the registration of deeds relating to souvenir plots in the Land Register of Scotland. This means that the Buyer obtains no legal right of or to ownership of the souvenir plot in any event, so the evidence threshold required by HM Passport Office to use the Manorial Title will be unlikely to be met. Evidence of ownership of property would typically be the production of a Title Sheet to the property or a formal and valid disposition, which the souvenir plot documents are unlikely to contain.

Richard Bridgeman, 7th Earl of Bradford, estimates these sellers having an income of US$2,918,520 per acre (about US$7.2 million per hectare) of poor land, which he suggests could probably be purchased for about US$100. Some of these sellers enclose with the invalid deed a coat of arms; this is not authorised by the Lord Lyon, and so it is unlawful in Scotland to use it. The most recent advice from the Lord Lyon specifically states that the award of a coat of arms is not appropriate to the owner of a souvenir plot, such as sold in these schemes.

=== Manorial lordships ===
The title lord of the manor has feudal origins and is a title of property ownership that is legally capable of sale. The owner of a Lordship of the Manor is known as [personal name], Lord/Lady of the Manor of [place name] it is also acceptable to shorten the title to Lord/Lady of [place name]. According to the style guide Debrett's, a person owning a Scottish Barony title is afforded a particular style, but English lordships of the manor are not mentioned.

There are three elements to a manor:

- lordship of the manor,
- manorial land,
- manorial rights.

These three elements may exist separately or be combined; however the lordship of a manor may be held in moieties and may not be subdivided; this is prohibited by the Statute of Quia Emptores 1290, preventing subinfeudation (except in Scotland, where feudal rights resulting from subinfeudation were extinguished only with the Abolition of Feudal Tenure etc. (Scotland) Act 2000). However the second and third elements can be subdivided.

In many cases, the title of lord of the manor may no longer be connected to land or other rights. In such cases, the title is known as an "incorporeal hereditament". Before the Land Registration Act 2002 it was possible to register lordship titles; most did not seek to register. Since 13 October 2003 one cannot apply for first registration of a title of a manor; however, dealings in previously registered titles remain subject to compulsory registration with HM Land Registry. A frequent criticism of the lordships sold at auction is that statutory declarations are relied upon to substitute for missing historical deeds and transfer documents which would, in some cases, demonstrate that the manor in question either no longer exists, can no longer be identified definitively or is not available for sale.

According to John Martin Robinson, Maltravers Herald Extraordinary and co-author of The Oxford Guide to Heraldry, "Lordship of this or that manor is no more a title than Landlord of The Dog and Duck" ("The Dog and Duck" being a stereotypical name for a pub, with "landlord" being the usual term for someone who runs such an establishment). However, the journal Justice of the Peace & Local Government Law advises that the position is unclear as to whether a lordship of the manor is a title of honour or a dignity, as this is yet to be tested by the courts. Technically, lords of manors are barons, or freemen; however, they do not use the term as a title. John Selden, in Titles of Honour, wrote in 1672, "The word Baro (Latin for 'baron') hath been also so much communicated, that not only all Lords of Mannors have been from ancient time, and are at this day called sometimes Barons (as in the stile of their Court Barons, which is Curia Baronis, &c. And I have read hors de son Barony in a barr to an Avowry for hors de son fee) But also the Judges of the Exchequer have it from antient time fixed on them."

Some companies claim to be selling manorial lordships when in fact they are actually selling nothing more than a trademark. For this reason, careful legal advice should be sought before entering into any transaction purporting to be selling a lordship of a manor.

=== Channel Islands fiefs ===
The Channel Islands have a long and storied history, with human habitation tracing back thousands of years. In 911 AD, the Viking leader Rollo was granted lands around Rouen that later evolved into the Duchy of Normandy. In the resource-scarce 10th century, land was the primary means of rewarding loyal followers.

Much like in France, the Channel Islands were organised into a feudal, pyramidal structure - with the King/Duke at the top, seigneurs (lords) in the middle, and residents/serfs at the bottom. Seigneurs held significant political, social, and economic rights over the inhabitants of their fiefs (estates).

While most feudal institutions have disappeared in the 21st century, the Channel Islands' unique system of fiefs has endured. A "seigneur" is the title given to the male lord of a manor, while a "dame" is the equivalent title for a female fief holder or the wife of a male seigneur.

Purchasing a Channel Island fief is possible for anyone, regardless of nationality or citizenship. However, this occurs infrequently, as fiefs tend to pass down within families. Conveyance requires legal representation, approval by the Royal Court of Guernsey or Jersey, and registration with the Greffier (record keeper).

The number of extant fiefs is estimated at 116 in Jersey, 73 in Guernsey, and 1 on Sark. At least 37 have been acquired by the Crown over time. Seigneurs often hold multiple fiefs - in Guernsey, 46 fiefs are held by just 24 seigneurs.

Channel Island seigneurs maintain significant rights and roles in the modern era. They can defend manorial rights in court, attend Royal Court annually to pay homage, and host traditional dinners. Fief courts, presided over by officials like the Sénéschal and Prévôt, still function with legal authority.

While smaller than English manors or Scottish baronies, Channel Island fiefs can still be substantial, with the largest (Fief le Roi in Guernsey) comprising over 800 acres. Fiefs often consisted of non-contiguous parcels across multiple parishes.

One enduring feudal institution is the congè - a tax paid upon the transfer of fief land. This tax survived in Guernsey until 1985, when it was redirected to the island government rather than the seigneur. On Sark, the congè persisted until 2006. The continued existence of this tax represents de facto recognition of the seigneurial system by the Crown.

=== Changes of name ===
Some companies sell individuals a title when in fact they do no more than offer them the facility to change their name. Such an individual adopts the purported title, e.g. "Sir" or "Lord", as a forename rather than receiving any formal title. This practice is lawful so long as no claim of noble title, knighthood etc. is made as, in British law, a person may adopt any name provided its purpose is not fraudulent. HM Passport Office is aware of this practice and will place an official observation in the individual's passport stating that the purported title is a name rather than the person's title.

=== English feudal baronial titles ===
Whether English feudal barony titles are valid is unclear.

== Continental European titles ==
All of Europe's monarchies, except Norway, recognise nobility and hereditary titles. Their royal and princely courts also allow their use as courtesy titles by persons entitled to them under former monarchical regimes, unless they are accredited (e.g., to the Court of St. James's) in a diplomatic capacity without the use of their historical titles. Such courtesies do not imply a legal right to any title in the titleholder's homeland, although foreign nobles may be incorporated into another realm's nobility with a variation of the family's original noble title upon being naturalised in some monarchies (Belgium, Liechtenstein, Luxembourg, Netherlands).

Many who choose to invent false titles of nobility take advantage of the pool of formerly genuine titles of nobility that derive from a time when a country, now a republic, was once a monarchy; for example Austria, Hungary and the many parts of Germany that once had princely rulers who granted noble titles. One advantage of assuming such a title, is that, contrary to the situation involving the British nobility, there is usually no longer any official arbitrator who can or will judge between two separate claimants to such a title. In some such countries, titles may nevertheless be protected by an appropriate law, such as France, or by an extension of copyright law, as in Portugal.

=== Austria ===
Titles were hereditary for all legal descendants in the male line, male and female; primogeniture was not usual. Austria, however, legally abolished its nobility and hereditary titles after World War I and bans the use of noble titles and nobiliary particles.

=== Finland ===
Finland became a republic in 1917, and issue of new titles and substantial privileges of the estates of the realm were abolished by 1920. However, the nobility was not abolished, and they retain exclusivity to their surnames by personal name laws. Claiming a false title of nobility for purposes of marriage remains a criminal offense.

=== France ===
In medieval France, the nobility was organised hierarchically, with all noble status stemming from the rank of écuyer (squire), which was personal and not based on land. Higher titles, such as seigneur, baron, count, marquis, and duke, were historically linked to land ownership. A seigneur or baron typically held a single manor, while a count oversaw multiple manors or an important parish. Larger holdings belonged to marquises and dukes, particularly those on border territories. Nobles (noblesse) were exempt from many taxes but owed military service and judicial responsibilities. As noble families dwindled due to war, wealthy roturiers (commoners) could enter the nobility. The process known as noblesse à tierce foy allowed non-nobles to become noble after three generations of homage while holding a noble fief. However, owning a noble fief alone did not bestow nobility, as emphasised by King Henry III.

By the 17th century, there were seven recognised paths to noble status: descent from a noble ancestor, maternal inheritance (in limited cases), knighthood, royal letters patent, noble office, long military service, and the noblesse à tierce foy process. Unlike the British heraldic system, French arms were prescriptive and tied to nobility rather than granted. A 1613 edict prohibited non-nobles from using noble titles or heraldic coronets without authorisation. The French Revolution abolished noble privileges and feudal tenure but did not eliminate noble identities or titles as social markers. While many title deeds were destroyed, titles often survived among émigré nobles and clergy. This created a legal and social distinction between the loss of privilege and the survival of noble names. Under King Louis XVIII, both the old and new nobility were recognised, with instances such as the Château d'Esclignac being affirmed as a duchy in 1848.

Although France became a republic in 1870, feudal titles are still recognised in civil law as historical designations, not noble statuses. These titles are tied to land, often castles or historic estates, and cannot be sold independently. Individuals may acquire a title by purchasing titled land and registering it through a notaire, a state-appointed legal official. Proper documentation is required to register titles in the French État civil, and foreign nationals may use French titles if acquired lawfully. However, titles do not confer noble status, which no longer exists as a legal caste in France. Modern title usage is symbolic and social, rather than legal or political. Some owners also assume historic coats of arms, occasionally with support from foreign heraldic authorities like the Chief Herald of Malta, as France lacks an official heraldic body.

It is unclear whether feudal titles were abolished along with feudalism or merely stripped of legal privileges. The situation mirrors that of Scotland, where feudal tenure was abolished but titles in the Baronage of Scotland were preserved as intangible dignity. Today, genuine French feudal titles are acquired through legal transfer of titled land, supported by historical evidence and formal notarisation. The Ministry of Justice maintains a title registry and can issue decrees of investiture to heirs of recognised titles, though many descendants of noble families continue to use courtesy titles without official sanction. Scholars estimate that fewer than 5% of title claims today are legally or historically valid, with fraudulent or invented titles remaining common.

=== Germany ===
German royalty and nobility bore hereditary titles, noble titles being heritable to all legitimate descendants in the male line, male and female: primogeniture was not usual except in the Kingdom of Prussia. The German nobility lost its hereditary prerogatives, including rank, style and honorifics following the fall of the German Empire in 1918. Article 109 of the 1919 Weimar Constitution declared that "noble ranks are regarded as part of the (sur-)name only". Persons legally adopted by former nobles, like e.g. Frédéric Prinz von Anhalt, can acquire the surname (Prinz von Anhalt), but do not become members of the nobility (in this case, they do not become a prince, as such a thing has not legally existed for over a century).

=== Italy ===
Some vendors of fake titles claim to arrange for the customer to acquire an Italian title based on adoption or even through notarial acts ceding the titles to the customer. In Italy, where titles of nobility have not been officially recognised since 1948, and where nobility by feudal tenure was abolished in most regions during the years immediately before 1820, an adoptive child cannot succeed to his adoptive parent's title, and no legal act can serve to renounce a hereditary title. Claims to sell titles of nobility linked to ownership of a certain estate or castle are based on equally misguided misconceptions. No Italian publication or record, not even the Consulta Araldica's official registry (the Libro d'Oro now retained at the Central Archives of the State in Rome), is a truly complete record of Italy's nobles and armigers.

Several legitimate titles recognised in the pre-unitary Italian states (the Two Sicilies, Tuscany, Parma, Modena, the Papal States), as well as San Marino, were not recognised in the Kingdom of Italy between 1860 and 1948. In most cases, these were small baronies, minor lordships (signorie) or untitled ennoblements (patrizi and nobili). In connection with this, some Sicilian titles could devolve to female heiresses in the absence of close male kin, and in a few instances, there are claimants (in female lines) in Spain as well as Italy, the former looking to Two Sicilies (pre-1860) legislation and the latter citing Italian (post-1860) law. Most of the parallel claims (usually by Spanish citizens) were made after 1948 when the Consulta Araldica (Italy's heraldic authority) was suspended by the Italian constitution, which abolished recognition of titles of nobility.

With the advent of the republican constitution after the Second World War, Italy decided to include noble titles in the name. In the same constitution, in the "transitional and final provisions" the founding fathers decided to join the noble title to the name for living persons only and make it impossible to hand down the title even to natural children. Similar titles (such as "Knight of the Republic" or "Cavaliere del Lavoro") can be delivered on an exclusive, non-hereditary and symbolic basis only by the President of the Republic.

=== Norway ===
Recognition of Norwegian noble titles was gradually abolished by the Nobility Law of 1821. Persons who in 1821 possessed such titles were allowed to keep them for their lifetimes.

There exists no law that prohibits private use of noble titles. Such privately adopted titles lack official recognition.

Noble names enjoy no particular legal protection. In accordance with the Name Law's paragraph 3, any family name with 200 or fewer bearers is protected and may not, without all bearers' acceptance, be adopted by another.

=== Poland ===
Unlike other European states except Hungary, the Polish–Lithuanian Commonwealth and its predecessor states did not have a noble class divided into dukes, counts, barons, etc. The privileged noble/gentleman class, the szlachta, were all theoretically equal to each other and made up 6–12% of the population. The problem of false claims to szlachta was widespread in the 16th century, Hieronim Nekanda Trepka denouncing such fakes in Liber generationis plebeanorium.

After the Partitions of Poland (1772–95) the Polish state ceased to exist. Some Polish notables received titles of Russian nobility, Prussian nobility or Austrian nobility.

Because there was no Polish state and a wide Polish diaspora, it became easy for Poles to claim to be exiled nobility, whether they had szlachta ancestors or not. The "fake Polish count" became a stock character in 19th- and 20th-century literature.

Fiction featuring fake Polish nobility includes: the novels The Idiot, The Green Face and The Whispering City, and the films Roberta (1935) and Victor/Victoria.

Real-life people who falsely claimed to be Polish nobles include:

- Christoph Bienenfeld (Baron Hönig von Bienenfeld)
- Roger de la Burde
- Marek and Andrew Kasperski
- Casimir Markievicz, who married the Irish leader Constance Gore-Booth. She continued to be known as "Countess Markievicz"
- Paweł Strzelecki, although born into the szlachta, was called a "Count" in Australia, but it is not clear if he used the title himself.
- Józef Boruwłaski, a Polish-born dwarf and musician who settled in Durham, England, and is buried in the Cathedral there. A portrait and his clothes survive in the Town hall, and a small folly by the river is named 'The Count's House' as he was erroneously thought to have lived there.

== Irish titles ==
It is unclear whether Irish feudal barony titles are valid.

== See also ==
- British honours system
- British nobility
- Business operations of Sealand—includes the sale of novelty titles of nobility
- Fount of honour
- Gentry
- Landed gentry
- Scam genealogical book
- Scottish peerage
- Self-styled orders
