= Sergeant Preston of the Yukon (TV series) =

1950s American television series

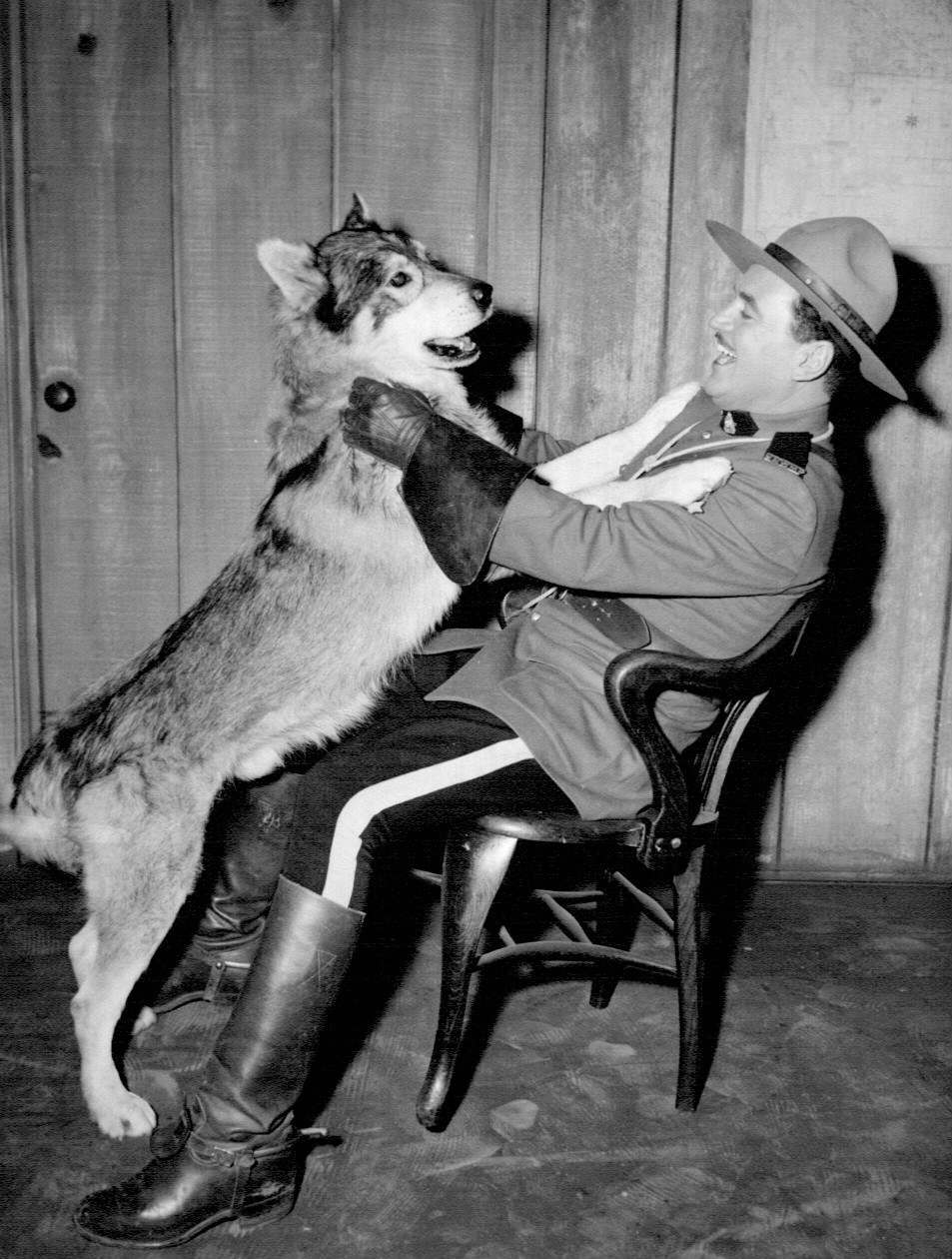
- Richard Simmons as Sergeant Preston with Yukon King, 1955
- Genre: Action; Adventure; Northwestern
- Created by: George W. Trendle; Fran Striker
- Starring: Richard Simmons
- Country of origin: United States
- Original language: English
- No. of seasons: 3
- No. of episodes: 78

Production
- Executive producers: Charles E. Skinner (1955-1957), Tom R. Curtis (1957-1958)
- Running time: 22–24 minute
- Production companies: Charles E. Skinner Productions (seasons 1-2), Tom R. Curtis Productions (seasons 2-3, starting with "The Stolen Malamute")

Original release
- Network: CBS
- Release: September 29, 1955 – September 25, 1958

Sergeant Preston of the Yukon is a half-hour long American action adventure northwestern television series, broadcast in color on CBS Thursday evenings at 7:30 to 8:00 p.m. from September 29, 1955, to September 25, 1958. It was based on the radio drama Challenge of the Yukon.

== Synopsis ==
Richard Simmons starred as Sergeant Preston, who patrolled the Yukon Territory in search of renegades and outlaws, during the time of the Klondike Gold Rush of the 1890s. In every episode, Preston was assisted by his Alaskan Malamute Yukon King, who had been raised by a female wolf. Simmons was signed to play the role in May 1955 by executive producer-director Charles E. Simmons. In episodes taking place during the summer he rode his horse Rex.

The show's theme music was the overture to Emil von Reznicek's opera Donna Diana. As the theme played the announcer stated: "Sergeant Preston of the North-West Mounted Police, with Yukon King, swiftest and strongest lead dog, breaking the trail in the relentless pursuit of lawbreakers in the wild days of the Yukon."

At the end of each episode, Preston would turn to his dog and say "Well, King, this case is closed."

== Production ==
In March 1955 before filming of the series began, Quaker Oats inked a three-year $10 million deal for the rights to sponsor the half-hour adventures series. The program was filmed in mountainous sections of Big Bear, California and the historic mining ghost town of Ashcroft, Colorado, which was reconstructed to look like the Klondike Gold Rush towns of Dawson and White Horse in Canada's Yukon Territory. During the first season and most the second season, the show's interior scenes were shot at the Westfilm Studios on Yucca Street in Hollywood, which Charles E. Skinner Productions leased for a four-year term in June 1955, the same month Sergeant Preston of the Yukon began filming. Trendle-Campbell-Meurer, Inc. Enterprise produced all three seasons of the program in association with Charles E. Skinner Productions, which handled production of the first 52 episodes, and Tom R. Curtis Productions, which took over producing the series on December 1, 1956 when it went back into production at Paramount Sunset Corporation rental studios on Bronson Avenue in Hollywood to film an additional 26 episodes for the tail end of the second season (starting with The Stolen Malamute) and third and final season. Curtis, a former production man for Skinner, served as the series new Executive Producer while Skinner went on to develop pilots for two new television series, Riders of the Pony Express and Men of the Crime Lab. In June 1957, the Jack Wrather Corporation purchased all rights, including comic strip, merchandising, license and novel, serialization and film rights, to the series and package of 78 completed color episodes being broadcast on CBS from George W. Trendle, Allen Campbell, and Raymond Meurer, the three principals of Trendle-Campbell-Meurer, Inc. Enterprise of Detroit, for $1.5 million.

== Cast ==
=== Main ===
- Richard Simmons as Sergeant William Preston
- Yukon King (dog)
- Rex (horse)
- Vic Perrin (actor) as Narrator (uncredited, 48 programs, Seasons 1-3)
- Gayne Whitman (actor) as Narrator (uncredited, 10 programs, Seasons 2-3)

=== Guest stars ===
The guest stars on Sergeant Preston included:

- Francis De Sales appeared in five episodes, concluding as Cy Bartok in "The Diamond Collar".
- Kelo Henderson, played Pete Hollis in the 1958 episode "Escape to the North".
- Ed Hinton appeared twice in 1956 as Barry Jeffers in "Remember the Maine" and as Lefty "Red" Burke in "The Rookie".
- I. Stanford Jolley was Sam Haley in "The Fancy Dan" (1956) and Frisco in "Gold Rush Patrol" (1958).
- Tyler MacDuff played Bill Corey in "Lost River Roundup" in 1957.
- John M. Pickard appeared four times in 1956–1957 in different roles, including the role of Red Brody in "Old Ben's Gold".
- Robert Shayne, was in the 1957 episode, "The Mark of Crime."
- William Boyett appeared as Constable Malloy in "Gold Fever" from 1956, and appeared as Cary Braddock in "Ten Little Indians" from 1957.
- Dan Blocker played 'Mule' Conklin in "Underground Ambush" from 1957.

== Episodes ==
=== Season 1 (1955–56) ===
No. overall	No. in season	Title	Directed by	Written by	Original release date
1	1	"Vindication of Yukon King"	Charles E. Skinner	Dwight Babcock	September 29, 1955
2	2	"Rebellion in the North"	Charles E. Skinner	Nelson Gidding	October 6, 1955
3	3	"Trouble at Hogsback"	Charles E. Skinner	Robert Bennett	October 13, 1955
4	4	"Incident at Gordon Landing"	Edward Dew	Sydney Slon	October 20, 1955
5	5	"Bad Medicine"	Edward Dew	Maurice Tombragel	October 27, 1955
6	6	"Hidden Gold"	Edward Dew	Andre Bohen & Lou Vittes	November 3, 1955
7	7	"Last Mail from Last Chance"	Edward Dew	Nelson Gidding	November 10, 1955
8	8	"The Assassins"	Edward Dew	Maurice Tombragel	November 17, 1955
9	9	"Golden Gift"	Charles E. Skinner	Stanley Silverman	November 24, 1955
10	10	"Cry Wolf"	Edward Dew	Robert Bennett	December 1, 1955
11	11	"Girl from Vancouver"	Edward Dew	Sidney Slon	December 8, 1955
12	12	"Treasure of Fifteen Mile Creek"	Edward Dew	Oliver Drake	December 15, 1955
13	13	"The Boy Nobody Wanted"	Edward Dew	Dwight Babcock	December 22, 1955
14	14	"The Mad Wolf of Lost Canyon"	Edward Dew	Robert Bennett	December 29, 1955
15	15	"One Bear Too Many"	Edward Dew	Robert C. Bennett	January 5, 1956
16	16	"Crime at Wounded Moose"	Edward Dew	Sidney Slon	January 12, 1956
17	17	"Dog Race"	Edward Dew	Robert C. Bennett	January 19, 1956
18	18	"Phantom of Phoenixville"	Alan Crosland, Jr.	Robert C. Bennett	January 26, 1956
19	19	"Trapped"	Charles D. Livingstone	Robert C. Bennett	February 2, 1956
20	20	"Justice at Goneaway Creek"	John Peyser	Maurice Tombragel	February 9, 1956
21	21	"Skagway Secret"	Charles D. Livingstone	Robert C. Bennett	February 16, 1956
22	22	"Relief Train"	Edward Dew	Robert C. Bennett	February 23, 1956
23	23	"Totem Treasure"	Edward Dew	Written by : Don Leigh; Suggested by a Radio Play by : Tom Dougall	March 1, 1956
24	24	"One Good Turn"	John Peyser	Written by : Maurice Tombragel; Suggested by a Radio Play by : Tom Dougall	March 8, 1956
25	25	"The Cache"	Alan Crosland, Jr.	Written by : Lawrence Goldman; Suggested by a Radio Play by : Tom Dougall	March 15, 1956
26	26	"Cinderella of the Yukon"	Charles E. Skinner	Written by : Robert C. Bennett; Suggested by a Radio Play by : Fran Striker	March 22, 1956
27	27	"Gold Fever"	Edward Dew	Written by : Maurice Tombragel; Suggested by a Radio Play by : Tom Dougall	March 29, 1956
28	28	"The Fancy Dan"	Alan Crosland, Jr.	Written by : Robert C. Bennett; Suggested by a Radio Play by : Tom Dougall	April 5, 1956
29	29	"The Coward"	Edward Dew	Written by : Robert C. Bennett; Suggested by a Radio Play by : Fran Striker	April 12, 1956
30	30	"Father of the Crime"	Edward Dew	Written by : Maurice Tombragel; Suggested by a Radio Play by : Tom Dougall	April 19, 1956
31	31	"Remember the Maine"	Charles D. Livingstone	Written by : Stanley Silverman; Suggested by a Radio Play by : Dan Beattie	April 26, 1956
32	32	"Love and Honor"	Edward Dew	Written by : Maurice Tombragel; Suggested by a Radio Play by : Tom Dougall	May 3, 1956
33	33	"All is Not Gold"	Edward Dew	Written by : Robert C. Bennett; Suggested by a Radio Play by : Fran Striker	May 10, 1956

=== Season 2 (1956–57) ===
No. overall	No. in season	Title	Directed by	Written by	Original release date
34	1	"Limping King"	Edward Dew	Stanley Silverman	September 13, 1956
35	2	"The Rookie"	Edward Dew	Written by : Robert C. Bennett; Suggested by a Radio Play by : Dan Beattie	September 20, 1956
36	3	"Pack Ice Justice"	Edward Dew	Written by : Lawrence Goldman; Suggested by a Radio PLay by : Mildred Merrill	September 27, 1956
37	4	"Revenge"	Alan Crosland, Jr.	Written by : Ed Adamson; Suggested by a Radio Play by : Tom Dougall	October 4, 1956
38	5	"Littlest Rookie"	Charles D. Livingstone	Lawrence Goldman	October 11, 1956
39	6	"Lost Patrol"	Alan Crosland, Jr.	Written by : Robert C. Bennett; Suggested by a Radio Play by : Tom Dougall	October 18, 1956
40	7	"King of Herschel Island"	Charles D. Livingstone	Written by : Robert C. Bennett; Suggested by a Radio Play by : Tom Dougall	October 25, 1956
41	8	"Ghost of the Anvil"	Edward Dew	William Lively	November 1, 1956
42	9	"Eye of Evil"	Edward Dew	Written by : Robert C. Bennett; Suggested by a Radio Play by : Tom Dougall	November 8, 1956
43	10	"Luck of the Trail"	Alan Crosland, Jr.	Written by : Lawrence Goldman; Suggested by a Radio Play by : Dan Beattie	November 15, 1956
44	11	"Return Visit"	Edward Dew	Ed Adamson	November 22, 1956
45	12	"The Tobacco Smugglers"	Alan Crosland, Jr.	Written by : Naurice Tombragel; Suggested by a Radio Play by : Mildred Merrill	November 29, 1956
46	13	"Turnabout"	Edward Dew	Written by : Ed Adamson; Suggested by a Radio Play by : Tom Dougall	December 6, 1956
47	14	"Emergency on Scarface Flat"	Frank E. Myers	Robert C. Bennett	December 13, 1956
48	15	"The Williwaw"	Alan Crosland, Jr.	Robert C. Bennett	December 20, 1956
49	16	"Border Action"	Edward Dew	Written by : Robert C. Bennett; Suggested by a Radio Play by : Tom Dougall	December 27, 1956
50	17	"The Black Ace"	W.B. Eason	Fran Striker	January 3, 1957
51	18	"Scourge of the Wilderness"	Alan Crosland, Jr.	William Lively	January 10, 1957
52	19	"Blind Justice"	Alan Crosland, Jr.	Robert C. Bennett	January 17, 1957
53	20	"The Stolen Malamute"	Edward Dew	Written by : Fran Striker; Suggested by an Original Story by : Fran Striker	April 4, 1957
54	21	"The Devil's Roost"	Edward Dew	Written by : Don Clark; Suggested by an Original Story by : Tom Dougall	April 11, 1957
55	22	"Ten Little Indians"	Edward Dew	Written by : Robert C. Bennett; Suggested by an Original Story by : Tom Dougall	April 18, 1957
56	23	"Underground Ambush"	Edward Dew	Written by : Dwight Babcock; Suggested by an Original Story by : Tom Dougall	April 25, 1957

=== Season 3 (1957–58) ===
No. overall	No. in season	Title	Directed by	Written by	Original release date
57	1	"Old Ben's Gold"	Earl Bellamy	Written by : Oliver Drake; Suggested by an Original Story by : Dan Beattie	October 3, 1957
58	2	"The Rebel Yell"	Earl Bellamy	Written by : Robert C. Bennett; Suggested by an Original Story by : Tom Dougall	October 10, 1957
59	3	"The Mark of Crime"	Edward Dew	Written by : Fran Striker; Suggested by an Original Story by : Fran Striker	October 17, 1957
60	4	"Storm the Pass"	Edward Dew	Written by : Dwight Babcock; Suggested by an Original Story by : Tom Dougall	October 24, 1957
61	5	"Old Faithful"	Earl Bellamy	Written by : Robert C. Bennett; Suggested by an Original Story by : Tom Dougall	October 31, 1957
62	6	"The Skull in the Stone"	Charles E. Skinner	Dwight Babcock	November 7, 1957
63	7	"Ghost Mine"	Earl Bellamy	Written by : Robert C. Bennett; Suggested by an Original Story by : Tom Dougall	November 14, 1957
64	8	"The Jailbreaker"	Earl Bellamy	Fran Striker	November 21, 1957
65	9	"Out of the Night"	Alan Crosland, Jr.	Written by : William Lively; Suggested by an Original Story by : Tom Dougall	November 28, 1957
66	10	"Three Men in Black"	Edward Dew	Written by : Ed Adamson; Suggested by an Original Story by : Dan Beattie	December 5, 1957
67	11	"Lost River Roundup"	Alan Crosland, Jr.	Written by : William Lively; Suggested by a Radio Play by : Tom Dougall	December 12, 1957
68	12	"The Old Timer"	Earl Bellamy	Written by : Don Clark; Suggested by an Original Story by : Tom Dougall	December 19, 1957
69	13	"Battle at Bradley's"	Edward Dew	Written by : Dwight Babcock; Suggested by an Original Story by : Tom Dougall	December 26, 1957
70	14	"The Generous Hobo"	Edward Dew	Written by : Robert C. Bennett; Suggested by an Original Story by : Tom Dougall	January 2, 1958
71	15	"Follow the Leader"	Earl Bellamy	Alan Christie	January 9, 1958
72	16	"Gold Rush Patrol"	Earl Bellamy	Written by : Ron Ormond & Guy Tedesco; Suggested by an Original Story by : Tom Dougall	January 16, 1958
73	17	"Grizzly"	Alan Crosland, Jr.	Written by : William Lively; Suggested by a Radio Play by : Tom Dougall	January 23, 1958
74	18	"The Diamond Collar"	Edward Dew	Written by : Robert C Bennett; Suggested by an Original Story by : Tom Dougall	January 30, 1958
75	19	"Escape to the North"	Alan Crosland, Jr.	Written by : William Lively; Suggested by a Radio Play by : Tom Dougall	February 6, 1958
76	20	"Outlaw in Uniform"	Alan Crosland, Jr.	Written by : William Lively; Suggested by a Radio Play by : Tom Dougall	February 13, 1958
77	21	"Boy Alone"	Edward Dew	Written by : Fran Striker; Suggested by an Original Story by : Tom Dougall	February 20, 1958
78	22	"The Criminal Collie"	Earl Bellamy	Written by : Ernst Fegté; Suggested by an Original Story by : Tom Dougall	February 27, 1958

== Release ==
=== Syndication ===
Because the series was filmed in color it remained popular long after its original prime-time broadcast. Starting in the early 1960s it was shown on Saturday mornings. The popular show aired internationally for decades.

During the 2010s, the series was shown on GRIT classic TV/movie network, and on FETV (Family Entertainment TV).

=== DVD ===
Timeless Media Group released a two-disc best-of set featuring ten episodes from the series in Region 1 on November 21, 2006.

Infinity Entertainment has released all three seasons of the series on DVD in Region 1.

== Comic books ==
Dell Comics had produced Sergeant Preston comics based on the radio version, and then from 1956 to 1959 they brought out 29 issues based on the television series.

In the 1980s, Don Sherwood adapted the series into comic books, with scripts by Stan Stunell.

== Sponsorship ==
In 1955, the Quaker Oats company gave away land in the Klondike as part of the Klondike Big Inch Land Promotion which was tied in with the television show. Genuine deeds each to one square inch of a lot in Yukon Territory, issued by Klondike Big Inch Land Co. Inc., were inserted into Quaker's Puffed Wheat and Puffed Rice cereal boxes.
