= THP-1 =

THP-1 may refer to:

- THP-1 cell line
- THP-1, the first synthetic estrogen
