= Benzoin =

Benzoin may refer to:

- Benzoin (organic compound), an organic compound with the formula PhCH(OH)C(O)Ph
- Benzoin (resin), a balsamic resin obtained from the bark of several species of trees in the genus Styrax
- Benzoin aldolase, an enzyme that catalyzes the chemical reaction benzoin to benzaldehyde
- Benzoin condensation, a reaction between two aromatic aldehydes
- Benzoin odoriferum or Lindera benzoin, a shrub in the laurel family
- Benzoin tree, the common name of Styrax, a genus of shrubs or trees in the family Styracaceae
- Tincture of benzoin, a pungent solution of benzoin resin in ethanol

== See also ==
- C_{14}H_{12}O_{2}, molecular formula of benzoin
- Benzene (C_{6}H_{6}), organic chemical compound of hydrocarbon class
- Benzoic acid (or C_{6}H_{5}COOH), colorless crystalline solid and aromatic carboxylic acid
