= Established Titles =

Hong Kong souvenir plot company

- Founded: 2019
- Founder: Katerina Yip
- Headquarters: Hong Kong
- Products: Souvenir plots
- Parent: Galton Voysey
- Website: establishedtitles.com

Established Titles is a company which sells souvenir plots of Scottish land from 1 sq ft (0.09 m^{2}) to 20 sq ft (1.86 m^{2}). The company retains legal ownership of the land. While the company claims that those who buy the 'plots' can choose to be titled Lord, Laird or Lady, as part of a supposed "traditional Scottish custom", souvenir plots are too small to be legally registered for ownership and owners of souvenir plots do not have the right to officially title themselves. It owns land in Ardallie, Aberdeenshire, Dunfermline, Dumfries, Galloway and the Borders. YouTuber Scott Shafer's video alleging that the company was a scam caused significant controversy and many YouTubers to drop sponsorships from the company.

== Operations ==
It was founded by CEO Katerina Yip. Established Titles has allegedly been referred to the Advertising Standards Authority. It received backlash for its aggressive marketing efforts, which involves recruiting YouTubers for promotions. The company is owned by Hong Kong–based investment firm, Galton Voysey Ltd. In 2026 an investigation by the Podcast Scams, Hacks & Frauds discovered at least one of the properties had been passed to a new Hong Kong registered company called United Conservation Holdings Limited in March 2025, but it was not immediately clear what relationship this company has to Galton Voysey.

== Controversy ==
On 23 November 2022, YouTuber Scott Shafer uploaded a video accusing Established Titles of being a scam that misleads its customers, advising YouTubers to stop working with the company as they do not legally bestow ownership. After the video went viral, many YouTubers dropped their sponsorships, including Philip DeFranco and SomeOrdinaryGamers. Established Titles defended itself in a letter to its partners saying that it was "under a targeted, completely unfounded attack based on bogus claims", claiming that it had been transparent about its practices. Many other YouTubers have released videos reasserting Shafer's stance.

Legally, the company never transfers ownership of the plots to the customers, but even if they did, the Court of the Lord Lyon has stated that "ownership of a souvenir plot of land does not bring with it the right to any description such as ‘laird’, ‘lord’ or ‘lady’". The Court also stated that laird is not a title but a description of an owner of a large estate, not a residential sized property or smaller, and that the titles lord or lady can only be conferred by letters patent, at the pleasure of the Sovereign. Additionally, the Land Registration etc. (Scotland) Act 2012 specifically excludes souvenir plots, which it defines as a plot "of inconsiderable size and of no practical utility", from being registered in Scotland.

Established Titles said that the plots were "a fun gift, meant for a good laugh" and that customers are aware of this; this has been refuted, according to NBC News, by customers who have reported that they believed they were buying land.
