= Estrin (molecule) =

Names
- IUPAC name Estra-1,3,5(10)-triene
- Systematic IUPAC name (3aS,3bS,9bS,11aS)-11a-Methyl-2,3,3a,3b,4,5,9b,10,11,11a-decahydro-1H-cyclopenta[a]phenanthrene
- Other names Estratriene

Identifiers
CAS Number	1217-09-0
3D model (JSmol)	Interactive image
ChEMBL	ChEMBL1627934
ChemSpider	133001
PubChem CID	150899
UNII	F274X7VR4M
CompTox Dashboard (EPA)	DTXSID10923933
- InChI: InChI=1S/C18H24/c1-18-11-4-7-17(18)16-9-8-13-5-2-3-6-14(13)15(16)10-12-18/h2-3,5-6,15-17H,4,7-12H2,1H3/t15-,16-,17+,18+/m1/s1 Key: HLCRYAZDZCJZFG-BDXSIMOUSA-N
- SMILES: C[C@@]12CCC[C@H]1[C@@H]3CCC4=CC=CC=C4[C@H]3CC2

Properties
Chemical formula	C_{18}H_{24}
Molar mass	240.39 g/mol
- Except where otherwise noted, data are given for materials in their standard state (at 25 °C [77 °F], 100 kPa). Infobox references

Estrin (American English), or oestrin (British English), also known as estra-1,3,5(10)-triene, is an estrane steroid. It is dehydrogenated estrane with double bonds specifically at the C1, C3, and C5(10) positions. Estrin is a parent structure of the estrogen steroid hormones estradiol, estrone, and estriol, which have also been known as dihydroxyestrin, ketohydroxyestrin, and trihydroxyestrin, respectively.

The estrin hydrocarbon itself possesses minimal estrogenic activity, as alcohol and/or keto substitutions at the C3 and C17 positions are critical for high binding affinity to the estrogen receptors. Estrin has been found to be on the order of 1,000-fold less potent than estradiol in inducing estrogenic responses in vitro. In addition to estrin, estratrien-17β-ol, which lacks the 3-hydroxyl group of estradiol, and 3-hydroxyestratriene, which lacks the 17β-hydroxyl group of estradiol, both have measurable affinity for the estrogen receptor and are able to activate the receptor and induce progesterone receptor expression.

The term estrin is also a synonym for estrogen. It was coined by Sir Alan S. Parkes and C. W. Bellerby in 1926 to describe the hormone secreted from the ovaries that induces estrus in animals (i.e., estrogen).

Structures of major endogenous estrogens
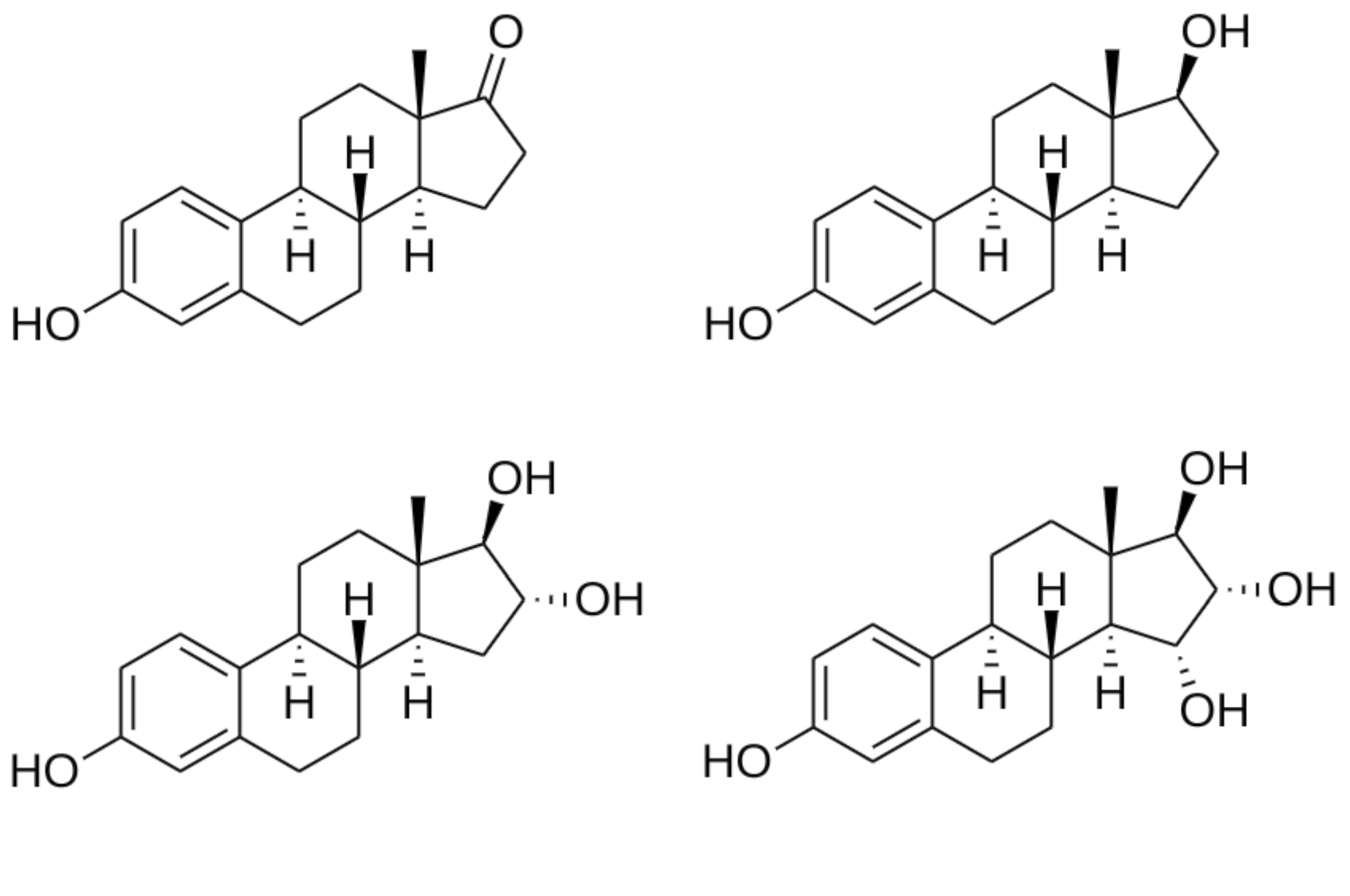
Note the hydroxyl (–OH) groups: estrone (E1) has one, estradiol (E2) has two, estriol (E3) has three, and estetrol (E4) has four.

== See also ==
- 1-Keto-1,2,3,4-tetrahydrophenanthrene
