= Richard Simmons (actor) =

American actor (1913-2003)

Richard "Dick" Simmons
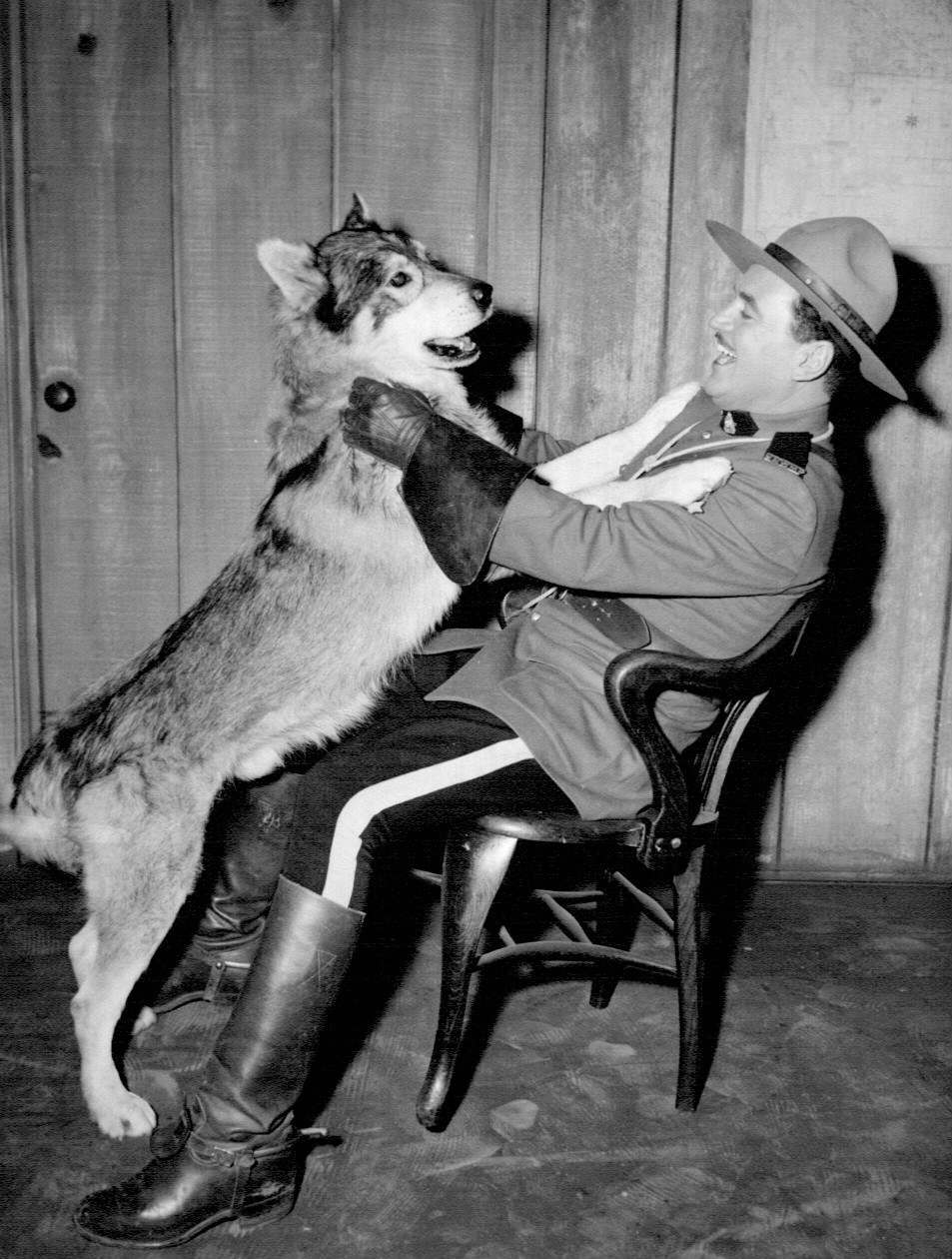
- Simmons as Sergeant Preston with Yukon King, 1955
- Born: August 19, 1913; Saint Paul, Minnesota, U.S.
- Died: January 11, 2003 (aged 89); Oceanside, California, U.S.
- Occupations: Motion picture and television actor
- Years active: 1937–1982
- Spouse: Joni Simmons (m. 1941; died 1987) Billie Simmons (m. 2002)
- Children: 2

Richard Simmons (August 19, 1913 – January 11, 2003) was an American actor.

== Early life ==
Simmons was born in Saint Paul, Minnesota, and his family later moved across the Mississippi River to Minneapolis. There, he attended West Side High School and then the University of Minnesota, where he studied drama. Simmons was a professional pilot.

== Career ==
While attending the university, Simmons competed in fencing and swimming, and also acted in a few theater productions. Simmons left the Twin Cities in the 1930s to launch his film acting career in 1937. He soon became an MGM contract player. Many of his minor movie roles went uncredited through the 1940s. One even included his portrayal of a Mountie in King of the Royal Mounted produced by Republic Pictures.

Starting in 1943, he began appearing in credited roles, beginning with his appearance in The Youngest Profession, starring Virginia Weidler. From 1943 through 1949, he appeared in 17 films, of which 10 listed him in the credits.

Simmons interrupted his film career to serve as a flight officer pilot with the Air Transport Command in World War II.

The 1950s mirrored the 1940s, with his appearing in several films and television series, at times uncredited. In 1952, he played the co-pilot in Above and Beyond. In 1955, Simmons won his best-known role, portraying Sergeant William Preston in Sergeant Preston of the Yukon. Following the end of the series in 1958, he continued to have a successful acting career, mostly in television series guest appearances, through 1982. Simmons appeared in a 1962 episode of Leave it to Beaver ("The Parking Attendant"), and in 1963, an episode of Perry Mason ("The Case of the Decadent Dean") and an episode of Leave it to Beaver ("Beaver the Caddy"). In 1964, he appeared in the episode "Tin Can Man" (aired November 5, 1964) of The Munsters as Harold Balding, the principal of Eddie Munster's school. His last role was in a 1982 episode of CHiPs.

== Later life and death ==
In the 1970s, when acting roles became scarce, Simmons managed a mobile home park in Carlsbad, near San Diego. Towards the end of his life, Simmons was diagnosed with Alzheimer's disease. He died on January 11, 2003, at the age of 89, in an Oceanside, California, nursing home.
