= Ritter Blaubart =

1920 fairy-tale opera by Emil von Reznicek

- fairy-tale opera by Emil von Reznicek
- Translation: Knight Bluebeard
- Librettist: Herbert Eulenberg
- Language: German
- Based on: Ritter Blaubart by Eulenberg
- Premiere: 29 January 1920; Staatstheater Darmstadt

Ritter Blaubart (Knight Bluebeard) is a fairy-tale opera (German: Märchenoper) in three acts by the Austrian composer Emil Nikolaus von Reznicek. Herbert Eulenberg wrote the German libretto, based on his own five-act play with the same title, which had been first performed unsuccessfully at the Lessing Theater in Berlin in 1906.

== Composition history ==
Reznicek's first sketches date from the autumn of 1915. Eulenberg revised the text of his play in consultation with the composer, reducing the number of acts to three (the original acts one and two, and the original acts four and five were both condensed to one act). Several cuts were made, and a few minor scenes were eliminated. This resulted in the story becoming much more focused on the psychology and pathological character of the title figure. Reznicek composed the music during 1917-18. The score was published by Universal Edition Vienna.

== Performance history ==
After an unsuccessful attempt to get the opera staged in Berlin in 1918 (despite the support of Richard Strauss), it was first performed on 29 January 1920 at the Staatstheater Darmstadt, with Michael Balling conducting and Johannes Bischoff in the title role. The same year, further performances took place at the Berlin State Opera (first performance on 31 October 1920 conducted by Leo Blech, followed by a further twenty-six performances during the following six years), and also in Vienna and Leipzig.

== Roles ==
| Role | Voice type | Premiere cast 29 January 1920 (Conductor: Michael Balling) |
|---|---|---|
| Knight Bluebeard (Ritter Blaubart) | baritone | Johannes Bischoff |
| Count Nikolaus (Graf Nikolaus) | bass | |
| Werner, his son | tenor | |
| Judith, his daughter | soprano | |
| Agnes, his daughter | soprano | |
| Josua, Bluebeard's blind servant | tenor | |
| The Pastor (Der Pfarrer) | bass | |
| Hinz, a graverobber | bass | |
| Ratte, a graverobber | tenor | |

== Instrumentation ==
The orchestral score requires:

- 5 flutes, 3 oboes, 5 clarinets, 3 bassoons;
- 8 horns, 6 trumpets, 6 trombones, 2 tubas;
- timpani, percussion (3 players), 3 harps, celesta, lute (or guitar);
- strings (violins I, violins II, violas, violoncellos, double basses).

== Recordings ==
In 2003 CPO released the world premiere recording. This recording was made in March 2002 with Michail Jurowski conducting the Berlin Radio Symphony Orchestra, and baritone David Pittman-Jennings in the title role.
