= Challenge of the Yukon =

American radio adventure series

- Genre: Radio drama
- Running time: 17–30 minutes per episode
- Country of origin: United States
- Language: English
- Created by: Fran Striker and George W. Trendle
- Original release: January 3, 1939; 87 years ago on WXYT (WXYZ at the time)

Challenge of the Yukon is an American radio adventure series that began on Detroit's WXYZ and is an example of a Northern genre story. The series was first heard on January 3, 1939. The title changed from Challenge of the Yukon to Sergeant Preston of the Yukon in September 1950, and that title was retained through the end of the series and into a television adaptation.

== Background ==
Following the success of The Lone Ranger and The Green Hornet on Detroit's WXYZ (now WXYT), the station owner, George W. Trendle, asked for a similar adventure show with a dog as the hero. According to WXYZ staffer Dick Osgood, in his history of the station, Trendle insisted that it not be "a dog like Lassie because... this must be an action story. It had to be a working dog." Writer Tom Dougall, who had been influenced by the poems of Robert W. Service, chose a Husky. The dog was originally called Mogo, but after criticism by Trendle, Dougall re-christened the canine King. Dougall likewise created Sgt. Preston and the French-Canadian guide. Fran Striker, who also wrote for The Lone Ranger, contributed show scripts.

However, Trendle's criticism of Dougall may have had another reason behind it. Shortly before the two Trendle series aired (Lone Ranger and Challenge of the Yukon), popular author Zane Grey had a book in circulation (The Lone Star Ranger) about a Texas Ranger like the Lone Ranger and a comic book series in circulation (King of the Royal Mounted) about the adventures of Sgt. King, a Royal Canadian Mounted Policeman like Sgt. Preston. From 1922 a series of novels by Laurie York Erskine featuring Renfrew of the Royal Mounted warranted enough popularity to begin a radio series of the same title in 1936 and a film series beginning in 1937; the latter featuring a canine sidekick.

Challenge of the Yukon began as a 15-minute serial, airing locally from 1938 until May 28, 1947. Shortly thereafter, the program acquired a sponsor, Quaker Oats, and the series, in a half-hour format, moved to the networks. The program aired on ABC from June 12, 1947, to December 30, 1949. It was then heard on The Mutual Broadcasting System from January 2, 1950, through the final broadcast on June 9, 1955. In September 1950, when the show moved to three broadcasts a week, the title was changed to Sergeant Preston of the Yukon.

== Details ==
The program was an adventure series about Sergeant William Preston of the North-West Mounted Police and his lead sled dog, Yukon King, as they fought evildoers in the Northern wilderness during the Gold Rush of the 1890s. The serial began on radio in 1938 and continued through 1947, after which the series moved to television. The original television program ran from 1947 through 1949 on ABC and was sponsored by Quaker Oats. In January 1951, the radio version was resurrected, running until 1955, when the show moved once again to television as Sergeant Preston of the Yukon. The show starred Richard Simmons.

The theme music was Emil von Reznicek's overture to Donna Diana, an old opera, though the overture remains a concert staple to this day. The show's episodes ended with the official pronouncement, "Well, King, this case is closed."

=== Sgt. Preston ===
Preston, according to radio historian Jim Harmon, first joined the Royal Canadian Mounted Police to capture his father's killer, and when he was successful, he was promoted to sergeant. Preston worked under the command of Inspector Conrad, and in the early years was often assisted by a French-Canadian guide named Pierre. During the course of the series, Preston successfully puts down a rebellion, and captures assassins. Each episode has him battling a new crisis, whether it be tracking down a murderer, a gang of thieves, or claim jumping miners.

=== Yukon King ===
Preston's side-kick and ally (and arguably the true star of the show), was the brave Alaskan husky, Yukon King. Yukon King had a keen instinct for sensing criminals, and was equally valuable dealing with wild animals, once saving a small child from a wolverine. In the radio version, King's barks were usually provided by animal imitators, usually sound effects artist Dewey Cole, and later, actor Ted Johnstone. The radio series supplied King with a back story. As radio historian Jim Harmon recalled, King had been a Husky puppy raised by a mother wolf. When a lynx attacks the wolf and her cub, Sergeant Preston arrives in time to save King. Preston then raised the animal as his own dog team captain. On television, Yukon King was still a vital element, though the dog was now played by an Alaskan Malamute trained by Beverly Allen. The dog received star billing right after Preston, and alongside his horse, Rex. There is some confusion regarding King's actual breed. The writers seemed to use malamute and husky interchangeably. At least once, Preston answered "malamute" to the question from another character. In one radio episode Preston indicates King's mother had been a wolf, which would make him a wolfdog.

== Premise ==
Typical plots involved the pair helping injured trappers, tracking down smugglers, or saving cabin dwellers from wolverines. Sergeant Preston's faithful steed was Rex, used primarily in the summer months, but generally Yukon King and his dog team were the key mode of transportation (as signaled by Preston's cry of "On, King! On, you huskies!)". In the early radio shows, the cry of "On, you huskies!" would alternate with "On, you malamutes" from show to show.

== Radio cast ==
- Sgt. Preston – The part of Sgt. Preston was played by different actors over the course of the long run. Jay Michael, who had often played villain Butch Cavendish on The Lone Ranger, originated the role, and played the brave Mountie from 1939 through the mid-1940s. Former movie actor Paul Sutton took over the role, followed briefly by Brace Beemer when The Lone Ranger ended in 1954. Sutton took over again, however, by the time of the final broadcast.
- Yukon King – The barks, whines, and howls of Yukon King were supplied by one of the station's sound effects men, Dewey Cole, and following Cole's death, by actor Ted Johnstone.
- Narrator and supporting players – The original announcer/narrator was Bob Hite, also a narrator for The Lone Ranger, Green Hornet and The Shadow. Hite was replaced by former star Jay Michael when Sutton took over. Lone Ranger narrator Fred Foy also filled the role from time to time. John Todd was heard occasionally as Inspector Conrad, and Frank Russell played Pierre. Episodic performers came from the same talent pool as the other WXYZ shows.

== Television series: Sergeant Preston of the Yukon ==
In 1955, the same year the radio show ended, Sergeant Preston of the Yukon premiered as a television series. Richard Simmons starred as Sgt. Preston, and was supported by Yukon King and Rex, now played by real animals. The dog cast as King was not a husky, however, but a large purebred Alaskan Malamute. Charles Livingstone, who had worked on the radio version, directed several episodes. Some plot lines were re-used from the radio show, and stories original to the series were generally built upon the same themes. The same few buildings were regularly seen as part of many settlements in the shows. The additional visual component of the snowy Yukon, however, did give the television version a different feel but like all such films when filmed on a stage set, the frosty breath of people in Arctic conditions could not be simulated. Generally, however, there was an outdoor feel though a few times shadows on the skyline could be seen. Genuine outdoor scenes were added to give the show some reality though the viewer could not help but notice a sameness to them as they were all filmed in the same area and reused at times.

Mainly filmed at Ashcroft, Colorado, the series was telecast on CBS from September 29, 1955, to September 25, 1958. The first two seasons were produced by Trendle-Campbell-Meurer, and the show was broadcast in the same time slot as ABC's The Lone Ranger. In its last season, Sergeant Preston of the Yukon was purchased and produced by the Jack Wrather Corporation.

In 1955, the Quaker Oats company gave away land in the Klondike as part of the Klondike Big Inch Land Promotion which was tied in with the television show. Genuine deeds each to one square inch of a lot in Yukon Territory, issued by Klondike Big Inch Land Co. Inc., were inserted into Quaker's Puffed Wheat and Puffed Rice cereal boxes.

Timeless Media Group released a 2-disc best-of set featuring 10 episodes from the series on DVD in Region 1 on November 21, 2006.

Infinity Entertainment has released all 3 seasons of the series on DVD in Region 1.

== Post-TV ==
After filming concluded, the dog, named King, went to live with the family of the president of Jack Wrather Productions after retirement. Wrather had produced the Lassie and Lone Ranger television shows. King eventually was housed on acreage belonging to Texas ex-governor William Carey Graves. King lived to an advanced old age well into the 1960s. He was a loving, obedient, long-discussed pet remembered with much affection.

== Comic books and games ==
From 1951 to 1958 Dell Comics published 29 issues of Sergeant Preston of the Yukon. The first four issues appeared biannually, then quarterly, in the weekly catch-all series Four Color Comics (#344, 373, 397, 419), then assumed its own numbering with issue #5, most often as a quarterly but also bimonthly.

All issues were written by Gaylord Du Bois (creator of Turok) and illustrated by Alberto Giolitti (best known as the longtime illustrator of Turok).

The Dell comic book covers were paintings portraying drama or action, featuring Yukon King and Sergeant Preston in exciting scenes. Once the Sergeant Preston of the Yukon television series premiered, the comic book featured photo covers of the TV series star in character as Sergeant Preston.

There was also a board game, called Sgt. Preston, released by Milton Bradley in 1956.

== Radio episode guide ==
Challenge of the Yukon radio episodes
Airdate	Title
43-07-17	Meeting the Terms of a Contract
43-07-24	Till a Man's Proved Dead
43-07-31	A Swindler Swindled
43-08-14	A Footprint in Leather
43-08-21	Caught by a Button
43-08-28	The Last Days of a Freight Line
43-09-11	A Swill O' Gunpowder
43-09-18	King's Ransom
43-09-25	Murder on Train Time
43-10-02	A Previewed Confession
43-10-09	Attempted Manslaughter
43-10-16	Lantern Rock
43-10-23	The Ring on His Finger
43-10-30	The Tell-Tale Bullet
43-11-06	A Date to Remember
43-11-13	Belated Revenge
43-11-20	Return to the Crime
43-11-27	King Spots Murder
43-12-04	Self Defense or Murder
43-12-11	By Hook or by Crook
43-12-18	The Eleventh Hour
43-12-25	Murder in ABC's
43-12-27	Bob Hite Announces (Audition)
44-01-01	No Escape for a Murderer
44-01-06	Revenge in the Yukon
44-01-13	Forgery and Murder
44-01-20	Macbeth's Bloody Knife
44-01-27	Wolf Pack
44-02-03	Cabin on the Trail
44-02-10	Lady Luck Claim
44-02-17	As a Man Thinketh
44-02-24	The Hannagan Brothers
44-03-02	The Great Dog King
44-03-09	The Vallera Diamond
44-03-23	King Meets Soapy Smith
44-03-30	A Pack of Bacon
44-04-06	Edward Carson
44-04-13	The Plaid Coat
44-04-20	Belle Brady's Gesture
44-04-27	Preston's Right Hand Man
44-05-04	A Woman Scorned
44-05-11	Outlaw Dog
44-05-18	The Outlaw's Nemesis
44-05-25	The Idol
44-06-01	A Joke Led to the Gallows
44-06-08	Reverend Jim
44-06-15	The Man from Missouri
44-06-22	Design for Murder aka Killing Sullivan
44-06-29	The Duke Bows to a King
44-07-13	The Lady's Locket
44-07-20	Lucky Walters
44-07-27	Of Dogs and Horses
44-08-03	Maintiens Le Droit
44-08-10	The Plan That Failed
44-08-17	King Breaks the Wheel of Fortune
44-08-24	A Rendezvous
44-08-31	Smokey
44-09-07	A Frame-Up That Failed
44-09-14	Death and the Flickering Eye
44-09-21	A Masquerade
44-09-28	Eyes for the Blind
44-10-12	King Saves the Day
44-10-19	Suzanne Verrill
44-10-26	Case History of a Mountie
44-11-02	Seahorse City's Editor
44-11-09	King Found the Clue
44-11-16	Florabelle's Adventure
44-11-23	Paula Buchanan
44-11-30	King Meets a Grizzly
44-12-07	Trial by Fire
44-12-14	One Went to the Gallows
44-12-21	How Connelly Paid the Law
44-12-28	Preston's Dilemma
45-01-04	Trap for a Mountie
45-01-13	Manhunt
45-01-18	Murder on the Trail
45-01-25	The Fugitives
45-01-30	King Led the Way
45-02-06	An Unlucky Gambler
45-02-13	Guilty by Proxy
45-02-20	Wilderness Girl
45-02-27	Glynns Canyon
45-03-06	Trail Scent
45-03-13	The Dog-Head Nugget
45-03-20	Silver Point Renegades
45-03-27	Landslide
45-04-03	Blizzard in the Yukon
45-04-10	Back Door of the Mountain
45-04-24	Her Weight in Gold
45-05-01	Spawn of the North
45-05-08	The Dog Team Race
45-05-15	God of the Mountain
45-05-22	A Boy and a Dog
45-05-29	Ambush
45-06-05	Trap Robber
45-06-12	Medicine Man
45-06-19	Thunder
45-06-26	Recovered Claim
45-07-03	Old Tom
45-07-10	The Brass Button
45-07-17	Escape
45-07-24	Skipper
45-07-31	The Chase
45-08-07	The Map
45-08-14	Arctic Chase
45-08-21	Maw Baker's Pies
45-08-28	Magnanimous Ghost
45-09-04	Bear Trap
45-09-11	Alibi
45-09-18	Big Bill
45-09-25	The Red Mitten
45-10-02	Chechako
45-10-09	The Black Bear
45-10-16	Scorpion Sam's Gold
45-10-23	Dynamite Provides
45-10-30	The Trail
45-11-06	The Last Laugh
45-11-13	The Irish Wolf Hound
45-11-20	Father Donovan
45-11-27	Long Fall Canyon
45-12-04	The Bonanza Belle
45-12-11	The Dachshund
45-12-18	Christmas Present
45-12-29	New Year's Eve
46-01-05	The Grave Robbers
46-01-10	The Mail Team
46-01-17	Preston Takes Over
46-01-24	Jane Gets Her Man
46-01-31	The Blind Man
46-02-14	The Cure
46-02-21	Mabel
46-02-28	The Shamaness
46-03-07	Mad Wolf
46-03-14	The Bully
46-03-21	Hold Up
46-03-28	The Rivals
46-04-04	The Return of Pete Hunt
46-04-11	Ned's Wife
46-04-18	Rex
46-04-25	Torn Parka
46-05-02	Balmy Bill
46-05-09	Eskimo Justice
46-05-16	Shrimp Togan
46-05-23	Chap
46-05-30	The Mitten
46-06-06	Annie Jones
46-06-13	The Great Dane
46-06-20	How Preston Got King
46-06-27	The Sharp Shooter
46-07-04	The Pup That Ate Too Much
46-07-11	Flash
46-07-18	Preston Breaks a Rule
46-07-25	Beaver Dam
46-08-01	The Silver Fox
46-08-15	The Mute Speaks
46-08-22	Grizzly Martin
46-08-29	Preston Goes to Jail
46-09-12	The Epidemic
46-09-19	Preston Sells King
46-09-26	Blind Man's Claim
46-10-03	The Wooden Case
46-11-07	Trap in the Mountains
46-11-14	The Choice
46-11-21	The Cat Collar
46-11-28	Thanksgiving in the Wilderness
46-12-05	The Watch Dog
46-12-12	The Dog Fight
46-12-19	Christmas Present
46-12-26	The Man Who Limped
47-01-02	The False Beard
47-01-09	Zeb
47-01-16	The Black Dog
47-01-23	A Question of Ethics
47-01-30	The Gold Fang
47-02-04	Pet Bear
47-02-11	The Substitution
47-02-20	The Red Parka
47-02-27	The Hermit of Nugget Hill
47-03-06	The Coffin
47-03-12	Sunshine Stones
47-03-19	The Birthday Present
47-03-26	The Big Stone House
47-04-02	The Dancing Bear
47-04-09	The Story of Big John
47-04-16	The Torn Sleeve
47-04-23	The Mad Trapper
47-04-30	The Red Setter
47-05-14	The Usurpers
47-05-28	Lost Mitten
47-06-12	The Wolf Cub
47-06-19	Grizzly
47-06-26	Pet Bear
47-07-03	The Puppy
47-07-12	Sam's Gold
47-07-19	The Man in the Fur Cap
47-07-26	A Dog Named Mabel
47-08-02	Messenger of Mercy
47-08-09	Derelict Dog
47-08-23	The Revenge of Steve Carlton
47-08-30	Clue to a Killer
47-09-06	The Stolen Pups
47-09-11	The Northern Pursuit
47-09-18	The Fraud
47-09-25	Reprisal
47-10-02	The Proof
47-10-09	The Malamute Pup
47-10-16	The Last Cabin
47-10-23	Rex
47-11-01	Sam's Wife
47-11-08	King's Escape
47-11-15	The Limping Dog
47-11-22	King Gets His Man aka The Piano
47-11-29	Tara
47-12-06	The Marked Cards
47-12-13	White Man's Law
47-12-27	The Shepherd Dog
48-01-03	The Silent One
48-01-10	Tago, the Half Breed
48-01-17	The Bridge
48-01-24	The Loyalty of Chief
48-01-31	The Pamphlet
48-02-07	The Red Herring
48-02-14	The Klondike Palace
48-02-21	Aunt Em
48-02-28	Silvertip
48-03-06	The Debt
48-03-13	Witness for the Crown
48-03-20	King Comes Home
48-03-27	The Wire Haired Terrier
48-04-24	Rusty
48-06-26	Breakup
48-09-06	Shots in the Dark
48-09-08	Winner by Proxy
48-09-13	The Fraud
48-09-15	Trader Muldoon
48-09-17	The Showdown
48-09-20	Lost Indian Mine
48-09-22	Icebound
48-09-24	Old Ben's Gold
48-09-27	Pot Luck Killers
48-09-29	Ghost Town
48-10-01	Find the Body
48-10-04	The Extra Uniform
48-10-06	Record Run
48-10-08	Parson Shorty Meadows
48-10-11	The Red Ace
48-10-13	Mine of Good Hope
48-10-15	White Hawk
48-10-18	Underground Ambush
48-10-20	The False Trail
48-10-22	The Poisoner of Chiliwaw
48-10-25	Samaritan of the Trail
48-10-27	Preston Turns the Tables
48-10-29	The Phantom Gang
48-11-01	The Call of Duty
48-11-03	The Man with the Red Hair
48-11-05	Death on the Trail
48-11-08	The Wilderness Uprising
48-11-10	Ben Yancy's Legacy
48-11-12	Shadow
48-11-15	The Second Chance
48-11-17	Manhunt
48-11-19	The St Bernard Dog
48-11-22	Mutiny on the Penguin
48-11-24	Old Moby's Cairn
48-11-26	Lost River Roundup
48-11-29	Strike at Pelican Creek
48-12-01	The Black Husky
48-12-03	The Sergeant's Right
48-12-06	Timber
48-12-08	The Dawson Fire
48-12-10	The Trap in Cabin Four
48-12-13	Escape to the North
48-12-15	Marlow's Gang
48-12-17	Faith in a Mountie
48-12-20	The Emerald in the Nugget
48-12-22	The Man with the Red Coat
48-12-27	Injun Devil
48-12-29	Arrowhead Frame-Up
48-12-31	Case of Frank Weaver
49-01-03	King Takes Over
49-01-07	Jim Belden's Secret
49-01-10	King Proves His Worth
49-01-14	Lem Bailey's Pet Bear
49-01-17	White Water
49-01-19	Jimmy's Birthday Cake
49-01-21	Skagway Patrol

Challenge of the Yukon radio episodes, continued
Airdate	Title
49-01-24	Mystery in the Cave
49-01-26	The Moose River Murder
49-01-28	Lost River Ambush
49-01-31	The Mongrel
49-02-02	On One Condition
49-02-04	The Trail of Grizzly Grayson
49-02-07	Rogue's Progress
49-02-09	Sergeant Preston Faces Death
49-02-11	Ambush
49-02-14	The Coward
49-02-16	Double Cross Creek
49-02-18	The Dog with the Gold Tooth
49-02-21	The Magic Light
49-02-23	Signal in Green
49-02-25	Danger Signal
49-02-28	River Pirates
49-03-02	Ambush at Forty Mile
49-03-04	The Music Hall Murder
49-03-07	Trail Mates
49-03-09	Bulldog Charm
49-03-11	The Meal the Convicted
49-03-14	The White Huskie
49-03-16	The Kondike Queen
49-03-18	The Caribou Case
49-03-21	The Black and White Pup
49-03-23	The Devil Dog
49-03-25	Letters to a Killer
49-03-28	Conover's Crime
49-03-30	Crumpled Handbill
49-04-01	The Killer
49-04-04	The Remittance Man
49-04-06	Dead Man's Map
49-04-08	The Knife Throwers
49-04-11	The Lucky Shirt
49-04-13	The Trail of the Werewolf
49-04-15	Trouble at Forty-Mile
49-04-18	The Luck of the Newtons
49-04-20	The Empty Coffin
49-04-22	The Doomed Witness
49-04-25	The Bear Trap
49-04-27	The Perfect Crime
49-04-29	Fire in the Sky
49-05-02	Escape to the North
49-05-04	The Sparrow
49-05-06	The Case of the Hard-Hearted Hermit
49-05-09	Race to Twenty Mile
49-05-11	The Million Dollar Deadline
49-05-13	The Skagway-Mail
49-05-16	The Counter Plan
49-05-18	The Bad Penny
49-05-20	Adventure in Selkirk
49-05-23	The Duel
49-05-25	Death and the Lucky Seven
49-05-27	The Skull in the Stone
49-05-30	The Case of the Turncoat Mountie
49-06-01	The Case of the Frightened Child
49-06-03	The Case of the Canyon Holdup
49-06-06	The Missing Code
49-06-08	The Case of the Yellow Ribbon
49-06-10	A Boy and His Dog
49-06-15	The Uphill Sled
49-06-22	King Takes Over
49-06-29	The Case of the Beautiful Swindler
49-07-06	The Case of the Crown Fire
49-07-13	Trickery in the River
49-07-20	The Case of the Kind Hearted Killer
49-07-27	The Case of the Unwilling Guardian
49-08-03	The Renegade Huskie
49-08-10	What Price King
49-08-17	The Case of the Friendly Enemies
49-08-24	The Yellow Kitten
49-08-31	The Minister's Missing Money
49-09-07	The Case of the Detective Who; Liked Excitement
49-09-12	The Fan-Tan Gold Robbery
49-09-14	The Boy Who Feared Dogs
49-09-16	The Case of the Wishbone
49-09-19	Fire on the Trail
49-09-21	King and the Baxter Gang
49-09-23	The Case of the River Pirates
49-09-26	Ambush Near Selkirk
49-09-28	The Case of the Sourdough's Dog
49-09-30	The Phantom Witness
49-10-03	The Scent of Blood
49-10-05	Murder on the Mountain
49-10-07	The Generous Hobo
49-10-10	Allen McRae's Birthday Present
49-10-12	The Burning Cabin
49-10-14	The Great Charlotta
49-10-17	The Doctor Disappears
49-10-19	Hazel Crest Decision
49-10-21	Rescue in the Forest
49-10-24	The Missing Money
49-10-26	Bad Boy
49-10-28	The Last Will
49-10-31	Nipper Moves Himself
49-11-02	Bear Trap
49-11-04	Dr Blake's Surrender
49-11-09	The Miser and the Mob
49-11-11	The Old Timer
49-11-14	The Senator Finds a Treasure
49-11-16	Note of Evidence
49-11-18	The Brothers' Promise
49-11-21	The King Emperor
49-11-23	The Stolen Box
49-11-25	The Barbary Gang
49-11-28	Grubstake for Vickers
49-11-30	48 Hours to Pay
49-12-02	Outlaw's Twin
49-12-05	Dance at Caribou Creek
49-12-07	The Return of Tom Becket
49-12-09	Swindlers Luck
49-12-12	Copper Gulch Patrol
49-12-14	The Wainwright Cache
49-12-16	The Black Bag
49-12-19	Missing Gold
49-12-21	The Shanghaied Sergeant
49-12-23	The Sergeant's Present
49-12-26	Journey for Revenge
49-12-28	Swindler's Luck
49-12-30	The Prodigal Father
50-01-02	Rainbow's End
50-01-04	Jeff Marco's Gang
50-01-06	The Battle at Bradley's
50-01-09	Barry Jeffer's Trust
50-01-11	Red Devil
50-01-13	The Miners' Meeting
50-01-16	The Diamond Collar
50-01-18	The Long Trail
50-01-20	No Epitaph for Tombstone
50-01-23	The Ten Thousand Dollar Rewards
50-01-25	The Trap That Failed
50-01-27	The Ghost Raider
50-01-30	Casper Mott's Adventure
50-02-01	Circumstantial Evidence
50-02-03	Blind Man's Buff
50-02-06	Jailbreak
50-02-08	The Runaway Heir
50-02-10	Flaming Valley
50-02-13	The Haunted Mine
50-02-15	The Black Cat
50-02-17	Alias Al Gibson
50-02-20	The Murdered Witness
50-02-22	Trail's End
50-02-24	Uncle Joe's Luck
50-02-27	Guardian for Jimmy
50-03-01	When Thief Catches Thief
50-03-03	The Innocent Criminal
50-03-06	Wolf Creek
50-03-08	Restitution
50-03-10	The Lost Lady
50-03-13	Hidden Evidence
50-03-15	Secret Orders
50-03-17	The Man Who Fled
50-03-20	The Cascade Case
50-03-22	The Fugitive Bride
50-03-24	The Wolf Cub
50-03-27	Canyon Cache
50-03-29	Mystery of the Ridge
50-03-31	Twenty Little Indians
50-04-03	Unfinished Note
50-04-05	The Two Bullets
50-05-26	Wand Diamond
50-05-29	Notorious Chet Craig
50-05-31	The Dead Man's Trail
50-06-02	The Angel of Death
50-06-05	Six Gun Clue
50-06-07	Jose's Return
50-06-09	Revenge from Beyond
50-06-28	The Bag of Gold
50-07-07	Race of the River Boats
50-07-10	The Diamond Solitaire
50-07-19	Stolen Gold
50-07-26	The Spread Eagle Raid
50-08-02	The Beaverton Legacy
50-08-09	A Change of Mind
50-08-16	Ten Thousand Counterfeit
50-08-23	The Branded Pelts
50-08-30	Logan's Luck
50-09-06	Cal Dorset's Heir
50-09-11	The Gold Behind the Waterfall
50-09-13	The Polar Quest
50-09-15	Left to Die
50-09-18	The Sack of Sand
50-09-20	The Malemute Express
50-09-22	The Torn Map
50-09-25	Diagram of Danger
50-09-27	The Red Raiders
50-09-29	Dog Crazy
50-10-02	The Malacca Cane
50-10-04	The Vagabond
50-10-06	The Criminal Collie
50-10-09	The Blue Paper
50-10-11	Harper's Castle
50-10-13	A Dog Called Sparky
50-10-16	Fugitive from Bald Rock
50-10-18	The Masked Gunman
50-10-20	Out of the Night
50-10-23	Heart of a Killer
50-10-25	Dead Man's Whistle
50-10-27	A Call to Action
50-10-30	Undercover
50-11-01	Contention
50-11-03	Whistling in the Dark
50-11-06	Friend in Need
50-11-08	The Ghost Riders
50-11-13	The Clue of the Silver Pup
50-11-15	Passport to Death
50-11-17	The Telltale Knife
50-11-20	The Wrong Map
50-11-22	The Rebel Yell
50-11-24	Death Waits on the River
50-11-27	The Man in the Canyon
50-11-29	Gold Fever
50-12-01	Spider Burke's Daughter
50-12-04	Wild Dog
50-12-06	The Indian Sign
50-12-08	The Notorious Hawk Cooper
51-01-20	Danger at Devil's Gorge
51-01-27	Murder on Fox Run
51-01-28	Escape by Night
51-02-03	White Fox for Marie
51-02-04	Storm the Pass
51-02-10	The King of Keeno Creek
51-02-11	The Trail Robbers
51-02-17	Wrong Trail
51-02-18	Honest Young Man
51-02-24	Blackmailer's Payoff
51-02-25	Vanished Loot
51-03-03	Job for Jim Lackey
51-03-04	The Russian Rubies
51-03-10	Secret of the Closed Room
51-03-11	Doctor Redcoat
51-03-17	The Third Strike
51-03-18	Never Be Missed
51-03-24	The Counterfeit Heiress
51-03-25	Old Faithful
51-03-31	Cabin 102
51-04-01	The Blue Scarf
51-04-07	Trapper's Trail
51-04-08	Take It Easy
51-04-14	The Blind Husky
51-04-15	Team-Mates
51-04-21	Rowdy's Choice
51-04-22	Indian Dream
51-06-10	Number One Challenger
51-07-01	The Stuffed Shirt
51-07-08	Murder at the Flood
51-07-12	A Boy Called Jack
51-07-15	Thieves' Congress
51-07-19	Tom Barry's Return
51-07-22	The Trail's End
51-07-26	The Innocent Fugitives
51-08-02	And Far Away
51-08-05	The Widow's Son
51-08-09	The Man Who Feared Dogs
51-08-12	Ambush in Bellary Flats
51-08-16	Against Time
51-08-19	The Red Parka
51-08-23	The Scent of Death
51-08-26	Bullets for Preston
51-08-30	Red Coated Crook
51-09-02	Boy Alone
51-09-06	Junior Partner
51-09-09	Dividend on Murder
51-09-13	The Landlady
51-09-16	The Killer Cree
51-09-20	Chance Meeting
51-09-23	Trapper's Gold
51-09-27	Uncle Ben
51-10-04	Open and Shut
51-10-07	Fire in the Forest
51-10-09	Man in Hiding
51-10-11	Double Identity
51-10-21	The Mutiny's Survivor
51-10-25	Claim 22
51-10-30	Reward for Shiloh
51-11-01	Trail to Trouble
51-11-04	The Diamond Solitaire
51-11-13	Sneak Gun
52-09-07	Murder on the Mountain
53-02-19	The Queen's Parlor
53-03-05	SOS from Panamint
53-10-29	The Death Dart
53-11-03	The Rag Doll
55-01-06	Outlaw in Uniform

== See also ==
- Old-time radio

== Sources ==
- Dunning, John (1998). On the Air: The Encyclopedia of Old-Time Radio. New York: Oxford University Press. ISBN 0-19-507678-8
- Harmon, Jim (1967). The Great Radio Heroes. New York: Doubleday and Company.
- Ohmart, Ben (2002). It's That Time Again. Albany: BearManor Media. ISBN 0-9714570-2-6
