= Laird =

Style that applies to an owner of a Scottish estate

Laird (/ˈlɛərd/) is a Scottish word for minor lord (or landlord) and is a designation that applies to an owner of a large, long-established Scottish estate. In the traditional Scottish order of precedence, a laird ranked below a baron and above a gentleman. This rank was held only by those holding official recognition in a territorial designation by the Lord Lyon King of Arms. They are usually styled [name] [surname] of [lairdship]. However, since "laird" is a courtesy title, it has no formal status in law.

Historically, the term bonnet laird was applied to rural, petty landowners, as they wore a bonnet like the non-landowning classes. Bonnet lairds filled a position in society below lairds and above husbandmen (farmers), similar to the yeomen of England.

An Internet fad is the selling of tiny souvenir plots of Scottish land and a claim of a "laird" title to go along with it, but the Lord Lyon has decreed these meaningless for several reasons.

== Etymology ==
Laird (earlier lard) is the now-standard Scots pronunciation (and phonetic spelling) of the word that is pronounced and spelled in standard English as lord. As can be seen in the Middle English version of Chaucer's Canterbury Tales, specifically in the Reeve's Tale, Northern Middle English had a where Southern Middle English had o, a difference still found in standard English two and Scots twa.

The Scots and Northern English dialectal variant laird has been recorded in writing since the 13th century, as a surname, and in its modern context since the middle of the 15th century. It is derived from the Northern Middle English laverd, itself derived from the Old English word hlafweard meaning "warden of loaves". The Standard English variant, lord, is of the same origin, and would have formerly been interchangeable with laird; however, in modern usage the term lord is associated with a peerage title, and thus the terms have come to have separate meanings. (In Scotland, the title baron is not a peerage; the equivalent of an English baron is a Lord of Parliament, e.g. Lord Lovat.)

== History and definition ==
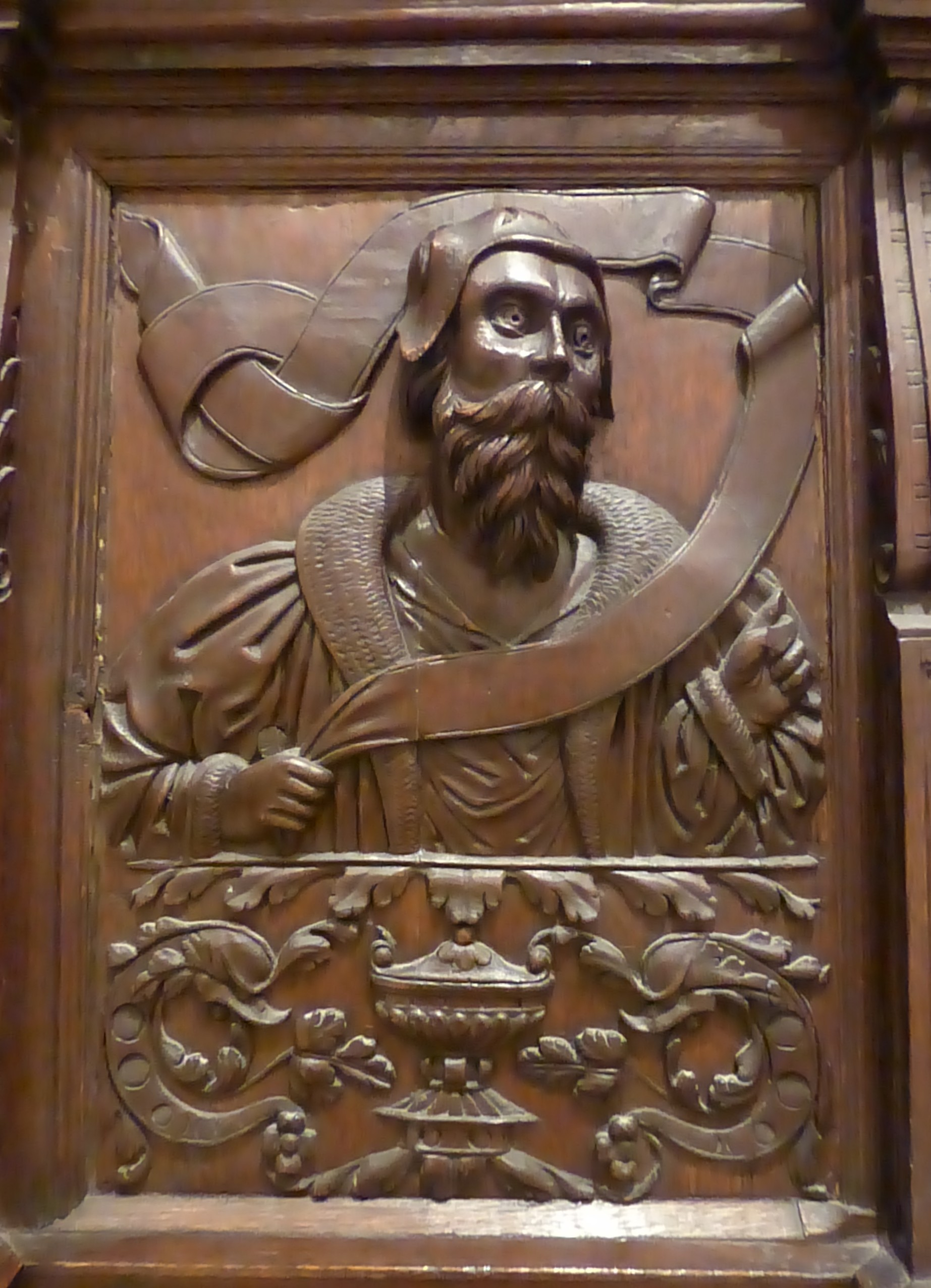
Carving believed to depict a 16th-century Scottish laird

In the 15th and 16th centuries, the designation was used for land owners holding directly of the Crown, and therefore were entitled to attend Parliament. Lairds reigned over their estates like princes, their castles forming a small court. Originally in the 16th and 17th centuries, the designation was applied to the head chief of a highland clan and therefore was not personal property and had obligations towards the community.

The laird might possess certain local or feudal rights. A lairdship carried voting rights in the ancient pre-Union Parliament of Scotland, although such voting rights were expressed via two representatives from each county who were known as commissioners of the shires, who came from the minor noble class (including lairds) and were chosen by their peers to represent them. A certain level of landownership was a necessary qualification (40 shillings of old extent). A laird is said to hold a lairdship. A woman who holds a lairdship in her own right has been styled with the honorific "Lady".

Although "laird" is sometimes translated as lord and historically signifies the same, like the English term lord of the manor, laird is not a title of nobility. The designation is a "corporeal hereditament" (an inheritable property that has an explicit tie to the physical land), i.e. the designation cannot be held in gross, and cannot be bought and sold without selling the physical land. The designation does not entitle the owner to sit in the House of Lords, and is the Scottish equivalent to an English squire, in that it is not a noble title, more a courtesy designation meaning landowner with no other rights assigned to it. A person can be recognised as a laird, if not a chief or chieftain, or descendant of one of these, by the formal recognition of a territorial designation as a part of their name by the Lord Lyon. The Lord Lyon is the ultimate arbiter as to determining entitlement to a territorial designation, and his right of discretion in recognising these, and their status as a name, dignity or title, have been confirmed in the Scottish courts.

=== Today ===
The Laird, a figurine by Royal Doulton

A study in 2003 by academics at the Universities of Edinburgh and Aberdeen concluded that:

The modern Scottish Highland sporting estate continues to be a place owned by an absentee landowner who uses its 15-20,000 acres for hunting and family holidays. While tolerating public access, he (82% of lairds are male) feels threatened by new legislation, and believes that canoeing and mountain-biking should not take place on his estate at all.

== Traditional and current forms of address ==
The use of the honorific "The Much Honoured" by lairds is archaic, although technically correct.

The wife of a laird may be accorded the courtesy title Lady; King George V and his wife Queen Mary were reported as being "The Laird and Lady of Balmoral" by the Scottish press in the 1920s and 1930s. In the UK television series Monarch of the Glen (based on the 1941 novel by Compton Mackenzie), the wife of "Hector Naismith MacDonald, Laird of Glenbogle" is referenced as "Lady of Glenbogle".

== Souvenir plots and false titles ==
A contemporary popular view of lairdship titles has taken a unique twist in the 21st century with sales of souvenir plots from sellers who obtain no legal right to the title. A souvenir plot is defined in the Land Registration (Scotland) Act 2012 as "a piece of land ... of inconsiderable size or no practical utility". Several websites, and Internet vendors on websites like eBay, sell Scottish lairdships along with minuscule "plots of land" – usually one square foot. The Court of the Lord Lyon considers these particular titles to be meaningless because it is impossible to have numerous "lairds" of a single estate at the same time, as has been advertised by these companies.

However, despite the law and guidance by the Court of the Lord Lyon, the sellers view the contract purporting to sell a plot of Scottish souvenir land as bestowing the buyer with the informal right to the title of Laird. This is despite the fact that the buyer does not acquire ownership of the plot because registration of the plot is prohibited by Land Registration (Scotland) Act 2012, s 22 (1)(b). As ownership of land in Scotland requires registration of a valid disposition under Land Registration (Scotland) Act 2012, s 50 (2), the prohibition on registration of a souvenir plot means the buyer does not acquire ownership, and accordingly has no entitlement to a descriptive title premised on landownership.

The Lord Lyon, Scotland's authority on titles and heraldry, has produced the following guidance regarding the current concept of a "souvenir plot" and the use of the term "laird" as a courtesy title:

The term "laird" has generally been applied to the owner of an estate, sometimes by the owner himself or, more commonly, by those living and working on the estate. It is a description rather than a title, and is not appropriate for the owner of a normal residential property, far less the owner of a small souvenir plot of land. The term "laird" is not synonymous with that of "lord" or "lady".

Ownership of a souvenir plot of land is not sufficient to bring a person otherwise ineligible within the jurisdiction of the Lord Lyon for the purpose of seeking a grant of arms.

== See also ==
- Forms of address in the United Kingdom
- Laird (surname)
- Baronage of Scotland
