= Klondike Big Inch Land Promotion =

American breakfast food promotion

Klondike Big Inch Land Promotion Certificate

The Klondike Big Inch Land promotion was a marketing promotion run by the Quaker Oats Company in 1955 and created by Bruce Baker, a Chicago advertising executive.

== Inception ==
Quaker Oats bought 19.11 acres (7.73 ha) of land in the Yukon Territory of Canada for the price of US$1000 and printed up 21 million deeds for one square inch (6.5 cm^{2}) of land. The lot, noted on the certificates by its legal description of Lot 243, Group 2, Plan 6718, was located the Yukon River across from Dawson City at 64.030°N 139.503°W. On advice of counsel, Quaker Oats set up and transferred the land to the Great Klondike Big Inch Land Company to make the company the registered owner and manager of the deeds.

Starting in January 1955, 93 newspapers across the United States ran advertisements that read "Get a real deed to one square inch of land in the Yukon gold rush country" and "You'll actually own one square inch of Yukon land". The promotion was tied to the Sergeant Preston of the Yukon television show which was sponsored by Quaker Oats and set in Yukon during the 1890s Klondike Gold Rush.

== Obtaining deeds ==
The promotion instructed people to mail a form along with a box top from either Quaker Puffed Wheat, Quaker Puffed Rice or Muffets Shredded Wheat to the Quaker Oats company. In turn, a 5-by-8-inch (13 by 20 cm) deed to one square inch of land in the Klondike was sent back. In February 1955, Quaker Oats was blocked from trading the deed for a box top by the Ohio Securities Division until it received a state license for the "sale" of foreign land. To get around the injunction, the company stopped the trade-in offer and instead put one of the deeds in each box of cereal produced.

Since none of the deeds were actually registered, the documents were never legally binding and owners of these deeds were never actual owners of any land. The deed excluded mineral rights on the property.

== Afterwards ==
Due to $37.20 in back taxes, the land was repossessed by the Canadian government in 1965, and the Great Klondike Big Inch Land Company dissolved in 1966. The land is now adjacent to the Dawson City Golf Course.

To this day, Yukon officials receive letters and phone calls about the deeds. The land office of the Yukon currently contains an 18-inch-thick (46 cm) file folder of correspondence regarding the promotion.

== See also ==
- Challenge of the Yukon, the radio show tied to the Klondike Big Inch Land promotion
- Dawson City, the city the land is situated on.
- Souvenir plot
