= C14H12O2 =

The molecular formula C_{14}H_{12}O_{2} (molar mass : 212.24 g/mol, exact mass: 212.08373 u) may refer to:

- Benzoin
- Benzyl benzoate
- Diphenylacetic acid
- Felbinac, a medicine
- 1-Keto-1,2,3,4-tetrahydrophenanthrene, a syntethic estrogen
- Pinosylvin, a stilbenoid
- 3,4'-Dihydroxystilbene, a stilbenoid
- Stilbestrol, a stilbenoid
