= Emil von Reznicek =

Austrian composer (1860–1945)

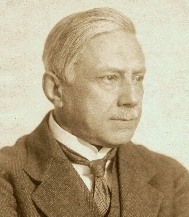
Emil Nikolaus von Reznicek

Emil Nikolaus Joseph, Freiherr von Reznicek (4 May 1860, in Vienna – 2 August 1945, in Berlin) was an Austrian composer of Romanian-Czech ancestry.

== Life ==
Reznicek's grandfather, Josef Resnitschek (1787–1848), was a trumpet virtuoso and band leader in the Imperial regiments Nos. 32 (Esterhazy), based in Budapest, and 60 (Gustav Wasa), based in Vienna where he played music with Johann Strauss Sr. and Joseph Lanner. Reznicek's father Josef Resnitschek/Reznicek (1812–1887) entered the army as a cadet and eventually became Feldmarschall-Lieutenant, the second-highest rank in the Austrian army, gaining an ordinary diploma of nobility in 1851 and the rank as a Baron (Freiherr) in 1859. His mother, Clarisse Fürstin Ghika Budești (1837–1864), belonged to the influential Ghika family of Romania. Emil Nikolaus was the half-brother of the artist Ferdinand von Řezníček (1868–1909).

Reznicek passed his childhood in Vienna, until the family moved to Graz in 1874. He began piano lessons in 1871; his first compositions date from 1876–78, when he was a student in Graz and at the Staatsgymnasium in Marburg an der Drau (Maribor). He studied law and music in Graz from 1878–80. He never finished his law degree, but continued to study music with Wilhelm Mayer (also known as W. A. Rémy). Finally, he went to Leipzig to study with Carl Reinecke and Salomon Jadassohn. He gained his diploma as a composer on 9 June 1882, not long after he and his wife Mathilde's (née Thurn-Valsassina) first son Ludwig Emil Franz was born on 26 May 1882.

Subsequently, he honed his conducting skills through apprenticeships at various theaters in Graz, Zürich, Stettin, Jena, Bochum, Berlin, and Mainz.[2] In 1886, he obtained a position at the Neues Deutsches Landestheater in Prague. Reznicek's first son, Ludwig Emil Franz, died the following year in 1888. And the next year, Reznicek's third son, Eugen Arthur Emmerich, was born to Mathilde on 12 August 1889. Reznicek's career in Prague continued with his appointment as Kapellmeister of the 88th Infantry in 1890,[3] a role he held until his dismissal in 1892 following a duel. Despite this setback, he achieved his greatest success up to that point with the premiere of Donna Diana on 16 December 1894, a triumph that significantly advanced his conducting career. He later contended for the succession of Eduard Lassen at Weimar and subsequently served as Hofkapellmeister at Mannheim from 1896 to 1899. During this time of setback and great achievement, Emil's wife Mathilde became seriously ill, and subsequently died on 6 July 1897. Additionally, Reznicek became involved romantically with a married woman, Bertha Meyer (née Juillerat-Chasseur), wife to Edgar Meyer since 8 March 1892. Bertha had one son during this marriage, Burghard Edgar Martin Artur, born on 29 October 1896. Reznicek's fourth son Emil Ludwig Karl was born on 18 August 1898, conceived while Bertha was still entwined with Edgar; there was such political scandal due to the situation, the family moved from Mannheim.

Reznicek married Bertha Meyer on 18 July 1899, and from 1899 to 1902 the couple settled at Wiesbaden, where Reznicek wrote his fifth opera Till Eulenspiegel, which premiered in 1902 at Karlsruhe under the direction of Felix Mottl. In the autumn of 1902, Reznicek moved to Charlottenburg, then a wealthy suburb of Berlin, where he remained for most of his life. It was here in Charlottenburg that Reznicek and his wife Bertha's daughter, Jutta Felicitas Amalie, was born on 18 January 1904.

In Berlin, Reznicek enjoyed a good start with the premiere of his first symphony and a revival of Till Eulenspiegel at the Court-opera. But he subsequently distanced himself from the circle of Emperor Wilhelm II. In 1905 he composed some songs with obvious left-wing tendencies. For economic reasons, he was forced to accept the position of chief conductor of the Warsaw Philharmonic Orchestra (1906–08) and Warsaw Opera (1907/08), where he introduced Salome by Richard Strauss and Die Meistersinger von Nürnberg by Richard Wagner. From 1909 to 1911, Reznicek assumed the position of chief conductor at Hans Gregor's Komische Oper an der Weidendammbrücke at Berlin (not related to the modern Komische Oper of Berlin). Today, Gregor is considered to be the founder of modern Regietheater; Reznicek's experience there registers in his operas beginning with Ritter Blaubart (1915–1917). Gregor closed his enterprise upon becoming Intendant at the Court Opera in Vienna in 1911. This proved to be a decisive year for Reznicek personally as well. His wife Berta fell seriously ill and was in critical condition for a month; his autobiography of 1940 indicates that he seriously considered suicide at the time. Instead, he channeled his feelings into the confessional tone poem Schlemihl (1912). Schlemihl met with immediate success and launched a new phase in Reznicek's career as a composer, becoming the first installment of a trilogy that also included Der Sieger (1913) and Frieden - Eine Vision (1914). In 1914–15 he wrote In memoriam, a requiem for the fallen soldiers of all nations. In 1915/16 came his next opera, Ritter Blaubart, which, due to wartime censorship, did not premiere at Darmstadt until 1920. With the Weimar Republic came public recognition: Reznicek was nominated for a professorship at the Hochschule für Musik in Berlin and for a seat in the Prussian Academy of Fine Arts. Reznicek himself responded with a continuous flow of new music until the spring of 1935.

The rise of the Nazi Party in 1933, however, brought new and complex challenges. While Reznicek himself was not interested in politics, his wife Bertha's Jewish roots (though raised Calvinist) became a dangerous liability under the new regime. This was not Reznicek’s first encounter with the complexities of Jewish identity within his own family. His adopted son, Burghard Edgar Martin Artur (born Meyer), was persecuted for his extended family's Jewish roots, escaping for a time to New York City. Also, Reznicek's son Eugen, a military officer, was asked to leave Germany in 1941 for non-alignment with the NSDAP (Nationalsozialistische Deutsche Arbeiterpartei), or Nazi Party. As soon as was convenient, Eugen and his wife, and two daughters returned to Vienna. Meanwhile, Reznicek's daughter Felicitas (1904–1997) attempted to leave Germany for Switzerland, but was denied a work permit. She remained in Berlin and joined the resistance movement in 1934, later working with British intelligence. Back in Germany, the threat to Bertha was immediate; the family faced blackmail, and Bertha, driven to despair, nearly committed suicide. She withdrew from public life and died of a heart attack in 1939. Amidst these personal and political upheavals, in 1934 Reznicek accepted Strauss's invitation to become the German delegate at the Ständige Rat für die Internationale Zusammenarbeit der Komponisten. Contrary to the opinion promulgated by Ernst Krenek, this was not a Nazi organization but an invention of Richard Strauss tolerated by the Nazi propaganda. With some restrictions, the Rat operated rather independently (at least up to 1941), organizing festivals and concerts with modern music in all its member states. Reznicek organized these concerts in Germany and in due course he was able to present compositions which were not particularly in-line with the Nazi-ideology (e.g., the music of Jewish composers such as Dukas and Wladigeroff or jazz-inspired works like The Rio Grande by Constant Lambert). When the Nazi party tightened the grip on the Rat in 1942, Reznicek tried to resist and eventually resigned. Already in 1940 he had raised some suspicion at the Reich Ministry of Public Enlightenment and Propaganda with his autobiography, which was destined for publication but prohibited by censorship. During his final years, the performance of his works in Germany diminished considerably. In 1943, he was evacuated from Berlin to Baden, Lower Austria. There he suffered a stroke on Christmas Day 1943, from which he never fully recovered. Becoming increasingly demented, he was allowed to return to Berlin in February 1945. He died from typhoid fever and starvation on 2 August 1945 during the epidemic ravaging most of Berlin. He was buried in the first coffin sold in Berlin after the war, and the pall bearers removed their suits, socks, and shoes for security reasons suggested by the Soviet major at the border of east and west Berlin.[5][6] Reznicek was a friend of Richard Strauss, but relations between the two were ambivalent. Reznicek's symphonic poem Schlemihl (1912) has been seen as a parody of Strauss' A Hero's Life, though in his autobiography Reznicek rejected this interpretation. By his own account, his greatest influence was, in fact, Gustav Mahler. Sardonic humor features in much of Reznicek's music, from the prankster Till Eulenspiegel and the jibbering Blaubart of Ritter Blaubart to the Dance around the Golden Calf in Der Sieger and the expressionist Tarantella movement of the Dance Symphony (No. 5, 1925).

== Reputation ==
Today, Reznicek is mainly remembered for the overture to his opera Donna Diana, composed in 1894. The overture is a popular stand-alone piece at symphonic concerts, and it served as the theme for the American radio (1947–1955) series Challenge of the Yukon, which later migrated to the TV series (1955–1958) Sergeant Preston of the Yukon. It was also used in the 1950s on the BBC's Children's Hour by Stephen King-Hall for his talks on current affairs.

Reznicek's break-through as a composer came with Donna Diana in 1894. This opera differs considerably from his first three operas written for Prague. Historically Donna Diana (written exactly at the same time as Humperdinck's Hansel and Gretel opera) marks the decisive step away from Wagner-imitation to Wagner-reception in the way of going beyond Wagner. (Strauss, with his Guntram failed to achieve this aim.) Reznicek's next opera Till Eulenspiegel goes further in exploiting the concept of a Volksoper including older music styles. In the 1908 revision of Donna Diana he eliminated further hints of Wagner. Nevertheless, in the years after Donna Diana he did not fulfill the expectations Donna Diana had raised. It was only with his experience at the Komische Oper Berlin and the illness of his second wife that Reznicek found a new and very personal style, one that can be described as a sort of musical expressionism. In a letter to Ernst Déczy in 1921, he claimed to have modernized his style considerably. He never left the realm of tonal composition, but he often made use of bi-tonal constructions. And in the dramaturgy of his operas he was clearly influenced by silent-movie aesthetics. Reznicek was skeptical about the Schoenberg concept of twelve-tone composition, but not against atonalism per se. He greatly admired Alban Bergs Wozzeck and Lulu. Reznicek also was open to all types of music as possible sources for his own compositions; old music from the pre-Bach era, but also modern dance music and Jazz. (He made use of a Jazz-band in his operas Satuala, Benzin, Das Opfer and even the ballet Das goldene Kalb. All this he amalgamated into his own post-Wagnerian style, creating an early example of Polystylistic Composition. The critics of his time did not understand this concept and often accused him of Eulenspiegelei.

In the late 1920s, he was respected as one of the most important German composers of the 1860s generation. But even then his fame began to be surpassed by the modern music of younger composers. Like so many composers who had adhered to tonal music in the 20th century, and being still active after WW I, his music fell into oblivion after WW II with the rise of modernism. In the case of Reznicek, the situation was also aggravated by the false accusation that he had been a Nazi sympathizer. In the 1970s, the only conductor who tried to give Reznicek's music some exposure to modern audiences was the late Gordon Wright. Together with Felicitas von Reznicek he founded the Reznicek society with such prominent members as Maurice Abravanel, Max Burle-Marx and Igor Kipnis. But with the passing of Gordon Wright this society stopped all activities. In 2012, Reznicek's great-grandson founded the Reznicek-Archiv at Wedemark which is now the central point for all Reznicek research. The archive also digitized all printed Reznicek scores and inserted them in the International Music Score Library Project. In 2013, the Editio Reznicek also began, with the aim to publish the numerous scores of Reznicek which had remained in manuscript.

== Works ==
=== Symphonies ===
- Symphony No. 1, "Tragic" in D minor (composed 1902)
- Symphony No. 2, "Ironic" in B♭ (composed 1904)
- Symphony No. 3, "Im alten Stil" in D major (composed 1918)
- Symphony No. 4 in F minor (composed 1919)
- Symphony No. 5, "Tanz-Symphonie" (composed 1924)

=== Orchestral works ===
- Studysymphony (Graz 1881, lost)
- Studysymphony Nr. 1 (Leipzig 1882, lost)
- Studysymphony Nr. 2 (Leipzig 1882, lost)
- Eine Lustspielouvertüre (1881/1896; also Piano4hg.)
- Sinfonische Suite Nr. 1 e-Moll (1883)
- Sinfonische Suite D-Dur (1884) (fragment only)
- Grünne-Marsch Band (1890; also Piano4hg)
- Probszt-Marsch Band (1891) [only Pf-Score extant]
- Gebet aus der Oper Emerich Fortunat Band (1891)
- Der rote Sarafan Band (1891)
- Sinfonische Suite Nr. 2 D-Dur (1896)
- Wie Till Eulenspiegel lebte, Sinfonisches Zwischenspiel in Form einer Ouvertüre (1900; = Zwischenaktmusik from Till Eulenspiegel)
- Goldpirol: Idyllische Ouvertüre (1903); (2. Version 1936 as: Frühlingsouvertüre: Im deutschen Wald)
- Praeludium und chromatische Fuge für großes Orchester cis-Moll (1904; 1. Version; 2. Version; also arr. for Organ 1921)
- Nachtstück für Violine or Violoncello and small Orchestra (1905)
- Serenade G-Dur Strings (1905, rev. 1920)
- Introduktion und Valse-Capriccio for Violin and Orchestra D-Dur (1906; lost)
- Schlemihl – Ein Lebensbild, Sinfonische Dichtung (with Tenor-Solo; 1912)
- Praeludium und (Ganzton-)Fuge c-Moll (1913, also arr. for Organ 1920)
- Der Sieger – Ein symphonisch-satyrisches Zeitbild, Sinfonische Dichtung (with Alt-Solo, mixed Choir; 1913)
- Der Frieden – A vision for Oragan, Orchestra and mixed Choir (1914)
- Marsch for Orchestra/Band/Piano (1915)
- Konzertstück für Violine und Orchester E-Dur (1918)
- Konzert für Violine und Orchester e-Moll (1918)
- Thema und Variationen Tragische Geschichte (mit Bariton-Solo; 1921) (also version without Bariton-Solo)
- Traumspiel-Suite for small orchestra (1921; also Pf.-solo)
- Potpourri aus Die wunderlichen Geschichten des Kapellmeister Kreisler for Salonorchestra (1922; also for Pf-Solo)
- Valse pathetique für Orchestra/Salonorchestra/Piano (1923)
- Valse serieuse (Ernster Walzer) (1924; original 3rd. movement of Tanzsinfonie)
- Raskolnikoff, Fantasie-Ouvertüre Nr. 1 (1925)
- Raskolnikoff, Fantasie-Ouvertüre Nr. 2 (1925) (lost)
- Suite aus Die beste Polizei für Strings (1926)
- Festouvertüre Dem befreiten Köln (1926)
- Sinfonische Variationen über Kol Nidrey (1929) [Theme = Vorspiel zur Oper Holofernes]
- Raskolnikoff, Fantasie-Ouvertüre Nr. 3 (1. Version 1929; 2. Version 1930)
- Karneval-Suite for small orchestra (1931/43 = Zwischenaktmusik aus Gondoliere des Dogen)
- Mea culpa Strings (1932; = Vorspiel zu Das Opfer)

=== Stage works ===
- Die Jungfrau von Orleans, opera in 3 acts after Friedrich Schiller (composed 1884-86)
- Andreas Hofer, Singspiel in 1 Akt by Albert Lortzing (Revision by Emil Nikolaus von Reznicek [including two numbers composed by Reznicek)] (composed 1887
- Satanella, opera in 2 acts on a libretto by Reznicek (composed 1887)
- Emerich Fortunat, opera in 2 acts on a libretto by Reznick/Dubsky (composed 1888)
- Donna Diana, opera in 3 acts after Agustín Moreto's El desdén con el desdén (composed 1894, revised 1908 and 1933)
- Till Eulenspiegel, opera in 2 acts after Johann Fischart's Eulenspiegel Reimensweiss (composed 1900, revised 1933/34)
- Die verlorene Braut, operetta (composed 1910) (not performed)
- Der Arzt wider Willen, opera in 2 acts by Charles Gounod (translated and arranged for the German stage by Emil Nikolaus von Reznicek) (1910)
- Die Angst vor der Ehe, operetta after Taufstein and Urban (composed 1912)
- Ritter Blaubart, opera in 2 acts on a libretto by H. Eulenberg (composed 1915-17)
- Traumspiel, Stage music to August Strindbergs drama (1915)
- Nach Damaskus III, Stage music to August Strindbergs drama (1918, not performed)
- Die wunderlichen Geschichten des Kapellmeister Kreisler, (1922; Stage music to Carl Meinhards drama after E.T.A.Hoffmann) lost
- Kreislers Eckfenster (1923; Stage music to Carl Meinhards drama after E.T.A.Hoffmann) [lost]
- Holofernes, opera in 2 acts after Friedrich Hebbel's Judith und Holofernes (composed 1922)
- Die beste Polizei (1926; Stage music to Herbert Eulenbergs drama)
- Marionetten des Todes, Ballett in 4 parts Bi (1927; = Tanzsinfonie with choreography by Ellen von Cleve-Petz)
- Satuala, opera in 3 acts on a libretto by R. Laukner (composed 1927)
- Benzin, opera in 2 acts on a libretto by Calderón de la Barca (composed 1929)
- Spiel oder Ernst?, opera in 1 act on a libretto by Poul Knudsen (composed 1930)
- Der Gondoliere des Dogen, opera in 1 act on a libretto by Poul Knudsen (composed 1931) [The Doge's Gondolier]
- Das Opfer, opera in 1 act on a libretto by Poul Knudsen (composed 1932)
- Das goldene Kalb, ballet in 4 parts on a scenario of Viggo Cavling (composed 1934/35) [The Golden Calf]

=== Chamber music ===
- Nachtstück Violine or Violoncell and Piano (1905; also arr. for small orchestra)
- Stringquartet Nr. 1 C minor (1882) [Altmann Nummer 1]
- Stringquartet Nr. 2 C♯ minor (1906)
- Stringquartet-Fragment in C♯ minor (ca 1920; only Mov. 1.-3)
- Stringquartet Nr. 3 C♯ minor (1921) [Altmann Nr. 2]
- Stringquartet Nr. 4 D minor (1922) [Movement 1.+ 2. arranged from Stringquartet C♯ minor 1907; Movement 3.+ 4. new ][Altmann Nr. 3]
- Allegro alla polacca for Stringquartet (1922; originally new 4th movement for Quartett in D minor)
- Stringquartet Nr. 5 E minor (1925/30)
- Stringquartet Nr. 6 B major (1932) [2.+3. movement taken from Quartet Nr. 5 E minor] [Altmann Nr. 4]
- 2 Movements for Stringquartet(?; Fragments)
- Vorspiel zu Holofernes (Kol Nidrey) Violin and Piano (1925)
- Für unsere Kleinen – Movement for Pianotrio (1921)
- Walzer-Lied für Pianotrio (1924; Excerpt from Valse pathetique; also Piano solo)

=== Piano ===
- Hexenszene aus Macbeth (composed Marburg 1876-78) (lost)
- Zwei Fantasiestücke (composed Marburg 1876–1878; published 1882/1896)
- Letzte Gedanken des Selbstmörders for piano (composed 1878-81) [Last Thoughts of the Suicide] (lost)
- Vier Klavierstücke (composed 1880)
- Eine Lustspiel-Ouvertüre, reduction for four-hands piano (composed 1883, published 1896)
- Probszt-Marsch (composed 1891)
- Sinfonische Suite Nr. 2 D maior, reduction for Piano four hands (1896)
- Marsch (1915; alsoOrchestra, Band)
- Traumspiel-Suite, reduction for piano (composed 1921)
- Potpourri from Die wunderlichen Geschichten des Kapellmeister Kreisler (1922; also version for Salonorchestra)
- Walzer-Lied (1924; Excerpt from Valse pathetique; arr. also for Pianotrio)
- Ernster Walzer (composed 1924)
- Valse Pathétique (composed 1924, orchestrated 1924)
- Vier sinfonische Tänze, (composed 1924, including Ernster Walzer; orchestrated in 1925 with newly added Ländler as 3rd. movement)
- Menuett, piano reduction from the stage music to Polizei (composed 1926)
- Liebeserklärung (composed 1943)

=== Organ ===
- Präludium und chromatische Fuge in C♯ minor (composed 1907, arr. for Oran in 1921)
- Präludium und Fuge in C minor (composed 1913, arr. for Organ in 1918)
- Fantasie "Kommt Menschenkinder, rühmt und preist" (composed 1930)

=== Works for choir ===
- Choir for a choir-concert at the Gymnasium of Marburg (1877) (lost)
- Requiem (Studywork Graz 1878–1881, lost)
- Requiem D minor Josef Schmeykal for Soli, mixed Choir, Organ and Orchestra (1894; lost)
- Messe F-Maior for Soli, mixed Choir and Orchestra (1898 to commemorate the 50th Year of the ascension to the throne of Emperor Franz Josef 1; lost)
- In Memoriam, Alt, Bariton, mixed Choir, Organ and Strings (1915, 1929, 1936)
- Vater unser, Choralfantasie for mixed Choir and Organ (1919)
- Sieben deutsche Volkslieder from the 16. und 17. Century for mixed Choir/Piano (1924)
- Der steinerne Psalm for mixed Choir, Orgel and Orchestra (1929; Text: Karl Bröger)
- Vom ewigen Frieden, Kantate for Soli, mixed Choir and large Orchestra, (1930, Text: Reznicek, not performed)
- Wiewohl ein armer Narr ich bin: Deutsches Volkslied of the 16. Century for mixed Choir (1930) [1. Version]
- Von rechter Lieb und Stetigkeit. Deutsches Volkslied of the 16. Century for Voice/Pf or Chor/Organ (1933) [2.+3. Version]
- Sieben deutsche Volkslieder aus dem 16. und 17. Jahrhundert for mixed Chor/Klavier, 2. Folge (1936)

=== Songs ===
- Ruhm und Ewigkeit (Glory and eternity) Tenor or Mezzosopran and Orchestra (1903; Text: Nietzsche)
- Drei deutsche Volkslieder aus Des Knaben Wunderhorn for small Orchestra/Piano (1905)
- Zwei Balladen aus Friedericianischer Zeit, Bass and Orchestra/Piano (1912, Text: Friedrich de la Motte Fouqué, Georg von Kries)
- Vier Bet- und Bußgesänge für Alt or Bass and small Orchestra/Piano (1913, Text: Bibble)
- Drei Stimmungen (1883; Reznicek)
- Trois Mélodies (1897; ?, Goethe)
- Drei Gesänge eines Vagabunden (1904; M. Drescher)
- Drei Gedichte (1904; M. Drescher)
- Drei Gedichte (1904; Henckell)
- Drei Lieder (1905; Bierbaum, Forrer, Henckell)
- Schelmische Abwehr (1905; Henckell)
- Drei Lieder (1918; Owiglas; Mörike; Eichendorf)
- Die Schiffbrüchigen (1921; Drescher)
- Madonna a Rhein. ein deutsches Wiegenlied (1924; H.H.Cramer)
- Sieben Lieder für mittlere Singstimme und Klavier (1939; Ginzkey, Lilienkron, Höcker)
- Wächterlied (1939; nach einer Volksweise des 16. Jahrhunderts)

== Selected discography ==
- Theme and Variations after the poem "Tragische Geschichte (Tragic Story)" by Adelbert von Chamisso for large orchestra and baritone. Performed by Barry McDaniel (baritone) and the Stuttgart Radio Symphony Orchestra conducted by Carl Schuricht (Schuricht-Edition Vol. 14, combined with works by Richard Strauss, Hans Pfitzner, and Max Reger) (Hänssler).
- Symphony No. 1 in D minor "Tragische (Tragic)", Vier Bet- und Bußgesänge (Four Songs of Prayer and Repentance). Performed by Marina Prudenskaya (mezzo-soprano) and the Brandenburgisches Staatsorchester Frankfurt (Oder) conducted by Frank Beermann. CPO 777 223-2
- Symphony No. 2 in B♭ major "Ironische (Ironic)" and No. 5 "Tanz-Symphonie (Dance Symphony)". Performed by the Bern Symphony Orchestra conducted by Frank Beermann. CPO 777 056-2
- Symphony No. 3 in D major "Im alten Stil (In an Old Style)" and No. 4 in F minor. Performed by the Robert Schumann Philharmonic of the Theater Chemnitz. conducted by Frank Beermann. CPO 777 637-2
- Symphony No. 3 in D major and Symphony No. 4 in F minor. Performed by the Philharmonia Hungarica conducted by Gordon Wright. Koch Schwann CD11091. (1984/85)
- Der Sieger (The Victor) for alto and orchestra. Performed by Beate Koepp (alto) and the WDR Symphony Orchestra and Choir (Cologne) conducted by Michail Jurowski. CPO 999 898-2
- Schlemihl, Symphonic Life Story for tenor and orchestra and Fantasy Overture No. 2 'Raskolnikoff'. Performed by Nobuaki Yamamasu (tenor) and the WDR Symphony Orchestra conducted by Michail Jurowski. CPO 999 795-2
- A Comedy Overture, Theme and Variations after the poem "Tragische Geschichte" by Adelbert von Chamisso for large orchestra and baritone and Symphonic Variations on 'Kol Nidrey'. Performed by Alexander Vassiliev (bass) and the WDR Symphony Orchestra conducted by Michail Jurowski. CPO 999 795-2
- Idyllic Overture "Goldpirol (Golden Oreole)", Symphonic Entr'acte in form an overture "Wie Till Eulenspiegel lebte (How Till Eulenspiegel Lived)", Konzertstück for violin and orchestra in E major, Prelude and Fugue in C minor and Nachtstück (Night Piece) for violin, horns, harp and string orchestra. Performed by Sophie Jaffé (violin) and the Berlin Radio Symphony Orchestra conducted by Marcus Bosch. CPO 777 983-2
- Carnival Suite in an Old Style, Dream Play Suite and Symphonic Suite No. 1 in E minor. Performed by the Staatskapelle Weimar conducted by Stefan Solyom. CPO 555 056-2
- Donna Diana (opera, 1894). Performed by Max Wittges (bass), Manuela Uhl (soprano) and others, Kiel Opera Chorus and Philharmonic Orchestra conducted by Ulrich Windfuhr. CPO 999 991-2
- Ritter Blaubart (opera, 1918). Performed by David Pittman-Jennings (baritone), Arutjun Kotchinian (tenor) and others, Rundfunk-Sinfonieorchester Berlin conducted by Michail Jurowski. CPO 999 899-2
- Benzin(opera, 1928). Performed by Kouta Räsänen, Johanna Stojkovic, Guibee Yang, Susanne Thielemann, Matthias Winter, Chor der Oper Chemnitz, Robert-Schumann-Philharmonie, Frank Beermann. CPO 777 653-2
- String Quartet No. 3 in C♯ minor (1921). Performed by the Franz Schubert String Quartet (Combined with Erich Wolfgang Korngold's String Quartet No. 1 in A major, Op. 16). Nimbus 5506-2

== See also ==
- List of Austrians in music
