= Donna Diana =

Comic opera

- Comic opera by Emil von Reznicek
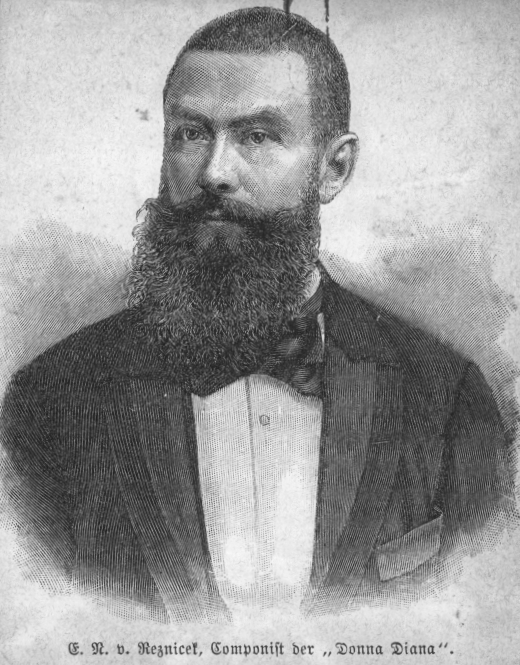
- von Reznicek in 1899
- Librettist: von Reznicek
- Language: German
- Based on: El desdén, con el desdén by Agustín Moreto y Cavana
- Premiere: 16 December 1894; Neues Deutsches Theater, Prague

Donna Diana is a comic opera in three acts by Emil von Reznicek. The libretto, written by the composer, is based on a German translation by Carl August West (Joseph Schreyvogel) titled Donna Diana oder Stolz und Liebe (... or Pride and Love) of the Spanish comedy El desdén, con el desdén (Disdain with Disdain) by Agustín Moreto y Cavana.

== Performance history ==
It was first performed on 16 December 1894 at the Neues Deutsches Theater in Prague. The opera was successful in its day, with productions in several German theatres, but currently is rarely performed; its overture, however, has often been recorded and is sometimes heard in the concert hall.

The opera was revised by the composer twice, in 1908 and in 1933.

== Roles ==
Roles, voice types, premiere cast
Role	Voice type	Premiere cast, 16 December 1894 Conductor: Rudolf Krzyzanowski
Don Diego, sovereign count of Barcelona	bass	Moritz Frauscher
Donna Diana, hereditary princess, his daughter	soprano	Leonore Better
Donna Laura, his niece	soprano	Sarolta von Rettich-Pirk
Donna Fenisa, his niece	mezzo-soprano	Gisela von Ruttersheim
Don Cesar, prince of Urgel	tenor	Gustav Seidel
Don Louis, prince of Bearne	tenor	Adolf Perluss
Don Gaston, count of Foix	bass	Georg Sieglitz
Perin, court jester	baritone	Max Dawison
Floretta, foster sister and confidante of the princess	mezzo-soprano	Lina Carmasini
Three sounders of fanfares, a herald, knights, court servants, citizens, people

== Synopsis ==
Don Diego's palace at Barcelona at the time of Catalonia's independence

=== Act 1 ===
Don Cesar, Prince of Urgel, is resting in Diego's Hall after having won the first prize in a tournament. He muses sadly on Donna Diana's coldness, which all his victories fail to overcome. Perrin the clown takes pity on him, and gives him the advice to return coldness for coldness. Don Cesar promises to try this, though it seems hard to hide his deep love. Floretta, Donna Diana's foster-sister enters to announce the result of the tournament. She flirts with Perrin, to whom she is attached, but he turns a cold shoulder to her and she departs in a rage, though he is head over heels in love with her.

The next scene opens on a brilliant crowd, welcoming the Count Sovereign of Barcelona and his daughter Donna Diana. The Count greets them graciously, and making a sign to the three gallant Princes, Don Cesar of Urgel, Don Louis of Bearne and Gaston Count de Foix, they advance to receive their laurels on bended knee from the Princess, who crowns Cesar with a golden wreath, while the two other princes each win a silver prize. When the ceremony is over, Don Diego turns to his daughter, asking her to choose a husband and give an heir to the country, but Diana declares that love seems like poison to her, and marriage death. Gaston and Louis, nothing daunted, determine to try their luck, and while the father prays to God to soften his daughter's heart, Cesar's courage sinks ever lower. Donna Diana alone is cool and calm, inwardly resolved to keep her hand and heart free. She is envied by her two cousins Fenisa and Laura, who would gladly choose one of the gallant warriors. Perrin now advises the Princes to try their wit and gallantry on the Princess. Gaston begins to plead his cause, declaring, that he will not leave Barcelona without a bride and Louis follows his example; both are greatly admired and applauded by the assistants, but Diana finds their compliments ridiculous and their wit shallow. Cesar without a word retires to the background, and when asked by the Princess why he does not compete with his rivals, answers "Because I will not love, nor ever wish to be loved; I only woo you, to show you my regard." Greatly mortified, Diana resolves to punish his pride.

=== Act 2 ===
A ball is going on in the Prince's gardens. Each of the ladies has a bunch of different coloured ribbons, and decides to get the man she loves for her own. Diana explains that each knight is to choose a colour, which entitles him to own the lady wearing that colour, as long as the masquerade lasts. Don Louis choosing green gets Donna Laura, Don Gaston wearing red is chosen by Fenisa; Perrin loudly asserting that, abhorring love he chooses the obscure colour black, wins Floretta, and Don Cesar choosing white, finds himself Donna Diana's champion. She takes his arm, and her beauty so arouses him, that forgetting himself, he confesses his love. Triumphant but mocking, she turns from him. In a bantering tone he asks her, if she really believed, that his entreaties were real?

Furious at being so easily duped she bids him leave her, and when alone resolves to have revenge. She calls Perrin to fetch her cousins, and charges him to let Cesar know that he can hear her sing in the gardens. Adorned with beautiful garments and surrounded by her attendants, she plays and sings sweetly as soon as she hears Don Cesar's steps. But he wanders in the grounds, admiring the plants, to all appearance deaf to beauty and song. Impatiently Diana signals to Floretta to let Cesar know, that he is in the presence of his Princess, at which, as awaking from a dream, Cesar bows to the Princess and excuses himself, leaving Diana in despair.

=== Act 3 ===
Perrin gives vent to his feelings of love for Floretta, and about the Princess, whose state of mind he guesses. He is delighted to see his scheme successful, and sings a merry air, overheard by Diana. Offstage Don Louis is heard, serenading Donna Laura, while Don Gaston sings Fenisa's praise, so that poor Diana is surrounded by loving couples, who shamelessly carry on their courting before her very eyes, and then retire casting mischievous glances at their disgusted mistress.

Diana sees Cesar approaching and determines to try again to in order to humble his pride. She explains that she has resolved to yield to her father, and give her hand to Prince Louis. For a moment Cesar stands petrified, but Perrin whispers not to believe in women's wiles. So he controls himself once more, congratulates her, wishing the same courtesy from the Princess, because, as he calmly adds, he has become betrothed to Donna Laura.

That is the last straw for Diana. Her reserve vanishes when her secret love for the hero, which she has not even admitted to herself, is in danger. She breaks down, and is found by her father, who enters, loudly acknowledging Don Louis as his son-in-law, and sanctioning Don Cesar's choice of Donna Laura. But Cesar begs to receive his bride from Diana's own hands, at which the latter rising slowly, asks her father, if he is still willing to leave to her alone the selection of a husband. Don Diego granting this, she answers: "Then I choose him who conquered pride through pride." "And who may this happy mortal be?" says Cesar. "You ask? It's you, my tyrant," she replies, and sinks into her lover’s arms.

== Recordings ==
In 2004 cpo released a recording made during a run of performances in May 2003 at the Kiel Opera House, with Ulrich Windfuhr conducting the Kiel Philharmonic Orchestra.

== Trivia ==
The overture served as the theme for the American radio (1947–1955) series Challenge of the Yukon, which later migrated to the TV series (1955–1958) Sergeant Preston of the Yukon. It was used in the 1950s on the BBC's Children's Hour by Stephen King-Hall for his talks on current affairs.

It is one of the few works written in the unusual time signature of 3/16.
