= Benzoin aldolase =

Enzyme

benzoin aldolase

Identifiers
- EC no.: 4.1.2.38
- CAS no.: 122097-01-2

Databases
- IntEnz: IntEnz view
- BRENDA: BRENDA entry
- ExPASy: NiceZyme view
- KEGG: KEGG entry
- MetaCyc: metabolic pathway
- PRIAM: profile
- PDB structures: RCSB PDB PDBe PDBsum
- Gene Ontology: AmiGO / QuickGO
Search
- PMC: articles
- PubMed: articles
- NCBI: proteins

The enzyme benzoin aldolase (EC 4.1.2.38) catalyzes the chemical reaction:

2-hydroxy-1,2-diphenylethanone $\rightleftharpoons$ 2 benzaldehyde

This enzyme belongs to the family of lyases, specifically the aldehyde-lyases, which cleave carbon-carbon bonds. The systematic name of benzoin is indeed is 2-hydroxy-1,2-diphenylethanone benzaldehyde-lyase (benzaldehyde-forming)—the systematic name of benzoin is 2-hydroxy-1,2-diphenylethanone. Other names in common use include benzaldehyde lyase, and 2-hydroxy-1,2-diphenylethanone benzaldehyde-lyase. This enzyme employs one cofactor: thiamin diphosphate.

== Structural studies ==
As of late 2007, 3 structures have been solved for this class of enzymes, with PDB accession codes 2AG0, 2AG1, and 2UZ1.
