= Scam genealogical book =

Generic introduction to surnames and heraldry

The popularity of genealogy, encouraged by the increasing use of the Internet is encouraging a number of people to mass-market what authorities regard as "scam genealogical books" which are sometimes promoted by affiliated websites. They tend to contain a general introduction, a section about the origin of surnames in general, a section about heraldry, a couple of blank charts for the purchaser to copy and complete once they have done their own research, a few recipes, and (sometimes) a list of names, addresses and telephone numbers culled from publicly available telephone directories.

The books are not unique to a particular surname, are not published annually, and contain no pictures of the buyer's family members. In a recent case, Jeffery Scism, a San Bernardino genealogist, said the fines for such practises are puny when compared with the hundreds of thousands of dollars he believes such vendors rake in.

Those who have sold such books so far include:

- Burke's Peerage World Book of [Surname]s - not to be confused with Burke's Peerage
- Halberts Family Heritage - World Book of [Surname]s
- William Pince Publishers - SGN Genealogical Foundation
- Maxwell MacMaster
- The [Surname] Name in History.
