= Benzin (film) =

- Directed by: Asen Blatechki; Katerina Goranova
- Written by: Alexey Kozhuharov
- Produced by: Asen Blatechki
- Starring: Asen Blatechki; Snejana Makaveeva
- Release date: May 19, 2017
- Running time: 110 minutes
- Country: Bulgaria
- Language: Bulgarian

Benzin (Bulgarian: Бензин) is a 2017 Bulgarian action thriller film directed by Katerina Goranova and Asen Blatechki and written by Alexey Kozhuharov.

== Plot ==
After 15 years in prison, a talented racing driver and mechanic returns to life to fulfill his last promise to his dead beloved - to bring back Luce, the car bearing her name, and to dispense justice.

== Cast ==
- Asen Blatechki as Dim
- Snejana Makaveeva as Nicole
- bg:Калин Врачански as Little Rado
- Bashar Rahal as Karim
- Sully Erna as Hitchhiker
