= Benzin (opera) =

Benzin (German for "petrol") is a comic opera in 2 acts by Emil Nikolaus von Reznicek, with a libretto based on Homer's Odyssey and material from Calderón de la Barca's play El mayor encanto, amor (1635), composed in 1929 but not performed until 2010 at the Theater Chemnitz, Germany. The plot concerns a Zeppelin captain, Ulysses Eisenhardt, who lands on an island seeking its fuel reserves, but whose crew are ensnared by the enchanting Gladys Thunderbolt.

The 2010 premiere featuring Kouta Räsänen, Johanna Stojkovic, Guibee Yang, Susanne Thielemann, Matthias Winter, Opera Chemnitz Chorus, Robert-Schumann-Philharmonie, conducted by Frank Beermann and directed by Martin Duncan, was recorded and released on CD in 2017 by CPO.
