= Souvenir plot =

Term in Scottish property law

A souvenir plot of land is a novelty item that purports to give the holder ownership over a very small piece of land, such as 1 square inch (6.5 cm^{2}) or 20 square feet (1.9 m^{2}). The novelty item may or may not purport to confer additional benefits such as products based on the commonly held, but false, belief that all landholders in Scotland have the right to title themselves "Laird", "Lord", or "Lady". The item or company selling them may claim to be legally granting ownership of the plot to the holder, but most explicitly refute this, sometimes in the fine print.

Most modern companies selling souvenir plots purport to be selling plots of land in Scotland, but companies have sold "plots" from England and Ireland as well. These companies have attracted controversy for the fact that they do not actually confer lands or titles legally to the holder, despite claims to the contrary in advertisements or on their websites.

== Right of ownership ==
The souvenir plot will advertise the purchase of 'ownership' of small plot of land part of an estate. However, Scots property law only recognises a defined number of real rights, or rights in rem, which follows the legal principle shared with other jurisdictions, that only real rights within the numerus clausus (closed number) are competent. Without the valid creation of a recognised real right, an individual only holds a personal (contractual) right against another. This means that where an individual contracts to purchase property from another, they only hold a contractual right not a right in rem in the property itself. Ownership is also a real right, or right in rem that falls within the numerus clausus.

=== An absolute singular (unititular) right of ownership ===
Scots law follows the Roman law principle that the right of ownership in property (for definition of term see above) is absolute. Other legal systems such as United States jurisdictions consider ownership as a 'bundle of rights' which can be separated into different components and separated amongst different individuals. Instead in Scots law, ownership is a singular unitary right that cannot be broken down into different components, it can only be transferred to another in whole or be encumbered through the creation of inferior real rights. The owner of a 'thing' has the right to usus, fructus, abusus - the right to use, to the fruits (enjoyment) and the right to abuse or destroy the property. In contrast to historically feudal systems such as England & Wales or Scotland (Davidian Revolution – 28 November 2004), ownership is not split among individuals, such as interests held by a feudal superior. Because ownership is a single right, when it is transferred, it transfers instantaneously, with the previous Owner being deprived of all ownership in the property, at the moment of registration in the Land Register.

==== Transferring a right of ownership in Scots law ====
There are three stages to creating a right of ownership in land:

1. The contract (the Missives of Sale): for the contract to be formally valid it must meet the Requirements of Writing (Scotland) Act 1995.
2. The conveyance (the Disposition): for the conveyance to be formally valid, the deed, known as the disposition, must meet the Requirements of Writing (Scotland) Act 1995.
3. Registration in the Land Register of Scotland: this must be registered validly in accordance with the Land Registration (Scotland) Act 2012.

==== Registration of souvenir plots ====
Even if a seller of souvenir plots does validly create a contract of sale for the plot of land sold and provides the buyer with a valid disposition, the registration of the disposition deed is not possible under the Land Registration (Scotland) Act 2012. This replaced the longstanding rule found in the Land Registration (Scotland) Act 1979.

"Land Registration (Scotland) Act 2012 Section 22

(2)In subsection (1)(b), “souvenir plot” means a plot of land which—

(a)is of inconsiderable size and of no practical utility, and

(b)is neither—

(i)a registered plot, nor

(ii) a plot the ownership of which has, at any time, separately been constituted or transferred by a document recorded in the Register of Sasines." [bold added]

Since the seller will unlikely 'sell' a souvenir plot of both a considerable size or practical utility, and a registered plot, the disposition will be unable to be registered in the Land Register. This means that the buyer cannot acquire a real right of ownership in Scots law. Therefore, it is impossible for buyers of the sale to become 'owners' of a souvenir plot in the way that buyer can become 'owners' of a regular plot of land.

== Sale of right to title, heraldry, coat of arms, etc ==
=== Titles ===
It is not possible for a Buyer to legally purchase a "right" to use Scottish nobility titles such as lord or lady. These are only capable of creation at the pleasure of the Sovereign (ie: His Majesty the King) by the issuance of letters patent.

In an interview with the Journal of the Law Society of Scotland, The Court of the Lord Lyon, the court in Scotland which regulates the award of heraldry (ie: titles and coats of arms), made the following statement concerning the legal implications of the purchase of souvenir plots:

“Ownership of a souvenir plot of land does not bring with it the right to any description such as ‘laird’, ‘lord’ or ‘lady’. ‘Laird’ is not a title but a description applied by those living on and around the estate, many of whom will derive their living from it, to the principal landowner of a long-named area of land. It will, therefore, be seen that it is not a description which is appropriate for the owner of a normal residential property.

“It cannot properly be used to describe a person who owns a small part of a larger piece of land. The term ‘laird’ is not one recognisable by attachment to a personal name and thus there is no official recognition of ‘XY, Laird of Z’.

“The words ‘lord’ and ‘lady’ apply to those on whom a peerage has been confirmed and do not relate to the ownership of land.

“Ownership of a souvenir plot of land is not sufficient to bring a person otherwise ineligible within the jurisdiction of the Lord Lyon for seeking a coat of arms.” [bold added]

=== Law of heraldry ===
The Public Register of All Arms and Bearings in Scotland which was established in 1672, pursuant to the Lyon King of Arms Act 1672 (c 47), and lists all heraldry awarded in Scotland. Heraldry is considered to be incorporeal property in Scots law, so is capable of having a right of ownership over the use and control of the heraldic coat of arms. The award of coat of arms in Scots law confers a status and a precedence on the holder of the arms, and their successors, whether a person or a corporate body.

Any device other than letters or numerals, displayed on a shield, lozenge, cartouche or rectangular banner or set upon a wreath, crest, coronet or chapeau amounts to an armorial bearing the display of which is subject to the provisions of the Lyon King of Arms Act 1672.

==== Lyon King of Arms Act 1672 ====
The 1672 Act of the Parliament of the Kingdom of Scotland (still in force today) provides that no person is allowed to use a coat of arms unless those arms are recorded in their right in the Public Register of All Arms and Bearings in Scotland. The penalty for a breach of the 1672 Act is a fine of £100. All the goods on which those arms are illegally displayed may become forfeit to the Crown, or alternatively the offending arms to be erased or defaced from any building or monument.

===== Creation of heraldry =====
Under the 1672 Act, heraldry is awarded by grant by the Lord Lyon, who can grant heraldic coats of arms to human individuals of Scottish domicile or Scottish heritage, irrespective of nationality (excluding Canada as Canadian coats of arms are regulated by the Canadian Heraldic Authority). This arises where no grant has previously been made. Therefore, it is not possible to purchase a right to use heraldry online.

== Outside Scotland ==
Souvenir plots with claimed titles have been offered for sale in Norway, England and Ireland as well.

== See also ==
- Established Titles
- Klondike Big Inch Land Promotion, a 1955 cereal promotion in which the reward was a deed to one square inch of land
