= 1-Keto-1,2,3,4-tetrahydrophenanthrene =

Chemical compound

Clinical data
- Other names: THP-1; 1,2,3,4-Tetrahydrophenanthren-1-one

Identifiers
- IUPAC name: 3,4-Dihydro-2H-phenanthren-1-one
- CAS Number: 573-22-8
- PubChem CID: 225683
- ChemSpider: 196209
- UNII: RAN6R458LN
- ChEMBL: ChEMBL88130
- CompTox Dashboard (EPA): DTXSID50280072

Chemical and physical data
- Formula: C_{14}H_{12}O
- Molar mass: 196.249 g·mol^{−1}
- 3D model (JSmol): Interactive image
- SMILES: C1CC2=C(C=CC3=CC=CC=C23)C(=O)C1
- InChI: InChI=1S/C14H12O/c15-14-7-3-6-12-11-5-2-1-4-10(11)8-9-13(12)14/h1-2,4-5,8-9H,3,6-7H2; Key:KBARGPSSEIXDQU-UHFFFAOYSA-N

1-Keto-1,2,3,4-tetrahydrophenanthrene (THP-1), or 1,2,3,4-tetrahydrophenanthren-1-one, is a synthetic steroid-like compound which was reported to be the first xenoestrogen. It was first synthesized in 1933 by Cook et al. and was tested due to its similarity to the presumed chemical structure of estrone. Upon reassessment many decades later, the compound was found to bind only weakly to the estrogen receptors, and, unexpectedly, did not actually have functional activity as an estrogen or antiestrogen in vitro or in vivo. It did, however, show some mixed androgenic and antiandrogenic activity in vitro.

== See also ==
- Estrin
