= Earle Graser =

Canadian actor

- Born: Earl Walter Grasser; March 3, 1909; Berlin, Ontario, Canada
- Died: April 4, 1941 (aged 32); Farmington, Michigan, United States
- Burial place: Grand Lawn Cemetery, Detroit, Michigan, United States
- Occupation: Radio actor
- Known for: Voice of the Lone Ranger
- Parents: Solomon Grasser (father); Mary Anne Klemmer (mother)

Earle Graser (March 3, 1909 – April 8, 1941) was an American radio actor at radio station WXYZ, Detroit, Michigan. He was best known as the voice of the Lone Ranger from April 1933 to April 1941.

== Early life ==
Graser was born in the manufacturing city of Berlin (now known as Kitchener) in Waterloo County, Ontario, under the name Earl Walter Grasser. His parents were Solomon Grasser and Mary Anne Klemmer, who had both been born in rural townships in the county. Earl's great-grandfather, William Grasser, was born in Germany, but moved to Canada and worked as a farmer. Earl's father, Solomon, had worked as a farm laborer, but later became a salesman at a grocery store. Berlin was a city notable for its contemporary German culture and heritage, and during the First World War, it was a focal point for anti-German sentiment in Canada. This was symbolized by the renaming of the city in 1916 from Berlin to Kitchener, after Herbert Kitchener, 1st Earl Kitchener.

In 1918, Solomon got a new job as the manager for A&P's stores in Detroit, Michigan, and moved his family there with him. At some point after this, Earle changed his name, modifying Earl to Earle and abbreviating the Germanic Walter as "W." Graser graduated from a Detroit high school and attended Wayne University (now Wayne State University) in Detroit, where he earned an A.B. in oratory, drama, and interpretive reading. He also studied law for two years, earning an LL.B. (Bachelor of Laws). While working at WXYZ, he continued taking graduate classes and earned a M.A. in speech.

During high school he worked part-time as a drugstore soda jerk and delivered groceries. Earle had always wanted a nickname, but never had one until he asked his friends to call him "Barney". He got the name from a horse that pulled the grocery wagon. (His name was Earl Grasser until it was changed to Earle Graser some time after 1918.)

In the summer of 1928, he got a job at the Michigan Theater, part of the Kunsky Theatre chain owned by John Kunsky and George Trendle. He was an usher, doubling as the announcer for the next organ selection, and occasionally had small parts in live stage shows.

In the summer of 1931, he joined a traveling show that was performing in Michigan. The company would set up a tent for two nights, performing "The Haunted House" and "Your Uncle Dudley".

In 1932, Graser was hired as a bit player by dramatic productions director James Jewell of Detroit radio station WXYZ.

For recreation, he enjoyed swimming, badminton and gardening. He sang bass in his church choir.

He listed his ambitions: own a farm in Connecticut, play Hamlet and teach elocution and drama at a small Eastern college.

== The Lone Ranger ==
The Lone Ranger radio series premiered on January 30, 1933. Graser was one of five actors who auditioned to take over the role of the Lone Ranger. According to new reports, others had voiced the role before Graser: Jack Deeds "who lasted only a few weeks"; George Stenius (later known as George Seaton), James Jewell for one performance, and Brace Beemer; the latter became the narrator of the program.

Graser was chosen to play the part of The Lone Ranger, beginning April 16, 1933. Since this was during the days of live radio broadcasts, Graser had two understudies ready to play his part, but he never missed a performance.

Three times a week, he was heard on 150 stations of the Mutual Network and on scores of independent radio stations. Each show was performed three times for live broadcasts to different time zones. Beginning in 1938, the third performance was recorded on transcription disk for stations that were not connected to the network.

Graser was allowed to take a two-week vacation during 1939 and 1940. The scripts were written so that the show could continue in his absence, with the Lone Ranger reappearing just in time to resolve the story.

The creators of the Lone Ranger program decided that the Lone Ranger must remain a mystery. Graser was required to restrict his radio acting to the role of the Lone Ranger and his identity was kept secret from the general public.

John Todd, the veteran character actor who played Tonto, was a close friend. Graser and Todd frequently drove home together and stopped for a cigar and a nip and a hand of cards.

Graser and his wife were at a night club when a prize was offered for the person who could shout "Hi-Yo, Silver!" most nearly like the Ranger. Graser entered the contest, but didn't win.

Brace Beemer appeared as the Ranger in public appearances because station owner George Trendle felt that Earl Graser did not look right for the part. Beemer was 6 foot three inches tall, had an athletic build, rode horses and was an expert shot. Graser was under six foot, slightly chubby, did not know how to ride and only shot a pistol once in his life while Beemer "looked every inch the Wild West hero".

== Death and legacy ==
On April 8, 1941, Graser was killed in Farmington, Michigan, when his car crashed into a parked truck trailer on Grand River Avenue in front of a Methodist church. It was surmised that he had fallen asleep at the wheel while on his way from the WXYZ studios in Detroit where he had completed three performances. He was survived by his widow, Jeanne, and a 15-month-old daughter, Gabrielle. By that time, he had voiced the Lone Ranger approximately 1,300 times and had some 15 million listeners in several countries, including New Zealand, Mexico, Canada and locations in South America. After his death, Graser's role as the Lone Ranger finally became widely publicized.

He was buried in Detroit's Grand Lawn Cemetery.

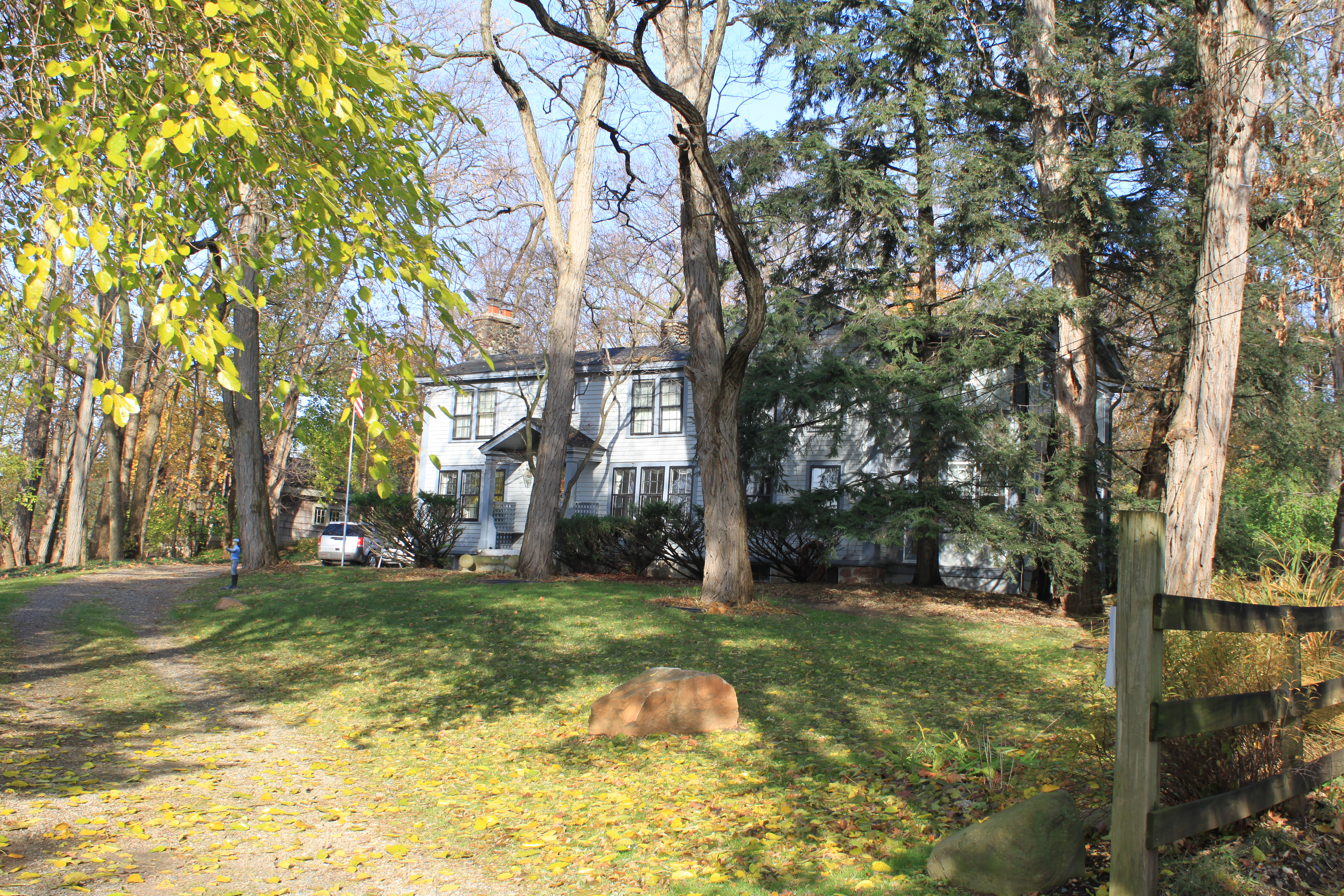
Botsford-Graser House Historic Site Farmington Hills Michigan

In 2002, his home was designated as a site on the National Register of Historic Places. The marker reads --

Site on the National Register of Historic Places

On the hillside north of this cemetery was the home of Earle Graser and his wife Jean.

Earle Graser (1909–1941) Radio’s Original "Lone Ranger"

Few people knew Earle by his given name. Millions knew him as the voice of radio theatres first great character – the Lone Ranger – from 1933 to 1941

Earle resided here until his death in a tragic auto accident a few blocks down Grand River.

May we remember him with a hearty "HI Yo Silver Away"

Beemer took over as the voice of The Lone Ranger from 1941 to the end of the series in 1955.

Most of Earle Graser's performances came before the use of transcription disks and modern audiences better remember his successor's in the role of the Lone Ranger. However, his voice continued to be heard. The radio and television series continued using his recorded voice for the famous "Hi Yo, Silver" shout.
