= Ke-mo sah-bee =

Catchphrase used by Tonto

Ke-mo sah-bee (/ˌkiːmoʊˈsɑːbiː/; often spelled kemo sabe, kemosabe or kimosabe) is the term used by the fictional Native American sidekick Tonto as the "Indian" name for the Lone Ranger in the American Lone Ranger radio program and television show. Derived from gimoozaabi, an Ojibwe and Potawatomi word that may mean 'he/she looks out in secret', it has been occasionally translated as "trusty scout" or "faithful friend".

== Meaning and origin ==
Jim Jewell, director of The Lone Ranger radio show from 1933 to 1939, took the phrase from Kamp Kee-Mo Sah-Bee, a boys' camp on Mullett Lake in Michigan, established by his father-in-law Charles W. Yeager in 1916. Yeager himself probably took the term from Ernest Thompson Seton, one of the founders of the Boy Scouts of America, who had given the meaning "scout runner" to Kee-mo-sah'-bee in his 1912 book The Book of Woodcraft and Indian Lore.

Kamp Kee-Mo Sah-Bee was in an area inhabited by the Ottawa, who speak a language that is mutually comprehensible with Ojibwe. John D. Nichols and Earl Nyholm's A Concise Dictionary of Minnesota Ojibwe defines the Ojibwe word giimoozaabi as 'he peeks' (and, in theory, 'he who peeks'), making use of the prefix giimoo(j)-, 'secretly'; Rob Malouf, now an associate professor of linguistics at San Diego State University, suggested that giimoozaabi may indeed have also meant scout (i.e., 'one who sneaks').

== In media ==
Tonto has been represented by the following actors:

- John Todd in the 1933 radio series
- Chief Thundercloud in the movie serials beginning in 1938
- Jay Silverheels in the 1950s TV series
- Michael Horse in the 1981 film
- Johnny Depp in the 2013 film

== Other uses ==
- Used in the lyrics of the song "Mr. Custer" by Larry Verne in 1960.
- Used in the song "Goodbye Kimosabe" by Warpipes from the album "Holes In The Heavens" from 1991.
- Used by Peter Tork, dressed in a parody of Tonto, as "Pronto" in "The Monkees in Texas" (1967) Season 2 Episode 13 of The Monkees.
- The 1969 instrumental "Keem-O-Sabe" by The Electric Indian reached No. 16 on the Billboard Hot 100.
- Misquoted as "qué mas sabe" on page 20 of Rabbit Redux (1971) by John Updike.
- Used by Pete Malloy (Martin Milner) in Adam-12 (1972).
- Featured in the lyrics of "The Lone Ranger", a 1976 UK hit single by Quantum Jump.
- Featured in the lyrics of "Apache (Jump on It)", a 1981 song by The Sugarhill Gang.
- Victor French (Mark Gordon) calls Michael Landon's character (Jonathan Smith) "kemosahbee" throughout the 1984 American television show Highway to Heaven.
- Featured in the lyrics of "Sharkey's Night" by Laurie Anderson from her 1984 album Mister Heartbreak.
- In the TV show MacGyver (1985–1992), it is a nickname for MacGyver used by his friend Jack Dalton.
- Featured in the lyrics of "If I Had a Boat" by Lyle Lovett, from his 1987 album Pontiac.
- Mentioned in a panel of the graphic novel A History of Violence (1997) by John Wagner and Vince Locke spoken by character Joey Muni.
- The homophone "Chemo-Sah-Bee" used in TV series The Sopranos episode "46 Long" (1999) by Anthony DeSando (as Brendan Filone) to refer to Jackie Aprile Sr.'s cancer.
- Kemosabe Records is an American record label founded in 2011 by music producer Dr. Luke and is owned by Sony Music Entertainment.
- The song "Kemosabe", a 2013 single by Manchester band Everything Everything from their album, Arc.
- Used by detective Barrel in the TV series Bosch (2014–2021).
- The German rapper OG Keemo (2017–present) often refers to himself in his songs as Keemo Sabe.
- A 2023 "Kimosabè" single by Angus Stone (as Dope Lemon).
- Often used by WABC DJ Dan Ingram to address his listeners ("Bye now, Kemosabe!")
