= Botsford-Graser House =

- U.S. National Register of Historic Places
- Michigan State Historic Site
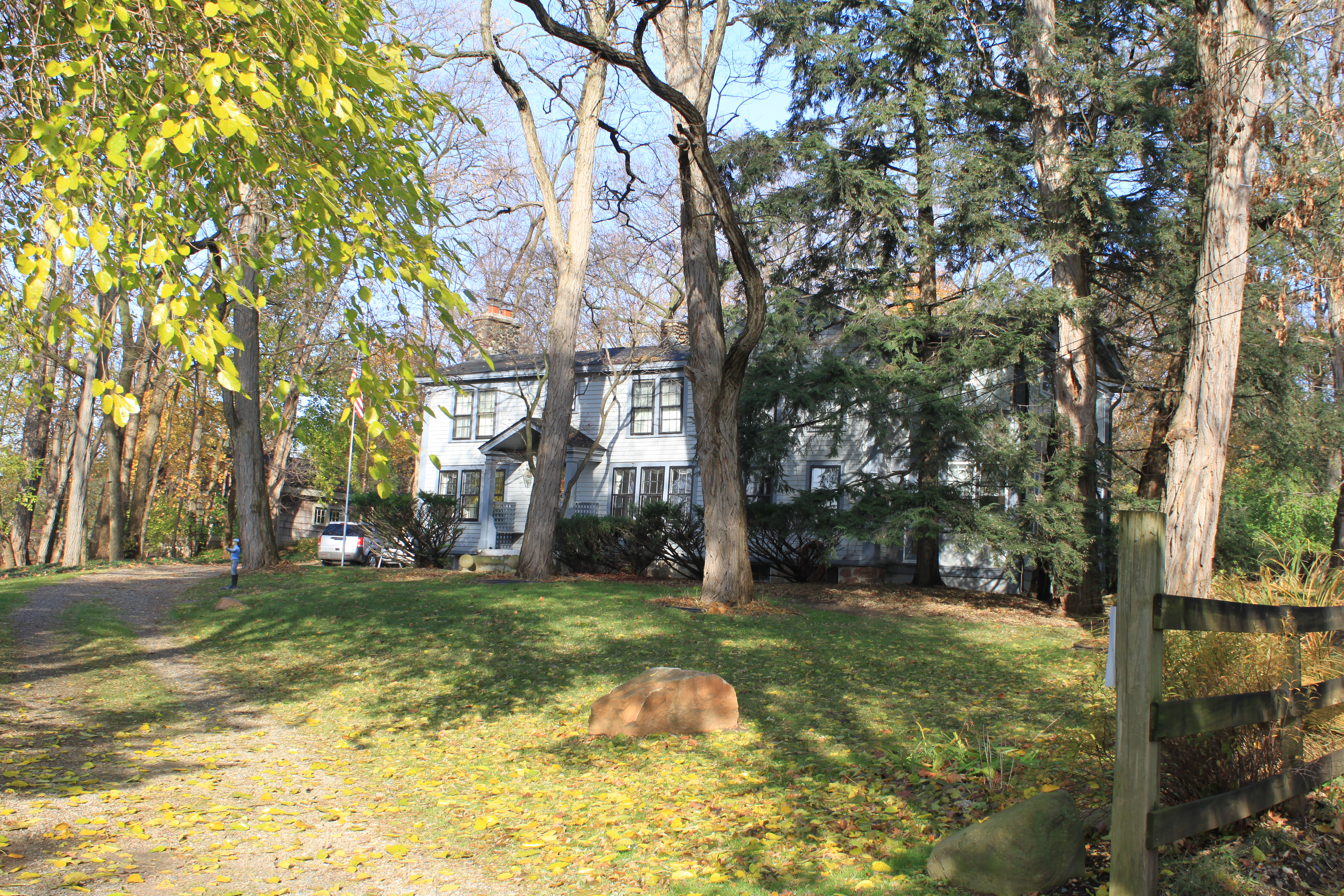
- Interactive map
- Location: 24105 Locust Dr., Farmington Hills, Michigan
- Coordinates: 42°28′13″N 83°23′04″W
- Area: 2 acres (0.81 ha)
- Built: c. 1860; 166 years ago
- Architectural style: Greek Revival, Colonial Revival
- NRHP reference No.: 02000158
- Added to NRHP: March 15, 2002

The Botsford-Graser House is a single-family home located at 24105 Locust Drive in Farmington Hills, Michigan. It was listed on the National Register of Historic Places in 2002. The house is significant in part as the home of Earle Graser, the voice of the Lone Ranger for some 13,000 performances on radio, and is also known as The Lone Ranger's House.

== History ==
Orville Botsford was born in Wayne County, New York in 1821 and settled in Farmington with his parents in 1836. Botsford purchased the property where this house is located in 1843. Botsford built this house in approximately 1860. The Botsford family owned the house until 1915.

In approximately 1939, Earle Graser and his wife Jeane moved into the house. The Grasers carried out significant rebuilding of the house. They were apparently in the process of purchasing it when Earle Graser was killed in a traffic accident in 1941.

== Description ==
The Botsford-Graser House is a two-story house of mixed Greek Revival and Colonial Revival style. It has a clapboarded exterior. The house is visually divided into two rectangular sections. The first, smaller sections fronts on the street, and is a gable-roofed Greek Revival section, with a broad frieze and classical cornices with returns. A larger section to the rear is also gable-roofed, but with the roof ridge perpendicular to the front section. This section is more Colonial Revival in design, but contains simplified Greek Revival elements. Windows in both sections are double-hung, six-over-six units.

== See also ==
- National Register of Historic Places listings in Oakland County, Michigan
