= Cowork at The Michigan =

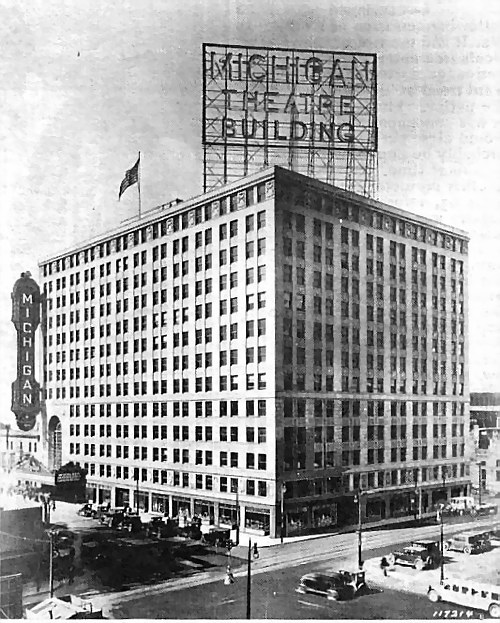
- Interactive map of Cowork at The Michigan
- Address: 220 Bagley Avenue #324; Detroit, Michigan; United States
- Coordinates: 42.334536°N 83.053298°W
- Current use: Office Space, Coworking Space, Shared Work Space, Parking garage, Parking lot

Construction
- Opened: 2015
- Architect: Rapp & Rapp

Website
- https://web.archive.org/web/20150804010040/http://coworkatthemichigan.com/

Cowork at the Michigan is a shared coworking space in the historic Michigan Building. The Michigan Building was the former Michigan Theatre Building located in downtown Detroit, Michigan, until it closed in 1976. This coworking space is one of the first major projects the building has taken on since going into decay in the late-1970s.
