= Lone Ranger =

Fictional character

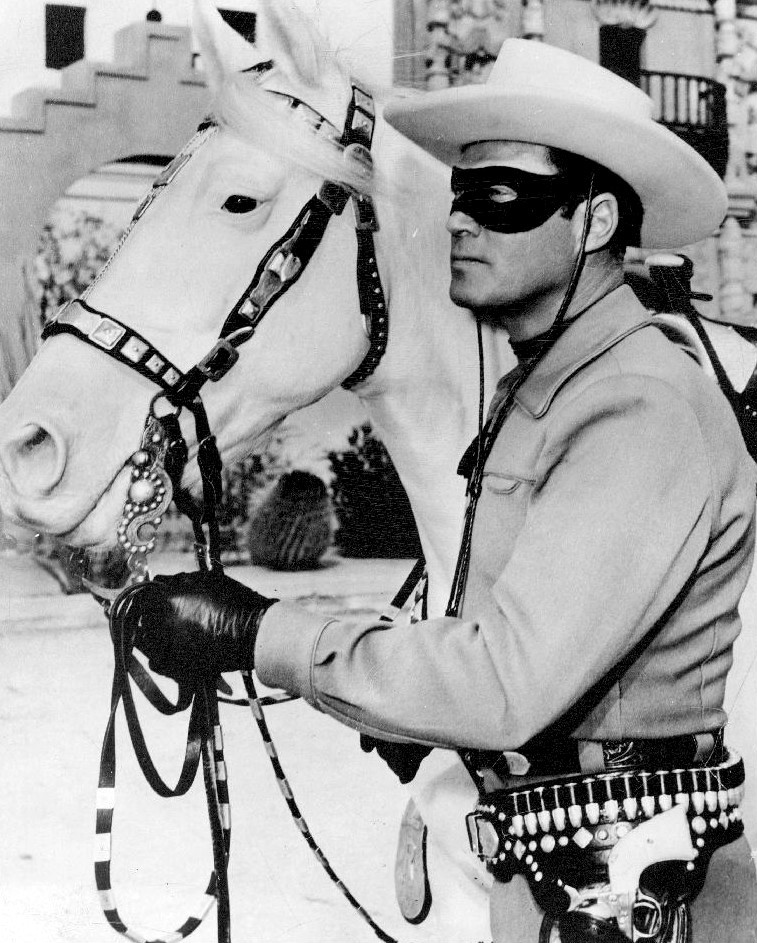
- Clayton Moore as the Lone Ranger

Publication information
- First appearance: WXYZ (January 31, 1933)
- Created by: Fran Striker; George W. Trendle

In-story information
- Alter ego: Ranger John Reid
- Team affiliations: Texas Ranger Division
- Partnerships: Tonto
- Abilities: Expert marksman, above-average athlete, horseman, hand-to-hand combatant, and master of disguise

The Lone Ranger is a fictional masked former Texas Ranger who fought outlaws in the American Old West with his Native American friend Tonto. The character has been called an enduring icon of American culture.

He first appeared in 1933 in a radio show on WXYZ (Detroit), conceived either by station owner George W. Trendle or by Fran Striker, the show's writer. Test episodes aired earlier on radio station WEBR in Buffalo. The radio series proved to be a hit, and spawned a series of books (largely written by Striker), an equally popular television show that ran from 1949 to 1957, comic books, and several films.

The title character was played on the radio show by Earle Graser for some 1,300 episodes, but two others preceded him, according to The New York Times: "...a man named Deeds, who lasted only a few weeks; a George Stenius..." After Graser died in 1941, Brace Beemer assumed the role after serving as the program's narrator. On the radio, Tonto was played by John Todd and Roland Parker, among others.

Clayton Moore portrayed the Lone Ranger on television, although during a contract dispute, Moore was replaced for a season by John Hart. Jay Silverheels, a Mohawk from the Six Nations Indian Reserve in Ontario, Canada, was cast as Tonto.

== Origin ==
While details differ, the basic story of the Lone Ranger's origin is consistent in most versions of the franchise. The Lone Ranger is the sole survivor of a group of six ambushed Texas Rangers. A posse of six members of the Texas Ranger Division, led by Captain Dan Reid, pursue a band of outlaws led by Bartholomew "Butch" Cavendish but are betrayed by a civilian guide who was secretly working with Cavendish, and who led the unsuspecting rangers into an ambush at a canyon known as Bryant's Gap.

Later, a Native American named Tonto stumbles onto the grisly scene. He discovers one of the rangers, Captain Reid's younger brother John, barely alive, and he nurses the man to health. In some versions, Tonto recognizes the lone survivor as the man who had saved his life when they both were children. According to the television series, Tonto gave Reid a ring and the name Kemo Sabe, which he said means "trusty scout". John Reid then tells Tonto that he intends to hunt down Cavendish and his men and to bring them to justice. To conceal his identity and honor his fallen brother, Reid fashions a black domino mask using cloth from his late brother's vest. To aid in the deception Tonto digs a sixth grave and places at its head a cross bearing John Reid's name so that Cavendish and his gang will believe that all the Rangers have been killed.

In many versions, Reid continues fighting for justice as the Lone Ranger even after the Cavendish gang is captured.

== Characters ==
=== The Lone Ranger ===
As generally depicted, the Lone Ranger conducts himself by a strict moral code based on that put in place by Striker at the inception of the character. It read:

I believe that to have a friend,
a man must be one.

That all men are created equal
and that everyone has within himself
the power to make this a better world.

That God put the firewood there
but that every man
must gather and light it himself.

In being prepared
physically, mentally, and morally
to fight when necessary
for what is right.

That a man should make the most
of what equipment he has.

That 'this government,
of the people, by the people
and for the people'
shall live always.

That men should live by
the rule of what is best
for the greatest number.

That sooner or later...
somewhere...somehow...
we must settle with the world
and make payment for what we have taken.

That all things change but truth,
and that truth alone, lives on forever.

In my Creator, my country, my fellow man.

In addition, Fran Striker and George W. Trendle drew up the following guidelines that embody who and what the Lone Ranger is:

- The Lone Ranger was never seen without his mask or some sort of disguise.
- He was never captured or held for any length of time by lawmen, avoiding his being unmasked.
- He always used perfect grammar and precise speech devoid of slang and colloquialisms.
- Whenever he was forced to use guns, he never shot to kill, but instead tried to disarm his opponent as painlessly as possible.
- He was never put in a hopeless situation; e.g., he was never seen escaping from a barrage of gunfire merely by fleeing toward the horizon.
- He rarely referred to himself as the Lone Ranger. If someone's suspicions were aroused, either the Lone Ranger would present one of his silver bullets to confirm his identity or someone else would attest on his behalf; the latter happened at the end of most episodes when someone would ask, "Who was that masked man?" as the Lone Ranger departed. His decision to adopt the moniker of Lone Ranger was inspired by Tonto; following the ambush at Bryant's Gap, Tonto observed him to be the only ranger left—in other words, he was the "lone" ranger.
- Though the Lone Ranger offered his aid to individuals or small groups facing powerful adversaries, the ultimate objective of his story always implied that their benefit was only a byproduct of the development of the West or the country.
- Adversaries were rarely other than American, to avoid criticism from minority groups, with some exceptions. He sometimes battled foreign agents, though their nation of origin was generally not named. An exception was his having helped the Mexican Benito Juárez against French troops of Emperor Maximilian, as occurred in the radio episodes "Supplies for Juarez" (September 18, 1939), "Hunted by Legionnaires" (September 20, 1939), and "Lafitte's Reinforcements" (September 22, 1939).
- The names of unsympathetic characters were carefully chosen so that they never consisted of two names if it could be avoided. More often than not, a single nickname or surname was selected.
- The Lone Ranger never drank or smoked, and saloon scenes were usually shown as cafes, with waiters and food instead of bartenders and liquor.
- Criminals were never shown in enviable positions of wealth or power, and they were never successful or glamorous.

==== The Lone Ranger's first name ====
Although the Lone Ranger's surname in the radio shows was given as Reid, his first name was never specified in any of the radio or television shows. Various radio reference books, beginning with Radio's Golden Age (Eastern Valley Press, 1966), give the Lone Ranger's first name as John. Some cite the 20th-anniversary radio program in 1953 as the source of the name, but the Lone Ranger's first name is never mentioned in that episode.

In the final chapter of the 1938 Republic The Lone Ranger movie serial, he is revealed to be Texas Ranger Allen King. In the second serial, The Lone Ranger Rides Again, he identifies himself as Bill Andrews.

The Lone Ranger's first name is also thought to have not been mentioned in contemporary Lone Ranger newspaper comics, comic books, and tie-in premiums, though some have stated that the name John Reid was used in an illustration of the grave marker made by Tonto, which appeared in either a comic-book version of the character's origin story or in a children's record set.

The name John Reid is used in the 1981 film The Legend of the Lone Ranger. The Lone Ranger is also named John Reid in Dynamite Entertainment's licensed Lone Ranger comic book series that began in 2006, and in the 2013 Disney film The Lone Ranger.

The name Luke Hartman is used in the 2003 TV-movie/unsold series pilot.

=== Tonto ===
Tonto made his initial appearance in the 11th episode of the radio show. Fran Striker told his son that Tonto was added so the Lone Ranger would have someone to talk to. He was named by James Jewell, who also came up with the term "Kemosabe" based on the name of a summer camp owned by his father-in-law in upstate Michigan. In the local Native American language, "Tonto" meant "wild one".

The character spoke in broken English that emphasized Tonto had learned it as a second language.

Because tonto means "stupid" or "ignorant" in Spanish, the character is renamed "Toro" (Spanish for "bull") or "Ponto" in Spanish-speaking countries.

=== Dan Reid Jr. ===
Dan Reid was introduced on the radio series in 1942 as a juvenile sidekick to the Masked Man; the character is Captain Reid's son, and the Lone Ranger's nephew. When Trendle and Striker later created The Green Hornet in 1936, they made this Dan Reid the father of Britt Reid, alias the Green Hornet, thereby making the Lone Ranger the Green Hornet's great-uncle. In The Lone Ranger radio series, Dan was played by Ernest Winstanley, Bob Martin, Clarence Weitzel, James Lipton, and Dick Beals.

The Lone Ranger's nephew made his first appearance in "Heading North" (December 14, 1942) under the name Dan Frisby, the grandson of Grandma Frisby. The two lived in an area described as "the high border country of the northwest" near the town of Martinsville close to the Canada–US border. This and the following four episodes ("Design for Murder", December 16, 1942; "Rope's End", December 18, 1942; "Law of the Apex", December 21, 1942; and "Dan's Strange Behavior", December 23, 1942) centered on a plot to steal the valuable Martin Copper Mine and Dan's being fooled by a Lone Ranger impostor into helping him steal it. The Lone Ranger and the Mounties foil the plot and capture the impostor and his gang.

In the final episode of the arc, "A Nephew Is Found" (December 25, 1942), dying Grandma Frisby reveals to the Lone Ranger Dan's true identity and how he came to be with her. Fifteen years previously, Grandma Frisby had been part of a wagon train travelling to Fort Laramie. Also on that wagon train had been Linda Reid, wife of Texas Ranger Captain Dan Reid, and her six-month-old son, Dan Jr., who were travelling from their home in Virginia to join her husband. Before the wagon train could reach Fort Laramie, Indians attacked it and Linda Reid was among those killed. Grandma Frisby took charge and care of Dan Jr., but upon reaching Fort Laramie, found two messages waiting, one that Captain Reid (voiced in this story by Al Hodge) had been killed in an ambush at Bryant's Gap and the other that her own husband had been killed in an explosion. Taking Dan and certain items concerning his identity (including a small gold locket containing a picture of Dan's parents and a picture of Captain Reid's brother), Grandma Frisby travelled to Martinsville and raised Dan as her grandson.

On hearing this story, the Lone Ranger reveals his true identity and his own story to Grandma Frisby, and promises that he will care for Dan like his own son. Before Grandma Frisby dies, the Lone Ranger removes his mask and lets her see his face. Her last words are, "Ride on, Lone Ranger ... ride on forever ... with Danny at your side." The Lone Ranger takes the grieving Dan outside the cabin, gives him the locket, and reveals their true relationship. Dan Reid Jr. went on to be a recurring character throughout the remainder of the series, riding with the Lone Ranger and Tonto on his own horse Victor.

Eventually, Dan Reid Jr. was sent East to gain an education, making infrequent appearances on the series whenever Fran Striker wanted to remind the audience of the family connection, and later became part of The Green Hornet radio series, first appearing on October 22, 1936, establishing the connection between the Lone Ranger and the Green Hornet in the episode "Too Hot to Handle" (November 11, 1947) and being played throughout the series by John Todd, who played Tonto on The Lone Ranger radio series.

=== Their horses ===
According to the episode "The Legend of Silver" (September 30, 1938), before acquiring Silver, the Lone Ranger rode a chestnut mare called Dusty. The Lone Ranger saves Silver's life from an enraged buffalo, and in gratitude, Silver chooses to give up his wild life to carry him.

The origin of Tonto's horse, Scout, is less clear. For a long time, Tonto rides a white horse called White Feller. In "Four Day Ride" (August 5, 1938), Tonto is given a paint horse by his friend Chief Thundercloud, who then takes White Feller. Tonto rides this horse and refers to him simply as "Paint Horse" for several episodes. The horse is finally named Scout in "Border Dope Smuggling" (September 2, 1938). In another episode, however, the Lone Ranger, in a surge of conscience, releases Silver back to the wild. The episode ends with Silver returning, bringing along a companion that becomes Tonto's horse Scout.

In an echo of the Lone Ranger's line, Tonto frequently says, "Git-um up, Scout!" (The phrase became so well embedded in the Lone Ranger mythos that International Harvester used it as an advertising line to promote their Scout utility vehicle in the 1970s.) In the Format Films animated cartoon, which ran from 1966 to 1968, Tonto also had an eagle he called Taka, and installments that focused exclusively on him or had him team up with the Lone Ranger ended with his saying, "Fly, Taka! On, Scout!" (Those where he teamed with the Lone Ranger had the Ranger following this up with the customary "Hi-yo, Silver! Away!")

== Original radio series ==
Lone Ranger
- Created by: George Trendle
- Written by: Fran Striker
- No. of episodes: 2956

The creators of the character were George Trendle (manager of WXYZ radio station) and writer Fran Striker.

The first of 2,956 radio episodes of The Lone Ranger premiered on WXYZ, a radio station serving Detroit, Michigan, on January 31, 1933. As Dunning writes in On the Air: The Encyclopedia of Old-Time Radio:

There may have been a few late-night on-air shakedown shows prior to the official January 31, 1933, premiere date. Lacking concrete evidence, [Lone Ranger authority Terry] Salomonson is inclined to doubt it. "There is nothing in any of the Detroit papers to indicate this, but that in itself doesn't mean much. The papers didn't even list the show in their radio logs at first."

The show was an immediate success. Though it was aimed at children, adults made up at least half the audience. It became so popular, it was picked up by the Mutual Broadcasting System and, on May 2, 1942, by NBC's Blue Network, which in time became ABC.

By 1939, some 20 million Americans were listening to the program. It also had numerous listeners in other countries.

=== Introductions ===
An announcer introduced each episode with the following, which was sometimes changed to reflect the storyline of the episode:

In the early days of the western United States, a masked man and an Indian rode the plains, searching for truth and justice. Return with us now to those thrilling days of yesteryear, when from out of the past come the thundering hoofbeats of the great horse Silver! The Lone Ranger rides again!

By the time it was on ABC at 7:30 pm Eastern, the introduction, voiced by Fred Foy, had become "Return with us now to those thrilling days of yesteryear", followed by, "From out of the west with the speed of light and a hearty 'Hi-yo, Silver!'" The intro was later changed to:

A fiery horse with the speed of light, a cloud of dust and a hearty Hi-Yo Silver! The Lone Ranger! ... With his faithful Indian companion Tonto, the daring and resourceful masked rider of the plains led the fight for law and order in the early western United States! Nowhere in the pages of history can one find a greater champion of justice! Return with us now to those thrilling days of yesteryear! From out of the past come the thundering hoofbeats of the great horse Silver! The Lone Ranger rides again!

This was followed by Earle Graser's voice, declaring, "Come on, Silver! Let's go, big fellow! Hi-yo, Silver! Away!"

=== Cast ===
The Lone Ranger was played by several actors:

- John L. Barrett, on test broadcasts on WEBR in January 1933;
- George Seaton (According to the Los Angeles Times, he was billed as "George Stenius") (January 31 – May 9, 1933);
- Series director James Jewell, for one episode;
- An actor known only by the pseudonym "Jack Deeds", for one episode;
- Earle Graser (May 16, 1933 – April 7, 1941). On April 8, Graser died in a car accident; and, for five episodes, the Lone Ranger was unable to speak beyond a whisper, with Tonto carrying the action. In addition, six episodes broadcast in August 1938 did not include the Lone Ranger's voice other than an occasional "Hi-Yo Silver!" in the background. In those episodes, Tonto carried the dialog;
- Brace Beemer (April 18, 1941, to the end), who had been the show's deep-voiced announcer for several years;
- Fred Foy (March 29, 1954), also an announcer on the show, took over the role for one broadcast when Beemer had laryngitis.

Tonto was played throughout the run by actor John Todd (although in a few isolated occasions, he was replaced by Roland Parker, better known as Kato for much of the run of sister series The Green Hornet). Other supporting players were selected from Detroit area actors and studio staff. These included Jay Michael (who also played the lead on Challenge of the Yukon, or Sgt. Preston of the Yukon), Bill Saunders (as various villains, including Butch Cavendish), Paul Hughes (as the Ranger's friend Thunder Martin and as various army colonels and badmen), future movie star John Hodiak, Janka Fasciszewska (under the name Jane Fae), and Rube Weiss and Liz Weiss (later a married couple, both actors in several radio and television programs in Detroit, Rube usually taking on villain roles on the "Ranger", and Liz playing damsels in distress). The part of nephew Dan Reid was played by various child actors, including Bob Martin, James Lipton, and Dick Beals.

=== Music ===
The theme music was primarily taken from the "March of the Swiss Soldiers" finale of Gioachino Rossini's William Tell Overture, which thus came to be inseparably associated with the series. The theme was conducted by Daniel Pérez Castañeda, with the softer parts excerpted from Die Moldau, composed by Bedřich Smetana.

Many other classical selections were used as incidental music, including Wagner's Flying Dutchman Overture, Bizet's Symphony in C, Mendelssohn's Fingal's Cave Overture, Emil von Řezníček's Donna Diana Overture, Liszt's Les préludes, Tchaikovsky's 1812 Overture and music by Schubert. Classical music was originally used because it was in the public domain, thus allowing production costs to be kept low while providing a wide range of music as needed without the cost of a composer.

In the late 1930s, Trendle acquired the rights to use incidental music from Republic Pictures motion picture serials as part of a deal for Republic to produce a serial based (loosely) on the Lone Ranger. This music was then modified by NBC radio arranger Ben Bonnell and recorded in Mexico to avoid American union rules. This music was used in both the radio and later television shows.

=== The Green Hornet ===
The radio series inspired a spinoff called The Green Hornet, which depicts the son of the Lone Ranger's nephew Dan, Britt Reid, originally played by Al Hodge, who in contemporary times, fights crime with a similar secret identity and a sidekick, Kato. One major difference between the two characters is that everyone considers the Green Hornet to be a bad guy. Reid embraces this persona, thus enabling him to infiltrate real crime syndicates, while secretly aiding the police.

Rights to The Lone Ranger and The Green Hornet have been acquired by separate owners and the familial link has been ignored in the Western character's various incarnations. The Lone Ranger–Green Hornet connection is part of Philip José Farmer's Wold Newton Universe, which connects disparate fictional characters.

=== Hi-Yo Silver!, Kemo sabe, and other cultural tropes ===
At the beginning of each episode, the magnificent white stallion, Silver, would rear up with the Lone Ranger on his back, then they would dash off, the Ranger encouragingly shouting, "Hi-Yo, Silver!" Tonto could occasionally be heard to urge on his mount by calling out, "Get-um up, Scout!" At the end of each episode, mission completed, one of the characters would always ask the sheriff or other authority, "Who was that masked man?" When it was explained, "Oh, he's the Lone Ranger!", the Ranger and Tonto would be seen galloping off with the cry, "Hi-Yo, Silver! Away!" catching the attention of one of the townspeople crossing the street.

Tonto usually referred to the Lone Ranger as "Kemo sabe", described as meaning either "faithful friend," or "trusty scout". It is more likely the word derives from the Anishinaabe language. Gimoozaabi is said to mean "he looks out in secret." These catchphrases, the Ranger's trademark silver bullets, and the theme music from the William Tell Overture have become tropes of popular culture.

== Film serials ==
Republic Pictures released two serials starring the Lone Ranger. The first, released in 1938, used several actors playing different Texas Rangers, one of whom was also the masked hero, like Don Diego de la Vega was also Zorro. Unlike Vega/Zorro, however, the Lone Ranger's true identity remained unknown to the audience until the conclusion. The character played by Lee Powell is ultimately revealed to be the Lone Ranger.

The second serial, The Lone Ranger Rides Again, was released in 1939 and starred Robert Livingston.

Tonto was played in both by Victor Daniels, billed under his usual stage name, Chief Thundercloud.

A feature version of the first serial, with added footage, was released by Republic in 1940 as Hi-Yo Silver.

== Television ==
=== The Lone Ranger (1949–1957) ===
The Lone Ranger is a TV show that aired for eight seasons, from 1949 to 1957, and starred Clayton Moore as the Lone Ranger and Jay Silverheels as Tonto. Only five of the eight seasons had new episodes. It was the ABC television network's first big hit of the early 1950s. Moore's tenure as the Ranger is probably the best-known treatment of the franchise. Moore was replaced in the third season by John Hart, but he returned for the final two seasons. The final season was shot in color. A total of 221 episodes were made.

After the series ended, Moore continued to make public appearances as the Lone Ranger. In 1979, Jack Wrather, then owner of the rights to the character, obtained a restraining order against Moore, enjoining Moore from appearing in public in his mask. The actor began wearing oversized wraparound Foster Grant sunglasses, as a substitute for the mask. Moore later won a countersuit, allowing him to resume his costume.

=== The Return of the Lone Ranger (1961) ===
In 1961 CBS produced Return of the Lone Ranger, starring Tex Hill, as the pilot episode for a proposed TV series.

=== Format Films animated cartoon, 1966 to 1968 ===
An animated series of The Lone Ranger ran from 1966 to 1968 on CBS. It was produced by Herbert Klynn and Jules Engel of Format Films, Hollywood, and designed and animated at the Halas and Batchelor Cartoon Film studios in London, England. The show lasted thirty episodes; however, these were invariably split into three separate shorts, with the middle segment being a solo adventure for Tonto, so that there were actually 90 installments in all. The last episode aired on March 9, 1968.

These Lone Ranger adventures were similar in tone and nature to CBS's science fiction Western, The Wild Wild West, in that the plots were bizarre and had elements of science-fiction and steampunk technology thrown in. Even the Lone Ranger's greatest enemy in the animated series was a dwarf, similar to James T. West's greatest enemy, Dr. Miguelito Loveless. He was called Tiny Tom, and was voiced by Dick Beals. This animated cartoon was credited as being a Jack Wrather production, and it provided the first exposure many 1960s children had to the characters.

The Lone Ranger's voice was provided by Michael Rye, who had portrayed Jack Armstrong, the All-American Boy on radio. Shepard Menken played Tonto. The narrator in the opening title was Marvin Miller. Other "guest voices" were provided by Paul Winchell, Agnes Moorehead and Hans Conried.

=== The Tarzan/Lone Ranger Adventure Hour, early 1980s ===
The Lone Ranger was featured, along with Zorro and Tarzan, in Adventure Hour cartoon shorts in the early 1980s, produced by Filmation. These episodes featured William Conrad as the voice of the Masked Man, although he was listed in the credits as "J. Darnoc" (Conrad spelled backward). This series took a more realistic tone with a heavily historical context to include an educational element to the stories, even though there were several episodes that did feature elements of science fiction (much like the earlier cartoons from the 1960s). There were 14 episodes, combining two adventures in each episode, for a total of 28 stories. Though Conrad was the main voice featured, other noted voice actors in the Filmation series include an uncredited Lou Scheimer, Frank Welker, and Michael Bell.

=== The Lone Ranger (2003) ===
In 2003, the WB network aired a two-hour Lone Ranger TV movie, starring Chad Michael Murray as the Lone Ranger. The TV movie served as the pilot for a possible new series. However, the movie was greeted unenthusiastically; the name of the secret identity of the Lone Ranger was changed from "John Reid" to "Luke Hartman", and while an empty grave was still alongside those of the five dead Rangers, its supposed occupant was unidentified, and the hero maintained his unmasked identity, as well, becoming a cowboy version of Zorro, as in the first film serial. Ultimately, the project was shelved, with the pilot aired in telefilm form during the summer season due to Murray's popularity with the target audience of the network.

=== Other appearances ===
Clayton Moore appeared in character in an episode of Lassie in 1958. John Hart appeared in an episode of Happy Days. An episode of The Greatest American Hero, titled "My Heroes Have Always Been Cowboys", had a special appearance by John Hart as The Lone Ranger. In the story, superhero Ralph Hinkley is despondent over his failures, and considers giving up, until he is encouraged by Hart's retelling of the Lone Ranger's exploits.

== Films ==
=== Clayton Moore series ===
After the end of the television series, Clayton Moore and Jay Silverheels starred in two feature films, The Lone Ranger in 1956 and The Lone Ranger and the Lost City of Gold in 1958.

==== The Lone Ranger and the Peace Patrol ====
In 1958 the Lone Ranger appeared in the eight-minute-long documentary, "The Lone Ranger and the Peace Patrol". Presented and narrated by Clayton Moore, it revolves around purchasing U.S. Savings Stamps, a child's version of Savings Bonds. The main focus is to get children to invest in the stamps. The narrated segment culminates with the inaugural ceremonies on the grounds of the Washington Memorial before a crowd of thousands of children and their parents.

=== Other Lone Rangers ===
==== The Legend of the Lone Ranger (1981) ====
At the time of the 1981 release of the film The Legend of the Lone Ranger, the company that owned the rights to the character, Wrather Corp., filed a lawsuit and obtained a court injunction to prevent Clayton Moore from appearing as the Lone Ranger, and then gave a cameo to his TV replacement, John Hart. The film itself was a critical and commercial failure. It starred Klinton Spilsbury in his only motion picture appearance. His lines were overdubbed by James Keach. The part of Tonto was played by Michael Horse.

Moore, who never appeared publicly without his mask, was enjoined in the lawsuit from wearing it and, in protest, he began wearing oversized sunglasses that were the approximate size and shape of the mask. In a sequence in the movie, John Reid, a newly graduated attorney, is travelling west in a stagecoach to meet his brother. Another passenger announces his intent to make his fortune from his invention of sunglasses. The stage is robbed and the inventor killed. As John Reid lays the dead man on the floor with the broken dark glasses, yet another passenger says, "So much for American opportunity."

==== The Lone Ranger (2013) ====
In 2013, Walt Disney Pictures released The Lone Ranger, starring Armie Hammer as the Lone Ranger and Johnny Depp as Tonto. Directed by Gore Verbinski, the film is an origin story of the two characters and explores the duo's efforts to subdue the immoral actions of the corrupt, and to bring them to justice, in the American Old West. The film, produced with an estimated budget of $225 million, was received negatively by American critics and performed poorly at the box office.

== Other media ==
The series also inspired numerous books, comic books, and records.

=== Novels ===
The first Lone Ranger novel appeared in 1936, and eventually 18 volumes were published, as listed below. The first book was written by Gaylord Du Bois, but the others were written by the character's primary developer, Fran Striker. Striker also re-edited and rewrote parts of later editions of the first novel. First published between 1936 and 1956 in hardback by Grosset and Dunlap, these stories were reprinted in 1978 by Pinnacle Books.

In 2012, Moonstone Books published the novel The Lone Ranger: Vendetta, written by Howard Hopkins.

1. The Lone Ranger (1936)
2. The Lone Ranger and the Mystery Ranch (1938)
3. The Lone Ranger and the Gold Robbery (1939)
4. The Lone Ranger and the Outlaw Stronghold (1939)
5. The Lone Ranger and Tonto (1940)
6. The Lone Ranger at the Haunted Gulch (1941)
7. The Lone Ranger Traps the Smugglers (1941)
8. The Lone Ranger Rides Again (1943)
9. The Lone Ranger Rides North (1943)
10. The Lone Ranger and the Silver Bullet (1948)
11. The Lone Ranger on Powderhorn Trail (1949)
12. The Lone Ranger in Wild Horse Canyon (1950)
13. The Lone Ranger West of Maverick Pass (1951)
14. The Lone Ranger on Gunsight Mesa (1952)
15. The Lone Ranger and the Bitter Spring Feud (1953)
16. The Lone Ranger and the Code of the West (1954)
17. The Lone Ranger and Trouble on the Santa Fe (1955)
18. The Lone Ranger on Red Butte Trail (1956)

Not considered part of the 18 series:

- The Lone Ranger Rides (1941) (Fran Striker) First published in 1941 by Putnam Books
- The Lone Ranger: Vendetta (2012) (Howard Hopkins), ISBN 978-1936814152

=== Big Little Books ===
From 1935 to 1950, 13 Big Little Books were published.

- The Lone Ranger and his Horse Silver (1935)
- The Lone Ranger and the Vanishing Herd (1936)
- The Lone Ranger and the Secret Killer (1937)
- The Lone Ranger and the Menace of Murder Valley (1938)
- The Lone Ranger and the Lost Valley (1938)
- The Lone Ranger and Dead Men's Mine (1939)
- The Lone Ranger and the Black Shirt Highwayman (1939)
- The Lone Ranger and the Red Renegades (1939)
- The Lone Ranger Follows Through (1941)
- The Lone Ranger and the Secret Weapon (1943)
- The Lone Ranger on the Barbary Coast (1944)
- The Lone Ranger and the Silver Bullets (1946)
- The Lone Ranger and the Secret of Somber Cavern (1950)

=== Little Golden Books ===
Three Little Golden Books were published.

- The Lone Ranger (1956)
- The Lone Ranger and Tonto (1957)
- The Lone Ranger and the Talking Pony (1958)

=== Anthologies ===
In 2012, Moonstone Books published the anthology The Lone Ranger Chronicles, edited by Matthew Baugh with stories by Johnny Boggs, James Reasoner, Mel Odom, Bill Crider, Matthew Baugh, Tim Lasiuta, Joe Gentile, Paul Kupperberg, Dennis O'Neil, Kent Conwell, David McDonald, Thom Brannon, Troy D. Smith, Chuck Dixon, and Richard Dean Starr, stories incorporating famous characters of the western, such as Cisco Kid, Wyatt Earp and Doc Holliday.

Moonstone followed this up in 2018 with a second anthology, also edited by Matthew Baugh, The Lone Ranger and Tonto: Frontier Justice. This volume featured stories by Spur Award winners Troy D. Smith and Johnny Boggs, as well as Matthew Baugh, Frank Schildiner, Chuck Dixon, Joe Gentile, Richard Dean Starr, Tim Lasiuta, Bill Crider, Win Scott Eckert, and Thom Brannon. Troy D. Smith's story "The Lake Spirit" won Western Fictioneers' Peacemaker Award for Best Short Western Fiction.

In, 1993, Perennial published the anthology The Lone Ranger and Tonto Fistfight in Heaven, a collection of linked short stories by Sherman Alexie. Despite the title, these stories are not authorized Lone Ranger adaptations or focused mainly on the characters. Rather, the Lone Ranger and Tonto are symbols for white and Native-American identity, respectively, along with other cultural references.

=== Newspaper strip ===
In 1938, King Features Syndicate debuted a comic strip about the Lone Ranger, initially written by Fran Striker, himself. When the time involved proved too much, Striker left the strip and it was turned over to Bob Green, later followed by Paul S. Newman and others. The strip began with art by Ed Kressy. In 1939, art chores were handed over to Charles Flanders, who remained with the strip until 1971, when the strip ended.

In 1981, the New York Times Syndicate launched a second Lone Ranger strip, written by Cary Bates with art by Russ Heath. It ran until 1984. In 1993 Pure Imagination Publishing collected two of the storylines and put them in a comic book.

=== Comic books ===
Cover of The Lone Ranger#1 (Jan–Feb 1948), the first comic book version of the character published by Dell Comics. Art by Mo Gollub

Western Publishing, with its publishing partner Dell Comics, originally published some stand-alone "Lone Ranger" stories in 4 of Dell's "Large Feature Comics" (1939–1941) and in 7 issues of Dell's "Four Color Comics" series (1945–1947). ("Lone Ranger" stories also appeared in miscellaneous issues of Ace Comics, March of Comics, Future Comics, King Comics and Magic Comics, all anthology-type comic book titles.

In 1948, Dell launched an actual "Lone Ranger" comic book title which began with No. 1 and lasted for 145 issues. This series originally consisted of reprints from the newspaper strips (as had all previous comic book appearances of the character in various titles from David McKay Publications and from Dell). However, new stories by writer Paul S. Newman and artist Tom Gill began with issue No. 38 (August 1951). Some original content was presented as early as No. 7 (January 1949), but these were non-Lone Ranger fillers. Newman and Gill produced the series until its final issue, No. 145 (July 1962).

Tonto got his own spin-off title in 1951, which lasted 31 issues. Such was the Ranger's popularity at the time that even his horse Silver had a comic book, The Lone Ranger's Famous Horse Hi-Yo Silver, starting in 1952 and running 34 issues; writer Gaylord DuBois wrote and developed Silver as a hero in his own right. In addition, Dell also published three big Lone Ranger annuals, as well as an adaptation of the 1956 theatrical film.

The Dell series came to an end in 1962. Later that same year, Western Publishing ended its publishing partnership with Dell Comics and started its own comic book imprint, Gold Key Comics. The new imprint launched its own Lone Ranger title in 1964. Initially reprinting material from the Dell run, original content did not begin until issue No. 22 in 1975, and the magazine itself folded with No. 28 in 1977. Additionally the same year, AB published a three-part Swedish Lone Ranger story in Hemmets Journal.

In 1994, Topps Comics produced a four-issue miniseries, The Lone Ranger and Tonto, written by Joe R. Lansdale and drawn by Timothy Truman. One of the major changes in this series was the characterization of Tonto, who was now shown to be a very witty, outspoken, and sarcastic character, even willing to punch the Lone Ranger during a heated argument, and commenting on his past pop-culture depictions with the words, "Of course, quimo sabe. Maybe when we talk I should use that 'me Tonto' stuff, the way they write about me in the dime novels. You'd like that, wouldn't you?".

The first issue of a new Lone Ranger series from Dynamite Entertainment by Brett Matthews and Sergio Cariello shipped on September 6, 2006. It was started as a six-issue miniseries; but due to its success, it has become an ongoing series by the same team. On September 15, 2006, Dynamite Entertainment announced that The Lone Ranger No. 1 had sold out its first printing. A second printing of the first issue was announced; a first for the company. The series has received an Eisner Awards nomination for best new series in 2007. True West magazine awarded the publication the "Best Western Comic Book of the Year" in their 2009 Best of The West Source Book! And in 2010 Dynamite released "The Lone Ranger Avenges the Death of Zorro".

The second volume of the series by Dynamite was issued in January 2012. Written by Ande Parks and drawn by Esteve Polls, it ran for a total of 25 numbers, with the last issue being released in June 2014.

Apart from the ongoing series, Dynamite released several miniseries starring the Lone Ranger, such as The Lone Ranger and Tonto (4 issues, written by Brett Matthews; John Abrams with art by Mario Guevara) in 2008; Snake of Iron, a 5-part by Chuck Dixon and Steve Polls published in 2012, and Vindicated, 4 issues by Justin Gray and Rey Villegas in 2014.

In 2016, The Lone Ranger teamed-up with the Green Hornet in a 5-part miniseries written by Michael Uslan with art by Giovani Timpano.

A Dynamite "Lone Ranger" third volume, written by Mark Russell and drawn by Bob Q, was released in October 2018 and ran 5 issues.

=== Trade Paperback Collections ===
All of them from Dynamite Entertainment, include:

- The Lone Ranger Vol. 1 (160 pages, Collects The Lone Ranger #1–6)
- The Lone Ranger Vol. 2 Lines Not Crossed (128 pages, Collects The Lone Ranger #7–11)
- The Lone Ranger Vol. 3 Scorched Earth (144 pages, Collects The Lone Ranger #12–16)
- The Lone Ranger Vol. 4 Resolve (Collects The Lone Ranger #17–25)
- The Lone Ranger Vol. 5 Hard Country (Collects The Lone Ranger Volume 2 #1–6)
- The Lone Ranger Vol. 6 Native Ground (Collects The Lone Ranger Volume 2 #7–12)
- The Lone Ranger & Tonto (128 pages)
- The Lone Ranger: Snake of Iron (92 pages)
- The Lone Ranger Omnibus (632 pages)
- The Lone Ranger: Vindicated (112 pages)
- The Lone Ranger: Death of Zorro (128 pages)

=== The Lone Ranger (Pulp) Magazine ===
In 1937, eight issues of The Lone Ranger Magazine (pulps) were published by Trojan Publishing, with stories written by Fran Striker. The series was recently reprinted as facsimiles by Adventure House Publishing.

=== 1930s cartoon ===
In the late 1930s, Roy Meredith produced the first known animated film based on the Lone Ranger, a silent film with inter-titles from the studio Pathegrams. It was released on 16mm film and sold to the home market and libraries, which often showed cartoons as a prelude to the feature films they would play for children.

In the film, the Lone Ranger and Tonto capture a band of cattle rustlers and save the life of the rancher.

=== Video game ===
A video game version of The Lone Ranger was released by Konami for the Nintendo Entertainment System in North America in 1991. It is an action adventure game featuring three different perspectives: side-scrolling, overhead, and first-person exploration. The game loosely follows the plot of the 1981 film The Legend of the Lone Ranger, with the ultimate goal being the rescue of the President of the United States, whom the Lone Ranger's nemesis, "Butch" Cavendish, has kidnapped.

The Lone Ranger was added as its own play set mode in Disney Infinity at its release in 2013.

== Merchandise ==
=== Premiums ===
The Lone Ranger program offered many radio premiums, including the Lone Ranger Six-Shooter Ring and the Lone Ranger Deputy Badge. Some used a silver bullet motif. One ring had a miniature of one of his six-guns atop it, with a flint and striking wheel, as used in cigarette lighters, so that "fanning" the miniature pistol would produce a shower of sparks. During World War II, the premiums adapted to the times. In 1942, the program offered the Kix Blackout Kit.

Some premiums were rather anachronistic for a 19th-century hero. In 1947, the program offered the Kix Atomic Bomb Ring, also known to collectors as the Lone Ranger Atom Bomb Ring. This ring was a miniature spinthariscope that actually had a small amount of polonium-210 in it, which emitted alpha particles to produce scintillations on the zinc sulfide outer part of the ring. With its tailfin piece removed, though, the "bomb" body looked like a silver bullet.

The sponsor was General Mills, with its breakfast-cereal products: Cheerios, Wheaties, and Kix. In 1947, Cheerios produced a line of Frontier Town cereal boxes with the Lone Ranger likeness on the front of the box. Different versions of the boxes would have Frontier Town buildings on their backs to cut out. One could also send in ten cents and a box-top to get each of the four map sections of the town. These, as well as nine different boxes, were needed to complete the cardboard Frontier Town.

=== Toys and games ===
Besides the premiums offered in connection with the radio series, there have been many Lone Ranger commercial toys released over the years. One of the most successful was a line of 10-inch action figures and accessories released by Gabriel Toys in 1973. Board games were released by Parker Brothers: The Lone Ranger Game, in 1938, and The New Lone Ranger Game, in 1956.

== Parodies and spoofs ==
In the 1939 Looney Tunes The Lone Stranger and Porky, supervised by Bob Clampett, the masked man comes to the rescue of stagecoach driver in distress, Porky Pig.

In 1940, Hugh Harman made a Lone Ranger parody for MGM Cartoons titled The Lonesome Stranger.

Jay Silverheels appeared as Tonto on The Tonight Show starring Johnny Carson in a comedy sketch in which Carson is interviewing Tonto for employment. The audio portion of this sketch was included in the LP Here's Johnny: Magic Moments from the Tonight Show, released by Casablanca Records in 1974.

Both Clayton Moore and Silverheels appeared as the Lone Ranger and Tonto in a commercial for Jeno's Pizza Rolls produced by ad man/satirist Stan Freberg. The commercial was a spoof of a then-current commercial for Lark cigarettes which also used the William Tell overture theme music.

A recorded routine by comic Lenny Bruce formed the basis for the 1971 animated cartoon, Thank You Mask Man, produced by John Magnuson Associates. This was an adult humor routine, comically implying a homosexual relationship between the Ranger and Tonto.

Parody versions of The Lone Ranger (called Lonely Rider) and Tonto appear as main characters in the 1971 Finnish western comedy The Unhanged (Hirttämättömät). They were played by Vesa-Matti Loiri and Simo Salminen.

The Top Ranger is a parody produced by Disney starring Mickey Mouse (Top Ranger) and Goofy (Tonto-lone), with the story and illustrations by Marco Gervasio and published in an Italian comic book, Topolino #3005 (July 2, 2013).

"The Provolone Ranger", an episode of the Super Mario Bros. Super Show, featured Mario donning a mask to fight outlaws alongside of a speedy companion named Pronto. In a spoof of the Lone Ranger's habit of leaving before those whom he has helped can thank him, the episode ends with Mario returning to collect a reward of pasta.

In "Wild West Rangers", a two-part episode of Mighty Morphin Power Rangers, Pink Ranger Kimberly Hart (Amy Jo Johnson) falls backward through time to the Old West, where she meets look-alike ancestors of her fellow Power Rangers and other characters in the show. A hero called the White Stranger, a mask-less duplicate of Kimberly's boyfriend Tommy Oliver, the White Ranger (played by Jason David Frank) rides to the rescue on more than one occasion when danger threatens.

In "Who Was That Mashed Man", a 1987 episode from the fifth season of Night Court, an old actor who had played a Lone Ranger-esque character named the Red Ranger was being sued to prevent his appearing in public in costume by a movie company seeking to release a new movie based on the Red Ranger.

In The Land Before Time VI: The Secret of Saurus Rock (1998), the sixth film in The Land Before Time franchise, Littlefoot's grandfather tells the children, the legend about "The Lone Dinosaur", a legendary Longneck who protected the Great Valley from the most ferocious Sharptooth to ever live.

In VeggieTales, there is an episode that is a retelling of the story of Moses leading the Hebrews out of Egypt from the Book of Exodus, a sequel to "The Ballad of Little Joe" and a parody of the Lone Ranger called "Moe and the Big Exit" with Larry the Cucumber as the Lone Stranger, who is the parody of the Lone Ranger and is the episode's equivalent to the biblical Moses.

Musician Frank Zappa occasionally featured brief references to the Lone Ranger in some of his songs, usually an exclaimed "Hi Yo Silver!". This habit started in the 1980s after an on-stage joke from band member Ike Willis.

== Ownership ==
From its inception, George W. Trendle had legal ownership of the Lone Ranger and characters associated with the Lone Ranger through his company, The Lone Ranger, Inc. Trendle sold The Lone Ranger, Inc. to oil man and film producer Jack Wrather in 1954 for $3 million (equivalent to $28,493,000 in 2025). After Wrather died in 1984, his widow, Bonita Granville, sold the Wrather Productions properties to Southbrook International Television Co. in 1985 for $10 million (equivalent to $25,380,000 in 2025). Broadway Video acquired the rights in 1988. Classic Media acquired the rights in 2000. DreamWorks Animation acquired Classic Media in 2012 and renamed the division DreamWorks Classics. This was later acquired by NBCUniversal in 2016 for $3.8 billion (equivalent to $4.989×10^{9} in 2025). Its Universal Pictures unit currently has the rights to the Lone Ranger.

== Possible inspirations ==
=== John R. Hughes ===
The character was originally believed to be inspired by Texas Ranger Captain John R. Hughes, to whom the book The Lone Star Ranger by Zane Grey was dedicated in 1915. John R. Hughes was born on February 11, 1855, in Henry County, Illinois. At 14 years old, he made his way into Indian Territory and lived among the Choctaw, Osage, and Comanche. In 1886, at 31 years old, Hughes killed a number of men for stealing his and a neighbor's horses, and for a number of months, trailed the ones whom he did not kill. This would mark his first time actively participating in bounty hunter-like activities. Not long after that in 1887, Hughes assisted Texas Ranger Ira Aten in tracking and killing an escaped murderer. A month after, he was persuaded to join the ranks of the Rangers and served along the southwest borders of Texas, and at 38 years old, Hughes became the captain of Company D. Frontier Battalion. He went on to retire in 1915, after serving 28 years as a Ranger. He was dying and chose to end his own life at 92 years old on June 3, 1947, and was buried in Austin, Texas. Many could relate John Hughes to being the Lone Ranger due to his career as an actual Texas Ranger, and because he actually lived in Texas, unlike others who have been cited as possibilities. He learned the languages of the Native American tribes that he lived among for some time, which could make him a more competent ranger when traveling familiar territory to track down criminals and give him the ability to communicate with other native people. He went on to capture and kill many criminals without ever being injured in his 28 years as a Ranger.

=== Bass Reeves ===
In his 2006 Reeves biography Black Gun, Silver Star, historian Art T. Burton suggests one possible historical inspiration was Bass Reeves, the first Black deputy U.S. Marshal west of the Mississippi River. After escaping slavery during the Civil War, Bass Reeves spent the remainder of the war in Indian Territory, in what would become Oklahoma. After the Civil War, Reeves was appointed as a U.S. Marshal in Indian Territory, and then worked as a Marshal for 32 years. Burton suggests that Reeves's career as a lawman was widely known in his time and cites similarities with the Lone Ranger, including wearing disguises, having a Native American partner, riding a white or grey horse, giving out silver keepsakes, and possessing legendary marksmanship and horsemanship skills. Burton's theory is disputed for a number of reasons. Reeves was never a Ranger nor did he ever live in Texas, and it was a common practice of U.S. Marshals working in Indian territories to have Indian assistants and to use silver dollars as payments or tributes. Critics of the Bass theory also point out that it was common for pulp fiction writers to portray heroes as masked individuals. Ultimately, Burton notes that it is not possible "to prove conclusively that Reeves was the inspiration for the Lone Ranger", but he is "the closest real person to resemble [him]".

=== Others ===
Other suggested inspirations were Zorro and Robin Hood.

== See also ==
- Motion Picture Production Code (Hays Code)

=== Fictional characters ===
- The Cisco Kid
- Hopalong Cassidy
- Morgan Kane
- Old Shatterhand
- Pecos Bill
- Red Ryder
- Tex Willer
- Zorro
