= Carroll Carroll =

American humorist and writer (1902–1991)

- Born: Carroll S. Weinschenk; April 11, 1902; New York City, U.S.
- Died: February 5, 1991 (aged 88); Los Angeles, California, U.S.
- Occupations: Advertising executive, humorist, writer
- Years active: 1920s-1985
- Spouse: Norma Tobias Carroll (m. 1930s-1986; her death)
- Children: 3

Carroll S. Weinschenk (April 11, 1902–February 5, 1991), known professionally as Carroll Carroll, was an American advertising executive, humorist and, most notably, a writer for comedians.

The highlights of Carroll's writing career was during the 1930s and 1940s. During that time period, he served as head writer for some of the biggest names in entertainment and the most popular radio shows of the time including Bing Crosby (Kraft Music Hall), Burns and Allen (The Burns and Allen Show), Eddie Cantor, Edgar Bergen (both hosts of The Chase and Sanborn Hour), Rudy Vallee (The Fleischmann's Yeast Hour), Guy Lombardo and Milton Berle (Texaco Star Theater).

Carroll is credited as the writer who helped, in part, shaped Bing Crosby's jovial easygoing radio persona.

== Early life and career ==
Carroll was born Carroll Weinschenk on April 11, 1902, in New York City. He dropped out of high school and began writing movie reviews and contributing features for several magazines and newspapers, including The New Yorker, The Saturday Evening Post, New York World and the New York Evening Sun. He eventually found work with the radio department of the J. Walter Thompson Advertising Agency in 1932.

During his time at J. Walter Thompson, he began writing comic material for Burns and Allen, Rudy Vallee, Eddie Cantor, Bert Lahr and Al Jolson. Also during his time there, he wrote for Lux Radio Theatre and The Chase and Sanborn Hour and created Bing Crosby's Kraft Music Hall.

He left the ad agency in 1946, and moved out west to Hollywood, where he joined the Ward Wheelock Company. While at Ward Wheelock, Carroll became the west coast vice president and writer in charge of such radio shows as Meet Corliss Archer, Double or Nothing and Bob Crosby’s Club Fifteen.

Carroll made the move to television in 1953, working on Bob Crosby’s daytime television variety program, The Bob Crosby Show, on CBS. He also worked on several shows for NBC and 20th Century Fox Television.

Carroll went back to New York, and returned to J. Walter Thompson as an editorial consultant in 1957. He stayed there for 11 years. He would return to Southern California in 1972.

He subsequently wrote his autobiography, None Of Your Business, as well as ghosting autobiographies for Liberace, Ed McMahon, Mike Douglas and Henny Youngman. Earlier, Carroll had ghosted Bob Hope’s I Never Left Home and So This Is Peace. Carroll’s last book, Life Is A Fortune Cookie, was published in 1981.

Carroll also wrote for Variety for eighteen years with a humorous television critique advertising column entitled And Now A Word From....

== Personal life and death ==
While working at J. Walter Thompson, Carroll met and married secretary Norma Tobias. His eldest son, Bruce Carroll, was a producer with ABC News for 28 years. His youngest son Adam was a production manager for Walt Disney Educational Media, and his daughter Leda Goldsmith also served as an executive for J. Walter Thompson. Carroll and Norma also had three grandchildren together. Norma died on June 11, 1986 at age 77. The two were married for more than 50 years.

Carroll Carroll died on Tuesday February 5, 1991 in his home in Hollywood. The official cause of death was listed as congestive heart failure. Carroll was 88 years old.

== Television work ==
Year	Title	Role	Notes
1953	The Bob Crosby Show	Writer	
1955	The Easter Seal Teleparade of Stars	Writer	Additional dialogue TV special
1955	Tonight Starring Steve Allen	Writer	
1955	Ford Star Jubilee	Writer	
1956	Lux Video Theatre	Writer	
