= Jim Ameche =

American actor (1915–1983)

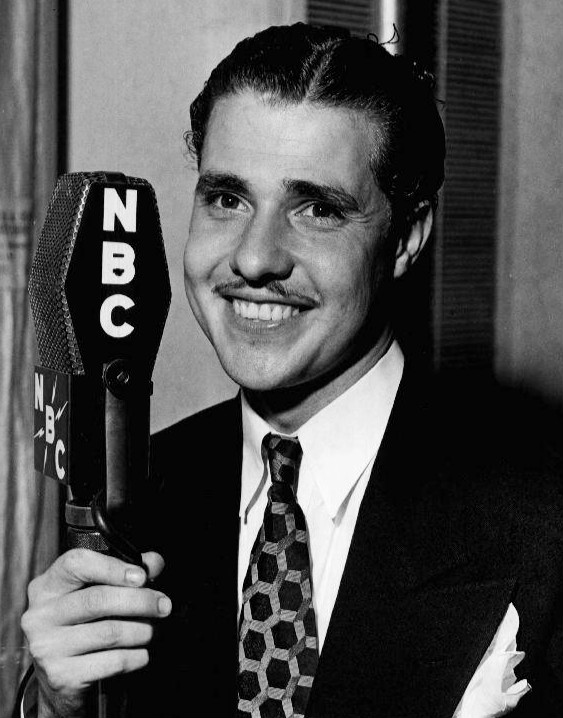
- Jim Ameche in 1940.
- Born: James Amici; August 6, 1915; Kenosha, Wisconsin
- Died: February 4, 1983 (aged 67); Tucson, Arizona
- Occupation: Actor
- Years active: 1951–1957
- Spouse: Elizabeth A. Harris (m. 1936)
- Children: 6
- Parent(s): Felice Amici; Barbara Etta Amici
- Relatives: Don Ameche (brother)

Jim Ameche (August 6, 1915 – February 4, 1983) was an American radio actor who is most notable for his role as radio's original Jack Armstrong on Jack Armstrong, the All-American Boy.

== Career ==
Born James Amici in Kenosha, Wisconsin,. When his elder brother, Don, left his position as the host and announcer for The Chase and Sanborn Hour in the early 1940s, Jim took over for the remainder of the show's run. He also was heard as mountie Jim West on ABC's Silver Eagle (1951–55). Other shows Ameche was heard on included Grand Hotel, Hollywood Playhouse, and Big Sister. In the 1940s, he had several programs on WGN radio in Chicago.

He was heard on stations in Los Angeles and Palm Springs in the late 1950s and early 60s. For many years he was a popular local radio personality in the New York City area. By the late 1960s, he was working as an announcer on New York's WHN and the TV pitchman for a Longines Symphonette Society mail-order record album featuring clips of old-time radio broadcasts. In the 1960s he also read radio advertisements for Gibson wines. For many years, he was the afternoon announcer on WQXR, the classical radio station of The New York Times. He also recorded numerous radio ads in Phoenix, Arizona in his later years.

== Film ==
He portrayed Alexander Graham Bell in the 1957 film The Story of Mankind, a role his brother Don played in 1939's The Story of Alexander Graham Bell.

== Family ==
Jim Ameche married Elizabeth "Betty" A. Harris of Oak Park, Illinois in 1936. The couple had six children. Alan Ameche, the professional football player, was a cousin of Jim.

== Death ==
Jim Ameche died February 4, 1983, of lung cancer at Tucson Medical Center at age 67.
