= Hollywood Playhouse =

Radio anthology drama series

- Other names: Woodbury Hollywood Playhouse
- Genre: Anthology drama
- Running time: 30 minutes
- Home station: NBC Blue Network; NBC Red Network
- Hosted by: Tyrone Power; Charles Boyer; Herbert Marshall
- Original release: October 3, 1937 – December 25, 1940

Hollywood Playhouse, also known as Woodbury Hollywood Playhouse, is a radio anthology drama series that featured adaptations of plays and short stories. Created as a showcase for Tyrone Power, the series began October 3, 1937, on the Blue Network, with Darryl F. Zanuck introducing his 20th Century-Fox star. The half-hour program aired Sundays at 9 p.m. ET until September 1939, when it was moved to the NBC Red Network Wednesdays at 8 pm ET. Woodbury Soap and Jergens Lotion sponsored the show.

Charles Boyer starred in the second season. He left in 1939 to make a film in France, and briefly joined the French army when World War II broke out in Europe. Herbert Marshall succeeded Boyer on Hollywood Playhouse for nine weeks, and he was replaced by Gale Page and Jim Ameche until Boyer returned on the January 3, 1940, broadcast. Page and Ameche headed a summer version of the program titled Promoting Priscilla (July–October 1940).

Weekly guest stars included Florence Rice, Joan Blondell and Margaret Sullavan. Harry Sosnik provided the music. The series continued until December 25, 1940.

== Preservation status ==
Only one broadcast of Hollywood Playhouse – "The Sub-Lieutenant" (May 29, 1940), starring Charles Boyer and Margaret Lindsay – is known to survive in radio collections.

== See also ==
- Academy Award Theater
- Author's Playhouse
- The Campbell Playhouse
- Cavalcade of America
- CBS Radio Workshop
- The Dreft Star Playhouse
- Ford Theatre
- General Electric Theater
- Lux Radio Theater
- The Mercury Theatre on the Air
- Screen Director's Playhouse
- Suspense
- Theater Guild on the Air
