= Tonto =

Fictional Native American hero

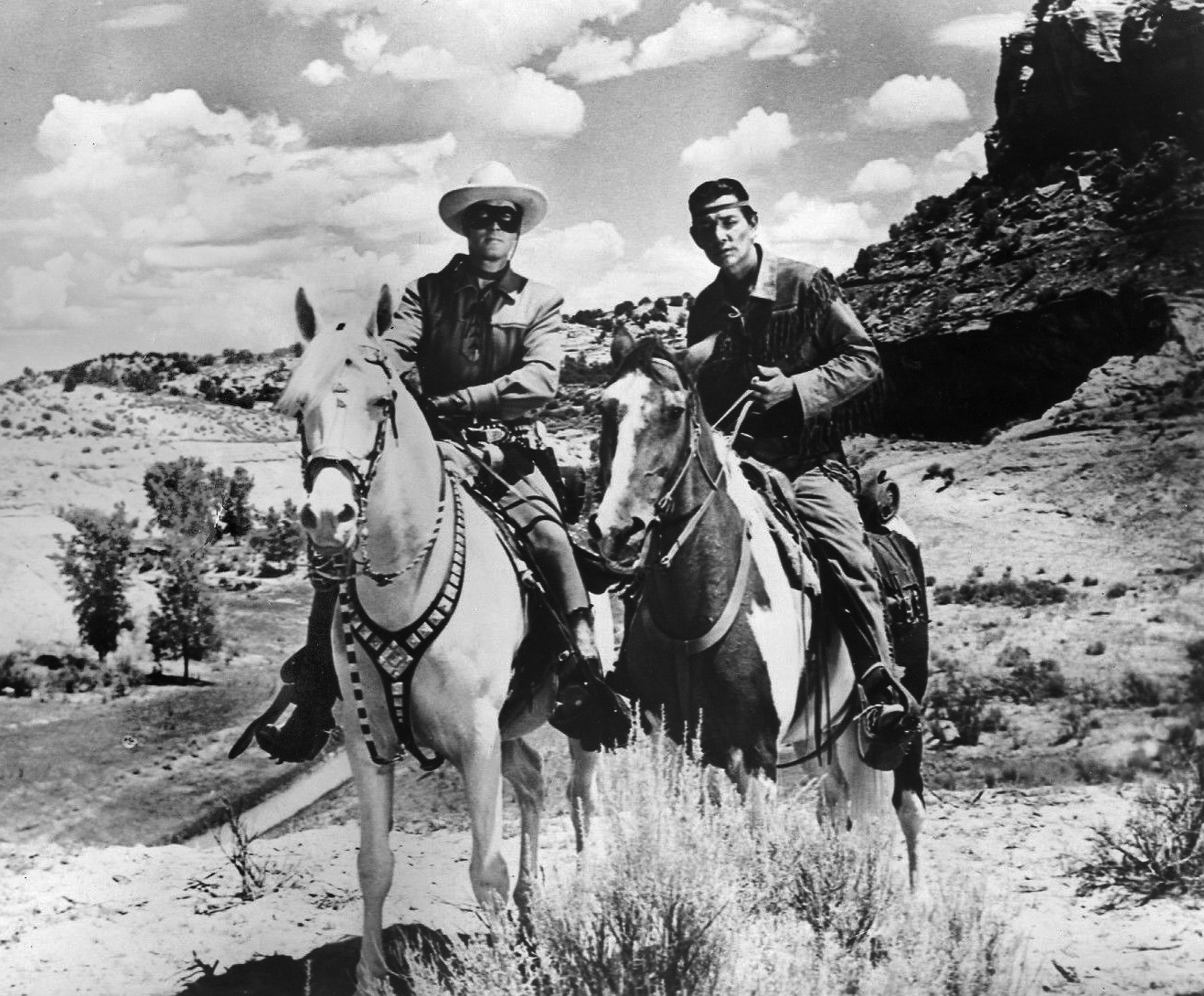
- Jay Silverheels (right) as Tonto with Clayton Moore as the Lone Ranger in the TV adaptation

Publication information
- First appearance: WXYZ radio; Detroit, Michigan, US; February 25, 1933
- Created by: Fran Striker; George W. Trendle

In-story information
- Partnerships: The Lone Ranger
- Abilities: Expert marksman and horseman Trained hand-to-hand combatant

Tonto is a fictional character; he is the Native American (either Tonto Apache, Comanche, or Potawatomi) companion of the Lone Ranger, a popular American Western character created by George W. Trendle and Fran Striker. Tonto has appeared in radio and television series and other presentations of the characters' adventures righting wrongs in the 19th-century western United States.

Tonto made his first appearance on the 11th episode of the radio show, which originated on the Detroit, Michigan, radio station WXYZ. Though he became well known as the Lone Ranger's friend, Tonto was originally created just so the Lone Ranger would have someone to talk to. Throughout the radio run (which spanned 21 years), with only a few exceptions, Tonto was played by American actor John Todd.

Chief Thundercloud played the character in the Republic movie serials The Lone Ranger and The Lone Ranger Rides Again. To this point, Tonto had been depicted, on the radio series, as a somewhat elderly sidekick. This serial established the better-remembered image of Tonto as a handsome young tribal warrior in buckskins. The only diversion from this image since then has been Johnny Depp's depiction in Disney's 2013 film, The Lone Ranger, the most recent portrayal.

Jay Silverheels portrayed the arguably best-remembered version in The Lone Ranger television series. This was the highest-rated television program on the ABC network in the early 1950s and its first true "hit".

Ivan Naranjo, a Blackfoot/Southern Ute actor from Colorado, voiced the character in The Tarzan/Lone Ranger Adventure Hour.

Michael Horse portrayed Tonto in the film The Legend of the Lone Ranger (1981).

== Character ==
Tonto made his first appearance on the 11th episode of the radio show The Lone Ranger. Two conflicting origin stories have been given for the character Tonto and how he came to work with the Lone Ranger. As originally presented, in the December 7, 1938 radio broadcast, Reid had already been well established as the Lone Ranger when he met Tonto. In that episode Cactus Pete, a friend of the Lone Ranger, tells the story of how the masked man and Tonto first met. According to that tale, Tonto had been caught in the explosion when two men dynamited a gold mine they were working. One of the men wanted to kill the wounded Tonto, but the Lone Ranger arrived on the scene and made him administer first aid. The miner subsequently decided to keep Tonto around, intending to make him the fall guy when he would later murder his partner. The Lone Ranger foiled both the attempted murder and the framing. No reason was given in the episode as to why Tonto chose to travel with the Lone Ranger, rather than continue about his business.

A different version was given in later episodes of the radio drama and at the beginning of The Lone Ranger television series: Tonto rescues the sole surviving Texas Ranger of a party that was tricked into an ambush by the outlaw Butch Cavendish. Tonto recognizes the ranger as someone who had saved him when they were both boys. He refers to him by the title "ke-mo sah-bee", explaining that the phrase means "faithful friend" (radio series) or "trusty scout" (television series) in the language of his tribe. In the 2013 film, Tonto translates the word as meaning "wrong brother". Tonto buries the dead rangers, and the Lone Ranger instructs him to make a sixth empty grave to leave the impression that he, too, is dead.

The radio series identified Tonto as a chief's son in the Potawatomi nation. The Potawatomi originated in the Great Lakes region, but in the 19th century, most had been relocated to the midwestern states. The choice to make Tonto a Potawatomi seems to come from station owner George Trendle's youth in Mullett Lake, Michigan. Located in the northern part of the Midwest, Michigan is the traditional territory of the Potawatomi, and many local institutions use Potawatomi names. Trendle gained the name "Tonto" from the local Potawatomi, who told him it meant "wild one" in their language. Other sources indicate that Camp Kee Mo Sah Bee belonged to the father-in-law of the show's director, James Jewell. According to author David Rothel, who interviewed Jewell a few months before his death, Kee Mo Sah Bee and Tonto were the only two words that Jewell remembered from those days. Alternatively, Tonto's name may have been inspired by the name of Tonto Basin, Arizona. In the first novel in a series published by Grosset and Dunlap, Tonto is described as a "half-breed." Though credited to Fran Striker, this book was actually written by Gaylord du Bois. Later books in the series were actually written by Striker, and were in line with the continuity from the radio series.

In the 2013 theatrical feature film of The Lone Ranger, Tonto is depicted as a disgraced Comanche tribesman and the last of the wendigo hunters. It's revealed that Tonto is actually suffering severe mental illness and survivor's guilt for inadvertently causing the massacre of his tribe by the film's villains. To rationalize what he had done, he convinced himself that the cannibalistic Butch Cavendish was a wendigo, a non-existent monster used in Native American ghost stories to frighten children. The character wears black-and-white face paint and a deceased crow on his head. According to Johnny Depp, who played him, the inspiration for the costume was a painting entitled I Am Crow by Kirby Sattler.

In Italian, Portuguese, and Spanish, "tonto" translates as "dumb", "moron", or "fool". In the Italian version the original name is retained, but in the Spanish dubbed version, the character is called "Toro" (Spanish for "bull") or "Ponto".

== Tonto's horse ==
Tonto first rode a horse named "White Feller" (White Fella/Fellah). When the 1938 Republic movie serial The Lone Ranger was being filmed, it was thought that having two white horses would be confusing, so the producers made "White Feller" a pinto horse, presumably on the theory that, being partly white, a pinto could still be named "White Feller". The radio series, noting that the pinto in the film had gone over well with audiences, decided that Tonto's mount would henceforth be a pinto. For several episodes, Tonto's new horse went unnamed, referred to only as "the paint horse" or simply "Paint". Eventually the name "Scout" was adopted.

== Comics ==
Tonto starred in his own comic book, The Lone Ranger's Companion Tonto, 31 issues of which were published by Dell Comics during the 1950s.

Later depictions beginning in the 1980s have taken efforts to show Tonto as an articulate and proud warrior whom the Ranger treats as an equal partner. In the Topps Comics four-issue miniseries, The Lone Ranger and Tonto, Tonto is even shown to be a very witty, outspoken, and sarcastic character willing to punch the Lone Ranger during a heated argument and commenting on his past pop-culture depictions with the words, "Of course, Kemosabe. Maybe when we talk I should use that 'me Tonto' stuff, way they write about me in the dime novels. You'd like that, wouldn't you?"

== Television ==
In the Timeless episode "Murder of Jesse James", Wyatt Logan, one of the main characters, mentions that Native American deputy U.S. marshal Grant Johnson was the inspiration for Tonto.

Jon Lovitz played a comic version of Tonto, in a group of other characters who speak little or broken English, on Saturday Night Live.

== Reception ==
The portrayal of Tonto has been seen by some Native Americans and others as degrading, notably by Native American author and poet Sherman Alexie.

Tonto was originally depicted as not fluent in English and spoke in a pidgin, saying things like, "That right, Kemo Sabe", or "Him say man ride over ridge on horse".

In 1975, poet and science fiction writer Paul O. Williams coined the term "tontoism" to refer to the practice of writing haiku with missing articles ("the", "a", or "an"), which he claimed made such haiku sound like Tonto's stunted English.

Michael Horse who played Tonto in the 1981 Lone Ranger film had mixed feelings about the role, and worried it was perpetuating stereotypes.

Later adaptations of the character, such as The Legend of the Lone Ranger and the Filmation animated series, depict him as being articulate in English and speaking it carefully.

Silverheels was not above making a little fun of the character, as in a classic sketch on The Tonight Show Starring Johnny Carson with Carson playing a career counselor and Silverheels playing Tonto looking for a new job after working "thirty lousy years" as the Lone Ranger's faithful sidekick. When asked why he was looking for a new job, Tonto replies, "Him finally find out what Kemo Sabe means!"
