= John Todd (actor) =

American actor (1876–1957)

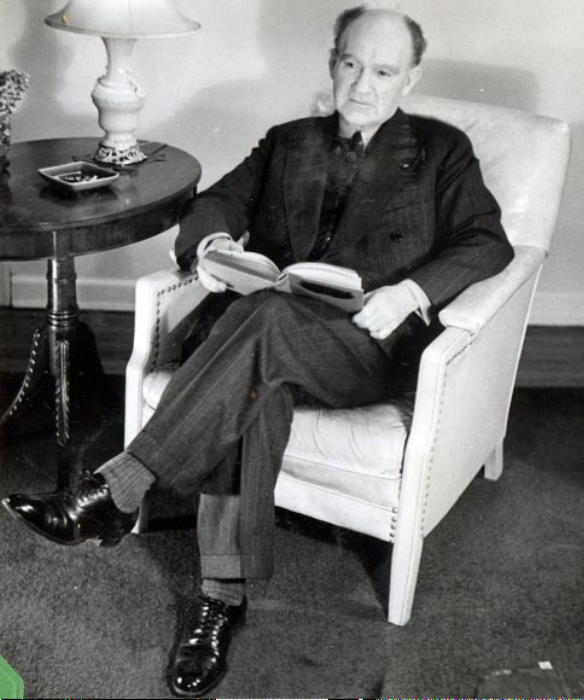
- Born: Fred McCarthy; August 14, 1876; Erie County, Pennsylvania, U.S.
- Died: July 14, 1957 (aged 80); Detroit, Michigan, U.S.
- Occupation: Actor

John Frederick "Fred" McCarthy (August 14, 1876 – July 14, 1957), known professionally as John Todd, was an American actor.

== Stage ==
Born in Erie, Pennsylvania, Todd acted in stock theater in Minneapolis. He performed with the Bainbridge Players for five years in the 1920s before making a transition from acting to directing. On Broadway, Todd appeared in The Flower of the Ranch (1908), Experience (1918), Lusmore (1919), Macushia (1920), The Mask of Hamlet (1921), and Money in the Air (1932).

== Radio ==
Known for Shakespearean roles, Todd soon gained work at Detroit radio station WXYZ, as part of director James Jewell's repertory company, with roles on the various series produced by the station.

His most famous work was on The Lone Ranger. He played a local sheriff in some of the show's earliest episodes, but on the twelfth broadcast, which aired February 25, 1933, Todd first played his most famous role, the masked man's Native American companion Tonto.

Todd was a bald and stocky man of Irish descent, though he occasionally donned a wig for publicity photos. He was usually replaced by a Native American performer for public appearances. With the exception of a brief period where he was replaced by a real Native American, Todd played Tonto for almost the entire radio run, and was the only original cast member heard on the final broadcast, on September 3, 1954.

Station owner George Trendle wanted to replace Todd in the role of Tonto because he was "too old". Todd's replacement, a college educated Native American, refused to perform the "me do" and "him go" type lines as written and Todd was given back the role of Tonto. Trendle had a reputation for keeping his performers working for low pay even when the show was a big money maker. This episode may have been another of Trendle's maneuvers to demonstrate that the actors could be replaced.

Other radio roles for Todd included recurring but less significant parts on The Green Hornet as Dan Reid, the title character's father and the now elderly version of the Lone Ranger's nephew, and on Challenge of the Yukon, as Inspector Conrad, Sgt. Preston's superior in the North-West Mounted Police.

== Death ==
On July 14, 1957, Todd died in Ford Hospital in Detroit.
