= The Chase and Sanborn Hour =

Series of American radio shows

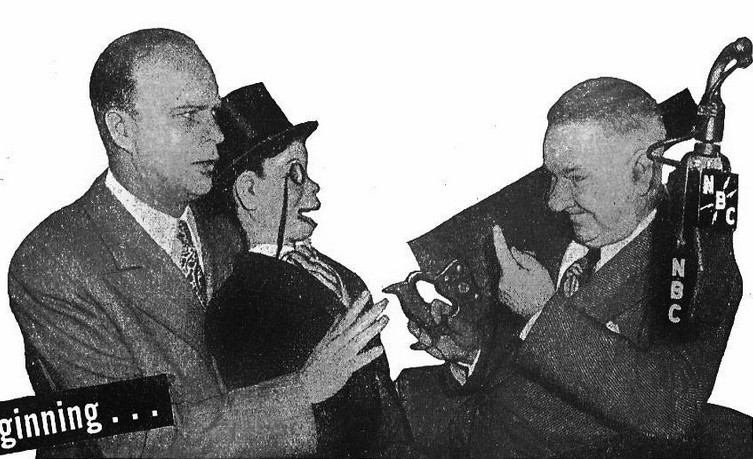
- Edgar Bergen and his dummy, Charlie McCarthy with W.C. Fields on The Chase and Sanborn Hour in 1945
- Genre: Comedy and variety show
- Running time: 30 minutes (1929-1931); 60 minutes (1931-1940); 30 minutes (1940-1948)
- Country of origin: United States
- Language: English
- Syndicates: NBC Radio Network
- Starring: Maurice Chevalier; Eddie Cantor; David Rubinoff; Jimmy Durante; Deems Taylor; Edgar Bergen; W.C. Fields; Walter Winchell; Don Ameche; Dorothy Lamour; Nelson Eddy; Mae West; Judy Canova; Jim Ameche; Marsha Hunt
- Announcer: Jimmy Wallington
- Original release: 1929 – December 26, 1948

The Chase and Sanborn Hour is the umbrella title for a series of American comedy and variety radio shows sponsored by Standard Brands' Chase and Sanborn Coffee, usually airing Sundays on NBC from 8 p.m. to 9 p.m. during the years 1929 to 1948.

== The Chase and Sanborn Choral Orchestra ==
The series began in 1929 as The Chase and Sanborn Choral Orchestra, a half-hour musical variety show heard Sundays at 8:30 p.m. on NBC. When Maurice Chevalier became the show's star, he received a record-breaking salary of $5,000 a week. Violinist David Rubinoff (1897–1986) became a regular in January 1931, introduced as "Rubinoff and His Violin."

== Eddie Cantor ==
Eddie Cantor was chosen as Chevalier's replacement and the new 60-minute program, The Chase and Sanborn Hour, was launched on September 13, 1931, teaming Cantor with Rubinoff and announcer Jimmy Wallington. The show established Cantor as a leading comedian, and his scriptwriter David Freedman as “the Captain of Comedy.” When Jimmy Durante stepped in as a substitute for Cantor, making his first appearance on September 10, 1933, he was so successful that he was offered his own show. Cantor continued as The Chase and Sanborn Hour's headliner until November 25, 1934. This version of the program was sometimes referred to as The Eddie Cantor Show. Durante was one of many entertainers who substituted for Cantor, who was often absent while making films or on tour. George Jessel, Bert Lahr, Georgie Price, and Harry Richman were others who took Cantor's place on the show.

== The Opera Guild and other replacements ==
With a new format, The Opera Guild, hosted by Deems Taylor, began December 2, 1934, Sundays at 8 p.m., on The Chase and Sanborn Hour, and that concert series continued until March 17, 1935. Wilfrid Pelletier was the director. Major Bowes' Original Amateur Hour had the slot from March 24, 1935, until September 11, 1936, followed by Do You Want to Be an Actor?, with Haven MacQuarrie, broadcast from January 3, 1937, until May 2, 1937, a series that continued Sundays at 10:30 p.m. as a half-hour show from December 5, 1937, until February 20, 1938.

== Edgar Bergen ==
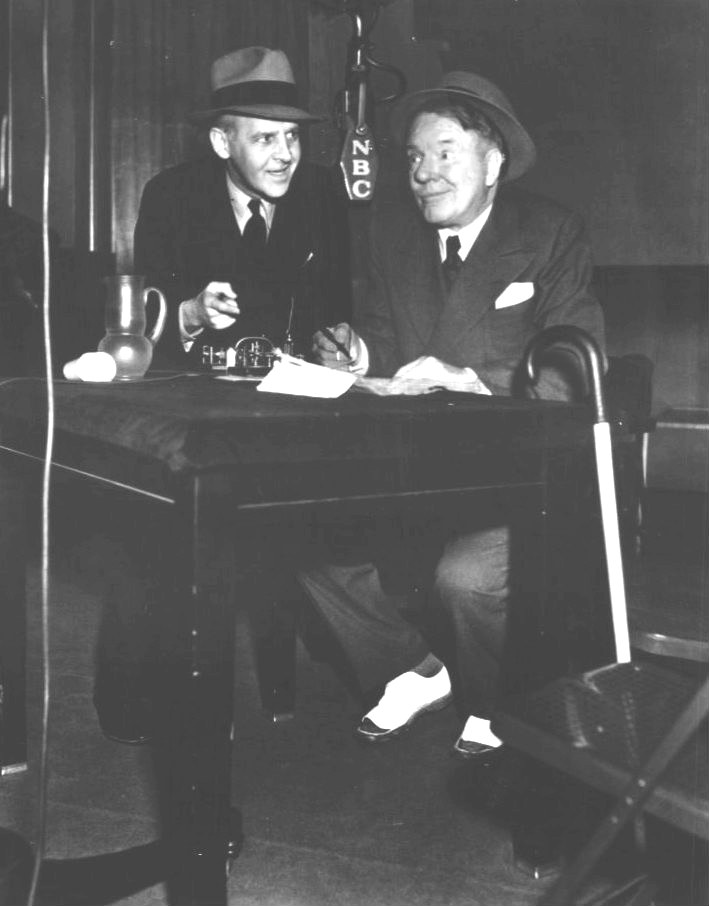
The new cast member, W.C. Fields, with Walter Winchell in 1937

Meanwhile, Chase and Sanborn found a gold mine with a wooden dummy when Edgar Bergen and Charlie McCarthy began an 11-year run, starting May 9, 1937. Initially this incarnation of the program also featured as regulars master of ceremonies Don Ameche, singers Dorothy Lamour and Nelson Eddy, and for the first 16 weeks, comedian W.C. Fields, accompanied by a different guest star each week. On October 2, 1938, Judy Canova and her siblings, Annie and Zeke, became regulars on the program.

Beginning on January 7, 1940, the regular cast, apart from Bergen and McCarthy, were dropped and the show was cut to a half-hour and retitled The Chase and Sanborn Program. Ameche was replaced by his younger brother Jim Ameche. Also beginning in 1940, the program went on hiatus for a number of weeks each summer. NBC (and the sponsor) filled its airtime with a different summer replacement show each year, including The Bishop and the Gargoyle (1940), What's My Name? (1941), Star-Spangled Vaudeville (1942), Paul Whiteman Presents (1943), The Gracie Fields Show (1944), The Frances Langford Show [aka The Chase and Sanborn Program] (1945), and Alec Templeton Time (1946–47). In the fall of 1948, Chase and Sanborn announced it would terminate its contract with Edgar Bergen at the end of the year. The remaining Bergen/McCarthy programs eschewed guest stars in favor of regular sketches featuring Don Ameche and Marsha Hunt as The Bickersons. In 1949, Bergen moved to CBS, with a new weekly program (The Charlie McCarthy Show) sponsored by Coca-Cola.

Although the series ended December 26, 1948, it was followed by a compilation show on NBC, The Chase and Sanborn 100th Anniversary Show (November 15, 1964), assembled by writer Carroll Carroll and narrated by Bergen. This became an annual event with The Chase and Sanborn 101st Anniversary Show (November 14, 1965), a Fred Allen tribute, followed by The Chase and Sanborn 102nd Anniversary Show (November 13, 1966), which turned out to be the last of the series.
