= Jack Armstrong, the All-American Boy =

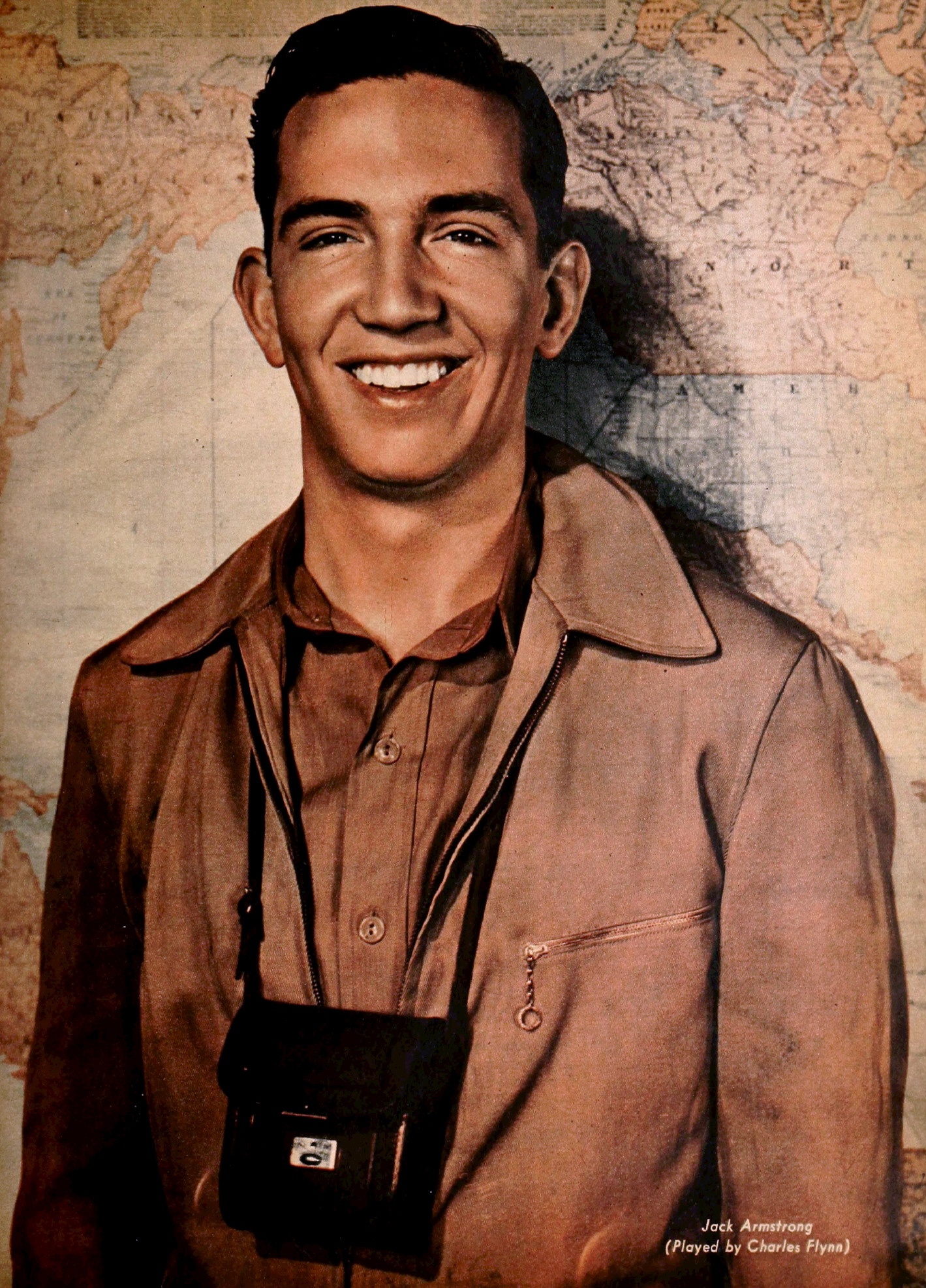
- Charles Flynn as Jack Armstrong, 1943
- Genre: Juvenile adventure serial
- Running time: 15 minutes
- Country of origin: United States
- Language: English
- Syndicates: CBS; NBC; Mutual; Blue Network; ABC
- Starring: Jim Ameche; Stanley Harris; Charles Flynn; Rye Billsbury; John Gannon as Billy
- Announcer: Ken Nordine; Ed Prentiss
- Written by: James Jewell; Alan Fishburn; Donald Gallagher; Kermit Slobb; Paul Fairman; Jack Lawrence; Thomas Elvidge; Talbot Mundy
- Directed by: James Jewell
- Produced by: James Jewell
- Original release: July 31, 1933 – June 1, 1950 (Armstrong of the SBI: September 5, 1950-June 28, 1951).

Jack Armstrong, the All-American Boy was a radio adventure series which maintained its popularity from 1933 to 1951. The program originated at WBBM in Chicago on July 31, 1933, and was later carried on CBS, then NBC and finally ABC.

== Background ==
Jack Armstrong, the All-American Boy was a creation of General Mills, a pioneer in the development of unique and compelling advertising under the stewardship of Vice-president of Advertising, Samuel Chester Gale. Gale later served as President of the Ad Council. Intending to promote breakfast cereal Wheaties, Gale developed the character of Jack Armstrong as a fictitious "everyboy" whom listeners would emulate: If Jack ate Wheaties, boys across the nation would, too. Early popularity led to commissioning of a radio serial broadcast.

The first sung commercial was for Wheaties in 1926. It was a spectacular hit and was sung on the Jack Armstrong show. The lyrics were:

Have you tried Wheaties?
They’re whole wheat with all of the bran
Won’t you try Wheaties?
For wheat is the best food of man
They're crispy and crunchy the whole year through
Jack Armstrong never tires of them
And neither will you
So just buy Wheaties
The best breakfast food in the land!

While the adventures were a product of Gale's imagination, there was a real Jack Armstrong, a member of Sam Gale's college fraternity, Phi Sigma Kappa at the University of Minnesota. Gale met Jack while serving as a young advisor to the fraternity, and being impressed by both the red-blooded name and the "wholesome nature" of the young man, he incorporated it as the name of his new invented spokesman. The adventures which captivated listeners each week were entirely fictitious, and led to good-natured ribbing throughout Armstrong's life.

The radio serial maintained its popularity from 1933 to 1951. The storylines centered on the globe-trotting adventures of Armstrong (played by Jim Ameche until 1938 and later portrayed by Michael Rye), a popular athlete at Hudson High School, his friends Billy Fairfield and Billy's sister Betty, and their Uncle Jim, James Fairfield, an industrialist. Frequently, Uncle Jim Fairfield would have to visit an exotic part of the world in connection with his business, and he would take Jack Armstrong and the Fairfield siblings along with him. Many of the adventures provided listeners with the equivalent of a travelogue, providing facts about the lands they were visiting. The show was created by writer Robert Hardy Andrews. Sponsored throughout its long run by Wheaties, the program was renamed Armstrong of the SBI when Jack graduated from high school and became a government agent in the final season, when it shifted from a 15-minute serial to a half-hour complete story format. Throughout its broadcast span, the program offered radio premiums that usually related to the adventures in which Jack and his friends were involved.

Each episode started with a quartet quietly singing the first line of the Hudson High School Fight Song: "Wave the flag for Hudson High, boys, show them how we stand. Ever shall our team be champions, known throughout the land" (quartet continues humming)

== Adaptations ==
=== Films ===
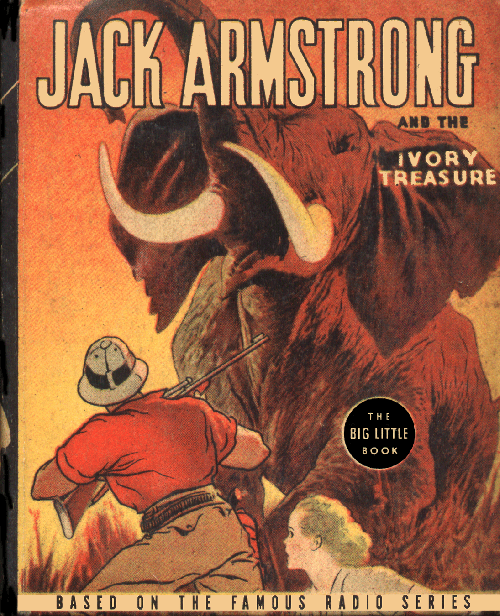
Henry E. Vallely did the cover art for this 1937 Big Little Book.

In the Jack Armstrong movie serial of 1947, ace science whiz Armstrong (John Hart) must free his friend from an island fortress after he is kidnapped by a villain who wants his help in building a death ray.

=== Books ===
In 1936, publishers Cupples & Leon released the two volume Jack Armstrong series by Stanley J. Wallace, consisting of Jack Armstrong's Mystery Eye and Jack Armstrong's Mystery Crystal.

=== Comics ===
That same year the Parents Institute began publishing its Jack Armstrong comic book which had a 13-issue run. Leslie N. Daniels, Jr. wrote the Big Little Book, Jack Armstrong and the Ivory Treasure (1937). Daniels' tale was based on a 1937 Talbot Mundy radio script which Mundy had first written as his novel The Ivory Trail (1919). In 1939, Whitman released a second Big Little Book, Jack Armstrong and the Mystery of the Iron Key.

Bob Schoenke also drew a newspaper comic strip based on the radio series, which ran from May 26, 1947 to June 11, 1950. After three years of Jack Armstrong, Schoenke replaced it with a new strip, Laredo Crockett, which ran until 1964.

Parents' Magazine Press also produced the comic Jack Armstrong Magazine, which began in November 1947 and ran for 13 issues, until September 1949.

=== TV series ===
A short Jack Armstrong animated TV pilot was developed by Hanna-Barbera for a proposed television series. However, when negotiations for rights to the characters collapsed, the planned series was reworked into what became the animated adventure Jonny Quest (1964). The Jack Armstrong footage of African natives hurling spears at two people escaping by hovercraft to an airplane survived in the closing credits for Jonny Quest.

=== Video games ===
Timothy Bottoms portrayed Jack Armstrong in the video game, American Hero (1995).

== Honors ==
Jack Armstrong entered the National Radio Hall of Fame in 1989.
