= John H. Kunsky =

American businessman (1875–1952)

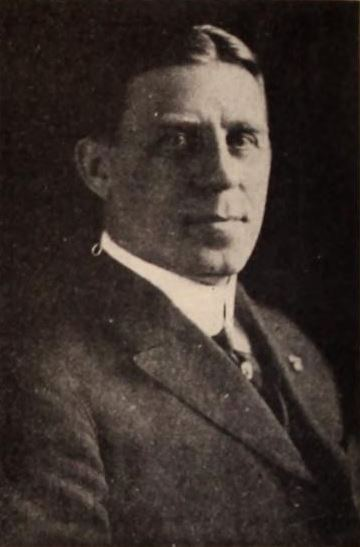
From a 1921 magazine

John H. Kunsky (1875–1952) was a Detroit area businessman who made his fortune by investing in movie theaters. He later became partners with George W. Trendle and invested in radio.

== Movie theaters ==
Kunsky had been an early investor in Nickelodeons beginning in 1905. During the first decade of the 20th century, small vaudeville style theaters were used for stage and film. The Bijou was one of several small nickelodeon theater owned by Kunsky. Kunsky made a lot of money operating these small theaters, but decided it was time for something bigger.

John Kunsky hired architect C. Howard Crane to design the first true movie house in Detroit. The Columbia opened in 1911 and could seat over 1000. It contained a pipe organ and had facilities for its own orchestra. This was only the second large movie house in the United States.

The Strand with nearly 1400 seats and the Alhambra, with about 1475 seats were designed by C. Howard Crane, and both opened in 1915. The Adams Theater was built in 1917.

John Kunsky dreamed of building larger and grander movie palaces. Kunsky once again hired C. Howard Crane to design his first such theater. The 1806 seat Madison was completed in 1917, costing $500,000 to build.

It was not certain if movies would be a passing fad of if such large theaters could be profitable. To insure the project would make money, a five-story office building was built around the theater. This was the start of a Detroit tradition of building movie theaters as part of an office block development. The Madison was a success and Kunsky and Crane built ever larger and more lavish theaters.

The Capitol Theater opened in 1922. Although Kunsky boasted it had 4,250 seats, it actually had more like 3,384 seats (it became the Detroit Opera House in 1996 and seating was reduced to 2,765).

The 4050-seat Michigan Theater was built by the architectural firm of Rapp & Rapp and opened in August 1926

The Birmingham Theatre and the Royal Oak Theatre opened in 1927.

The 2,051-seat Redford Theatre, which still features its original Barton organ, opened in January 1928.

The Fisher Theatre Designed by the firm of Graven & Mayger was the last of Kunsky's theaters, opening in 1928. It could seat 2,975 in its plush auditorium seats. The interior featured two balconies, an orchestra pit, a 4-manual/36-rank Wurlitzer organ. In the lobby, there was a goldfish pond, real banana trees, and macaws which patrons could feed by hand.

By 1928, Kunsky owned twenty movie theaters, including four of the largest first-run theaters in Detroit. Kunsky Theatres included:

- Adams Theater 1770 seats - opened 1917
- Alhambra Theater 1475 seats - opened 1915
- Bijou Theatre 314 seats - opened 1906
- Birmingham Theatre 1250 seats - opened 1927
- Capitol Theater 3384 seats - opened in 1922
- Columbia Theatre 1006 seats - opened 1911
- Fisher Theatre 2975 seats - opened 1928 (remodeled in 1961 to 2,089 seats)
- Madison Theatre 1806 seat - opened 1917
- Michigan Theater 4038 seat - opened 1926
- Oriental Theater 2950 seats - opened 1927
- Redford Theatre 2,051 seat - opened 1928
- Royal Oak 1700 seats - opened in 1927
- State Theater 2,967 seats - opened 1925
- Strand Theatre nearly 1400 seats - opened 1915

Kunsky was driven out of the theater business when Adolph Zukor acquired the Detroit area film exchange known as the Cooperative Booking Office and began pressuring local theater owners to sell out to Paramount. Trendle negotiated to sell Kunsky's theatres for six million dollars. Zukor transferred the theaters to a Paramount subsidiary named United Detroit Theatres. In 1948, Paramount's monopoly became the focus of an antitrust suit initiated by the Society of Independent Motion Pictures (SIMPP).

As part of the deal, Trendle and Kunsky were required never to re-enter the movie business in Detroit.

== Radio ==
Trendle and Kunsky formed the Kunsky-Trendle Broadcasting Company in 1929, after purchasing Detroit radio station WGHP. The radio station's call letters were changed to WXYZ.

Trendle was the President and Kunsky was the vice president of the company. Trendle was active as the station manager. Kunsky is rarely mentioned, except as co-owner.

WXYZ was initially affiliated with the Columbia Broadcasting System (CBS) but became an independent station within a year.

In 1931, Kunsky-Trendle acquired WASH and WOOD in Grand Rapids, Michigan. The two stations merged facilities, including studios and transmitters but retained both station licenses. WASH was on the air from 8am to Noon, and WOOD from Noon to Midnight. WOOD-WASH became an NBC Red affiliate in 1935. King and Trendle decided to drop the WASH license in 1942, keeping the WOOD identification.

Kunsky legally changed his name to King in 1936 and the 'Kunsky-Trendle Broadcasting Company' became the 'King-Trendle Broadcasting Company'.

In 1946, the newly formed American Broadcasting Company purchased the King-Trendle Broadcasting Company and its radio stations for $3.65 million. This sale was for the broadcast facilities (including WOOD, WXYZ and the Michigan Regional Network), but did not include ownership of Trendle's radio programs. The Federal Communications Commission (FCC) approved ABC's purchase on July 18, 1946. In 1952, Paramount Theaters, owner of Kunsky's former theaters, purchased ABC, including WXYZ.

== Other ==
John Kunsky earned his wealth by building movie theaters and wished for a mansion that would incorporate many of the symbols of theater. He hired noted theater architect C. Howard Crane to design his Tudor mansion.

About 1936-37, John Kunsky (now John King) decided to build a resort in Land o' Lakes, Wisconsin in the region on the border between the Upper Peninsula of Michigan and Wisconsin. The King's Gateway Hotel complex included a restaurant, bowling and gambling facilities, a log beam hotel, a golf course, swimming beaches, stables, an airport, ice skating and a ski chalet with a 93-foot ski jump.

On June 24, 1947, King, then a widower, married Sarah (Sug) DeMers, a local girl he had met while visiting his resort.

John King died January 2, 1952, and his widow continued to operate the resort complex until Feb. 17, 1961. The property was then sold to Walter Williamson.
