= OG Keemo =

German rapper

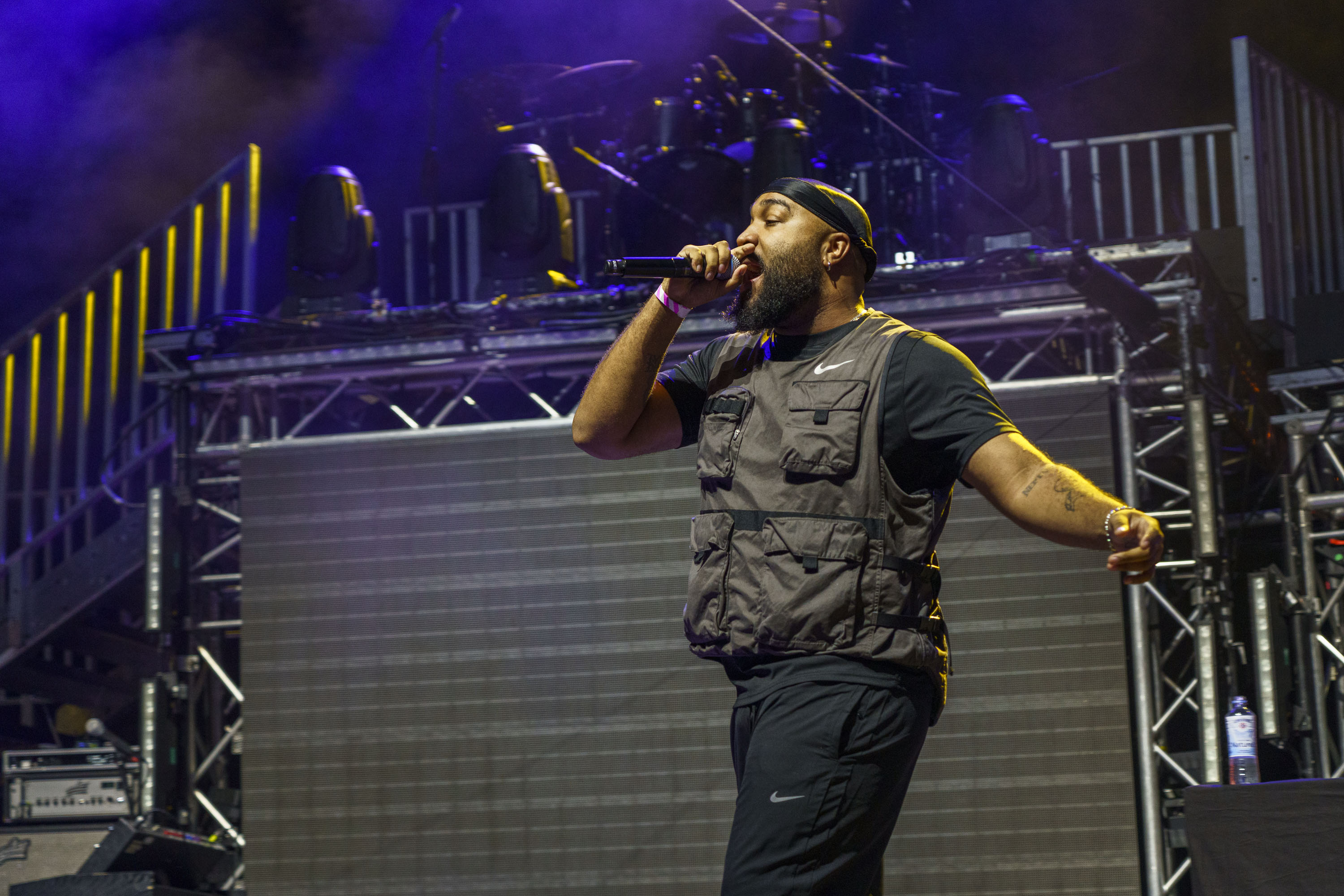
- OG Keemo in Munich in 2020

Background information
- Born: Karim Joel Martin; 1993 (age 32–33); Mainz, Germany
- Occupation: Rapper
- Label: Chimperator Productions

Karim Joel Martin (born 1993), known professionally as OG Keemo, is a German rapper.

== Life ==
Karim Joel Martin was born in Mainz, Germany, in 1993, to a Sudanese father. After his parents separated, he moved to Bayreuth. He lived in several cities before settling permanently in Mannheim.

He first began publishing rap music channel on SoundCloud. After his SoundCloud channel became increasingly popular he was signed by the Stuttgart-based label Chimperator Productions in September 2017. In October 2017, he released the extended play Neptun. In November 2019, his first studio-length album, Geist, was released. He released a second album, Mann beißt Hund, in January 2022. Hiphop.de named the album the best German rap album of 2022.

== Discography ==
=== Albums ===
Year	Title	Chart		
Year	Title	GER	AUT	SWI
2019	Geist	14	–	83
2022	Mann beißt Hund	2	13	12
2024	Fieber	1	5	4
2026	Berserker +	25	21	20

=== Mixtapes ===
Year	Title	Chart		
Year	Title	GER	AUT	SWI
2017	Neptun	3	–	–
2018	Skalp	–	–	–
2019	Otello	–	–	–
2022	Was wäre wenn	–	–	–
2024	Fieber	1	5	4

=== Singles ===
Year	Title	Chart		
Year	Title	GER	AUT	SWI
2017	"Kobe"	–	–	–
2017	"Distanz"	–	–	–
2018	"25/8"	–	–	–
2018	"Audio Archiv"	–	–	–
2018	"Neptun"	–	–	–
2018	"Trap"	–	–	–
2019	"216"	–	–	–
2019	"Gargoyle"	–	–	–
2019	"Geist"	–	–	–
2019	"Zinnmann"	–	–	–
2020	"Malik"	–	–	–
2021	"Glakky Freestyle"	–	–	–
2021	"Blanko" (feat. Kwam E)	–	–	–
2021	"Regen"	–	–	–
2022	"Civic"	–	–	–
2022	"Mach kaputt" (Schmyt feat. OG Keemo)	–	–	–
2023	"Fieber"	–	–	–
2023	"Pimpsport" (feat. Shindy)	58	–	–
2023	"Bee Gees" (feat. Levin Liam)	–	–	–
