= Michigan Building =

Famed high-rise in Detroit, Michigan, USA

- Michigan Theatre Building
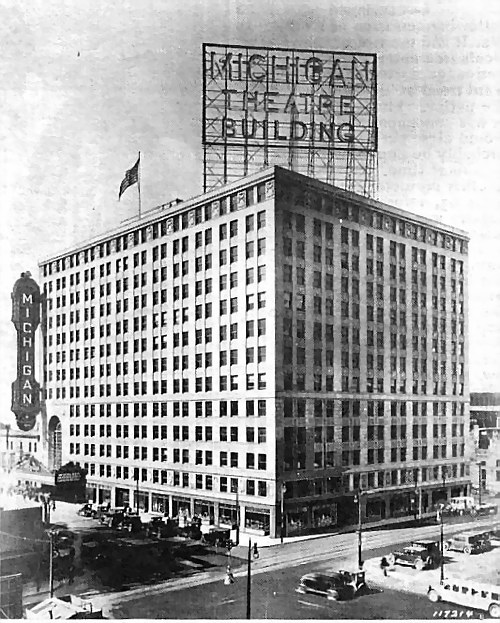
- Exterior photo taken in 1926
- Interactive map of Michigan Building
- Address: 220 Bagley Avenue; Detroit, Michigan; United States
- Coordinates: 42.3347°N 83.0534°W
- Owner: John H. Kunsky
- Capacity: 4,050
- Current use: Office Space, Coworking Space, Retail Space, Restaurant, Bar, Parking garage, Parking lot

Construction
- Opened: 1926
- Closed: 1976
- Architect: Rapp & Rapp

Website
- MichiganTheaterDetroit.com

The Michigan Building is an office building and the former Michigan Theater in downtown Detroit, Michigan. It was constructed in 1925 and stands at 13 floors in height. The building contains a bar, restaurant, retail space, office space, a parking garage, and the shared coworking space Cowork at The Michigan.

The current owner, Bagley Acquisitions Corp., offered the structure for auction in 2014 with a minimum requested bid of $1 million, but received no offers.

The high-rise was constructed in the Renaissance Revival. The exterior of the building is faced with brick with terra cotta and granite accents. The ground level contains retail space with large windows still framed by the original decorative metal work.

== History ==
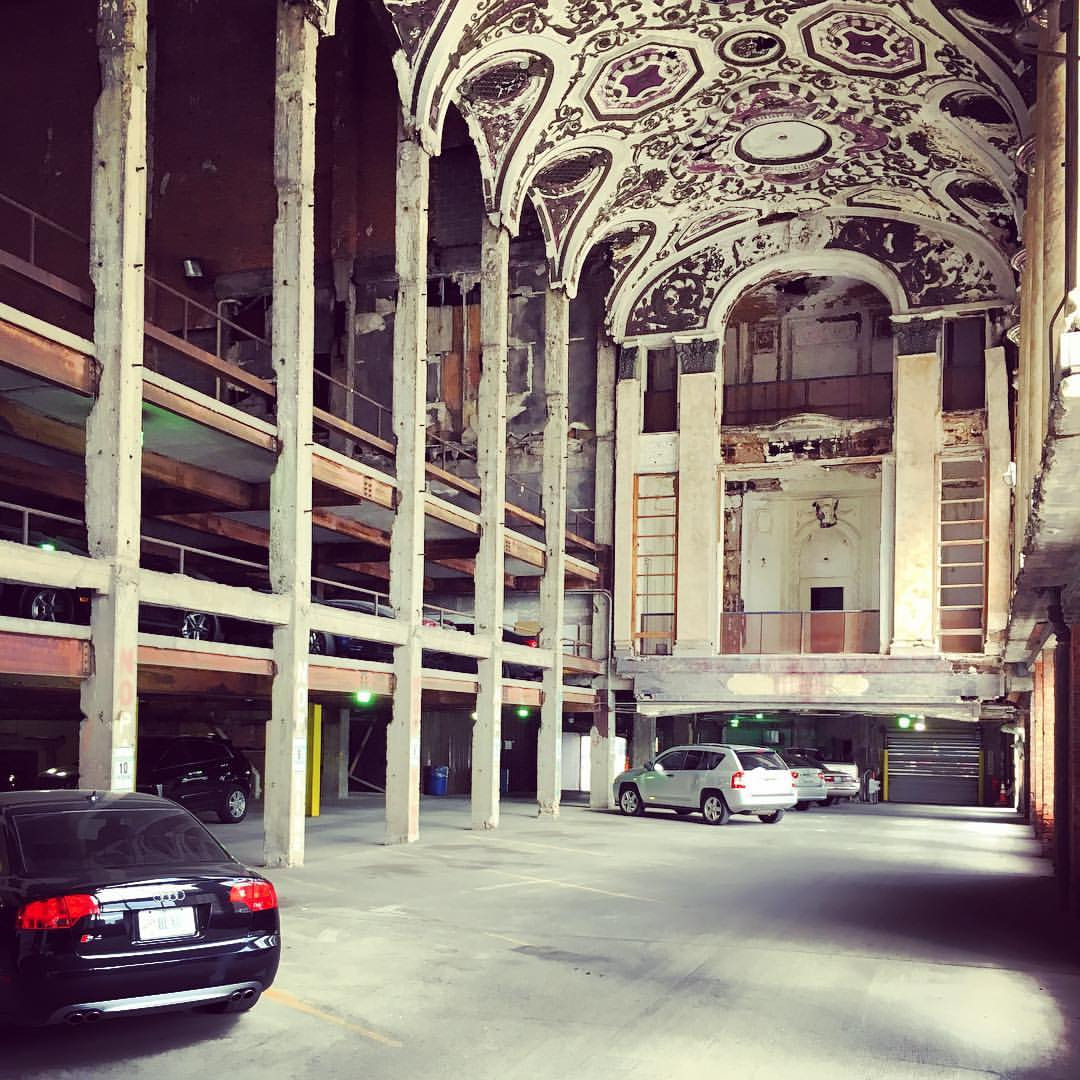
Part of the interior, 2017

It opened August 23, 1926, and was designed by the architectural firm of Rapp & Rapp for Detroit philanthropist and movie theater owner John H. Kunsky. The theater's construction cost $5 million (equivalent to $62 million in 2008). With a seating capacity of 4050, the concert hall/movie house was one of the largest in Michigan. Throughout the 1950s and 1960s, the theater changed ownership several times. It was subsequently used for various events: in the 1960s, a closed-circuit television provided views of Red Wings ice hockey games for those who could not attend the actual event in nearby Olympia arena, and in the 1970s, the theater was a nightclub and concert venue for rock bands.

Upon its completion, the Michigan Theater could seat 4,050 patrons, although theatre developer John Kunsky boasted 4,500 seats. In addition to films in its prime years, the theatre hosted performances of bands led by John Philip Sousa, Benny Goodman, Jimmy Dorsey and Harry James as well as live performances by The Marx Brothers, Betty Grable and Bob Hope. During its later rock band era, it hosted David Bowie during his 1974 tour as well as some bands on their way up, such as KISS in 1974 and 1975 before the band outgrew the venue and moved to larger venues, such as Cobo Arena.

The theater ceased operations in 1976 after operating as a nightclub named The Michigan Palace. After the closure, office tenants threatened to leave unless they received adequate parking. To retain the tenants, building owners gutted and converted the theater into a parking structure. The theater could not be completely demolished and replaced by a parking structure because it is integral to the structure of the office building. The ornate plaster ceiling of the theater auditorium and grand lobby, at the ninth floor level, are still intact, as are parts of the mezzanine, the 2nd and 3rd balcony foyers and their staircases. The projection booth is also still intact. The Michigan Theater was built on the site of the small garage where Henry Ford built his first automobile (the garage was transported brick-by-brick to The Henry Ford Museum in nearby Dearborn). The ninth floor was used for filming the donut contest in the series three premiere episode of The Grand Tour, entitled "Motown Funk".

The great arched window over the entrance is a false as the grand lobby is approximately 40 feet (12 m) behind the window. This false window (largest of its kind in the country) has a curved back wall with over 50 ornate mirrors that reflected the light from chandelier out to the street. Although the tall narrow chandelier is gone, new lighting has been installed within the 5 story tall window chamber.

The Michigan is featured in several films: in 8 Mile, where the crew rapped before entering the Chin Tiki restaurant space; in The Island, where it is a structure of the Los Angeles of the future; in Street Kings: Motor City; in Alex Cross; and in Transformers: Age of Extinction. Multiple episodes of the television show Detroit 1-8-7 have also filmed scenes in the space. During a scene in Only Lovers Left Alive set in the building, the main protagonists discuss its history as an example of cultural change and decay.
