= James Jewell (director) =

American director and actor (1906–1975)

James E. Jewell
- Born: February 20, 1906; Detroit, Michigan, U.S.
- Died: August 5, 1975 (aged 69); Chicago, Illinois, U.S.
- Occupations: Radio actor, producer, director
- Years active: 1927–1955
- Known for: The Lone Ranger, The Green Hornet, The Silver Eagle
- Spouse: Mary Martha Yeager (1933–1975; his death)

James Jewell (February 20, 1906 – August 5, 1975) was an American radio actor, producer and director at radio station WXYZ, Detroit, Michigan.

== Early life ==
Jewell was born in Detroit, Michigan, on February 20, 1906. His parents were William I. Jewell (born 1873), who immigrated to the US from Canada in 1875, and Clara (born 1881 in Michigan). His grandfather had come to Canada from Ireland with a group of Welsh singers. His mother operated a grocery store in the Corktown section of Detroit.

== Professional career ==
Jewell first entered radio in 1927, bringing with him a background in summer stock, vaudeville, burlesque, and even touring with a troupe of marionettes. His first professional engagement was at the Jessie Bonstelle Stock Theater in Detroit, where he worked as a stagehand. He worked his way up to assistant treasurer while also playing bit parts, and by the age of 21, he was acting in the Paramount Studios in Queens.

=== WXYZ ===
James Jewell was brought to the staff of WXYZ in 1930 by his brother Ralph Jewell who played cornet in the studio orchestra. Initially he worked as an on air announcer. George Trendle, the station's owner, did not care for Jewell's announcing, but because of his theater background, Trendle elevated him to the role dramatic director for the station, originating and directing new dramas. Jewell brought along his stock company, "The Jewell Players" to cast his dramas.

Jewell was part of the station staff that worked out the original concepts for The Lone Ranger. Jewell is also credited for selecting The William Tell Overture as the theme music for the series. "Ke-mo sah-bee", Tonto's greeting to the masked Ranger, was derived from the name of a boys' camp owned by Jewell's father-in-law Charles W. Yeager. Camp Kee-Mo-Sah-Bee operated from 1911 until 1941 on Mullet Lake south of Mackinac, Michigan. After the radio show became popular, Yeager held "Lone Ranger Camps" at his camp.

Jewell produced, directed and occasionally wrote many of the early episodes for the popular series The Manhunter as well as The Lone Ranger and The Green Hornet. He was the director for the latter series from their beginning up until 1938. He even played the Ranger in one episode. Jewell's sister, Lenore Allman (Lenore Jewell Allman) wanted to play a role in a radio series at WXYZ so Jim wrote her into The Green Hornet. She played Lenore Case, the Green Hornet's secretary, for 28 years and is in the Radio Hall of Fame.

=== WBBM ===
Jewell left WXYZ in 1938, and moved to Chicago and worked as a director-producer at WBBM (AM), the CBS radio affiliate in Chicago.

He directed Jack Armstrong, the All-American Boy beginning in 1938 until the series ended in 1951. From 1951 to 1955, Jewell was the producer/director of The Silver Eagle, a mountie adventure which ran on ABC and starred Jim Ameche, the brother of movie star Don Ameche.

As the era of radio dramatic series came to an end, attempted to bring The Silver Eagle to television.

== Personal life ==
Jewell married Mary Martha Yeager in 1933. They had two children James Patrick and Judith. He was 6 feet tall, 200 lbs, black hair and a clipped mustache, In his later years he built marionettes as a hobby in a workshop in the basement of his home in Evanston, Illinois.

He died from a heart attack in Chicago in August 1975.
