= 4 Digital Group =

Former media company

- Type: consortium
- Industry: Radio
- Founded: 2007
- Headquarters: London, United Kingdom
- Area served: United Kingdom
- Key people: Nathalie Schwarz, Chair; Andy Barnes – Director of Sales, Channel 4; Simon Cole – Chief executive, UBC Media; Charlie Cox – Company Director, The Carphone Warehouse; Dee Ford – Group managing director, Emap Radio; Scott Taunton – managing director, UTV Radio
- Website: channel4.com/radio/4digital/

4 Digital Group was a media consortium in the United Kingdom. In July 2007, the group won the licence to operate the second national DAB radio multiplex. The consortium, led by Channel 4 Radio, was a combination of existing commercial radio operators and brands new to radio. The group aimed to boost the up-take of digital radio in the United Kingdom in a similar manner to the growth of digital television since the introduction of Freeview. Their strategy for this was the introduction of ten new national stations, including speech and music services, and advertising for the format.

== Demise ==
In October 2008 Channel Four Television Corporation announced that it was abandoning its plans for digital radio stations. Subsequently, the licence was returned to Ofcom. Therefore, all details below refer to purely what was planned, and was taken from promotional material of the time. None of it actually occurred.

== Planned stations ==
The planned stations were:

- E4 Radio was to be a contemporary music and entertainment service targeted at 15- to 29-year-olds and delivered in the style of the E4 television channel. The proposed content was popular music, entertainment and comedy. The channel would experiment with new talent, ideas and music.
- Channel 4 Radio was to be a proposed speech station, including debate, opinion, comedy and drama programming, with a considerable news and current affairs output. The target audience would be 30- to 54-year-olds.
- Pure4 was a proposed contemporary music station, which would feature speech content about their artists and bands. Programming would also include arts, film, books and exhibitions.
- Talk Radio was to be a speech station proposed by UTV which would mix news and features with talkback programming. Content would be set by the day's news.
- The plan for Bauer Radio's proposed station, Closer, was for a music station targeting women aged 30+ with a broad range of contemporary and classic popular hits and topical chat on issues such as health, diet, wellbeing, fashion and relationships, using a mix of both celebrity and listener real-life experiences.
- Sky News Radio was a proposed 24-hour news station. The proposal was a joint venture between Sky, which runs a television news channel, and Chrysalis Radio, which owned LBC 97.3 FM and LBC News 1152 AM in London. However LBC's new owners Global Radio pulled out of the deal.
- Based on the London station, Sunrise Radio UK was a proposed station featuring Asian culture, primarily music, including Bollywood, Bhangra and Asian folk music. Speech content would focus on news and features tailored to the two million British people with Asian backgrounds.
- Operated by CanWest MediaWorks, Original was a proposed contemporary and classic popular music station. The station hoped to employ well-known presenters and produce specialist evening music shows.
- Radio Disney aimed to be the first national UK radio station broadcasting children's programmes full-time. Aimed at 8 to 12-year-olds, the core of the service would be a variety of suitable and popular music.

=== Other services ===
As well as innovative new radio stations, 4 Digital Group planned to introduce a national Podcast Service, providing an opportunity for niche services catering for a diversity of passions, interests and communities to reach audiences throughout the UK.

Downloadable radio podcasts could include:

- Gaydar (gay and lesbian community)
- Club Asia (Asian dance music)
- NME (new music)
- IMG (sport)
- Penguin (audio books)
- The Financial Times (business)
- The Prince's Trust (youth new music and issues)
- Media Trust (social action)
- Colourful (multi-cultural speech)

=== Transmission ===
4 Digital Group planned to build and operate a transmission network capable of reaching nearly 88% of the adult population on the move (outdoor), nearly 80.5% in home (robust indoor), and 45% using handheld receivers. There would be coverage of 94% of the motorway network in England, Scotland and Wales.

=== Marketing ===
4 Digital Group planned to commit £4.5 million to general marketing of digital radio in the first three years of the licence period, together with more than £25 million to support the launch of the individual new radio stations.

=== Group companies ===
The group companies were:

==== Initial shareholders ====
- Channel 4 Radio (55%)
- Bauer Radio (10%)
- UTV Radio (GB) Limited (10%)
- BSkyB (10%)
- Carphone Warehouse Group plc (10%)
- UBC Media Group plc (5%)

==== Station providers ====
- Channel 4 Radio
- BSkyB
- Bauer Radio
- UTV Radio
- CanWest MediaWorks
- The Walt Disney Company
- Sunrise Radio

==== Podcast providers ====
- Club Asia
- Colourful
- The Financial Times
- Gaydar
- NME
- Penguin
- Media Trust
- The Princes Trust
- IMG

==== Strategic partners ====
- BBC
- Universal Music Group
- The Cloud
- iriver
- ITIS Holdings
- BT Movio

== See also ==
- Channel 4
- Digital radio in the United Kingdom
