= New Music Download =

Fortnightly podcast presented by Tom Ravenscroft

New Music Download was a fortnightly podcast presented by Tom Ravenscroft for Channel 4 Radio. It ran between January and June 2008, replacing the Slashmusic podcast that ran from August 2006 to June 2007. It was produced by Hermeet Chadhar.

Hermeet Chadhar formerly produced a Radio 1 show for Tom Ravenscroft's father John Peel. New Music Download is a relaunch of Ravenctoft father's show Slashmusic.

== Music ==
=== Sessions ===
The following sessions were recorded for the programme:

Show	Date	Artist
1	17 January 2008	Akron/Family
2	31 January 2008	Super Flu
3	14 February 2008	The Mae Shi
4	28 February 2008	Pre
5	13 March 2008	Current Value
6	27 March 2008	Drumcorps
7	10 April 2008	Peter and the Wolf
8	24 April 2008	Agaskodo Teliverik
9	8 May 2008	Jana Hunter
10	22 May 2008	Oxford Collapse
11	5 June 2008	Born Ruffians
12	19 June 2008	Sleeps in Oysters
