= Alien 5 =

Alien 5 may refer to:

- Prometheus (2012 film), the fifth installment in the Alien franchise
- Alien 5, an unproduced film by James Cameron
- Alien 5, an unproduced film by Joss Whedon

== See also ==
- Alien V, a fictional character in the Ben 10 (2016) animated series
