= Ray Bradbury Award =

Science fiction and fantasy media award

Ray Bradbury Nebula Award for Outstanding Dramatic Presentation
- Awarded for: The best science fiction or fantasy dramatic presentation published in the prior calendar year
- Presented by: Science Fiction and Fantasy Writers Association
- First award: 1992
- Most recent winner: Paul Weitz and Chris Weitz for Murderbot: Season One
- Website: nebulas.sfwa.org

The Ray Bradbury Nebula Award for Outstanding Dramatic Presentation (formerly the Ray Bradbury Award for Outstanding Dramatic Presentation) is given each year by the Science Fiction and Fantasy Writers Association (SFWA) for science fiction or fantasy dramatic works such as movies or television episodes. To be eligible for Nebula Award consideration a work must be published in English in the United States. Works published in English elsewhere in the world are also eligible provided they are released either on a website or in an electronic edition. Only individual works are eligible, not serials such as television series, though miniseries of three or fewer parts are allowed. The award, named to honor prolific author and screenwriter Ray Bradbury, was begun in 1992 as the Ray Bradbury Award for Outstanding Dramatic Presentation. It was not considered a Nebula Award, despite being awarded at the same ceremony, and was chosen by the President of SFWA instead of by a vote. This form of the award was given in 1992, 1999, 2001, and 2009. In 2010, the Nebula Award for Best Script, which was awarded for scripts from 1974 to 1978 and from 2000 to 2009, was discontinued. The Ray Bradbury Award, though still not considered an official Nebula category, was converted to follow the normal nomination and voting procedures of the Nebula Awards in its place. In 2019 SFWA announced that the award was considered a Nebula category, and the following year the award was retitled the Ray Bradbury Nebula Award for Outstanding Dramatic Presentation.

Nebula Award nominees and winners are chosen by members of SFWA, though the creators of the nominees do not need to be members. Works are nominated each year by members in a period around December 15 through January 31, and the six works that receive the most nominations then form the final ballot, with additional nominees possible in the case of ties. Soon after, members are given a month to vote on the ballot, and the final results are presented at the Nebula Awards ceremony in May. Members are not permitted to nominate their own works, and ties in the final vote are broken, if possible, by the number of nominations the works received. Prior to the 2009 awards, the eligibility period for nominations was defined as one year after the publication date of the work, which allowed the possibility for works to be nominated in the calendar year after their publication and then be awarded in the calendar year after that.

During the 17 nomination years, 101 works have been nominated, with 17 winners in addition to the 4 awards chosen without nominees in 1992–2009. A few franchises have seen multiple nominations; the Marvel Cinematic Universe has earned the most nominations with ten films, two television seasons, and one television episode, with one film and one television season winning. Other franchises with multiple nominations are Doctor Who with one win out of four nominated television episodes, Star Wars with three film and three television episode nominations, and The Good Place with one win out of three nominated television episodes. The award is typically for television episodes and films, but occasionally rewards works in other formats: the 1999 award was given to an entire television series and five other seasons have been nominated since, the 2001 award was given to a radio anthology series, and the 2009 award was given to a creator's entire filmography to date. Prior to the 2019 awards both the writers and directors were listed, but since then only writers have been noted.

== Winners and nominees ==
SFWA currently identifies the awards by the year of publication, that is, the year prior to the year in which the award is given. Entries with a yellow background and an asterisk (*) next to the writer's name have won the award; the other entries are the other nominees on the shortlist.

* Winners and joint winners

Ray Bradbury Award winners and nomineesWinners and nominees
Year	Work	Creator(s)	Publisher(s)	Ref.
1991	Terminator 2: Judgment Day*	James Cameron (director, writer), William Wisher Jr. (writer)	TriStar Pictures	
1998	Babylon 5*	J. Michael Straczynski (director, writer)	Babylonian Productions / Warner Bros. Domestic Television	
2000	2000X: Tales of the Next Millennia*	Yuri Rasovsky (writer), Harlan Ellison (writer)	NPR	
2008	Joss Whedon filmography*	Joss Whedon (writer)	multiple	
2009	District 9*	Neill Blomkamp (director, writer), Terri Tatchell (writer)	TriStar Pictures	
2009	Avatar	James Cameron (director, writer)	Twentieth Century Fox Film Corporation	
2009	Coraline	Henry Selick (director, writer)	Focus Features	
2009	Moon	Duncan Jones (director, writer), Nathan Parker (writer)	Sony Pictures	
2009	Star Trek	J. J. Abrams (director), Roberto Orci (writer), Alex Kurtzman (writer)	Paramount Pictures	
2009	Up	Pete Docter (director, writer), Bob Peterson (writer), Tom McCarthy (writer)	Pixar/Walt Disney Pictures	
2010	Inception*	Christopher Nolan (director, writer)	Warner Bros.	
2010	Despicable Me	Pierre Coffin (director), Cinco Paul (writer), Ken Daurio (writer)	Universal Pictures	
2010	Doctor Who: "Vincent and the Doctor"	Jonny Campbell (director), Richard Curtis (writer)	BBC	
2010	How To Train Your Dragon	Dean DeBlois (writer), Chris Sanders (writer), William Davies (writer)	Paramount Pictures	
2010	Scott Pilgrim vs. the World	Edgar Wright (director, writer), Michael Bacall (writer)	Universal Pictures	
2010	Toy Story 3	Michael Arndt (writer)	Pixar and Walt Disney Pictures	
2011	Doctor Who: "The Doctor's Wife"*	Richard Clark (director), Neil Gaiman (writer)	BBC Cymru Wales	
2011	The Adjustment Bureau	George Nolfi (director, writer)	Universal Pictures	
2011	Attack the Block	Joe Cornish (director, writer)	Optimum Releasing/Screen Gems	
2011	Captain America: The First Avenger	Joe Johnston (director), Christopher Markus (writer), Stephen McFeely (writer)	Paramount Pictures	
2011	Hugo	Martin Scorsese (director), John Logan (writer)	Paramount Pictures	
2011	Midnight in Paris	Woody Allen (director, writer)	Sony Pictures	
2011	Source Code	Duncan Jones (director) and Ben Ripley (writer)	Summit Entertainment	
2012	Beasts of the Southern Wild*	Benh Zeitlin (director, writer), Lucy Alibar (writer)	Journeyman/Cinereach/Court 13	
2012	The Avengers	Joss Whedon (director, writer), Zak Penn (writer)	Marvel Studios	
2012	The Cabin in the Woods	Drew Goddard (director, writer), Joss Whedon (writer)	Mutant Enemy Productions	
2012	The Hunger Games	Gary Ross (director, writer), Suzanne Collins (writer), and Billy Ray (writer)	Lionsgate	
2012	John Carter	Andrew Stanton (director, writer)	Walt Disney Pictures	
2012	Looper	Rian Johnson (director)	DMG Entertainment/Endgame Entertainment	
2013	Gravity*	Alfonso Cuarón (director, writer), Jonás Cuarón, (writer)	Warner Bros.	
2013	Doctor Who: "The Day of the Doctor"	Nick Hurran (director), Steven Moffat (writer)	BBC Cymru Wales	
2013	Europa Report	Sebastián Cordero (director), Philip Gelatt (writer)	Start Motion Pictures	
2013	Her	Spike Jonze (director, writer)	Warner Bros.	
2013	The Hunger Games: Catching Fire	Francis Lawrence (director), Simon Beaufoy (writer), Michael deBruyn (writer)	Lionsgate	
2013	Pacific Rim	Guillermo del Toro (director, writer), Travis Beacham (writer)	Warner Bros.	
2014	Guardians of the Galaxy*	James Gunn (writer), Nicole Perlman (writer)	Walt Disney Pictures	
2014	Birdman or (The Unexpected Virtue of Ignorance)	Alejandro González Iñárritu (writer), Nicolás Giacobone (writer), Alexander Dinelaris Jr. (writer), Armando Bó (writer)	Fox Searchlight	
2014	Captain America: The Winter Soldier	Christopher Markus (writer), Stephen McFeely (writer)	Walt Disney Pictures	
2014	Edge of Tomorrow	Christopher McQuarrie (writer), Jez Butterworth (writer), John-Henry Butterworth (writer)	Warner Bros.	
2014	Interstellar	Christopher Nolan (writer), Jonathan Nolan (writer)	Paramount Pictures	
2014	The Lego Movie	Phil Lord (writer), Christopher Miller (writer)	Warner Bros.	
2015	Mad Max: Fury Road*	George Miller (director, writer), Brendan McCarthy (writer), Nico Lathouris (writer)	Village Roadshow Pictures/Kennedy Miller Mitchell/RatPac-Dune Entertainment	
2015	Ex Machina	Alex Garland (director, writer), Bradley Thompson (director, writer), David Weddle (director, writer)	Film4 Productions/DNA Films	
2015	Inside Out	Pete Docter (director, writer), Ronnie del Carmen (writer), Meg LeFauve (writer), Josh Cooley (writer)	Walt Disney Pictures/Pixar	
2015	Jessica Jones: "AKA Smile"	Michael Rymer (director), Scott Reynolds (writer), Melissa Rosenberg (writer), Jamie King (writer)	Marvel Television/ABC Studios/Tall Girls Productions	
2015	The Martian	Ridley Scott (director), Drew Goddard (writer)	Scott Free Productions/Kinberg Genre	
2015	Star Wars: The Force Awakens	J. J. Abrams (director, writer), Lawrence Kasdan (writer), Michael Arndt (writer)	Lucasfilm/Bad Robot Productions	
2016	Arrival*	Denis Villeneuve (director), Eric Heisserer (writer)	21 Laps Entertainment/FilmNation Entertainment/Lava Bear Films/Xenolinguistics	
2016	Doctor Strange	Scott Derrickson (director, writer), C. Robert Cargill (writer)	Marvel Studios/Walt Disney Pictures	
2016	Kubo and the Two Strings	Travis Knight (director), Mark Haimes (writer), Chris Butler (writer)	Laika	
2016	Rogue One: A Star Wars Story	Gareth Edwards (director), Chris Weitz (writer), Tony Gilroy (writer)	Lucasfilm/Walt Disney Pictures	
2016	Westworld: "The Bicameral Mind"	Jonathan Nolan (director, writer), Lisa Joy (writer)	HBO	
2016	Zootopia	Byron Howard (director), Jared Bush (writer), Phil Johnston (writer)	Walt Disney Pictures	
2017	Get Out*	Jordan Peele (director, writer)	Universal Pictures	
2017	The Good Place: "Michael's Gambit"	Michael Schur (director, writer)	NBC	
2017	Logan	James Mangold (director, writer), Scott Frank (writer), Michael Green (writer)	20th Century Fox	
2017	The Shape of Water	Guillermo del Toro (director, writer), Vanessa Taylor (writer)	Fox Searchlight Pictures	
2017	Star Wars: The Last Jedi	Rian Johnson (director, writer)	Lucasfilm	
2017	Wonder Woman	Patty Jenkins (director), Allan Heinberg (writer)	Warner Bros.	
2018	Spider-Man: Into the Spider-Verse*	Phil Lord (writer), Rodney Rothman (writer)	Sony Pictures Animation	
2018	Black Panther	Ryan Coogler (writer), Joe Robert Cole (writer)	Marvel Studios	
2018	Dirty Computer	Janelle Monáe (writer), Chuck Lightning (writer)	Wondaland Arts Society/Bad Boy Records/Atlantic Records	
2018	The Good Place: "Jeremy Bearimy"	Megan Amram (writer)	NBC	
2018	A Quiet Place	John Krasinski (writer), Bryan Woods (writer), Scott Beck (writer)	Platinum Dunes/Sunday Night Productions	
2018	Sorry to Bother You	Boots Riley (writer)	Annapurna Pictures	
2019	Good Omens: "Hard Times"*	Neil Gaiman (writer)	Amazon Studios/BBC Studios	
2019	Avengers: Endgame	Christopher Markus (writer), Stephen McFeely (writer)	Marvel Studios	
2019	Captain Marvel	Anna Boden (writer), Geneva Robertson-Dworet (writer), Ryan Fleck (writer)	Marvel Studios	
2019	The Mandalorian: "The Child"	Jon Favreau (writer)	Disney+	
2019	Russian Doll: "The Way Out"	Allison Silverman (writer), Leslye Headland (writer)	Netflix	
2019	Watchmen: "A God Walks into Abar"	Jeff Jensen (writer), Damon Lindelof (writer)	HBO	
2020	The Good Place: "Whenever You're Ready"*	Michael Schur (writer)	NBC, Fremulon/3 Arts Entertainment/Universal	
2020	Birds of Prey: And the Fantabulous Emancipation of One Harley Quinn	Christina Hodson (writer)	Warner Bros. Television Studios, Clubhouse Pictures/DC Films/Kroll & Co. Entertainment/LuckyChap Entertainment	
2020	The Expanse: "Gaugamela"	Dan Nowak (writer)	Amazon Prime, Alcon Entertainment/Alcon Television Group/Amazon Studios/Hivemind/Just So	
2020	Lovecraft Country (season 1)	Misha Green (writer), Shannon Houston (writer), Kevin Lau (writer), Wes Taylor (writer), Ihuoma Ofordire (writer), Jonathan I. Kidd (writer), and Sonya Winton-Odamtten (writer)	HBO Max, Bad Robot Productions/Monkeypaw Productions/Warner Bros. Television Studios	
2020	The Mandalorian: "The Tragedy"	Jon Favreau (writer)	Disney+, Golem Creations/Lucasfilm	
2020	The Old Guard	Greg Rucka (writer)	Netflix, Skydance Media/Denver and Delilah Productions/Marc Evans Productions	
2021	WandaVision (season 1)*	Peter Cameron (writer), Mackenzie Dohr (writer), Laura Donney (writer), Bobak Esfarjani (writer), Megan McDonnell (writer), Jac Schaeffer (writer), Cameron Squires (writer), Gretchen Enders (writer), Chuck Hayward (writer)	Marvel Studios	
2021	Encanto	Charise Castro Smith (writer), Jared Bush (writer), Byron Howard (writer), Jason Hand (writer), Nancy Kruse (writer), Lin-Manuel Miranda (writer)	Walt Disney Animation Studios/Walt Disney Pictures	
2021	The Green Knight	David Lowery (writer)	Sailor Bear/Bron Studios/A24	
2021	Loki (season 1)	Bisha K. Ali (writer), Elissa Karasik (writer), Eric Martin (writer), Michael Waldron (writer), Tom Kauffman (writer), Jess Dweck (writer)	Marvel Studios	
2021	Shang-Chi and the Legend of the Ten Rings	David Callaham (writer), Destin Daniel Cretton (writer), Andrew Lanham (writer)	Marvel Studios/Walt Disney Pictures	
2021	Space Sweepers	Jo Sung-hee (writer)	Bidangil Pictures	
2021	What We Do in the Shadows (season 3)	Jake Bender (writer), Zach Dunn (writer), Shana Gohd (writer), Sam Johnson (writer), Chris Marcil (writer), William Meny (writer), Sarah Naftalis (writer), Stefani Robinson (writer), Marika Sawyer (writer), Paul Simms (writer), Lauren Wells (writer)	FX Productions/Two Canoes Pictures/343 Incorporated/FX Network	
2022	Everything Everywhere All at Once*	Daniel Kwan (writer), Daniel Scheinert (writer)	A24/AGBO/IAC Films	
2022	Andor: "One Way Out"	Beau Willimon (writer), Tony Gilroy (writer)	Lucasfilm/Disney+	
2022	Nope	Jordan Peele (writer)	Universal Pictures	
2022	Our Flag Means Death (season 1)	David Jenkins (writer), Eliza Jiménez Cossio (writer), Zayre Ferrer (writer), William Meny (writer), Maddie Dai (writer), Alyssa Lane (writer), John Mahone (writer), Simone Nathan (writer), Natalie Torres (writer), Zackery Alexzander Stephens (writer), Alex J. Sherman (writer), Jes Tom (writer), Adam Stein (writer)	Dive/HBO Max	
2022	The Sandman (season 1)	Neil Gaiman (writer), Lauren Bello (writer), Vanessa Benton (writer), Mike Dringenberg (writer), Sam Kieth (writer), Catherine Smyth-McMullen (writer), Heather Bellson (writer), Jim Campolongo (writer), Jay Franklin (writer), Austin Guzman (writer), Alexander Newman-Wise (writer), Ameni Rozsa (writer), David S. Goyer (writer), Allan Heinberg (writer)	DC Entertainment/Netflix	
2022	Severance (season 1)	Dan Erickson (writer), Chris Black (writer), Andrew Colville (writer), Amanda Overton (writer), Anna Ouyang Moench (writer), Helen Leigh (writer), Kari Drake (writer), Mark Friedman (writer)	Endeavor Content/Red Hour Productions/Apple TV+	
2023	Barbie*	Greta Gerwig (writer), Noah Baumbach (writer)	Warner Bros., Heyday Films, LuckyChap Entertainment	
2023	Nimona	Robert L. Baird (writer), Lloyd Taylor (writer), Pamela Ribon (writer), Marc Haimes (writer), Nick Bruno (writer), Troy Quane (writer), Keith Bunin (writer), Nate Stevenson (writer)	Annapurna Animation, Annapurna Pictures	
2023	The Last of Us: "Long, Long Time"	Neil Druckmann (writer), Craig Mazin (writer)	HBOMax	
2023	Dungeons & Dragons: Honor Among Thieves	Jonathan Goldstein (writer), John Francis Daley (writer), Michael Gilio (writer), Chris McKay (writer)	Paramount Pictures, Entertainment One, Allspark Pictures	
2023	Spider-Man: Across the Spider-Verse	Phil Lord (writer), Christopher Miller (writer), David Callaham (writer)	Columbia Pictures, Marvel Entertainment, Avi Arad Productions	
2023	The Boy and the Heron	Hayao Miyazaki (writer)	Studio Ghibli, Toho	
2024	Dune: Part Two*	Jon Spaihts (writer), Denis Villeneuve (writer)	Warner Bros	
2024	Doctor Who: "Dot and Bubble"	Russell T Davies (writer)	BBC	
2024	I Saw the TV Glow	Jane Schoenbrun (writer)	A24 Films	
2024	KAOS	Charlie Covell (writer), Georgia Christou (writer)	Netflix	
2024	Star Trek: Lower Decks (season 5)	Mike McMahan (writer)	Paramount+	
2024	Wicked	Winnie Holzman (writer), Dana Fox (writer)	Universal Pictures	
2025	Murderbot (season 1)	Paul Weitz (writer), Chris Weitz (writer)	Apple TV+	
2025	KPop Demon Hunters	Danya Jimenez (writer), Maggie Kang (writer), Hannah McMechan (writer)	Netflix	
2025	Sinners	Ryan Coogler (writer)	Warner Bros. Pictures	
2025	Severance: "Chikhai Bardo"	Dan Erickson (writer), Mark Friedman (writer)	Apple TV+	
2025	Pluribus (season 1)	Vince Gilligan (writer)	Apple TV+	
2025	Superman	James Gunn (writer)	Warner Bros. Pictures	
