= Slashmusic =

Podcast presented by Tom Ravenscroft (2006–2007)

Slashmusic was a podcast presented by Tom Ravenscroft for Channel 4 Radio. Forty shows were made available between August 2006 and June 2007. The show was produced by Hermeet Chadhar, who had formerly produced a Radio 1 show for John Peel, Ravenscroft's father. The podcast was relaunched in January 2008 under the name New Music Download.

The show was originally a 30-minute podcast, and was later extended to 45 minutes due to demand from listeners (although the show often extended to around an hour in length).

== Music ==
=== Channel 4 Unsigned ===
The show was intended to showcase music from the Channel 4 Unsigned music pages (from which the show took its name, i.e. www.channel4.com/music), but the time was often filled with tracks taken from other sources. Ravenscroft said of the Unsigned pages,

Despite my initial apprehensions of what I would find on Channel 4's MyMusic website, the job of trawling through its 20,000 tracks has proved hugely entertaining and we found some brilliant music.

=== Sessions ===
The show also featured sessions especially recorded for the show:

Show	Date	Artist
3	9 September 2006	Pants Yell!
6	24 September 2006	gay against you
9	18 October 2006	Misosoup
11	1 November 2006	'In the City', live in Manchester
14	23 November 2006	Genghis Tron
17	14 December 2006	Pocket Promise
20	4 January 2007	Splen
24	1 February 2007	Poq
28	8 March 2007	Rolo Tomassi
31	29 March 2007	Neural Sonic Combustion
34	19 April 2007	Ergo Phizmiz
36	3 May 2007	Berlin Special
38	17 May 2007	Jesus Licks
41	7 June 2007	Hotplate

Show 11 was a series of live performances recorded in Manchester, and featured The Fourers, Cutting Pink With Knives, Suzy Mangion, 65daysofstatic and Hotplate.

Show 36 was recorded in Berlin and featured specially recorded tracks by Milenasong and Malta.
