= Jelena Džankić =

Political scientist

- Occupation: Political scientist
- Title: Co-Director of the Global Citizenship Observatory
- Awards: Marie Curie Action Fellowship

Academic background
- Education: University of Cambridge (New Hall/Murray Edwards College)
- Website: https://globalcit.eu/team/dzankic-jelena/

Jelena Džankić is Co-Director of the Global Citizenship Observatory (GLOBALCIT) and part-time professor at the European University Institute, Florence, Italy.

== Career ==
Džankić studied Political Science/International Relations and European Studies at the American University in Bulgaria. She received her PhD in International Studies from the University of Cambridge where she focused on nationalism in the new states in the Western Balkans. Džankić researches the wealth-based acquisition of citizenship, state and nation building, and Europeanisation. She is a part-time professor at the European University Institute's Global Governance Programme and Co-Director of the Global Citizenship Observatory (GLOBALCIT) at the Robert Schuman Centre for Advanced Studies. She had previously taught and researched at the University of Edinburgh, University College London, University of Graz, and Passau University.

Džankić is author of Global Market for Investor Citizenship and Citizenship in Bosnia Herzegovina, Macedonia and Montenegro : Effects of Statehood and Identity Challenges. She has also published articles, book chapters and opinion pieces.

Džankić received a Marie Curie Fellowship through the European Commission for her project In the Frame of Party Competition: Citizenship, Voting Rights and Nation-Building in the Post-Yugoslav Space. She has also received the Chevening Scholarship, Cambridge Trusts Scholarship, and the Marshall Memorial Fellowship of the German Marshal Fund of the United States. She was a guest on Al Jazeera, CBC Radio and Channel 4 Radio programs discussing the sale of citizenships and passports.

== Books ==
Džankić's books include:

- The Global Market for Investor Citizenship, Palgrave, 2019.
- Europeanisation of the Western Balkans: A failure of EU Conditionality?, edited with S. Keil and M. Kmezic, Palgrave, 2018.
- Citizenship in Bosnia Herzegovina, Macedonia and Montenegro : Effects of Statehood and Identity Challenges, Routledge, 2015.
