= Norman Corwin =

American writer, screenwriter and radio producer (1910–2011)

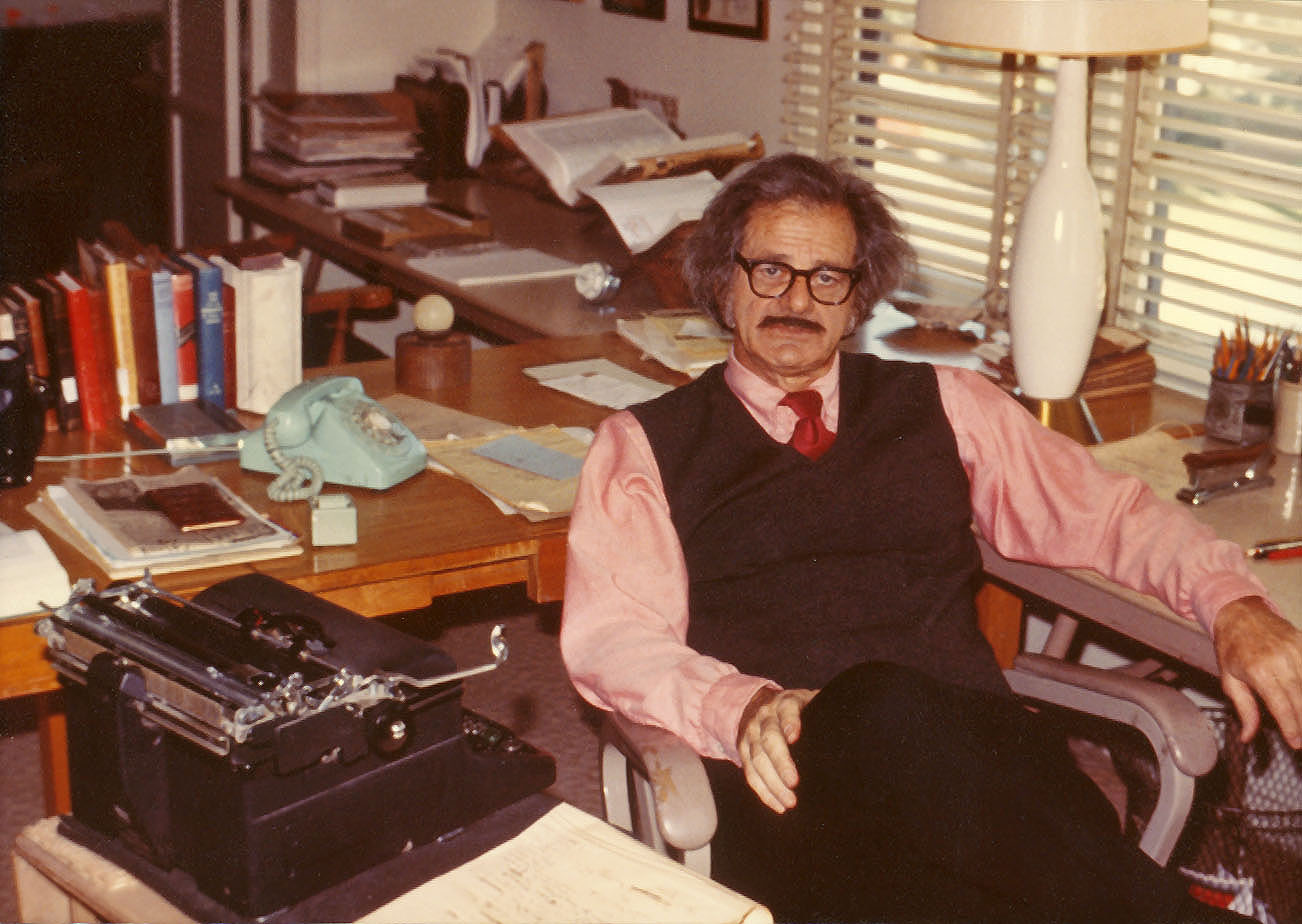
- Norman Corwin with typewriter, 1973
- Born: Norman Lewis Corwin; May 3, 1910; Boston, Massachusetts, U.S.
- Died: October 18, 2011 (aged 101); Los Angeles, California, U.S.
- Occupations: Writer; producer; director; teacher
- Spouse: Katherine Locke (m. 1947; died 1995)
- Children: 2

Norman Lewis Corwin (May 3, 1910 – October 18, 2011) was an American writer, screenwriter, producer, essayist and teacher of journalism and writing. His earliest and biggest successes were in the writing and directing of radio drama during the 1930s and 1940s.

Corwin was among the first producers to regularly use entertainment – even light entertainment – to tackle serious social issues. In this area, he was a peer of Orson Welles and William N. Robson, and an inspiration to other later radio/TV writers such as Rod Serling, Gene Roddenberry, Norman Lear, J. Michael Straczynski and Yuri Rasovsky. His work was very influential on successful creative and performing artists, including Ray Bradbury, Charles Kuralt, The Firesign Theatre, Robert Altman, and Robin Williams among many others.

A major figure during the Golden Age of Radio, his work was very influential both at the time and later. He has been called "The Grand Master of American Audio Theatre". During the 1930s and 1940s he was a writer and producer of many radio programs in many genres: history, biography, fantasy, fiction, poetry and drama. He was the writer and creator of series such as The Columbia Workshop, 13 by Corwin, 26 by Corwin and others. After leaving the CBS Network, he was Head of Special Media Programming for the United Nations in the early 1950s, producing radio programs explaining the U.N.'s organization and goals, and documenting some of its efforts worldwide. He was a lecturer in journalism at the University of Southern California until he was 97.

A documentary film on Corwin's life, A Note of Triumph: The Golden Age of Norman Corwin, won an Academy Award for Best Documentary (Short Feature) in 2006. Les Guthman's feature documentary on Mr. Corwin's career, Corwin aired on PBS in the 1990s. He was inducted into the Pacific Pioneer Broadcasters Diamond Circle in 1994.

On Corwin's 100th birthday, the Writers Guild of America West gave him a "Gala" in Hollywood, which was hosted by Leonard Maltin and featured live performances of two of his favorite works and birthday speeches and reminiscences by many people, including Carl Reiner, Hal Kanter, William Shatner, and others. On that occasion, the National Audio Theatre Festival organization announced the creation of the Norman Corwin Award for Excellence in Audio Theatre, which is given annually to an individual or group who have made significant contributions to the art form in the United States.

== Early years ==
Norman Lewis Corwin was born in Boston, the third of four children born to Rose, a homemaker, and Samuel, a printer. They raised their family in East Boston, MA, before moving to Winthrop, Massachusetts when Norman was thirteen. Norman graduated from Winthrop High School, but unlike his brothers, he did not attend college. His earliest goal was to be a writer. Due to his interest in writing, he sought a position in journalism and was ultimately hired by the Greenfield (MA) Recorder as a cub reporter when he was only seventeen. In Greenfield, he reported on the courts and was also a film critic. Several years later, Corwin was hired by the Springfield (MA) Republican.

== Radio career ==
While living and working in Springfield in the early 1930s, he became involved with radio broadcasting. He first worked as the radio editor of the Springfield Republican and subsequently began broadcasting his own radio program. The date of his first broadcast has been reported as early as 1931 by R. Leroy Bannerman; but the Springfield (MA) Republican reported that his first program, Rhymes and Cadences, a show during which Corwin read poetry, and his friend Benjamin Kalman offered musical interludes on the piano, debuted in March 1934 on WBZ in Boston and WBZA in Springfield. As radio editor of the Republican, he became known for his column "Radiosyncracies," which he published under the pseudonym 'Vladimir Shrdlu.' He also worked as a news commentator over WBZ and WBZA. In June 1935, Corwin accepted an executive position in Cincinnati at station WLW. By 1937, Corwin was hired to host a poetry program called "Poetic License" on New York station WQXR, which led to his being hired by the CBS Radio Network to produce and direct cultural programs. He remained with CBS until 1949.

The first program he produced and hosted for CBS was Words Without Music, the goal of which, Corwin said, was to make poetry more entertaining. It went on the air over CBS affiliate WABC in New York in early December 1938. Corwin continued to produce and host a wide range of programs for CBS. In December 1941, he created a program to commemorate the 150th anniversary of the United States Bill of Rights: We Hold These Truths, first broadcast on December 15, 1941. Corwin said it was written at the "invitation" of the U.S. Office of Facts and Figures. He recalled being on a train on his way to California to produce the program when news of the attack on Pearl Harbor came to him. He sent a telegram to Washington at the next stop, asking if the OFF still wanted the program done. When he got to Albuquerque, a telegram was waiting for him: "the President says, 'now more than ever.'" Many radio and movie stars of the day featured, along with an epilogue by President Franklin Delano Roosevelt. With an audience of 60 million listeners it became one of the most famous programs ever produced on radio. In 1941, he received a Peabody Award for that program.

In 1942, Corwin and Edward R. Murrow combined to produce An American in England on CBS radio. Corwin intentionally avoided interviewing government officials, choosing instead to focus on everyday people and how they were affected by the war. He made weekly reports from England via shortwave August 3 – September 7, then did four more episodes December 1–22 after he had returned to New York City.

Corwin's most famous work is On a Note of Triumph, a celebration of the Allied victory in Europe, first broadcast on VE Day, May 8, 1945. Not knowing where he would be when the end came, broadcast historian Erik Barnouw wrote, Corwin had performers ready in both New York City and Los Angeles. The program went on (from the Los Angeles studios of CBS Radio Station KNX), with Martin Gabel as host/narrator and with William L. Shirer (via cable from New York) re-creating his role as reporter in the Compiègne forest covering the French surrender to Germany. This critically acclaimed broadcast earned him a Distinguished Achievement Award from Radio Life magazine. Corwin wrote a similar program for CBS, Fourteen August, which was broadcast on V-J Day.

Corwin was also the first winner of the One World Award established by the Common Council for American Unity along with the (Wendell) Willkie Memorial of Freedom House. The award's winner was given an around the world trip. He won the award for his contributions in the field of mass communication to the concept of the world becoming more unified. In June 1946, he set out from New York for a 4-month journey. He interviewed both world leaders and ordinary citizens, accompanied by a CBS recording engineer with 225 pounds of magnetic wire recording equipment. His 100 hours of recorded interviews was transcribed and took up 3700 pages. The CBS network then molded his work into a 13-part documentary that was aired in the Winter and Spring of 1947. Programs featured Great Britain, Western Europe, Sweden and Poland, Russia, Czechoslovakia, Italy, Egypt and India, Shanghai and Cities of the Far East, The Philippines, Australia, and New Zealand.

== Post-CBS career ==
After leaving CBS in March 1949, Corwin went to work for the radio division of the United Nations; in charge of special projects, his first production was "Citizen of the World" in July 1949. He ultimately left radio around 1952; some sources say he was frustrated by what he felt was radio's over-reaction to McCarthyism; other sources say he left radio after persistent accusations that he was a Communist sympathizer, a charge which he always vehemently denied. The House Un-American Activities Committee also named him among a number of other entertainers and performers in a 1951 list of alleged Communist sympathizers. The list included conductor Leonard Bernstein, actor Lee J. Cobb, and architect Frank Lloyd Wright. After leaving radio, Corwin produced some work for television, including his first televised play, "Ann Rutledge," which starred Grace Kelly. He also wrote a number of motion picture screenplays, including The Blue Veil (1951), Scandal at Scourie (1953), Lust for Life (1956), and The Story of Ruth (1961). With regard to writing the screenplay for Lust for Life, based upon the Irving Stone biography, Corwin told American Legends website: "While I thought that Irving Stone did a good job of introducing Vincent Van Gogh to the American public, the book was somehow not mature for a screenplay. So I decided to read Van Gogh's letters, and, in doing so, I was aware that no one could write about Van Gogh better than he wrote about himself. I persuaded John (Houseman) that the picture should be based on Van Gogh's letters, and he agreed." In the early 1970s, Corwin produced and hosted the television show Norman Corwin Presents. In 1979 he hosted Academy Leaders, a weekly showcase for short films which had won or been nominated for an Academy Award. Corwin wrote several books, which include Trivializing America; plus many essays, letters, articles and plays, two of which he also directed and produced on Broadway, The Rivalry (1959) and The World of Carl Sandburg (1960).

In the 1980s, Corwin was one of the writing teachers of J. Michael Straczynski, creator of the television series Babylon 5. Stracyzynski named a recurring character in the series, David Corwin, after Norman. On the rec.arts.babylon5.moderated Usenet newsgroup, Stracyzynski wrote a series of posts on Norman Corwin's work.

Composer David Raksin's "reverent orchestral theme" for the 1950 MGM film The Next Voice You Hear... was later published with original lyrics by Corwin as a hymn, "Hasten the Day".

During the 1990s, Corwin returned to radio drama, producing a series of radio plays for National Public Radio. In 1993, Corwin was finally inducted into the Radio Hall of Fame after a long career. And in 2001, NPR aired six new plays by Corwin under the title More By Corwin. He also lectured at USC as a visiting professor and was also on the advisory board of the National Audio Theatre Festival. Corwin celebrated his 100th birthday in May 2010. Corwin died at the age of 101 on October 18, 2011.

== Personal life ==
Corwin was married in 1947 to actress Katherine Locke. They had two children – an adopted son, Anthony Leon, and a daughter, Diane Arlene. Katherine Locke died in 1995. Corwin died in 2011, at age 101. His father, Samuel, died in 1987 at age 110. His older brother, Emil, retired at 96 from a distinguished federal government career, and died in 2011 at age 107.

== Works ==
=== "Golden Age" works in radio drama ===
Corwin wrote and produced over 100 programs during the golden age of radio. Notable programs include:

- The Plot to Overthrow Christmas – December 25, 1938
- They Fly through the Air with the Greatest of Ease – February 19, 1939
- Spoon River Anthology – March 1939
- Descent of the Gods – August 3, 1940
- Mary and the Fairy – August 31, 1940
- Psalm for a Dark Year – November 9, 1940
- We Hold These Truths – December 15, 1941
- America at War (series) – February 14, 1942
- The Lonesome Train – March 21, 1944
- Untitled – May 30, 1944
- Home For the 4th – July 4, 1944
- El Capitan and the Corporal – July 25, 1944
- On a Note of Triumph – May 8, 1945
- The Undecided Molecule – July 17, 1945
- 14 August – August 14, 1945
- God and Uranium – August 19, 1945
- Hollywood Fights Back – October 26, 1947
- Could Be – September 8, 1949
- Document A/777 – March 26, 1950

=== Later works in radio drama ===
In recent years National Public Radio commissioned a number of new plays by Corwin; the series was called More By Corwin.

- Our Lady Of The Freedoms, And Some Of Her Friends – A play about the Statue of Liberty.
- No Love Lost – A lively debate about the nature of democracy in America, in the form of an imaginary dialogue between Thomas Jefferson, Alexander Hamilton and Aaron Burr; the work is based on their writings. This play featured Lloyd Bridges, Jack Lemmon, Martin Landau and Corwin's friend William Shatner. Shatner appeared in a number of Corwin productions.
- The Writer With The Lame Left Hand – Based on the life story of Miguel de Cervantes, author of Don Quixote. This production featured Ed Asner, Charles Durning, Samantha Eggar and William Shatner.
- The Curse Of 589 is a comedy about a physicist (William Shatner) who comes across an honest-to-goodness real life fairy, with a working magic wand.
- The Secretariat – A play on the meaning of prayer. This production featured Hume Cronyn and Jessica Tandy, Phil Proctor, and William Shatner.
- 50 Years after 14 August – A reflection on the end of World War II; co-produced with Dan Gediman.

=== Published works ===
A selected listing of books by Corwin, excluding collections of his radio dramas:

- So Say the Wise: A Community Of Modern Mind, New York: George Sully Company, 1929 – A compendium of quotations, concentrating on current personalities. Compiled by Corwin and Hazel Cooley.
- Holes in a Stained Glass Window, Secaucus, NJ: L. Stuart, 1978 – Collection of Corwin's Essays, Articles and Poetry. Contains both Prayer for the 70s and Jerusalem Printout
- Overkill and megalove, Cleveland, OH: World Publishing Company, 1963 – book about the horror of nuclear war. It includes a fantasy documentary script “Could Be”, broadcast in 1949, which imagines “what could happen if the nations of the world got together and attacked common problems with the same vigor, determination and resources with which, from time to time, they have attacked each other.”
- Trivializing America, Secaucus, NJ: Lyle Stuart, 1983 – A best-selling critique of the failings of contemporary American culture
- Norman Corwin's Letters, edited by Jack Langguth – New York: Barricade Books Inc., 1994 – Compilation of letters written throughout Corwin's career.

Addendum: The Plot to Overthrow Christmas (Opera; music by Walter Scharf; libretto by Norman Corwin) was written in 1960; sole performance in 2000 at Brigham Young University. The opera exists in manuscript form only. Composer and Librettest unable to agree on terms for further use. Walter Scharf died in 2003.

=== Other ===
- The Warrior, opera in one act with a libretto by Corwin and music by Bernard Rogers. Premiered at the Metropolitan Opera in January 1947.

== Awards/honors ==
Corwin won a One World Award, two Peabody Medals, an Emmy Award, a Golden Globe Award, a duPont-Columbia Award; he was nominated for an Academy Award for Writing Adapted Screenplay for Lust for Life (1956). On May 12, 1990, he received an Honorary Doctorate from Lincoln College. In 1996, he received the Doctor of Humane Letters honoris causa from California Lutheran University. Corwin was inducted into the National Radio Hall of Fame in 1993.

== General and cited references ==
- "Radio Hall of Fame". Norman Corwin. Archived from the original on May 26, 2011.
