= National Radio Theater =

The National Radio Theater was a non-profit independent producer of radio plays created in Chicago by Yuri Rasovsky and Michelle M. Faith. The company produced a radio drama anthology series called The National Radio Theater of Chicago, which ran on classical FM station WFMT from January 1973 to April 1986. The production company disbanded in 1987.

Episodes consisted of original radio plays, adaptations of fiction and stage plays, and radio plays from Europe and the Far East. Its programs were heard primarily over public radio stations around the country, but were picked up in many other English speaking countries. The program won two Peabody Awards, in 1978 and 1981.
