= National Audio Theatre Festival =

American media company

The National Audio Theatre Festivals, Inc. (NATF) is a US-based organization sponsoring a yearly, five-day workshop on radio drama, voice-over and the audio arts, as well as other special training. Participants take classes on subjects such as voiceover and voice acting, audio engineering, Foley and special effects, audio playwriting and podcasting, and more. The workshop is helmed by professionals in the field and is frequently held in the small city of West Plains, Missouri.

The last day of the festival is a live performance of audio drama, carried over local radio, as well as streamed live over the internet. The night's entertainment includes original radio plays performed by attendees, and a short workshop play written and produced by first-time conference participants.

Many participants of the National Audio Theatre Festivals' Audio Theatre Workshop have notable careers in the audio arts, such as Yuri Rasovsky, the members of the Firesign Theatre, and Tom Lopez (producer and founder of ZBS Foundation). Groups which frequently participate or support the NATF mission include the Atlanta Radio Theatre Company, Firesign Theatre, ZBS Foundation, the Willamette Radio Theatre, and many more.

== History ==
The National Audio Theatre Festivals, Inc. (NATF) evolved from its predecessor, the Midwest Radio Theatre Workshop. In 1979, a number of radio theater enthusiasts, based around community radio station KOPN, decided to stage a teaching workshop on the radio arts. The host was Jim Jordan, of Fibber McGee and Molly fame, and also included Firesign Theatre regulars David Ossman and Peter Bergman.

For twenty years, this five-day workshop continued under the MRTW name. In 2001, the National Audio Theatre Festivals became the new sponsor of this weeklong event and workshop. The NATF also sponsors the Norman Corwin Award for Excellence in Audio Theatre, the only award of its kind in America given to American audio dramatists with a significant body of work, or who have made significant contributions to the art form. The first award was presented to Corwin on the occasion of his 100th birthday, with Awards handed to Tom Lopez and Yuri Rasovsky in 2011.

Another aspect of the festival confers prizes for writing scripts which are submitted to win that year's awards and published in an anthology of the winning scripts. New and established writers compete and the top winning scripts are read to an audience. The organisation's mentoring casts a wide net to gather a wide range of cultures, styles, and genres. The 2000 NATF Scriptbook included a 30-minute comedy-drama by poet Hedwig Gorski about Polish American immigrants living in New Orleans during 1981 when martial law was declared in Poland. The main character uses voodoo against the oppressors of Solidarność.

This festival went virtual in 2020.
