= Yuri Rasovsky =

American dramatist

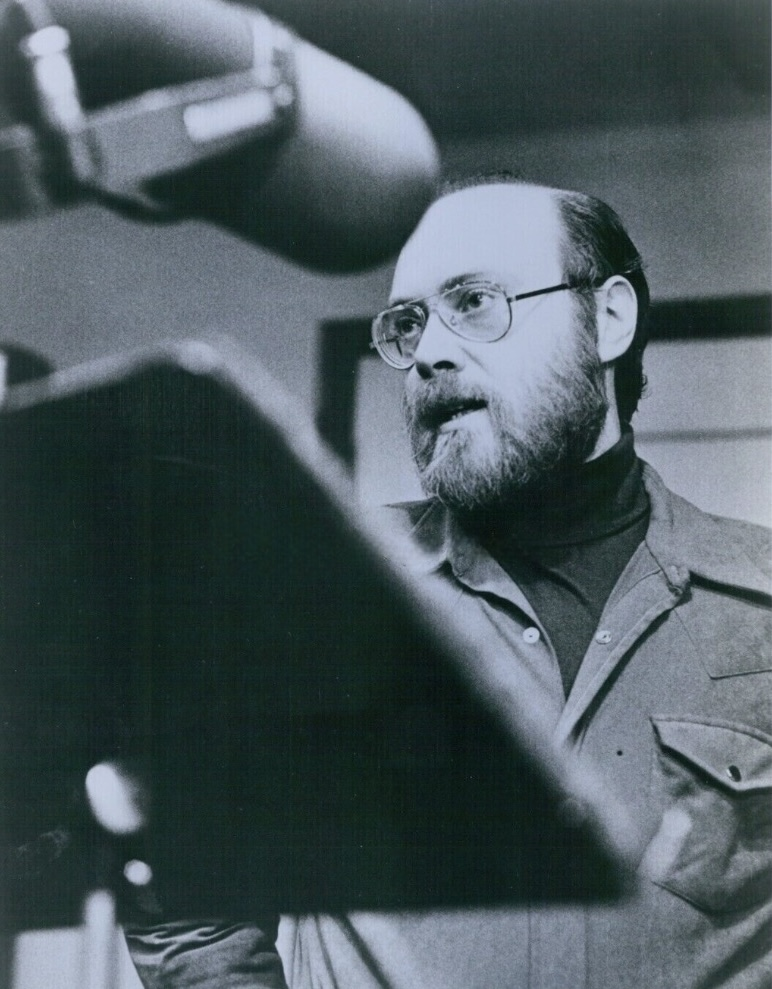
- Rasovsky in 1982
- Born: July 29, 1944
- Died: January 18, 2012 (aged 67)
- Occupation: Radio drama writer
- Partner: Lorna Raver (m. 1986)

Yuri Rasovsky (July 29, 1944 – January 18, 2012) was an American writer and producer working in radio drama in the United States.

He founded and operated The National Radio Theater of Chicago from 1973 to 1986 and later formed the Hollywood Theater of the Ear (since 1993). In the 1990s, he forsook radio for audiobooks. Many of his radio plays have been published as commercial recordings or as Internet downloads. His new plays are being released by Blackstone Audio. He died in 2012 of esophageal cancer.

== Major works ==
Rasovsky wrote, directed, or produced more than 150 audio plays. Notable examples include:

- The Chicago Language Tape. WFMT. 1972.
- The Odyssey of Homer. National Radio Theatre of Chicago. 1980. Winner of a George Foster Peabody Award.
- By His Bootstraps. Pacifica Foundation. 1984. Mark Time's Science Fiction Audio Hall of Fame.
- Craven Street. American Dialogues Radio. 1993.
- The Cabinet of Dr. Caligari. Based on the silent film. Hollywood Theater of the Ear. Revised 1998.
- 2000X: Tales of the Next Millennium (series of 26 one-hr programs). NPR, Hollywood Theater of the Ear. 1999–2000. Winner of a Bradbury Award.
- Sweeney Todd and The String of Pearls. Blackstone Audio, Hollywood Theater of the Ear. 2007. Winner of three 2008 Audie Awards: Best Audio Drama, Best Audiobook Original and Distinguished Achievement in Production.
- The Maltese Falcon, with Michael Madsen, Sandra Oh, Edward Herrmann. Blackstone Audio, Hollywood Theater of the Ear. 2008. Grammy nominated. Winner Audie Award: Best Adaptation.
- Saint Joan, with Amy Irving, Edward Herrmann, Kristoffer Tabori, Gregory Itzin, Armin Shimerman, Granville Van Dusen, et al.. Blackstone Audio, Hollywood Theater of the Ear. 2010. Winner Audie Award: Best Audio Drama of 2010.
- The Mark of Zorro, with Val Kilmer, Blackstone Audio, Hollywood Theater of the Ear. 2011. Grammy nominated.

== Books ==
He was the author of The Well-tempered Audio Dramatist (National Audio Theatre Festivals, 2006) and, with Carol Madden Adorjan, co-author of WKID: Easy Radio Plays for Children (Albert Whitman & Co., 1987).

== Awards ==
Over the past three-plus decades, Rasovsky's audio work has won:

- two George Foster Peabody Awards,
- three Grammy nominations and another Grammy Award,
- five Ohio State awards,
- nine Audie Awards,
- four Major Armstrong awards,
- four Publishers Weekly Listen Up awards,
- two Corporation for Public Broadcasting awards,
- the Independent Publishers' Audio Award,
- the Gabriel Award,
- the NFCB Golden Reel,
- Mark Time Lifetime Achievement Award,
- Booklist Editor's Pick
- the Science Fiction and Fantasy Writers of America Bradbury Award.

== Notable relatives ==
- Barney Ross
- Solomon Rosowsky
- Baruch Leib Rosowsky

== See also ==
- Thomas Lopez
- National Audio Theatre Festival
- Norman Corwin
- Arch Oboler
- Giles Cooper
