= Voice-over =

Non-diegetic speech in media

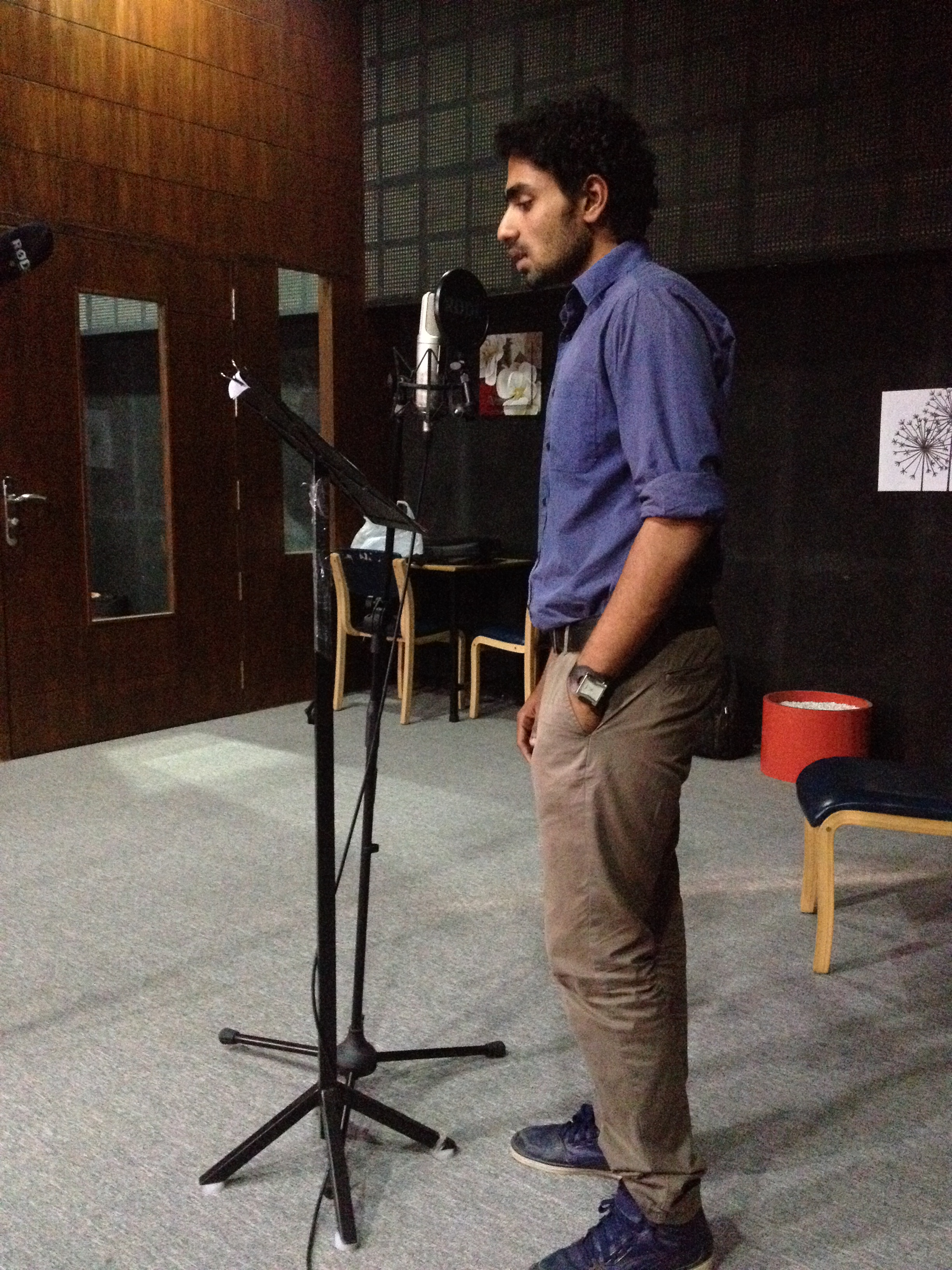
A man recording a voice-over

Voice-over (also known as off-camera or off-stage commentary) is a production technique used in radio, television, film, theatre, and other media in which a descriptive or expository voice provides verbal narration, accompanying the events of a narrative from outside the universe of the narrative or while breaking the fourth wall (i.e. non-diegetically). The voice-over is read from a script and may be spoken by someone who appears elsewhere in the production or by a specialist voice actor. Synchronous dialogue, where the voice-over is narrating the action that is taking place at the same time, remains the most common technique in voice-overs. Asynchronous, however, is also used in cinema. It is usually prerecorded and placed over the top of a film or video and commonly used in documentaries or news reports to explain information.

Voice-overs are used in video games and on-hold messages, as well as for announcements and information at events and tourist destinations. It may also be read live for events such as award presentations. Voice-over is added in addition to any existing dialogue and is not to be confused with voice acting or the process of replacing dialogue with a translated version, the latter of which is called dubbing or revoicing.

== History ==
The voice-over industry has evolved significantly since its inception, paralleling developments in technology, entertainment, and advertising. It began in the early days of radio and has since expanded into various media including television, film, video games, and the internet.

=== Early Beginnings (1920s-1930s) ===
Voice-over work began in the 1920s with the advent of radio broadcasting. The industry was primarily driven by radio dramas, comedies, and serials. Actors like Orson Welles were among the pioneers, known for their work on radio shows such as "The Mercury Theatre on the Air." The most notable event of this era was the 1938 broadcast of "The War of the Worlds," directed and narrated by Welles, which famously caused panic among listeners who believed the fictional story to be a real news broadcast.

=== The Golden Age of Radio and the Introduction of Television (1940s-1950s) ===
The 1940s and 1950s are often referred to as the Golden Age of Radio. Voice actors like Mel Blanc, known for his work with Warner Bros. cartoons, became household names. This era also saw the transition from radio to television. Voice-over work expanded to include off-screen narration and character voices in television shows, particularly in animations and commercials.

=== The Rise of Commercials and Dubbing (1960s-1970s) ===
The 1960s and 1970s witnessed a significant increase in the use of voice-overs in commercials. Advertisers began to realize the impact of a strong, persuasive voice in selling products. This period also saw the growth of dubbing foreign films and shows, expanding the global reach of media content.

It was during this time that Don LaFontaine, who would become one of the most famous voices in the industry, began his career after his voice was unexpectedly chosen for a 1964 film's radio ads.

=== Technological Advancements and the Home Video Revolution (1980s-1990s) ===
With the advent of cable television and home video in the 1980s and 1990s, the demand for voice-over artists surged. The era was marked by the rise of animated shows, video games, and the direct-to-video market. Voice actors like James Earl Jones, known for his work as the voice of Darth Vader in "Star Wars," and Frank Welker, known for his work in cartoons and films, became prominent.

=== The Internet Age and the Democratization of Voice-Overs (2000s-Present) ===
The turn of the millennium brought about drastic changes with the proliferation of the internet. Platforms like YouTube and the advent of podcasting opened up new avenues for voice-over work. Home recording technology and high-speed internet made it possible for voice-over artists to work remotely, democratizing the industry. Voice-over websites and online casting services have made it easier for artists to find work and for producers to find talent.

== Career in voice-over ==
To become a voice actor, significant training is required. The important factors to being a voice actor are technique, genres, and work. It is recommended to hire an acting coach and voice coach to help hone skills for recording a voice-over. There are many pieces of equipment that are also required to start a career in voice-overs. A computer, professional microphone, and an editing program, along with a studio to set up in, are all requirements to develop a professional voice-over. Careers in voice-over often allow people to work at home.

To audition for a voice-over role, people often record a demo-reel, which is a compilation of someone's work in voice acting. A demo reel is important to have for someone looking for a job in voice acting because many auditions ask for one. To find casting auditions, there are many online websites that can allow people to sign up for auditions. For an audition, people should study the target audience, warm up and try to arrive early so they can prepare and have the best chance at getting the role. The audition begins with slating. Slating is a practice where the person going for the audition states their name and then says Take 1, Take 2, Take 3. After slating, the auditionee then reads the copy given to them by the casting team.

== Techniques ==
=== Character device ===
In Moby Dick (1956), Ishmael (Richard Basehart) narrates the story, and he sometimes comments on the action in voice-over, as does Joe Gillis (William Holden) in Sunset Boulevard (1950) and Eric Erickson (William Holden) in The Counterfeit Traitor (1962); Adult Pip (John Mills) in Great Expectations (1946) and Michael York in its 1974 television remake.

Voice-over technique is likewise used to give voices and personalities to animated characters. Noteworthy and versatile voice actors include Mel Blanc, Daws Butler, Don Messick, Paul Frees, and June Foray. Characterizing techniques in voice-overs are used to give personalities and voice to fictional characters. There has been some controversy with charactering techniques in voice-overs, particularly with white radio entertainers mimicking AAVE.

In the late 1920s, radio started to stray away from reporting exclusively on musicals and sporting events; instead, radio began to create serial talk shows as well as shows with fictional storylines. Radio became the ideal medium for voice impersonations.

=== Creative device ===
In film, the filmmaker distributes the sound of a human voice (or voices) over images shown on the screen that may or may not be related to the words that are being spoken. Consequently, voice-overs are sometimes used to create ironic counterpoint. Also, sometimes they can be random voices not directly connected to the people seen on the screen. In works of fiction, the voice-over is often by a character reflecting on his or her past, or by a person external to the story who usually has a more complete knowledge of the events in the film than the other characters.

Voice-overs are often used to create the effect of storytelling by a character/omniscient narrator. For example, in The Usual Suspects, the character of Roger "Verbal" Kint has voice-over segments as he is recounting details of a crime. Classic voice-overs in cinema history can be heard in Citizen Kane and The Naked City.

Sometimes, voice-over can be used to aid continuity in edited versions of films, in order for the audience to gain a better understanding of what has gone on between scenes. This was done when the film Joan of Arc (1948) starring Ingrid Bergman turned out to be far from the box-office and critical hit that was expected and it was edited down from 145 minutes to 100 minutes for its second run in theaters. The edited version, which circulated for years, used narration to conceal the fact that large chunks of the film had been cut out. In the full-length version, restored in 1998 and released on DVD in 2004, the voice-over narration is heard only at the beginning of the film.

Film noir is especially associated with the voice-over technique. The golden age of first-person narration was during the 1940s. Film noir typically used male voice-over narration but there are a few rare female voice-overs.

In radio, voice-overs are an integral part of the creation of the radio program. The voice-over artist might be used to entice listeners with the station name or as characters to enhance or develop show content. During the 1980s, the British broadcasters Steve Wright and Kenny Everett used voice-over artists to create a virtual "posse" or studio crew who contributed to the programmes. It is believed that this principle was in play long before that time. The American radio broadcaster Howard Stern has also used voice-overs in this way.

=== Educational or descriptive device ===
The voice-over has many applications in non-fiction as well. Television news is often presented as a series of video clips of newsworthy events, with voice-over by the reporters describing the significance of the scenes being presented; these are interspersed with straight video of the news anchors describing stories for which video is not shown.

Television networks such as The History Channel and the Discovery Channel make extensive use of voice-overs. On NBC, the television show Starting Over used Sylvia Villagran as the voice-over narrator to tell a story.

Live sports broadcasts are usually shown as extensive voice-overs by sports commentators over video of the sporting event.

Game shows formerly made extensive use of voice-overs to introduce contestants and describe available or awarded prizes, but this technique has diminished as shows have moved toward predominantly cash prizes. The most prolific have included Don Pardo, Johnny Olson, John Harlan, Jay Stewart, Gene Wood and Johnny Gilbert.

Voice-over commentary by a leading critic, historian, or by the production personnel themselves is often a prominent feature of the release of feature films or documentaries on DVDs.

=== Commercial device ===
The commercial use of voice-over in television advertising has been popular since the beginning of radio broadcasting.

In the early years, before effective sound recording and mixing, announcements were produced "live" and at once in a studio with the entire cast, crew and, usually, orchestra. A corporate sponsor hired a producer, who hired writers and voice actors to perform comedy or drama.

Manufacturers will often use a distinctive voice to help them with brand messaging, often retaining talent to a long-term exclusive contract.

The industry expanded very rapidly with the advent of television in the 1950s, and the age of highly produced serial radio shows ended. The ability to record high-quality sound on magnetic tape also created opportunities. Digital recording, thanks to the proliferation of PCs, smartphones (iOS and Android 5.0+), dedicated recording devices, free or inexpensive recording and editing software, and USB microphones of reasonable quality, and the increasing use of home studios, has revolutionized the industry.

The sound recording industry uses the term "presence" as the standard of a good quality voice-over and is used for commercial purposes in particular. The term "presence" measures the legitimacy of how a voice sounds, specifically one of a voice-over. Advances in technology for sound recording have helped voice-overs reach that standard. These technological advances have increasingly diminished "the noise of the system...and thus reducing the distance perceived between the object and its representation."

== See also ==
- Voice-over translation
- Bumper (broadcasting)
- Bumper music
- Cinéma vérité
- Direct cinema
- I Know That Voice
- National Audio Theatre Festival
- Offscreen
- Voice acting
