= Oneword =

British commercial digital radio station

United Kingdom
- Frequencies: DAB: 11D (Digital One); Freeview: 717; Sky Digital: 0127

Programming
- Format: Speech

Ownership
- Owner: UBC Media Group

History
- First air date: 2 May 2000; 25 years ago
- Last air date: 11 January 2008; 18 years ago

Links
- Website: www.oneword.co.uk

Oneword Radio was a British commercial digital radio station featuring books, drama, comedy, children's programming, and discussion. The station was available in the UK via digital radio (DAB) and digital television (Freeview DVB-T and Sky Digital DVB-S) and was streamed on the internet 24 hours a day worldwide. It was launched on 2 May 2000.

Ownership was shared between UBC Media Group and Channel 4 between early 2005 and December 2007. In October 2005, Channel 4 increased its stake to a majority by buying 51% of Oneword for £1 million. At 7.30 on weekday mornings, Oneword carried the Channel 4 Radio daily news broadcast The Morning Report, which was produced by the Channel 4 news team.

Virgin Media removed OneWord from its ex-NTL cable channel lineup on 4 October 2007. Oneword was not on its ex-Telewest lineup at the time.

In December 2007, Channel 4 decided to withdraw its funding, selling its share back to UBC Media Group for £1. All programming was replaced by repeats of previous output. On 1 January 2008 the remaining staff were dismissed. Oneword ceased broadcasting on DAB on Friday 11 January 2008.

After broadcasting ended, birdsong was broadcast on the channel until a permanent replacement, Amazing Radio, came on air on 1 June 2009.
