= 2000X =

- Logo
- Genre: Science fiction
- Country of origin: USA
- Language: English
- Home station: NPR
- Original release: 2 April – 26 September 2000
- No. of episodes: 26

2000X is a dramatic anthology series released by National Public Radio and produced by the Hollywood Theater of the Ear. There were 49 plays of various lengths in 26 one-hour programs, broadcast weekly and later released on the Internet. Plays were adaptations of futuristic stories, novels and plays by noted authors. Producer/director Yuri Rasovsky and Harlan Ellison won the 2001 Bradbury Award from the Science Fiction Writers of America for their work on this program. Ellison acted as host and consultant, and co-adapted his short story "'Repent, Harlequin!' Said the Ticktockman".

== Plays in the series ==
Program number	Title	Air date	Author
1a	"Merchant"	2000 04 02r	Henry Slesar
1b	"By His Bootstraps"	2000 04 02	Robert A. Heinlein
2	"Vaster Than Empires and More Slow"	2000 04 09	Ursula K. Le Guin
3a	"Collector's Fever"	2000 04 16	Roger Zelazny
3b	"Knock"	2000 04 16	Fredric Brown
3c	"Even the Queen"	2000 04 16	Connie Willis
4	"The Mission of the Vega"	2000 04 23	Friedrich Dürrenmatt
5a	"And Miles to Go Before I Sleep"	2000 04 30	William F. Nolan
5b	"The Machine Stops"	2000 04 30	E. M. Forster
6a	"Revival Meeting"	2000 05 07	Dannie Plachta
6b	"Dear Pen Pal"	2000 05 07	A. E. van Vogt
6c	"A Learned Fable"	2000 05 07	Mark Twain
07a	"Why Support for Public Radio Must Increase in the New Century"	2000 05 16	Yuri Rasovsky
7b	"Pillar of Fire"	2000 05 16	Ray Bradbury
8	"R.U.R."	2000 05 21	Karel Čapek
9a	"Sentience Today"	2000 05 28	Gort Klatu
9b	"A Sleep and a Forgetting"	2000 05 28	Robert Silverberg
10a	"The Survey"	2000 06 04	Yuri Rasovsky
10b	"A Dream of Armageddon"	2000 06 04	H. G. Wells
11a	"Watchbird"	2000 06 13	Robert Sheckley
11b	"A Curious Fragment"	2000 06 13	Jack London
12	"As Easy as ABC"	2000 06 18	Rudyard Kipling
13	"Hunting Season"	2000 06 27	Frank M. Robinson
14a	"Millennium Bug"	2000 07 02	Yuri Rasovsky (as Ytzhak Berle)
14b	"In a Thousand Years"	2000 07 02	Hans Christian Andersen
14c	"In the Year 2889"	2000 07 02	Jules Verne
14d	"Millennium Bug II"	2000 07 02	Yuri Rasovsky (as Ytzhak Berle)
15	"The Thing Happens"	2000 07 09	George Bernard Shaw
16a	"It Came from Outer Pinsk"	2000 07 16	Yuri Rasovsky
16b	"The Proud Robot"	2000 07 16	Henry Kuttner (as Lewis Padgett)
17a	"'Repent, Harlequin!' Said the Ticktockman"	2000 07 23	Harlan Ellison
17b	"By the Waters of Babylon"	2000 07 23	Stephen Vincent Benét
18	"All for Love"	2000 07 30	John Dryden
19a	"The Only Bird in Her Name"	2000 08 07	Terry Dowling
19b	"Tomorrow and Tomorrow and Tomorrow"	2000 08 07	Kurt Vonnegut
20	"The Marching Morons"	2000 08 14	C. M. Kornbluth
21a	"Bloodchild"	2000 08 22	Octavia Butler
21b	"Shambleau"	2000 08 22	C. L. Moore
22	"The Mad Planet"	2000 08 29	Murray Leinster
23	"Hurricane Trio"	2000 09 05	Theodore Sturgeon
24	"The Moon Maid"	2000 09 12	Edgar Rice Burroughs
25	"Ole Doc Methuselah"	2000 09 19	L. Ron Hubbard
26a	"Blood"	2000 09 26	Fredric Brown
26b	"A Little Bank Deposit"	2000 09 26	Gerald Kersh
26c	"A Dialogue for the Year 2130"	2000 09 26	Thomas Henry Lister
26d	"The Choice"	2000 09 26	Wayland Young
