= Radio format =

Overall content broadcast on a radio station

A radio format, programming format (not to be confused with broadcast programming), or specialist station (British English) describes the overall content broadcast on a radio station. The radio format emerged mainly in the United States in the 1950s, at a time when radio was compelled to develop new and exclusive ways to programming by competition with television. The formula has since spread as a reference for commercial radio programming worldwide.

A radio format aims to reach a more or less specific audience according to a certain type of programming, which can be thematic or general, more informative or more musical, among other possibilities. (Note: Music radio, old time radio, all-news radio, sports radio, talk radio and weather radio describe the operation of different genres of radio format and each format can often be sub-divided into many specialty formats.) Radio formats are often used as a marketing tool and are subject to frequent changes, including temporary changes called "stunting."

Except for talk radio or sports radio formats, most programming formats are based on commercial music. However the term also includes the news, bulletins, DJ talk, jingles, commercials, competitions, traffic news, sports, weather and community announcements between the tracks.

== Background ==
Even before World War II, radio stations in North America and Europe almost always adopted a generalist radio format.

However, the United States witnessed the growing strengthening of television over the radio as the major mass media in the country by the late 1940s. American television had more financial resources to produce generalist programs that provoked the migration of countless talents from radio networks to the new medium. Under this context, the radio was pressured to seek alternatives to maintain its audience and cultural relevance.

As a consequence, AM radios stations—many of which were "independent", that is not affiliated with the network—began to emerge in the United States and Canada. They developed a format with programming consisting of music, news, and charismatic disc jockeys to directly attract a certain audience.

For example, by the 1960s, easy listening obtained a stable position on FM radio – a spectrum considered ideal for good music and high fidelity listening as it grew in popularity during that period (Note: At that time, there were several American FM stations that belonged to owners of AM stations, so the programming of the AM station was broadcast simultaneously with the station FM. Owners who programmed FM stations independently often did so using avant-garde, underground, jazz or highbrow (generally, classical music) program formats as a form to attract the few listeners who owned FM receivers and who were specific about signal quality they heard.) – and the middle of the road (MOR) rose as a radio industry term to discern radio stations that played mainstream pop songs from radio stations whose programming was geared towards teenagers and was dominated by rock and roll, the most popular musical genre of the period in the United States and which held the first successful radio format called Top-40. In reality, the Top-40 format was conscientiously prepared to attract the young audience, who was the main consumer of the records sold by the American record industry at that time. Soon, playlists became central to programming and radio formats, although the number of records in a playlist really depends on the format. (Note: The figure 40 was established by Todd Storz and Bill Stewart n their station KOWH-AM in Omaha, Nebraska, inspired by the fact that there were 40 records in a bar jukebox. In the 1960s, some radio formats reduced the figure to 30 records, or even just 10.)

By the mid-1960s, American FM radio's perception began achieving balance with AM radio since the Federal Communications Commission required that co-owned AM and FM stations be programmed independently from each other. This resulted in huge competition between radio stations in the AM and FM spectrum to differentiate themselves for both audiences and advertisers. At that time, it caused a proliferation of many radio formats, which included presentation, schedule and target audience, as well as repertoire. Within a few years, FM radio stations were supplying program formats completely analogous to their AM stations counterparts, increased to more than 50% in 1970 and reached 95% in 1980.

During the 1970s and 1980s, radio programming formats expanded into commercially successful variations, including, for example, adult contemporary (AC), album-oriented rock (AOR) and urban contemporary (UC), among others, which spread to most AM and FM radio stations in the United States.

Over time, FM radio came to dominate music programming, while AM radio switched to news and talk formats.

== Regulation ==
In some countries such as the UK, licences to broadcast on radio frequencies are regulated by the government, and may take account of social and cultural factors including format type, local content, and language, as well as the price available to pay for the spectrum use. This may be done to ensure a balance of available public content in each area, and in particular to enable non-profit local community radio to exist alongside larger and richer national companies. On occasions format regulation may lead to difficult legal challenges when government accuses a station of changing its format, for example arguing in court over whether a particular song or group of songs is "pop" or "rock".

== List of radio formats ==
=== North America (United States and Canada) ===
Formats constantly evolve and each format can often be sub-divided into many specialty formats. Some of the following formats are available only regionally or through specialized venues such as satellite radio or Internet radio.

Pop

- Contemporary hit radio (CHR), occasionally still informally known as top-40 / hot hits)
- Adult contemporary music (AC)
- Rhythmic adult contemporary
- Rhythmic contemporary (Rhythmic Top 40)
- Rhythmic oldies
- Adult/variety hits – Broad variety of pop hits spanning multiple eras and formats; Jack FM, Bob FM.
- Classic hits and Oldies – Pop/Rock music that came between the 1950s and 2010s
- Hot adult contemporary (Hot AC)
- Modern adult contemporary (Modern AC)
- Soft adult contemporary (soft AC)

Rock

- Active rock
- Adult album alternative (or just adult alternative) (AAA or Triple-A)
- Album rock / album-oriented rock (AOR)
- Alternative rock
- Classic alternative
- Classic rock
- Mainstream rock
- Modern rock
- Progressive rock
- Psychedelic rock
- Soft rock

Country

- Americana
- Bluegrass
- Country music:
  - Classic country (exclusively older-released music)
  - New country/Young country/Hot country (top 40 country with some non-country pop and no older music)
  - Mainstream country (top 40 country with some older-released music)
  - Traditional country (mix of old and new-released music)
- Regional country formats: Cajun (Bayou), Texas, New Mexico, Oklahoma Red Dirt, Gulf and Western (Florida), Newfoundland

Urban

- Classic hip-hop
- Quiet storm (most often a "daypart" late night format at urban and urban AC stations, i.e. 7 p.m.–12 midnight)
- Urban:
  - Urban contemporary (mostly rap, hip hop, soul, and contemporary R&B artists)
  - Urban adult contemporary (Urban AC) – R&B (both released newer and older), soul and sometimes gospel music, without hip hop and rap
  - Urban oldies (sometimes called "classic soul", "R&B oldies", or "old school")
- Soul music

Dance/Electronic

- Dance (dance top-40)
- Space music
- Carolina beach music (regional in the Carolinas; mostly R&B and some pop-country with shuffle beat)

Jazz/Blues/Standards

- Big band
- Blues
- Jazz
- Smooth jazz
- Traditional pop

Easy Listening/New Age

- Adult standards / nostalgia (pre-rock)
- Beautiful music
- Easy listening
- Middle of the road (MOR)

Folk

- Folk music

Latin

- Spanish-language rhythmic
- Ranchera
- Regional Mexican (Banda, mariachi, norteño, etc.)
- Rock en Español
- Romántica (Spanish-language AC)
- Spanish-language sub-formats:
  - Tejano music (Texas/Mexican music)
  - Also see: Ranchera, Regional Mexican, Romántica, and Tropical
- Tropical (salsa, merengue, cumbia, etc.)
- Urbano (reggaetón, Latin rap, etc.)

Multicultural

- Caribbean (reggae, soca, merengue, cumbia, salsa, etc.)
- Desi music
- Asian pop
  - Japanese music (J-pop, J-rock, Anisong, city pop, etc.)
  - Korean music (K-pop, K-rock, etc.)
  - Traditional Philippine music
- Polka
- Tribal/Native
- World music

Faith-based

- Christian music
  - Contemporary Christian music (CCM)
  - Christian adult contemporary
  - Christian CHR
  - Contemporary worship music
  - Urban contemporary gospel
  - Southern Gospel
  - Traditional hymns (e.g. Bible Broadcasting Network, Fundamental Broadcasting Network)

Classical

- Classical
- Contemporary classical music

Seasonal/holiday/events

Seasonal formats typically celebrate a particular holiday and thus, with the notable exception of Christmas music (which is usually played throughout Advent), stations going to a holiday-themed format usually only do so for a short time, typically a day or a weekend.

- Christmas music radio (usually seasonal, mainly late November into December)
- American patriotic music (short-term format, usually adopted around holidays such as Fourth of July and Memorial Day)
  - In Canada, the equivalent of this is an all-CanCon format for Canada Day or Victoria Day
- Halloween music (usually only on or around 31 October)
- Irish folk music (usually only on or around 17 March to celebrate Saint Patrick's Day)
- Summer music (June to August in the Northern Hemisphere)

Miscellanies

- Eclectic
- Freeform radio (DJ-selected)

Spoken word formats

- All-news radio
- Children's
- Christian radio
- Campus radio
- Comedy radio
- Educational
- Ethnic/International
- Freeform/Experimental
- Full-service (talk and variety music)
- Old time radio
- Paranormal radio shows
- Radio audiobooks (see also radio reading service)
- Radio documentary
- Radio drama
  - Radio soap operas
- Religious radio
- Sports (Sports talk)
- News/Talk
  - Conservative talk radio
  - Progressive talk radio
  - Public talk radio
  - Hot talk/shock jocks
- Weather radio

=== United Kingdom ===
Music-oriented

The UK has several formats that often overlap with one another. The American terms for formats are not always used to describe British stations or fully set specified by RAJAR.

- Contemporary hit radio (CHR) / Top 40 - e.g. Capital, BBC Radio 1, Hits Radio
  - Rhythmic contemporary (Rhythmic CHR) - e.g. Kiss, Capital Xtra
- Adult contemporary music (AC) – e.g. BBC Radio 2, Magic
  - Hot adult contemporary (hot AC), middle ground between CHR and soft AC – e.g. Heart, Virgin Radio
  - Modern adult contemporary (modern AC) with stronger leaning to rock – e.g. Absolute Radio
  - Soft adult contemporary (soft AC) – e.g. Smooth Radio
  - Urban/black adult contemporary with stronger leaning to urban and hip-hop – e.g. BBC Radio 1Xtra
- Oldies, which can range from the 1950s to the 2000s depending on the station – e.g. Gold, Greatest Hits Radio, Kisstory, Absolute 80s
- Alternative, sometimes confused with rock – e.g. Radio X, BBC Radio 6 Music
- Classical – e.g. Classic FM, BBC Radio 3
- Asian, referring to content for British Asian communities (including Indian, Pakistani, Sri Lankan, Bangladeshi, Afghan, Nepalese) – e.g. BBC Asian Network, Sunrise Radio
- Ethnic, referring to content for specific ethnic communities – e.g. London Greek Radio, Spectrum Radio
- Community, radio stations for localised communities which can be in various formats including ethnic

Spoken-words

- News and talk – e.g. LBC, BBC Radio 5 Live, Times Radio
  - Sports broadcasting and talk – e.g. BBC Radio 5 Live, Talksport
- News, talk, documentaries and drama – e.g. BBC Radio 4
- Christian, broadcasts for Christian religious interests with occasional music – e.g. Premier Christian Radio

== See also ==
- Radio broadcasting
- Radio personality
- Television format
- Top 40
