= Not from Space =

Not From Space is a feature-length radio drama first broadcast on XM Satellite Radio (now SiriusXM) in 2003. It was the first radio program of its kind where voice actors exchanged their recorded lines remotely via the Internet rather than on-site in a traditional studio. In 2015, a feature film adaptation was announced and a trailer for it was later published in 2019. A remake of the program was created for its 20th anniversary in 2023, which was broadcast on SiriusXM and later published to music streaming platforms.

== Plot ==
A fictional Bill Gates rivals a media mogul, both dreaming of controlling mankind by means of telepathy. Inhabitants of Earth and Mars both realize they are not alone in the universe.

== Reception ==
The program was awarded with the Silver Mark Time Award for best science-fiction sound film of 2003.

== See also ==
- Radio drama
