= Norman Corwin Presents =

- Genre: Drama anthology
- Written by: Norman Corwin
- Directed by: George McCowan; Herb Roland
- Presented by: Norman Corwin
- Country of origin: Canada
- Original language: English
- No. of seasons: 1
- No. of episodes: 26

Production
- Producer: Arthur Joel Katz
- Running time: 30 minutes
- Production companies: Group W Arjo Productions; Canadian Broadcasting Corporation

Original release
- Network: CBC Television
- Release: 19 June 1972 – 12 September 1973

Norman Corwin Presents is a Canadian drama anthology television series that aired on CBC Television from 1972 to 1973. The series also aired on Group W owned television stations in the US.

== Premise ==
The series host was American broadcast writer Norman Corwin who introduced dramas of various genres and subjects.

== Production ==
The series was a co-production of Group W and Arjo Productions (Arthur Joel Katz). It was recorded in Toronto on videotape.

The series relied on American actors such as Diane Baker, Milton Berle, Beau Bridges, Stan Freberg, Fred Gwynne, Rip Torn and Cicely Tyson. They were supported by Canadian actors such as Gale Garnett, Lynne Gorman, Don Harron, Leslie Nielsen, William Shatner and Donald Sutherland.

== Scheduling ==
This half-hour series was syndicated on American television. In Canada, it was broadcast on CBC Television from 19 June 1972 until 12 September 1973 approximately every week, scheduled on varying evening time slots during its sole season.

== Episodes ==
- "Aunt Dorothy's Playroom", starring Fred Gwynne
- "The Better it is, the Worse it is", starring John Saxon as a married man in an affair with an unmarried woman approximately half his age.
- "Bingo Twice a Week", a drama which portrays an aging woman who is being ejected from her daughter's residence
- "The Blue Hotel"
- "Crown of Rags", starring David McCallum; written by Howard Brown, guest dramatist
- "The D.J.", written by M. Charles Cohen
- "The Discovery"
- "First Big Try", starring Donald Sutherland as narrator of a quasi-documentary about the League of Nations
- "A Foreign Field"
- "Hold That Line"
- "Jefferson's Crush"
- "The Joy of Living"
- "Letter From an Only Child", a psychological drama, starring Gerard Parkes, Maxinne Miller, Diane Baker; Don Balluck, writer
- "A Matter of Life and Death"
- "The Moat Farm Murder", starring James Booth, based on an actual British homicide case
- "Odyssey in Progress"
- "The One Man Group", a comedy concerning a man who becomes possessed by the ghosts of historical figures, starring Donald Harron
- "Pappy's Oasis", starring Beau Bridges, Bonnie Bedelia, a drama about a fugitive
- "Please, No Flowers"
- "The Pursuit", starring David McCallum as an Everyman, who is constantly sought by elements of contemporary society, Arthur Joel Katz director.
- "Reunion"
- "A Soliloquy for Television"
- "A Son, Come Home", starring Georg Stanford Brown; written by Ed Bullins
- "Two Gods on Prime Time", starring Leslie Nielsen, Forrest Tucker, Cicely Tyson in which the mythical Roman deities Mars and Venus are guests on a televised talk show.
- "The Undecided Molecule"
- "You Think You Got Troubles"
