= Radio drama =

Purely acoustic dramatized performance

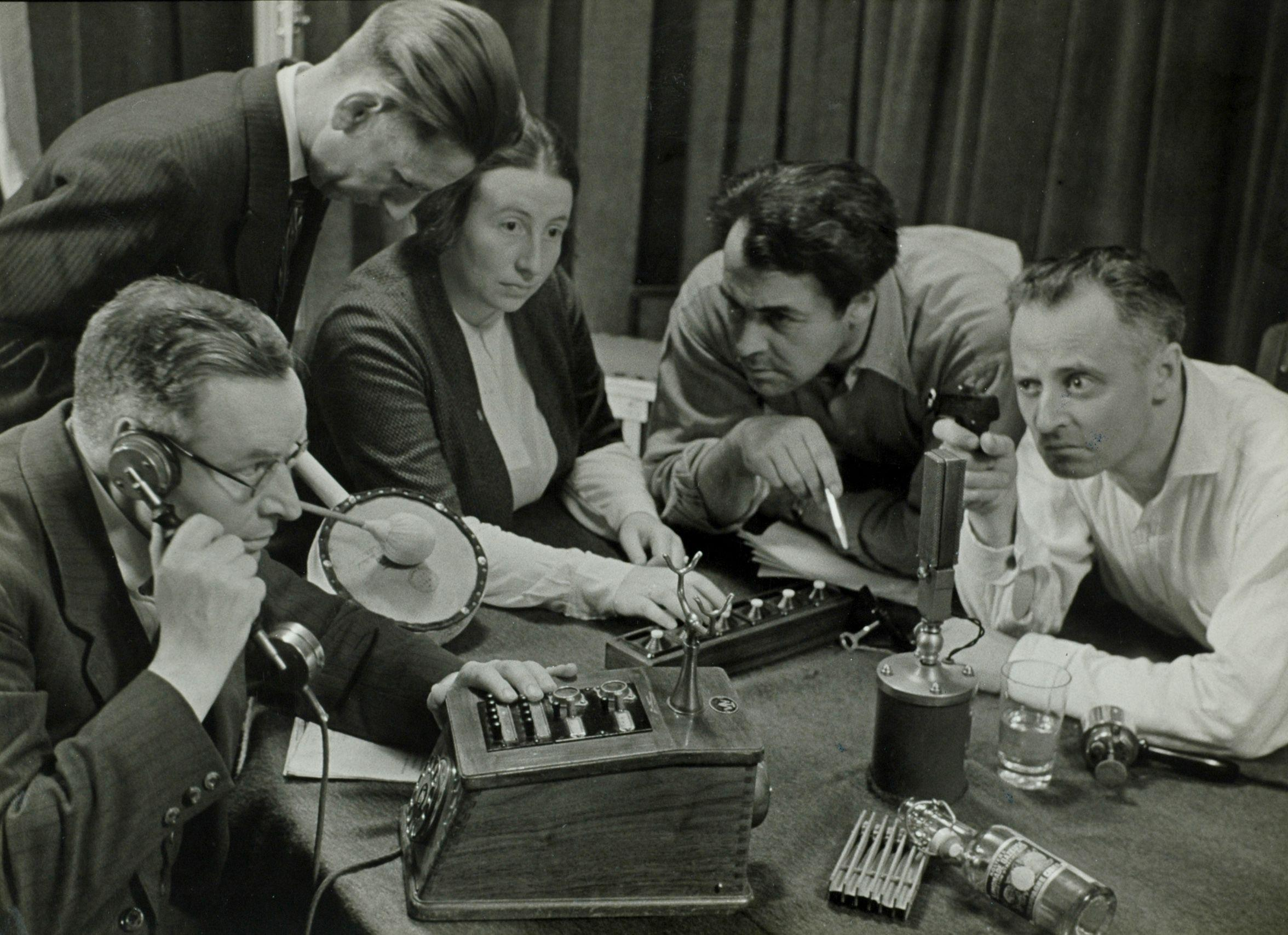
Recording a radio play in the Netherlands (1949)

Radio drama (or audio fiction, audio drama, audio play, radio play, radio theatre, or audio theatre) is a dramatised, purely acoustic performance. With no visual component, radio drama depends on dialogue, music and sound effects to help the listener imagine the characters and story: "It is auditory in the physical dimension but equally powerful as a visual force in the psychological dimension." Radio drama includes plays specifically written for radio, docudrama, dramatised works of fiction, as well as plays originally written for the theatre, including musical theatre, and opera.

Radio drama achieved widespread popularity within a decade of its initial development in the 1920s. By the 1940s, it was a leading international popular entertainment format. With the advent of television in the 1950s, radio drama began losing its audience. However, it remains popular in much of the world.

Recordings of OTR (old-time radio) survive today in the audio archives of collectors, libraries and museums, as well as several online sites such as the Internet Archive.

By the 21st century, radio drama had a minimal presence on terrestrial radio in the United States, with much American radio drama being restricted to rebroadcasts of programmes from previous decades. However, other nations still have thriving traditions of radio drama. In the United Kingdom, for example, the BBC produces and broadcasts hundreds of new radio plays each year on Radio 3, Radio 4, and Radio 4 Extra. Like the US, Australia's network the ABC has abandoned broadcasting drama but in New Zealand on RNZ, continues to promote and broadcast a variety of drama over its airwaves.

Thanks to advances in digital recording and Internet distribution, radio drama experienced a revival around 2010. Podcasting offered the means of inexpensively creating new radio dramas, in addition to the distribution of vintage programs.

The terms audio drama or audio theatre are sometimes used synonymously with radio drama; however, audio drama or audio theatre may not necessarily be intended specifically for broadcast on radio. Audio drama can also be found on CDs, cassette tapes, podcasts, webcasts, or other digital downloads as well as broadcast radio.

== History ==
The Roman playwright Seneca has claim as a forerunner of radio drama because "his plays were performed by readers as sound plays, not by actors as stage plays... In this respect Seneca had no significant successors until 20th-century technology made possible the widespread dissemination of sound plays."

=== 1880–1930: early years ===
English-language radio drama seems to have started in the United States. A Rural Line on Education, a brief sketch specifically written for radio, aired on Pittsburgh's KDKA in 1921, according to historian Bill Jaker. Newspaper accounts of the era report on a number of other drama experiments by America's commercial radio stations: KYW broadcast a season of complete operas from Chicago starting in November 1921. In February 1922, entire Broadway musical comedies with the original casts aired from WJZ's Newark studios. Actors Grace George and Herbert Hayes performed an entire play from a San Francisco station in the summer of 1922.

An important turning point in radio drama came when Schenectady, New York's WGY, after a successful tryout on 3 August 1922, began weekly studio broadcasts of full-length stage plays in September 1922, using music, sound effects and a regular troupe of actors, The WGY Players. Aware of this series, the director of Cincinnati's WLW began regularly broadcasting one-acts (as well as excerpts from longer works) in November. The success of these projects led to imitators at other stations. By early 1923, original dramatic pieces written specially for radio were airing on stations in Cincinnati (When Love Wakens by WLW's Fred Smith), Philadelphia (The Secret Wave by Clyde A. Criswell) and Los Angeles (At Home over KHJ). That same year, WLW (in May) and WGY (in September) sponsored scripting contests, inviting listeners to create original plays to be performed by those stations' dramatic troupes.

Listings in The New York Times and other sources for May 1923 reveal at least 20 dramatic offerings were scheduled (including one-acts, excerpts from longer dramas, complete three- and four-act plays, operettas and a Molière adaptation), either as in-studio productions or by remote broadcast from local theatres and opera houses. An early British drama broadcast was of Shakespeare's A Midsummer Night's Dream on 2LO on 25 July 1923.

Serious study of American radio drama of the 1920s and early 1930s is, at best, very limited. Unsung pioneers of the art include: WLW's Fred Smith; Freeman Gosden and Charles Correll (who popularised the dramatic serial); The Eveready Hour creative team (which began with one-act plays but was soon experimenting with hour-long combinations of drama and music on its weekly variety program); the various acting troupes at stations like WLW, WGY, KGO and a number of others, frequently run by women like Helen Schuster Martin and Wilda Wilson Church; early network continuity writers like Henry Fisk Carlton, William Ford Manley and Don Clark; producers and directors like Clarence Menser and Gerald Stopp; and a long list of others who were credited at the time with any number of innovations but who are largely forgotten or undiscussed today. Elizabeth McLeod's 2005 book on Gosden and Correll's early work is a major exception, as is Richard J. Hand's 2006 study of horror radio, which examines some programs from the late 1920s and early 1930s.

Another notable early radio drama, one of the first specially written for the medium in the UK, was A Comedy of Danger by Richard Hughes, broadcast by the BBC on 15 January 1924, about a group of people trapped in a Welsh coal mine. One of the earliest and most influential French radio plays was the prize-winning Marémoto ('Seaquake'), by Gabriel Germinet and Pierre Cusy, which presents a realistic account of a sinking ship before revealing that the characters are actually actors rehearsing for a broadcast. Translated and broadcast in Germany and England by 1925, the play was originally scheduled by Radio-Paris to air on 23 October 1924, but was instead banned from French radio until 1937 because the government feared that the dramatic SOS messages would be mistaken for genuine distress signals.

In 1951, American writer and producer Arch Oboler suggested that Wyllis Cooper's Lights Out (1934–47) was the first true radio drama to make use of the unique qualities of radio:

Radio drama (as distinguished from theatre plays boiled down to kilocycle size) began at midnight, in the middle thirties, on one of the upper floors of Chicago's Merchandise Mart. The pappy was a rotund writer by the name of Wyllis Cooper.

Though the series is often remembered solely for its gruesome stories and sound effects, Cooper's scripts for Lights Out were later recognised as well written and offered innovations seldom heard in early radio dramas, including multiple first-person narrators, stream of consciousness monologues and scripts that contrasted a duplicitous character's internal monologue and his spoken words.

The question of who was the first to write stream-of-consciousness drama for radio is a difficult one to answer. By 1930, Tyrone Guthrie had written plays for the BBC like Matrimonial News (which consists entirely of the thoughts of a shopgirl awaiting a blind date) and The Flowers Are Not for You to Pick (which takes place inside the mind of a drowning man). After they were published in 1931, Guthrie's plays aired on the American networks. Around the same time, Guthrie himself also worked for the Canadian National Railway radio network, producing plays written by Merrill Denison that used similar techniques. A 1940 article in Variety credited a 1932 NBC play, Drink Deep by Don Johnson, as the first stream-of-consciousness play written for American radio. The climax of Lawrence Holcomb's 1931 NBC play Skyscraper also uses a variation of the technique (so that the listener can hear the final thoughts and relived memories of a man falling to his death from the title building).

There were probably earlier examples of stream-of-consciousness drama on the radio. For example, in December 1924, actor Paul Robeson, then appearing in a revival of Eugene O'Neill's The Emperor Jones, performed a scene from the play over New York's WGBS to critical acclaim. Some of the many storytellers and monologuists on early 1920s American radio might be able to claim even earlier dates.

=== 1930–1960s: widespread popularity ===
Perhaps America's most famous radio drama broadcast is Orson Welles' The War of the Worlds (a 1938 version of H. G. Wells' novel), which inspired stories of a mass panic that, though greatly exaggerated, signaled the power of the form. By the late 1930s, radio drama was widely popular in the United States (and also in other parts of the world). There were dozens of programs in many different genres, from mysteries and thrillers, to soap operas and comedies. Among American playwrights, screenwriters and novelists who got their start in radio drama are Rod Serling and Irwin Shaw.

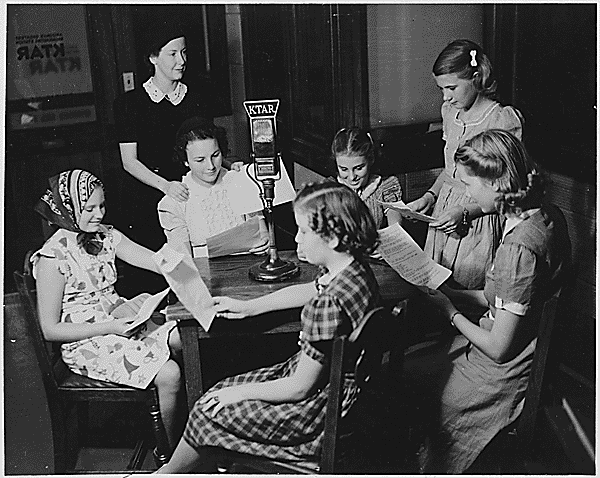
Radio program written and performed in Phoenix, Arizona by children of Junior Artists Club (Federal Arts Program, 1935).

In Britain, however, during the 1930s BBC programming, tended to be more high brow, including the works of Shakespeare, Classical Greek drama, as well as the works of major modern playwrights, such as Chekhov, Ibsen, Strindberg, and so forth. Novels and short stories were also frequently dramatised. In addition the plays of contemporary writers and original plays were produced, with, for example, a broadcast of T. S. Eliot's famous verse play Murder in the Cathedral in 1936. By 1930, the BBC was producing "twice as many plays as London's West End" and were producing over 400 plays a year by the mid-1940s.

Producers of radio drama soon became aware that adapting stage plays for radio did not always work, and that there was a need for plays specifically written for radio, which recognised its potential as a distinct and different medium from the theatre. George Bernard Shaw's plays, for example, were seen as readily adaptable. However, in a lead article in the BBC literary journal The Listener, of 14 August 1929, which discussed the broadcasting of 12 great plays, it was suggested that while the theatrical literature of the past should not be neglected the future lay mainly with plays written specifically for the microphone.

In 1939–40, the BBC founded its own Drama Repertory Company which made a stock of actors readily available. After the war, the number was around 50. They performed in the great number of plays broadcast in the heyday of BBC radio drama of the 40s–60s.

Initially the BBC resisted American-style 'soap opera', but eventually highly popular serials, like Dick Barton, Special Agent (1946–51), Mrs Dale's Diary (1948–69) and The Archers (1950–), were produced. The Archers is still running (as of July 2024) and is the world's longest-running soap opera with a total of over 18,400 episodes. There had been some earlier serialised drama including, the six episode The Shadow of the Swastika (1939), Dorothy L. Sayers's The Man Born To Be King, in twelve episodes (1941), and Front Line Family (1941–48), which was broadcast to America as part of the effort to encourage the US to enter the war. The show's storylines depicted the trials and tribulations of a British family, the Robinsons, living through the war. This featured plots about rationing, family members missing in action and the Blitz. After the war in 1946 it was moved to the BBC Light Programme.

The BBC continued producing various kinds of drama, including docu-drama, throughout World War II; amongst the writers they employed were the novelist James Hanley and poet Louis MacNeice, who in 1941 became an employee of the BBC's. MacNeice's work for the BBC initially involved writing and producing radio programmes intended to build support for the US, and later Russia, through cultural programmes emphasising links between the countries rather than outright propaganda. By the end of the war MacNeice had written well over 60 scripts for the BBC, including Christopher Columbus (1942), which starred Laurence Olivier, The Dark Tower (1946), and a six-part radio adaptation of Goethe's Faust (1949).

Following World War II the BBC reorganised its radio provision, introducing two new channels to supplement the BBC Home Service (itself the result of the fusion in September 1939 of the pre-war National and Regional Programmes). These were the BBC Light Programme (dating from 29 July 1945 and a direct successor to the wartime General Forces Programme) and the BBC Third Programme (launched on 29 September 1946).

The BBC Light Programme, while principally devoted to light entertainment and music, carried a fair share of drama, both single plays (generally, as the name of the station indicated, of a lighter nature) and serials. In contrast, the BBC Third Programme, destined to become one of the leading cultural and intellectual forces in post-war Britain, specialised in heavier drama (as well as the serious music, talks, and other features which made up its content): long-form productions of both classical and modern/experimental dramatic works sometimes occupied the major part of its output on any given evening. The Home Service, meanwhile, continued to broadcast more "middle-brow" drama (one-off plays and serialisations) daily.

The high-water mark for BBC radio drama was the 1950s and 1960s, and during this period many major British playwrights either effectively began their careers with the BBC, or had works adapted for radio. Most of playwright Caryl Churchill's early experiences with professional drama production were as a radio playwright and, starting in 1962 with The Ants, she wrote nine productions with BBC radio drama up until 1973, when her stage work began to be recognised at the Royal Court Theatre. Joe Orton's dramatic debut in 1963 was the radio play The Ruffian on the Stair, which was broadcast on 31 August 1964.

Tom Stoppard's "first professional production was in the 15-minute Just Before Midnight programme on BBC Radio, which showcased new dramatists". John Mortimer made his radio debut as a dramatist in 1955, with his adaptation of his own novel Like Men Betrayed for the BBC Light Programme. However, he made his debut as an original playwright with The Dock Brief, starring Michael Hordern as a hapless barrister, first broadcast in 1957 on BBC Third Programme, later televised with the same cast and subsequently presented in a double bill with What Shall We Tell Caroline? at the Lyric Hammersmith in April 1958, before transferring to the Garrick Theatre. Mortimer is most famous for Rumpole of the Bailey, a British television series which starred Leo McKern as Horace Rumpole, an aging London barrister who defends any and all clients. It has been spun off into a series of short stories, novels, and radio programmes.

Giles Cooper was a pioneer in writing for radio, becoming prolific in both radio and television drama. His early successes included radio dramatisations of Charles Dickens's Oliver Twist, William Golding's Lord of the Flies, and John Wyndham's classic science fiction novel The Day of the Triffids. He was also successful in the theatre. The first of his radio plays to make his reputation was Mathry Beacon (1956), about a small detachment of men and women still guarding a Top Secret "missile deflector" somewhere in Wales, years after the war has ended. Bill Naughton's radio play Alfie Elkins and his Little Life (1962) was first broadcast on the BBC Third Programme on 7 January 1962. In it Alfie, "[w]ith sublime amorality... swaggers and philosophises his way through" life. The action spans about two decades, from the beginning of World War II to the late 1950s. In 1964, Bill Naughton turned it into a stage play which was put on at London's Mermaid Theatre. Later, he wrote the screenplay for a film version, Alfie (1966), starring Michael Caine.

Other notable radio dramatists included Henry Reed, Brendan Behan, Rhys Adrian, Alan Plater; Anthony Minghella, Alan Bleasdale, and novelist Angela Carter. Novelist Susan Hill also wrote for BBC Radio, from the early 1970s. Henry Reed was especially successful with the Hilda Tablet plays. Irish playwright Brendan Behan, author of The Quare Fellow (1954), was commissioned by the BBC to write a radio play The Big House (1956); prior to this he had written two plays for Irish radio: Moving Out and A Garden Party.

Among the most famous works created for radio, are Dylan Thomas's Under Milk Wood (1954), Samuel Beckett's All That Fall (1957), Harold Pinter's A Slight Ache (1959), and Robert Bolt's A Man for All Seasons (1954). Beckett wrote a number of short radio plays in the 1950s and 1960s, and later for television; his radio play Embers was first broadcast on the BBC Third Programme on 24 June 1959 and won the RAI prize at the Prix Italia awards later that year.

Robert Bolt's writing career began with scripts for Children's Hour. A Man for All Seasons was subsequently produced on television in 1957. Then in 1960, there was a highly successful stage production in London's West End and on New York's Broadway from late 1961. In addition there have been two film versions: in 1966 starring Paul Scofield and 1988 for television, starring Charlton Heston.

While Alan Ayckbourn did not write for radio many of his stage plays were subsequently adapted for radio. Other significant adaptations included, dramatised readings of poet David Jones's In Parenthesis in 1946 and The Anathemata in 1953, for the BBC Third Programme, and novelist Wyndham Lewis's The Human Age (1955). Among contemporary novels that were dramatised were the 1964 radio adaptation of Stan Barstow's A Kind of Loving (1960); there had also been a 1962 film adaptation.

=== 1960–2000: decline in the United States ===
After the advent of television, radio drama never recovered its popularity in the United States. Most remaining CBS and NBC radio dramas were cancelled in 1960. The last network radio dramas to originate during American radio's "Golden Age", Suspense and Yours Truly, Johnny Dollar, ended on 30 September 1962.

There have been some efforts at radio drama since then. In the 1960s, Dick Orkin created the popular syndicated comic adventure series Chicken Man. ABC Radio aired a daily dramatic anthology program, Theater Five, in 1964–65. Inspired by The Goon Show, "the four or five crazy guys" of the Firesign Theatre built a large following with their satirical plays on recordings exploring the dramatic possibilities inherent in stereo. A brief resurgence of production beginning in the early 1970s yielded Rod Serling's The Zero Hour for Mutual, National Public Radio's Earplay, and veteran Himan Brown's CBS Radio Mystery Theater and General Mills Radio Adventure Theater. These productions were later followed by the Sears/Mutual Radio Theater, The National Radio Theater of Chicago, NPR Playhouse, and a newly produced episode of the former 1950s series X Minus One. Works by a new generation of dramatists also emerged at this time, notably Yuri Rasovsky, Thomas Lopez of ZBS and the dramatic sketches heard on humourist Garrison Keillor's A Prairie Home Companion. Brian Daley's 1981 adaptation of the blockbuster space opera film Star Wars for NPR Playhouse was a notable success. Production costs on this serial were mitigated by the support of Lucasfilm, which sold the rights to NPR for a nominal $1 fee, and by the participation of the BBC in an international co-production deal. Star Wars was credited with generating a 40% rise in NPR's ratings and quadrupling the network's youth audience overnight. Radio adaptations of the sequels followed with The Empire Strikes Back in 1983 and Return of the Jedi in 1996.

Thanks in large part to the National Endowments for the Arts and Humanities, public radio continued to air a smattering of audio drama until the mid-1980s. From 1986 to 2002, NPR's most consistent producer of radio drama was the idiosyncratic Joe Frank, working out of KCRW in Santa Monica. The Sci Fi Channel presented an audio drama series, Seeing Ear Theatre, on its website from 1997 to 2001. Also, the dramatic serial It's Your World aired twice daily on the nationally syndicated Tom Joyner Morning Show from 1994 to 2008, continuing online through 2010.

=== 2000–present: radio drama's "new media" revival ===
Radio drama remains popular in much of the world, though most material is now available through Internet download rather than heard over terrestrial or satellite radio. Stations producing radio drama often commission a large number of scripts. The relatively low cost of producing a radio play enables them to take chances with works by unknown writers. Radio can be a good training ground for beginning drama writers as the words written form a much greater part of the finished product; bad lines cannot be obscured with stagecraft.

The BBC's sole surviving radio soap is The Archers on BBC Radio 4: it is, with over 20,935 episodes to date, the world's longest-running such programme. Other radio soaps ("ongoing serials") produced by the BBC but no longer on air include:

- Mrs Dale's Diary (1948–69)
- Westway on the World Service (1997–2005)
- Silver Street (2004–10) on the Asian Network

In September, 2010 Radio New Zealand began airing its first ongoing soap opera, You Me Now, which won the Best New Drama Award in the 2011 New Zealand Radio Awards.

On KDVS radio in Davis, California there are two radio theatre shows, Evening Shadows, a horror/fantasy show paying tribute to classic old-time radio horror, and KDVS Radio Theater which commonly features dramas about social and political themes.

The audio drama format exists side by side with books presented on radio, read by actors or by the author. In Britain and other countries there is also quite a bit of radio comedy (both stand-up and sitcom). Together, these programs provide entertainment where television is either not wanted or would be distracting (such as while driving or operating machinery). Selected Shorts, a long-running NPR program broadcast in front of a live audience at Symphony Space in New York, originated the driveway moment for over 300,000 people listeners each week during readings of contemporary and classic short stories by well-known professional actors.

The lack of visuals also enable fantastical settings and effects to be used in radio plays where the cost would be prohibitive for movies or television. The Hitchhiker's Guide to the Galaxy was first produced as radio drama, and was not adapted for television until much later, when its popularity would ensure an appropriate return for the high cost of the futuristic setting.

On occasion television series can be revived as radio series. For example, a long-running but no longer popular television series can be continued as a radio series because the reduced production costs make it cost-effective with a much smaller audience. When an organisation owns both television and radio channels, such as the BBC, the fact that no royalties have to be paid makes this even more attractive. Radio revivals can also use actors reprising their television roles even after decades as they still sound roughly the same. Series that have had this treatment include Doctor Who, Dad's Army, Thunderbirds and The Tomorrow People. In 2013 BBC Radio 4 released a radio adaptation of Neverwhere by Neil Gaiman, featuring a cast of well known television and film actors. Neil Gaiman has said he was excited about the radio drama adaptation as it allowed the work to be presented with a greater deal of special effects than was possible on television. In the United States, an adaptation of The Twilight Zone aired to modest success in the 2000s (decade) as a syndicated program.

Regular broadcasts of radio drama in English can be heard on the BBC's Radio 3, Radio 4 and Radio 4 Extra (formerly Radio 7), on RTÉ Radio 1 in Ireland, and RNZ National in New Zealand. The Canadian Broadcasting Corporation produced notable radio plays in Calgary and Toronto in the postwar decades, from which many actors and directors proceeded to international careers, but abolished its radio drama department in the 1970s and finally ceased production of radio dramas in 2012. BBC Radio 4 is today noted for its radio drama, broadcasting hundreds of new, one-off plays each year in such strands as The Afternoon Play, as well as serials and soap operas. Radio 4 Extra broadcasts a variety of radio plays from the BBC's vast archives and a few extended versions of Radio 4 programmes. The British commercial station Oneword, though broadcasting mostly book readings, also transmitted a number of radio plays in instalments before it closed in 2008.

In the United States, contemporary radio drama can be found on broadcasters including ACB radio, produced by the American Council of the Blind; on the Sirius XM Book Radio channel from Sirius XM Satellite Radio (previously Sonic Theater on XM); and occasionally in syndication, as with Jim French's production Imagination Theater. Several community radio stations carry weekly radio drama programs including KBOO, KFAI, WMPG, WLPP-LP and WFHB.

A growing number of religious radio stations air daily or weekly programs usually geared to younger audiences, such as Focus on the Family's Adventures in Odyssey (1,700+ syndicated stations), or Pacific Garden Mission's Unshackled! (1,800 syndicated stations – a long-running radio drama), which is geared to adults. The networks sometime sell transcripts of their shows on cassette tapes or CDs or make the shows available for listening or downloading over the Internet. Transcription recordings of many pre-television shows have been preserved. They are collected, re-recorded onto audio CDs and/or MP3 files and traded by hobbyists today as old-time radio programmes. Meanwhile, veterans such as the late Yuri Rasovsky (The National Radio Theater of Chicago) and Thomas Lopez (ZBS Foundation) have gained new listeners on cassettes, CDs and downloads. In the mid-1980s, the nonprofit L.A. Theatre Works launched its radio series recorded before live audiences. Productions have been broadcast via public radio, while also being marketed on compact discs and via download. Carl Amari's nationally syndicated radio series Hollywood 360 features four old-time radio shows during his four-hour weekly broadcasts. Amari also broadcasts old-time radio shows on The WGN Radio Theatre heard every Saturday night beginning at 22:00 on 720-WGN in Chicago.

In addition to traditional radio broadcasters, modern radio drama (also known as audio theatre, or audio drama), has experienced a revival, with a growing number of independent producers who are able to build an audience through Internet distribution. While there are few academic programs in the United States that offer training in radio drama production, organisations such as the National Audio Theatre Festival teach the craft to new producers.

The digital age has also resulted in recording styles that differ from the studio recordings of radio drama's Golden Age. Not from Space (2003) on XM Satellite Radio was the first national radio play recorded exclusively through the Internet in which the voice actors were all in separate locations. Other producers use portable recording equipment to record actors on location rather than in studios.

Podcasts are a growing distribution format for independent radio drama producers. Podcasts provides an alternative to mainstream television and radio which does not necessarily require a pitching process to be made and distributed (as these aspects of production can be learned by the creator) and which have no restrictions regarding programme length or content.

== Radio drama around the world ==
=== Australia ===
In Australia, as in most other developed countries, from the early years of the medium almost every radio network and station featured drama, serials, and soap operas as staples of their programming; during the so-called "Golden Years" of radio these were hugely popular. Many Australian serials and "soapies" were copies of American originals (e.g., the popular soap Portia Faces Life or the adventure series Superman, which featured future Australian TV star Leonard Teale in the title role), although these were typically locally produced and performed live to air, since the technology of the time did not permit high-quality pre-recording or duplication of programmes for import or export.

In this period radio drama, serials and soap operas provided a fertile training ground and a steady source of employment for many actors, and this was particularly important because at this time the Australian theatre scene was in its infancy and opportunities were very limited. Many who trained in this medium (such as Peter Finch) subsequently became prominent both in Australia and overseas.

It has been noted that the producers of the popular 1960s Gerry Anderson TV series Thunderbirds were greatly impressed by the versatility of UK-based Australian actor Ray Barrett, who voiced many roles in Anderson's TV productions. Thanks to his early experience on Australian live radio (where he often played English and American roles), Barrett was considered better than his English counterparts at providing a convincing transatlantic accent, and he could perform a wide range of character voices; he also impressed the Anderson team with his ability to quickly and easily switch from one voice/accent to another without the sound engineers' having to stop the recording.

The effect of the introduction of television there in the late 1950s had the same devastating effects as it did in the US and many other markets, and by the early 1960s Australian commercial radio had totally abandoned radio drama and related programming (including comedy, soapies, and variety) in favour of music-based formats (such as Top 40) or talk radio ("talkback"), and the once-flourishing Australia radio production industry vanished within a few years. One of the few companies to survive was the Melbourne-based Crawford Productions, which was able to make the successful transition into TV production.

Despite the complete abandonment of drama and related programming by the commercial radio sector, the government-funded Australian Broadcasting Corporation (ABC) maintained a long history of producing radio drama. One of its most famous and popular series was the daily 15-minute afternoon soap opera Blue Hills, which was written for its entire production history by dramatist Gwen Meredith. It featured many well-known Australian actresses and actors, ran continuously for 27 years, from 28 February 1949 to 30 September 1976, with a total of 5,795 episodes broadcast, and was at one time the world's longest-running radio serial. It was preceded by an earlier Meredith serial The Lawsons, which featured many of the same themes and characters and itself ran for 1299 episodes.

In the 1960s and later, the ABC continued to produce many original Australian radio dramas as well as works adapted from other media. In recent years original radio dramas and adapted works were commissioned from local dramatists and produced for the ABC's Radio National network program Airplay, which ran from the late 1990s until early 2013. In late 2012 ABC management imposed budget cuts and axed a number of long-running arts programs, thereby ending the national broadcaster's decades-long history of producing radio drama (as well as its equally long history of providing daily serialised book readings).

=== Cyprus ===
Since around the early sixties the Cyprus Broadcasting Corporation (RIK) features radio plays in the Cypriot Greek dialect. They are called Cypriot (radio drama) sketches and they are mainly about Cyprus's rural life, traditions and customs, its history and its culture, and it continues until today.

Also very popular in Cyprus during the sixties, seventies and early eighties Police drama was very popular. The series "Police Adventures" became associated with the name of Cyprus Broadcasting Corporation (CyBC) radio producer Mikis Nikitas, who was responsible for its production for many years. The *"Police Adventures"* series also attracted the interest of foreign radio stations, as a number of its episodes were sold to Bavarian Radio in 1970, according to information cited in an annual CyBC report.

The oldest part of CyBC's Radio Theater was "Theater by Radio", which was broadcast on Monday evenings, Also broadcasting theatrical plays, mainly by classical Greek and Cypriot playwrights, as well as works by contemporary Cypriot writers selected through an annual competition, along with classic foreign repertoire. This tradition has been in place since 1953, the year RIK was established. The works are written by established writers, but also from new writers through the Writing Contest of Cypriot Sketches issued annually by CyBC (RIK). Currently, Cypriot sketches are broadcast every Sunday and have a mostly comedic character, satirising current events, they also include comedic song parodies. CyBC has also made other types of radio dramas, such as crime stories in the 2010s, which are available online.

=== Finland ===
In Finland radio dramas (in Finnish kuunnelma) by the Finnish national broadcasting company Yleisradio have been popular since 1930s, and have always used well-known theatre or movie actors. The dramas include books converted to audio dramas, versions of popular theatre productions, pulp novels adapted for radio, or drama explicitly written as radio dramas. One of the most well known series was Suomisen perhe (the "Family Suominen") about a middle-class family, it became so popular that later the originally written for radio drama was converted into a movie series. Popular radio drama from other countries, like the BBC radio drama The Men from the Ministry was translated as Knalli ja sateenvarjo ("Bowler hat and umbrella") and became very popular. J. R. R. Tolkien's The Hobbit was converted to multi-part radio drama.

=== Germany ===
The first German radio drama was produced in 1923. Because of the external circumstances in postwar Germany in which most of the theatres were destroyed, radio drama boomed. Between 1945 and 1960 there were more than 500 radio plays every year. The German word for radio drama or audio play is Hörspiel. Today Germany is a major market for radio plays worldwide. In particular, audio plays on CD are very popular. A popular audio play serial of Germany and of the world is Die drei ??? (Three Investigators).

Berlin's Prix Europa includes a Radio Fiction category.

=== India ===
Vividh Bharati, a service of All India Radio, has a long running Hindi radio-drama program: Hawa Mahal.

The Satyanweshi audio drama series created by actor Aneesh See Yay adapted twenty two Byomkesh Bakshi novels and eight original audio dramas in the Malayalam language.

=== Republic of Ireland ===
RTÉ Radio Drama is one of the oldest audio theatre departments in the radio world.

=== Japan ===
Radio dramas began in Japan in 1925, and enjoyed a great level of popularity after the hit of Tankou no Naka. This resulted in the NHK hiring famous writers to write radio drama scripts for 500 yen in 1930, equivalent to 1 million yen today.

Due to voice acting in Japan having its own distinct culture, audio dramas continue to be popular in Japan, where they are now primarily released on disc as "drama CDs" (ドラマCD). They are also referred to in Japanese as "voice dramas" (ボイスドラマ). Many such audio dramas are based on anime, manga, novels and video games, but there are also many that are completely original. Though most drama CDs are commercial products made by corporate entities, there has been a growing number of doujin audio dramas in recent years due to it being easier for hobbyists to obtain the equipment required to make recordings, and the Internet making distribution easier.

=== Norway ===
Radioteatret (Radio drama in Norway) has existed since 1926.

=== Poland ===
The first Polish radio drama, Warszawianka based on Stanisław Wyspiański's play, was produced in 1925 while the first radio drama written for radio was produced in 1929. Polish Radio has been successfully producing radio dramas since then – between 1925 and September 1939, over 2,500 were made. In 1956, Polish Radio started broadcasting Matysiakowie, which is currently one of the longest-running radio plays in the world. Audio plays based on literature are also popular in Poland, this is how the sound adaptations of George R. R. Martin's A Game of Thrones, Mario Puzo's The Godfather, Ken Follett's The Pillars of the Earth or Robert Kirkman's The Walking Dead were created. Since 1988, the Polish Radio Theatre has awarded the Wielki Splendor awards to actors and authors of radio dramas.

=== Romania ===
Radio theatre (Teatru Radiofonic ) has a long tradition in Romania. The first piece was played in 1929. The 7000+ piece repertoire includes radio adaptations of both Romanian and international books/plays across many genres interpreted by the greatest Romanian actors of the time.

=== South Africa ===
Radio broadcasting began in South Africa in 1924 and remained the dominant broadcast medium in the country until the late 1970s. Created by an act of Parliament in 1936, the South African Broadcasting Corporation (SABC) aired radio dramas along with news and British content in Afrikaans and English. Radio drama became more prominent with the launch of Springbok Radio, an English and Afrikaans commercial station operated by SABC between May 1950 and December 1985.

The SABC launched Radio Bantu in 1960s, broadcasting first in isiZulu and soon followed by other African languages, intended to serve as the apartheid state's propaganda channel. However, radio drama broadcast in African languages contributed to subverting the apartheid government by shaping culture and identity while challenging apartheid ideologies. Radio dramas were not subjected to the same level of apartheid editorial scrutiny, and therefore provided a forum for ideas without openly addressing politics. Radio drama evolved with changing socio-economic contexts. Female characters began to feature more prominently.

Radio drama continues to be a mainstay of South African radio. SABC's drama studios in each of the country's 9 provinces produce dramas for all 19 SABC radio stations. Recognising radio's reach, some private sector entities have also invested in radio drama, such as Standard Bank's 5-minute Iketsetse Zenzele radio drama which aired for 8 years to raise awareness about financial literacy, fraud, and cybercrimes. Non-governmental organisations widely use radio drama as part of campaigns for health awareness and rights activism, such as the long-running Soul Buddyz series focused on adolescent health, Masiphephe Radio Drama addressing gender-based violence, and the Plague in the Time of King Kapital and Queen Corona focused on COVID-19 awareness.

=== Thailand ===
A low power radio station "M.C.O.K. Radio 2" (formally Pira FM) introduces a new programming block called M.C.O.K. Television – aims to replace the regular evening music programmes. The programming block is composed of British radio dramas and an audio-described version of British TV programmes such as Doctor Who, EastEnders and Horrible Histories.

Since 1 November 2021, Radio dramas were scrapped and replaced with more (Audio-Described) programmes – All At Sea, Dad's Army, Mrs. Brown's Boys and The Outlaw. The radio station broadcasts on 87.2 MHz every evening / late night. Due to the nature of low-power VHF propagation, the coverage is very limited, the radio station can be heard only in Lat Luang (Bangkok / Samut Prakan area). It is the first radio station in Thailand to broadcast both English radio / TV programmes on FM.

=== Mainland China ===
Before 2010, radio dramas on mainland China were usually performed by organisations associated with the Chinese Communist Party, such as the Central Radio Drama Troupe (Chinese: 中央广播剧团), which was founded in 1954. Their content was also deeply related to the historical events of the corresponding period and they largely served as propaganda. 10,000 Pieces of Clipboards (Chinese: 一万块夹板), produced by the China National Radio in 1950 to commemorate the Great Strike of 7 February (Chinese: 二七大罢工), is considered to be the first radio drama after the CCP established the regime in mainland China. Similar radio dramas include The North Korean Zoya - Kim Yu Ji (Chinese: 朝鲜丹娘——金玉姬) and Thanks to Stalin (Chinese: 感谢斯大林).

With the development of the Internet and the spread of Japanese ACG culture, ACG fans on mainland China began to independently produce radio dramas at around 2010. These radio dramas are usually not broadcast on radio stations, but uploaded to online audio platforms like MissEvan.

== See also ==
- Amateur voice acting
- BBC Radio 4
- BBC Radio 4 Extra
- Books on the radio
- Closet drama
- Full cast audiobook
- List of BBC Radio programmes adapted for television#Television to radio transfers
- List of films based on radio series
- List of radio soap operas
- Performance art
- Pingshu (Chinese performing art often heard on radio)
- Podcasts
- Radio comedy
- Radio programming
- Saturday Night Theatre
- Television play
