= Radio audiobook =

Recording of text transmitted through radio for entertainment

Radio audiobook is a radio programming format for audiobooks. The programming is usually in series format due to the length of the books. The books may be abridged or unabridged, sometimes as dramatisations. The productions may be for radio only, or also distributed through other media such as vinyl record, cassette tape, CD-ROM and digital download. Books include all genres such as fiction and non-fiction. They are read by an actor, the author or a full-cast.

Channels which have regular audiobook programming include BBC Radio 4, BBC 6Music, Oneword and BBC World Service in the UK, RTÉ Radio 1 in Ireland, National Public Radio in the US, and ABC local radio and ABC Radio National in Australia.

The concept is differentiated from the radio reading service, which also consists of reading books in an audio format, in that the radio reading service is designed for accessibility to the visually impaired, illiterate and others unable to read, whereas the radio audiobook format is designed as entertainment for a general audience. The radio reading service is thus more restricted because it must read its material verbatim and lacks the artistic licence available to a radio audiobook format.

== List of audiobook shows ==
The following is a list of radio shows that play audiobooks. It is not a list of specific audiobooks.

=== BBC Radio 4 ===
- "Afternoon Reading" external link features either a short story or an abridged book.
- "Book at Bedtime" external link presents modern classics, new works by leading writers and literature from around the world.
- "Book of the Week" external link Non-fiction, biography, autobiography, travel, diaries, essays, humour and history.
- "Poetry Please" external link a selection of poems chosen by listeners.

=== BBC World Service ===
- "Off the Shelf" serialized books of many types. It is not on air anymore.

=== BBC 6Music ===
- "Steve Lamacq" external link Steve Lamacq's Library of Rock and Roll related books.
- "6Music's reading festival" external link Six Music celebrates reading, writing and books.

== RTÉ Radio 1 ==
- "Fiction 15" external link newly commissioned writing for younger listeners.
- "Francis Macmanus Short Story" external link short stories.
- "The Poem and the Place" external link brings together poems and the places which inspired them.

== ABC Radio National ==
- "The Book Reading" external link classic and contemporary fiction by Australian and world writers, read by actors.
- "Short story" external link two short stories a week.

== ABC local radio ==
- "Short story project" external link short stories from around Australia.

== Oneword ==
- Virtually all of Oneword's programming, 24 hours a day. external link

== See also ==
- The World's Great Novels
- NBC Presents: Short Story
