= Joss Whedon filmography =

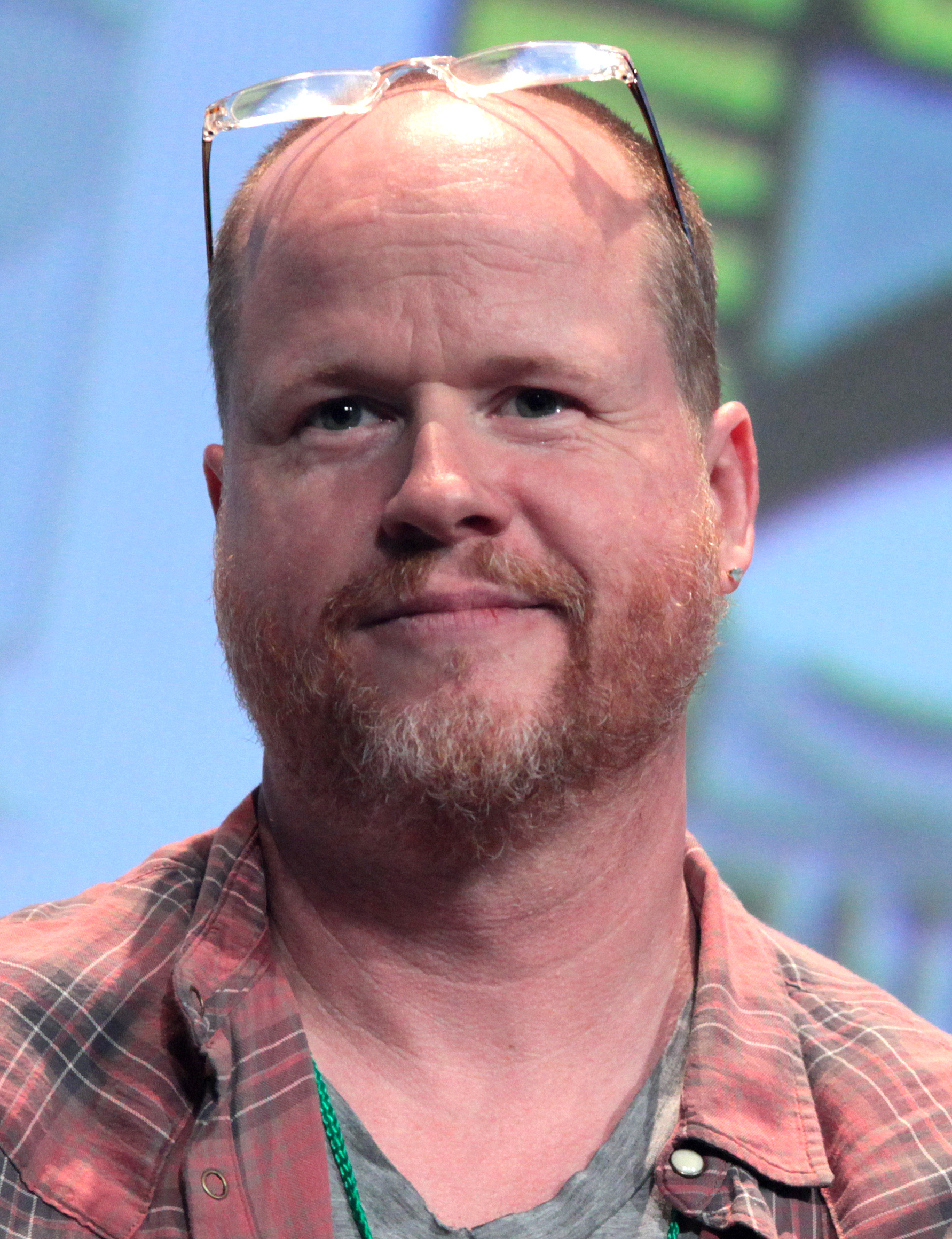
Whedon at the 2015 San Diego Comic-Con

American screenwriter, director and producer Joss Whedon has generated numerous films and television series over the course of his career.

== Film ==
Year	Title				
Year	Title	Director	Writer	Producer	Notes
1992	Buffy the Vampire Slayer	No	Yes	No	
1995	Toy Story	No	Yes	No	
1997	Alien Resurrection	No	Yes	No	
2000	Titan A.E.	No	Yes	No	
2001	Atlantis: The Lost Empire	No	Story	No	
2005	Serenity	Yes	Yes	No	Directorial debut
2011	The Cabin in the Woods	No	Yes	Yes	Also second unit director
2012	The Avengers	Yes	Yes	No	
2012	Much Ado About Nothing	Yes	Yes	Yes	Also composer and editor
2014	In Your Eyes	No	Yes	Executive	
2015	Avengers: Age of Ultron	Yes	Yes	No	
2017	Justice League	Uncredited	Yes	No	Director of reshoots and additional photography

=== Uncredited works ===
Additional dialogue

- The Getaway (1994)
- The Quick and the Dead (1995)

Rewrites

- Speed (1994)
- Waterworld (1995)
- Twister (1996)
- X-Men (2000)
- Captain America: The First Avenger (2011)
- Thor: The Dark World (2013)

Post-credits scene director

- Thor (2011)
- Captain America: The Winter Soldier (2014)

== Television ==
Year	Title	Director	Writer	Executive Producer	Creator	Notes
1989–1990	Roseanne	No	Yes	No	No	4 episodes
1990	Parenthood	No	Yes	No	No	3 episodes
1997–2003	Buffy the Vampire Slayer	Yes	Yes	Yes	Yes	Directed 20 episodes and wrote 27 episodes
1999–2004	Angel	Yes	Yes	Yes	Yes	Directed 6 episodes and wrote 11 episodes
2002–2003	Firefly	Yes	Yes	Yes	Yes	Directed 3 episodes and wrote 5 episodes
2005	Veronica Mars	No	No	No	No	Cameo, episode Rat Saw God
2007	The Office	Yes	No	No	No	Episodes "Business School" and "Branch Wars"
2009–2010	Dollhouse	Yes	Yes	Yes	Yes	Directed 3 episodes and wrote 5 episodes
2010	Glee	Yes	No	No	No	Episode "Dream On"
2013–2020	Agents of S.H.I.E.L.D.	Yes	Yes	Yes	Yes	Directed and wrote "Pilot"
2021	The Nevers	Yes	Yes	Yes	Yes	Directed 3 episodes and wrote 1 episode, Departed before release of the first season

== Online media ==
Year	Title	Director	Writer	Producer	Creator	Notes
2005	R. Tam sessions	Yes	Yes	Yes	No	Cameo appearance
2008	Dr. Horrible's Sing-Along Blog	Yes	Yes	Yes	Yes	Also music and lyrics
2017	Unlocked	Yes	No	No	No	Short film in support of Planned Parenthood

== See also ==
- Joss Whedon's unrealized projects
