= Joss Whedon's unrealized projects =

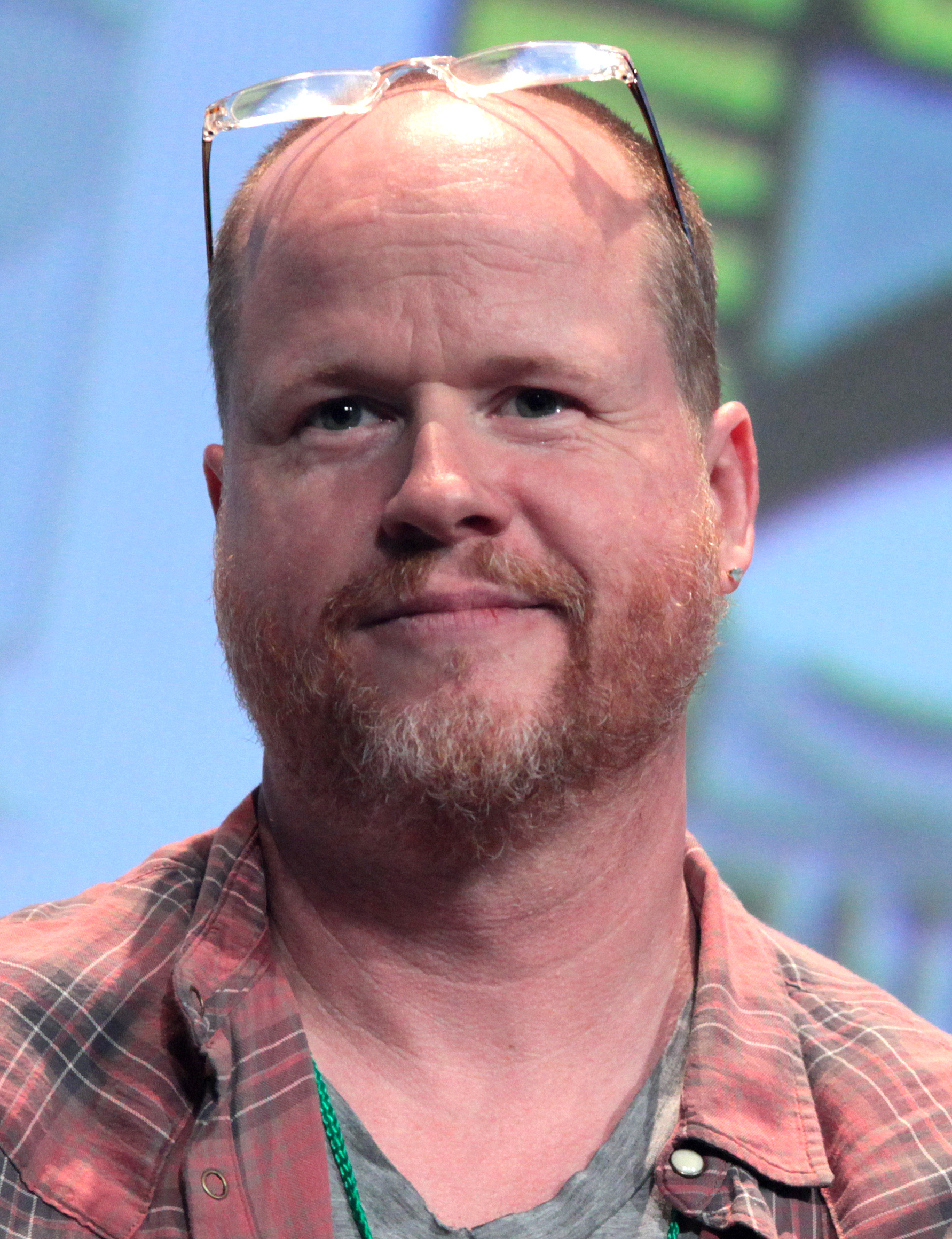
Whedon in 2015

During his career, American director and screen writer Joss Whedon has worked on a number of projects that never progressed beyond the pre-production stage.

== 1990s ==
=== Marco Polo ===
In the early 1990s, Whedon worked on a Disney animated musical version of Marco Polo, described as being in the vein of My Fair Lady. In addition to writing the script, Whedon also contributed the lyrics to three original songs that featured instrumentation from Robert Lindsey-Nassif.

=== Suspension ===
On June 25, 1993, Variety reported that Whedon had sold a spec script entitled Suspension to Largo Entertainment for $750,000, with a further $250,000 due if production commenced. The film was to be based on the premise of terrorists seizing control of New York City's George Washington Bridge during a traffic jam. On September 19, 2014, Empire reported that the script was being made, and that Liam Neeson was attached to star in the lead role.

=== Afterlife ===
In 1994, Whedon sold a spec script to Sony Pictures Entertainment entitled Afterlife for $1.5 million, with an additional $500,000 if production commenced. On March 13, 2000, Variety reported that Andy Tennant was in talks to direct and write the film. The film's plot was about a government scientist who awakes after dying to discover his mind has been imprinted on a mind-wiped body of a serial killer called Snowman. Although the project never progressed, some of the script's themes and ideas were later used in Whedon's TV show Dollhouse, which premiered in 2009.

=== Dracula ===
In 1998, it was announced in Variety that Whedon was developing an animated Dracula musical, his first original screenplay under a deal with 20th Century Fox. Whedon was expected to produce and write the songs.

=== Grampire ===
In addition to Dracula, Whedon was reportedly set to co-write the family film Grampire for 20th Century Fox, about "two kids who suspect their grandfather is a creature of the night", like the family film Grampire, about a boy, who with his friend, suspects his grandfather is a creature of the night."

=== Alienated ===
Another Whedon project in development at 20th Century Fox in 1998 was the comedy Alienated, about someone who is kidnapped by aliens and turns the tables on his captors. Whedon was expected to supervise script development and possibly co-write the film.

=== Cheap Shots ===
Also in 1998, Whedon's Mutant Enemy Productions was planning a mid-season TV pilot for Fox Broadcasting Co. entitled Cheap Shots. Co-written with Ty King, the sitcom was about a group of people making low-budget horror films at a B movie company.

== 2000s ==
=== Batman: Year One ===
Around 2001, Whedon was hired as writer for Darren Aronofsky's and Frank Miller's Batman: Year One after The Wachowskis' script was rejected by Warner Bros. Whedon's script featured a new, "more of a 'Hannibal Lecter' type" villain, and portrayed Bruce Wayne as "a morbid, death-obsessed kid" whose grief was overcome by protecting a girl from being bullied in an alley similar to where his parents were murdered. Whedon's script was rejected and both Aronofsky and Miller left the project, leading to its cancellation.

=== Buffy: The Animated Series ===
In 2001, Whedon and 20th Century Fox started the development of Buffy: The Animated Series, an animated spin-off of Whedon's popular TV show Buffy the Vampire Slayer. Whedon and Jeph Loeb were to produce the show while many actors of the original series were attached to reprise their roles. It was initially planned to be aired on Fox Kids, possibly as early as February 2002. However, Fox Kids ceased its operations in September 2002, and no other network picked up the series.

=== Ripper ===
In 2001, Whedon planned to make a spin-off miniseries or TV movie of Buffy the Vampire Slayer entitled Ripper, about the character Rupert Giles. On July 28, 2007, Whedon revealed via IGN that a 90-minute Ripper special would be made in 2008. Anthony Head was slated to reprise his role as Rupert Giles. The project was eventually abandoned, but some elements were later used in the comic book series Angel & Faith.

=== Alien 5 ===
Before Alien Resurrection had even been released in theaters, a 20th Century Fox executive said about a possible Alien 5, "Joss Whedon will write it, and we expect to have Sigourney and Winona if they're up for it." At the same time, Joss Whedon said, "There's a big story to tell in another sequel... The fourth film is really a prologue to a movie set on Earth. Imagine all the things that can happen... If I write this movie, and it has my writing credits on it, then it's going to be on Earth." However, he lost interest after the release of Alien Resurrection, saying "I'll tell you there was a time when I would have been interested in that, but I am not interested in making somebody else's franchise anymore. Any movie I make will be created by me." Sigourney Weaver, unaware of Whedon's change of heart, would go on to claim that he had in fact written a script. Whedon later joked about being surprised to find that he had written such a script.

=== Spike ===
In 2004, Whedon set plans for a Spike film. The film, if ever greenlighted, would star James Marsters, Alyson Hannigan and Amy Acker. At a convention, Acker stated the film was not going ahead due to funding issues.

=== Goners ===
In 2005 Whedon sold a spec script entitled Goners to Universal Pictures. Whedon was attached to write and direct the film, while Mary Parent and Scott Stuber were attached to produce it. During an interview with Fanboy Radio in 2006, Whedon spoke about the film: "I've been seeing a lot of horror movies that are torture-porn, where kids we don't care about are mutilated for hours, and I just cannot abide them... it's an antidote to that very kind of film, the horror movie with the expendable human beings in it. Because I don't believe any human beings are." The film's plot was described as a mystical fantasy thriller with a female lead named Mia. The project never materialized, some of its themes were reused for The Cabin in the Woods which was cowritten with Drew Goddard.

=== Wonder Woman ===
On March 17, 2005, Warner Bros. reported that Whedon was hired to write and direct the long time planned Wonder Woman feature film, while Joel Silver was attached to produce it. The film's plot was to focus on Wonder Woman's adventures during World War II. However, on February 2, 2007, MTV reported that Whedon was no longer attached to the project, leading to its cancellation. Whedon said "We just saw different movies, and at the price range this kind of movie hangs in, that's never gonna work. Non-sympatico. It happens all the time."

=== Dr. Horrible 2 ===
On May 11, 2009, Nathan Fillion revealed during an interview that Whedon was planning a sequel of his acclaimed miniseries Dr. Horrible's Sing-Along Blog. Whedon expressed his interest in making the sequel as another miniseries or as a feature film. On March 15, 2012, it was reported that the script would be written that summer and that the principal photography was to take place in 2013. However, the production was abandoned due to Whedon's commitments with Marvel Studios.

== 2010s ==
=== Wastelanders ===
On September 23, 2011, it was reported that Whedon had worked with comic book author Warren Ellis to create a webseries entitled Wastelanders, which was an "end-of-the-world" project. However, it was also announced that its production was cancelled due to Whedon's involvement with The Avengers.

=== Untitled World War II-set horror film ===
On October 20, 2016, Whedon revealed that he was writing a new project: a historical fiction/horror film set during World War II.

=== Untitled Star Wars standalone film ===
Whedon also expressed an interest in making a one-off Star Wars film after seeing the trailer of Rogue One. "I want to do that," he said. "To make a Star Wars movie and not be wed to the bigger picture.

=== Batgirl ===
In March 2017, Whedon was in negotiations to direct, write, and produce Batgirl set in the DC Extended Universe. After a year of development, he withdrew from the project in February 2018, stating that he could not come up with a working story for the movie.

=== Pippa Smith: Grown-Up Detective ===
In December 2020, TheWrap reported that Freeform decided not to move forward with Pippa Smith: Grown-Up Detective, a dark comedy series with Whedon as executive producer. The show had been in development at the Disney-owned cable channel since June 2018.

== See also ==
- Joss Whedon filmography
- Undeveloped Buffy the Vampire Slayer spinoffs
