= Simon Cole =

Chief Executive of UBC Media Group

Simon Andrew Cole (born 20 February 1958) is Chief Executive of UBC Media Group.

He co-founded the Unique Broadcasting Company in 1989, which floated on the London Stock Exchange in July 2000 as part of UBC Media Group. Simon started his radio career as a BBC trainee, moving to Manchester in the early 1980s where he became programme director at Piccadilly Radio. Whilst at Piccadilly, Simon helped pioneer the market for national sponsored programmes. He is a Fellow of The Radio Academy.
