= UBC Media Group =

British media company (1989–2014)

- Type: Public (LSE: UBC)
- Industry: Media
- Founded: 1989
- Headquarters: London, England, UK
- Key people: Simon Cole, Chief Executive; Tim Blackmore, Group Editorial Director
- Products: TV and Radio services
- Number of employees: 90 (2008)
- Website: www.ubcmedia.com

UBC Media Group was a production and content creation company which began as the Unique Broadcasting Company in 1989. In June 2014 the company merged with 7digital to form a global digital music and radio platform. The new company was called 7digital Group Plc.

== Staff ==
Unique Broadcasting Company (UBC) was founded by Simon Cole and Tim Blackmore in 1989.

Cole was Chief Executive, having started out as a trainee at the BBC and developed national sponsored programmes while at Piccadilly Radio in Manchester.

Blackmore was the Group Editorial Director, and had a background in radio production with BBC Radio One and Capital Radio. He was a Fellow of the Radio Academy.

== History ==
UBC bought the Classic Gold Digital Network which included digital and analogue licences from GWR Group in two separate transactions in 2000 and 2002 for about £2m. In 2007, UBC effectively sold them back for £3.95m to GCap Media - the company created from the merger of GWR Group and Capital Radio Group.

In July 2006, as part of UBC's move away from owning radio stations, it sold its share in Digital News Network (DNN) for £66k.

In December 2007, UBC bought the remaining 51% stake in Oneword Radio from Channel Four Television for £1, and then closed the loss-making speech DAB radio station one month later.

In May 2008, UBC announced its Commercial Division was being bought by the American company GTN for £15 million. The deal was expected to complete around the end of July 2008; a definitive agreement was announced in February 2009.

In June 2008, UBC announced it was closing down its loss-making venture Cliq, a service which allowed DAB listeners to download music onto their mobile phones. The system was designed to be implemented on DAB-enabled mobile phones, but few manufacturers had been interested in adding DAB to their handsets.

Two years on the company pulled out of DAB by selling its 7.5% stake in MXR Digital. The stake was bought by fellow shareholder Guardian Media Group for £136,000 plus a one-off cash dividend payment from MXR of £52,000.

The move was part of UBC's strategy to focus on the production of content and the development of interactive software. As part of the agreement, UBC was also released from its spectrum contracts that were due to run until 2015 with MXR. This enabled UBC to release circa £400,000 of provision which had been made to cover this contract.

In May 2014 UBC reversed its remaining assets into privately-only 7digital through a reverse acquisition.

== Divisions and Services ==
UBC Group had two divisions:

=== Broadcast Division ===
UBC produced Commissioned programming to the BBC via its production companies:

- Unique - Radio production (based in London)
- Smooth Operations - TV and Radio production (based in Manchester). Predominantly specialising in music and live music production, Smooth Operations also produced BBC events such as the BBC Radio 2 Folk Awards and the Radio Academy's annual industry conference The Radio Festival. Along with BBC commissioned programming, they produced TV content for Sky Arts, covering live music events such as Cambridge Folk Festival and Celtic Connections. They also produced commissioned radio programming for RTÉ 2fm.

The company also produced digital content in the form of podcasts for various clients, and in-house and outside broadcast production facilities from its base near Marylebone, London.

=== Digital Division ===
Unique Interactive produced software including:

- ManDLS - a system which updated the text on DAB sets
- EPG - an Electronic Programme Guide for DAB for EPG-capable devices

== Profitability ==
Before the sale of its Networked Programming division, UBC's business model relied heavily on providing content to commercial radio based on so-called "Barter syndication", effectively giving content to stations in exchange for selling some of their advertising airtime. But as revenues from radio advertising slumped, so did the group's profitability. UBC's post-tax operating loss for the year (2006–2007) was £1.26 million (compared to £193,000 in 2005-2006).

The company focussed on reducing costs and increasing profitability by ditching its digital radio stations and concentrating on providing content.
