= Channel 4 Radio =

Former radio brand in the United Kingdom

- United Kingdom

Ownership
- Owner: Channel Four Television Corporation

History
- First air date: January 2007
- Last air date: January 29, 2009

Channel 4 Radio was a radio brand and proposed radio station in the United Kingdom, launched by Channel Four Television Corporation in January 2007.

== History ==
In August 2004, The Guardian reported that Channel 4 had intentions to launch a national digital radio station. The corporation signed a development deal with UBC Media Group to explore a possible relaunch the latter's digital station Oneword. Chief executive of UBC Simon Cole said "much of the planning was [...] in place" by November that year.

In April 2005, Channel 4 announced they acquired a majority 51% stake in Oneword from UCB for £1m, although it relinquished this share to co-owner UBC Media in January 2008 for £1.

In January 2006, Channel 4 appointed Nathalie Schwarz, former strategy and development director at Capital Radio, to oversee its digital radio development.

Plans for the launch of Channel 4 Radio were announced in July 2006, with programming including daily podcasts produced by Channel 4 News, highlights of Big Brother, and a monthly book club presented by Richard and Judy.

In October 2008, amid that year's financial crisis, the corporation announced they would be abandoning its radio project in an effort to make £100m in savings. The website was taken offline on January 29, 2009.

== See also ==
- 4 Digital Group
