= Lou Merrill =

American radio actor (1912–1963)

- Cropped Photo of Lou Merrill
- Born: Louis Dilman Merrill; April 1, 1912; Winnipeg, Manitoba, Canada
- Died: April 7, 1963 (aged 51); Los Angeles, California, U.S
- Occupations: Actor, Narrator
- Years active: 1937–1963
- Spouse: Celeste Rush
- Children: 2 adopted daughters

Louis Dilman Merrill (April 1, 1912 – April 7, 1963) was an American actor, who worked primarily in radio from the 1930s through the 1950s.

== Early life ==
Lou Merill was born on April 1, 1912, in Winnipeg, Manitoba, Canada., and moved to the United States when he was young. He acted in stock theater and little theater before going to radio.

== Radio ==
Merrill began working in radio in 1928. He performed in Lux Radio Theater as a utility supporting player in nearly every broadcast from 1937 to 1939 (notably as Sleepy in Snow White and the Seven Dwarfs), and also served as an assistant director handling the crowd scenes during that time. He continued to work the show sporadically until 1953. His career in the 1930s also included roles in the children's Christmas series The Cinnamon Bear (as Santa Claus), the crime drama Big Town (as various gangsters and a stand-in for Edward G. Robinson as Steve Wilson), the soap opera Those We Love (as con man Ed Neely), and The Mickey Mouse Theater of the Air. He later worked for Arch Oboler on Arch Oboler's Plays and Lights Out. As related by Mr. Oboler on the Speaking of Radio show (1976), in one dramatic real-life confrontation, Mr. Oboler broke his hand on Mr. Merrill's jaw when the former became incensed over the latter's offensive attitude. A mutual respect resulted from the incident.

In 1941, he starred as the Nemo-like Captain Craig McKenzie in the now mostly lost sci-fi radio series Latitude Zero (on which the 1969 film of the same name is based). Twelve years later, he starred on the true crime anthology drama series Crime Classics. Merrill played Thomas Hyland, the host and narrator who was fascinated with crime. Radio comedy appearances included Point Sublime (a regular as jeweler Aaron Saul) and Abbott and Costello (guesting as Santa Claus) and the Life of Riley as Punchy (a punch drunk ex-prize fighter). He also appeared on Escape, The Man Called X, Suspense, NBC University Theater, On Stage, The CBS Radio Workshop, Rogue's Gallery, and The Six Shooter.

Merrill was the narrator for Retribution, a "psychological mystery series."

== Film ==
Merrill first appeared in film with the 1935 Columbia Pictures production The Black Room; he played the Story Teller in Trailer, though he was left uncredited. His formal debut in movies came in the 1939 Universal Studios production Tropic Fury. He appeared sporadically in films throughout the next three decades, often in small roles along with several uncredited appearances.

Year	Title	Role	Notes
1935	The Black Room	Story Teller in Trailer	Uncredited
1938	Flash Gordon's Trip to Mars	Dr. Metz	Serial, Uncredited
1939	Tropic Fury	Porthos Scipio	
1940	North West Mounted Police	Lesure	
1941	New Wine	Soldier	Uncredited
1942	Reap the Wild Wind	Captain of the 'Pelican'	
1943	Hangmen Also Die!	Industrialist	Uncredited
1943	Passport to Suez	Mr. Rembrandt	Uncredited
1947	The Lady from Shanghai	Jake Bjornsen	
1950	The Next Voice You Hear...	Radio announcer	Voice, Uncredited
1951	Cause for Alarm!	Mr. Phillips	Voice, Uncredited
1951	Sirocco	Egyptian	Uncredited
1951	The Family Secret	Reporter	Uncredited
1953	Confidentially Connie	Minor Role	Uncredited
1953	Fort Ti	Raoul de Moreau	Uncredited
1953	The Great Adventures of Captain Kidd	Lord Bellmore	Serial, [Chs. 1, 13–15], Uncredited
1954	Charge of the Lancers	Col. Zeansky	
1954	Phantom of the Rue Morgue	Pedestrian	Uncredited
1954	The Iron Glove	Count DuLusac	
1954	Sabaka	Koobah	
1955	Duel on the Mississippi	Georges Gabriel	
1955	The Crooked Web	Herr Schmitt	
1955	The Fighting Chance	Sammy	Uncredited
1957	The Giant Claw	Pierre Broussard	
1961	The Devil at 4 O'Clock	Aristide Giraud	

== Television ==
Merrill occasionally appeared on television, in episodes of such programs as Oboler Comedy Theater, The George Burns and Gracie Allen Show, I Love Lucy, The Lineup, Colt .45, Sugarfoot, The Millionaire, This Man Dawson, Shirley Temple's Storybook, Angel, and King of Diamonds.

== Voiceover narration ==
In his later years, Merrill continued doing voice-over work, regularly doing film trailer narration work for American International Pictures. Merrill narrated trailers for films such as It Conquered the World, I Was a Teenage Werewolf, War of the Colossal Beast, Teenage Cave Man, Night of the Blood Beast, A Bucket of Blood, Horrors of the Black Museum, The Angry Red Planet, Master of the World, and Burn, Witch, Burn.

== Personal life and death ==
Merrill was married to actress Celeste Rush. They had two adopted daughters. Merrill died on April 7, 1963, in Los Angeles, California, aged 51. He is buried at Hollywood Forever Cemetery.
