= Vic Perrin =

American actor (1916–1989)

- Born: Victor Herbert Perrin; April 26, 1916; Menomonee Falls, Wisconsin, U.S.
- Died: July 4, 1989 (aged 73); Los Angeles, California, U.S.
- Education: University of Wisconsin–Madison
- Occupations: Television and voice actor
- Years active: 1943–1989
- Spouses: Evelyn Held (m. 1963; died 1972) Rita Singer (m. 1977; div. 1979) (m. 1979)
- Children: 1

Victor Herbert Perrin (April 26, 1916 – July 4, 1989) was an American radio, film, and television actor, perhaps best remembered for providing the "Control Voice" in the original version of the television series The Outer Limits (1963 –1965). He was also a radio scriptwriter, as well as a narrator in feature films and for special entertainment and educational projects, such as the original Spaceship Earth and Universe of Energy rides at Epcot at the Walt Disney World Resort in Florida.

== Early years ==
Perrin was born in Menomonee Falls, Wisconsin, the elder of two sons of Kathryn (née Mittlesteadt) and Milton A. Perrin, who was a traveling salesman. In 1940, after graduating from the University of Wisconsin–Madison in the late 1930s, Vic moved to California.

== Career ==
=== Radio ===
During the 1940s and 1950s, Perrin was a regular performer on many commercial radio programs. In 1941, he became a staff announcer for NBC, staying there for several years before moving to ABC and becoming chief announcer at the Blue Network. His first credited role came in 1943, when he served as the announcer for "The Last Will and Testament of Tom Smith", a radio episode of Free World Theatre, which was produced and directed by Arch Oboler. He narrated "A Star with Two Names", part of the segment "Behind the Scenes Hollywood Story" of the Hollywood Music Hall radio program. At the same time, he joined Charles Laughton's theatrical repertory group.

Perrin was also a regular guest star on the radio version of Gunsmoke, and he wrote or co-wrote five scripts for that popular Western series between 1959 and 1961. Perrin was a series regular also on the anthology radio drama Family Theatre, played Ross Farnsworth on One Man's Family, and was featured as cavalry trooper Sergeant Gorse in Fort Laramie in 1956. He performed as several characters in Escape, Pete Kelly's Blues, Dragnet, Yours Truly, Johnny Dollar, and Have Gun – Will Travel. In an uncredited role, he also impersonated Clyde Beatty on The Clyde Beatty Show.

=== Television ===
One of Perrin's first television roles was in "The Golden Vulture", a 1953 episode of the Adventures of Superman. He went on to appear in 16 installments of Dragnet, as well as the pilot and multiple episodes of the 1967 revival of the series. He appeared in episodes of Gunsmoke, Maverick, The Big Valley, and Mission: Impossible. In 1959, he played Osborne in "The Mind Reader" of The Rifleman.

He played characters in a variety of other series, including Peter Gunn, Black Saddle, Have Gun – Will Travel, Mackenzie's Raiders, The Untouchables, Going My Way, Perry Mason, Adam-12, The F.B.I., and Mannix.

Perrin served as the Control Voice, the narrator of The Outer Limits, and provided voices for characters in episodes of Star Trek, as well as appearing in one episode. He also appeared in two episodes of The Twilight Zone. He also guest-starred in "The Guardians", a 1981 episode of Buck Rogers in the 25th Century.

Perrin did extensive voice work in animation. He voiced multiple characters on the Hanna-Barbera animated television series Scooby-Doo, Where Are You! Those characters include the Ape Man, Carl the Stuntman, Pietro, the Puppet Master, Dr. Najib, the Snow Ghost, Mr. Leech, Yeti, and Fu Lan Chi. Perrin was the voice of The Phantom Racer, Junkyard Watchman, Ken Rogers, Anthos, and John Thomas on The Scooby-Doo Show. Perrin was also the voice of Mr. McDabble, Mr. Kronos, and the Minotaur on The New Scooby and Scrappy-Doo Show. He also provided the voice of Dr. Zin, the main antagonist on Jonny Quest, along with voicing Roberts, Search Plane Pilot, Junior, Frogman Leader, Miguel, Kronick, Professor Ericson, and others on the series. Perrin voiced Creature King and Lurker on Space Ghost and Mekkor and the Captain of the Sky Pirates on The Herculoids. He voiced Number One, the Ruthless Ringmaster, and others on Birdman and the Galaxy Trio along with Red Ghost, Silver Surfer, Professor Gamma, and the Demon on Fantastic Four (1967 TV series). He was the voice of Hawkman on Filmation's The Superman/Aquaman Hour of Adventure and Aquaman (TV series). Perrin voiced Sinestro, who is the nemesis of the Green Lantern, along with voicing Dr. Starns, Turkish Engineer, Brain Creature, Professor Reed, and Frankenstein's Monster on Challenge of the Superfriends. He voiced Namor and Caesar Cicero on Spider-Man (1981 TV series). He voiced Thor, Zerona's Soldier, and Black Knight on Spider-Man and His Amazing Friends. He provided additional voices on The New Fantastic Four, Spider-Woman, and The Incredible Hulk (1982 TV series). His other voiceovers include Ming the Merciless on the 1982 television film Flash Gordon: The Greatest Adventure of All, produced by Filmation, Teetor in the 1984 animated musical film Gallavants produced by Marvel Productions, ans a reprisal voice role in 1986 as Dr. Zin on The New Adventures of Jonny Quest. Other Hanna-Barbera shows on which he provided additional voices are the live-action and animated fantasy television series The New Adventures of Huckleberry Finn as Castway Charlie, Centaur, Doorgah, High Priest, Rabbit, and Chief, Help!... It's the Hair Bear Bunch! as Professor Neilsen Rockabuilt, Inch High, Private Eye; These Are the Days; Clue Club; Jabberjaw; Captain Caveman and the Teen Angels as Mummy, Brackish, and Professor Pryce; Jana of the Jungle; Super Friends (1980 TV series) as Sailor; The Smurfs; and The Greatest Adventure: Stories from the Bible.

=== Other voice work ===
For many years, Perrin narrated dozens of science and educational short films for educational filmmaking pioneer Sy Wexler and continued to do voiceovers and to play character roles until a short time before his death.

Perrin was active in off-camera work in television commercials, prompting one newspaper article to include the comment, "Vic Perrin is one actor who makes more money when he's not seen on camera than when he is." He was also the original voice narrator for Disney's Epcot Center attraction Spaceship Earth in Orlando, Florida. Vic Perrin also narrated two movies in the original Epcot Center Universe of Energy pavilion: "Kinetic Energy" and "Energy Creation Story".

== Personal life and death ==
He was first married to Evelyn Held on March 10, 1963. Held died in 1972, and they had no children. He married for a second time to Rita Singer in 1977 and had a son, George. He also had a stepson Steven, from Singer's previous marriage. Perrin and Singer divorced in January 1979 but remarried in September of the same year.

Perrin died of cancer at Cedars-Sinai Medical Center in Los Angeles, California, on July 4, 1989, aged 73.

== Filmography ==
=== Film ===
Year	Title	Role	Notes
1947	Magic Town	Elevator Starter	Uncredited
1950	Outrage	Andy	
1952	Don't Bother to Knock	Elevator Operator	Uncredited
1952	The Iron Mistress	Gambling House Attendant	Uncredited
1953	The System	Little Harry Goubenek	
1953	Julius Caesar	Hoodlum	Uncredited
1953	The Twonky	TV Salesman	Uncredited
1953	Forever Female	Scenic Designer	
1954	Riding Shotgun	Bar-M Rider with Lynching Rope	
1954	Dragnet	Deputy D.A. Adolph Alexander	
1954	Black Tuesday	Dr. Hart	
1959	City of Fear	Radio Announcer	Uncredited
1960	Spartacus	Narrator	Uncredited
1962	Gorath		Voice
1963	Heavenly Bodies!	Narrator	Uncredited
1963	Wall of Noise	Louie the Brain	Uncredited
1965	Joy in the Morning	Law Professor	Uncredited
1966	The Singing Nun	Farmer in Accident with Sister Ann	Uncredited
1966	One Million Years B.C.	Narrator	Uncredited
1966	The Bubble	Taxi Driver	
1968	Vixen!	Narrator	Voice, Uncredited
1968	Bullitt	Voice, Uncredited	
1969	Cherry, Harry & Raquel!	Narrator	Voice, Uncredited
1970	Airport	Crabby Man	Uncredited
1970	Zig Zag	Fingerprint Expert	Uncredited
1972	Gargoyles	Gargoyle Leader	Uncredited Voice
1973	The Deadly Trackers		Voice, Uncredited
1974	The Take	Radio Announcer	Uncredited
1974	The Klansman	Hector	
1975	The Hindenburg	Travel Agency's Representative	Uncredited
1977	Black Oak Conspiracy	Mr. Finch	
1979	Heidi in the Mountains	Grandfather / The Doctor / Postman	English version, Voice
1984	Gallavants	Teetor	Voice

=== Television (selected) ===
Year	Title	Role	Notes
1953	Adventures of Superman	Scurvy	Episode: "The Golden Vulture"
1955 –1958	Sergeant Preston of the Yukon	Narrator	48 episodes, voice, uncredited
1956	Gunsmoke	Hank Springer	Episode "No Handcuffs"
1957	Gunsmoke	Wilbur Haskins	Episode "What The Whiskey Drummer Heard"
1957	Have Gun - Will Travel	Rheinhart	Episode "Winchester Quarantine"
1958	Wanted Dead or Alive	Willie Jo Weems	Episode "Fatal Memory"
1960	The Twilight Zone	Martian	Episode "People Are Alike All Over"
1960	Have Gun - Will Travel	Arnold	Episode "Show of Force"
1960	Have Gun - Will Travel	Storekeeper Frazier	S3:E21 "The Night the Town Died"
1960	Have Gun - Will Travel	Sheriff Cooley	Episode "The Campaign of Billy Banjo"
1961	Have Gun - Will Travel	Drunk	Episode "Everyman"
1961	The Untouchables	Inky Beggs	Episode "The Underground Court"
1963	The Twilight Zone	Jim – Trooper	Episode "Ring-a-Ding Girl"
1964	Gunsmoke	Henry Huckaby	Episode "The Promoter"
1963 –1965	The Outer Limits	Control Voice	49 episodes, voice, uncredited
1964 –1965	Jonny Quest	Dr. Zin	4 episodes, voice
1966	Dragnet 1966	Don Negler	television movie, broadcast 1969
1967	Mannix	Tony - Syndicate Boss	S1:E2 "Skid Marks on a Dry Run"
1967	Star Trek	Metron	Episode "Arena"; voice, uncredited
1967	Star Trek	Nomad	Episode "The Changeling", voice
1967	Star Trek	Tharn	Episode "Mirror, Mirror"
1971	Adam-12	Everett Jones – Victim	
1977	Wonder Woman	Gorel	Episodes "Judgment from Outer Space: Parts 1 & 2"
1979	Buck Rogers in the 25th Century	Draconia PA Announcer	Episode "Awakening", voice, uncredited
1981	Buck Rogers in the 25th Century	First Guardian	Episode "The Guardians"
1982	Flash Gordon: The Greatest Adventure of All	Prince Vultan	Television film
1986 –1987	The New Adventures of Jonny Quest	Dr. Zin	3 episodes, voice
