= Reed Hadley =

American actor (1911–1974)

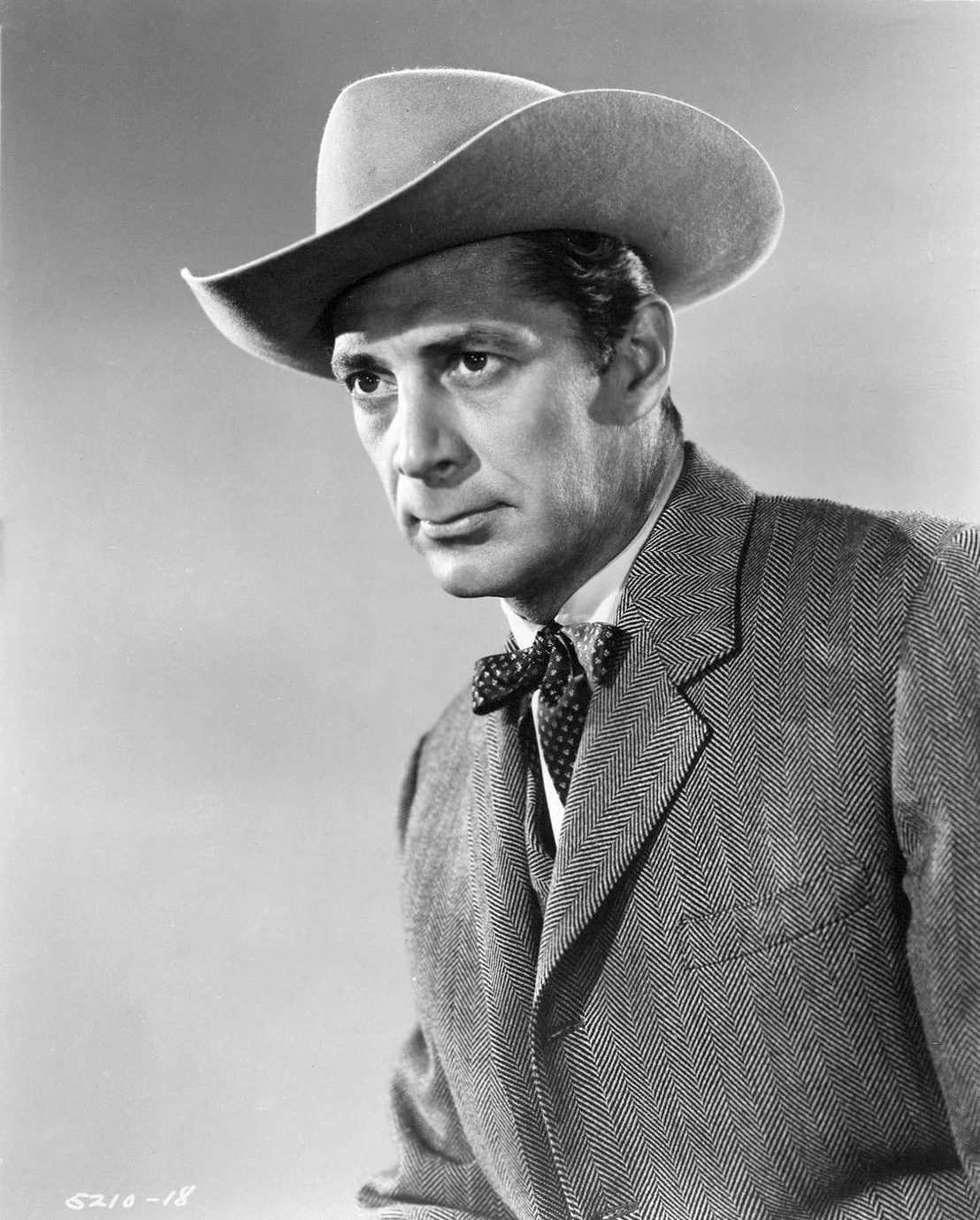
- Reed Hadley in Kansas Pacific (1953)
- Born: Reed Herring; June 25, 1911; Petrolia, Texas, U.S.
- Died: December 11, 1974 (aged 63); Los Angeles, California, U.S.
- Burial place: Forest Lawn Memorial Park, Los Angeles, California
- Occupation: Actor
- Years active: 1938–1971
- Spouse: Helen Hadley (m. 19??)
- Children: 1

Reed Hadley (born Reed Herring, June 25, 1911 – December 11, 1974) was an American film, television, and radio actor.

== Career ==
Hadley was born in Petrolia, Texas. Before moving to Hollywood, he acted in Hamlet on stage in New York City, a last-minute substitute for the scheduled actor who failed to appear to portray Fortinbras.

=== Radio ===
In the 1950s, Hadley played Chad Remington on Frontier Town. He also was one of the actors who portrayed cowboy hero Red Ryder on the Red Ryder series during the 1940s.

On September 16, 1950, Hadley was on Tales of the Texas Rangers episode "Candy Man".

=== Television ===
Hadley starred in two television series, Racket Squad (1950–1953), as Captain Braddock, and The Public Defender (1954–1955), as Bart Matthews, a fictional attorney for the indigent. He also was a guest star on such programs as the religion anthology series, Crossroads, and Rory Calhoun's CBS Western series, The Texan. In 1959, he played Sheriff Ben Tildy in The Texan episode "The Sheriff of Boot Hill" and was pitted against bad guys Denver Pyle cast as saloon keeper Joe Lufton and his gunslinging partner Charles Maxwell cast as Luke Stricker. He also guest-starred in Sea Hunt season four, episode four, "Vital Error". In 1958, he played the rapacious mining baron Mort Galvin in season one's "The Sacramento Story" on Wagon Train.

=== Film ===
Throughout his 35-year career in film, Hadley was cast as both a villain and a hero of the law, in such movies as The Baron of Arizona (1950), The Half-Breed (1952), Highway Dragnet (1954), and Big House, U.S.A. (1955), and narrated a number of documentaries. In films, he starred as Zorro in the 1939 serial Zorro's Fighting Legion.

Hadley was the narrator of several Department of Defense films: Operation Ivy, about the first hydrogen bomb test, Ivy Mike; Military Participation on Tumbler/Snapper; Military Participation on Buster Jangle; The B-47 (T.F. 1–4727); and Operation Upshot–Knothole, all of which were produced by Lookout Mountain Studios. The films were originally intended for internal military use, but have been "sanitized" and declassified, and are now available to the public.

In 1945, he narrated The Nazi Plan, a documentary film using captured propaganda and newsreel footage to dramatize the Nazis' rise to power and was used by the prosecution in the International Military Tribunal in Nuremberg. He served as the narrator on various Hollywood films, including House on 92nd Street (1945), Boomerang (1947), and The Iron Curtain (1948).

== Personal life and death ==
Hadley and his wife, Helen, had one son, Dale. On December 11, 1974, Hadley died of a heart attack in Los Angeles. He was 63. He was survived by his wife and son.

== Recognition ==
Hadley has a star at 6553 Hollywood Boulevard in the Television section of the Hollywood Walk of Fame. It was dedicated on February 8, 1960.

== Filmography ==
=== Film ===
- Hollywood Stadium Mystery (1938) - Ralph Mortimer (film debut)
- Female Fugitive (1938) - Bruce Dunning
- The Great Adventures of Wild Bill Hickok (1938, Serial) - Jim Blakely
- Sunset Murder Case (1939) - Oliver Helton
- Orphans of the Street (1938) - Miller
- Sergeant Madden (1939) - Lawyer (uncredited)
- Calling Dr. Kildare (1939) - Tom Crandell
- Bachelor Mother (1939) - Polly's First Dance Partner (uncredited)
- Stronger Than Desire (1939) - Flagg's Party Guest (uncredited)
- Man from Montreal (1939) - Ross Montgomery aka L. R. Rawlins
- Zorro's Fighting Legion (1939, Serial) - Don Diego Vega / Zorro
- I Take This Woman (1940) - Bob Hampton
- Ski Patrol (1940) - Ivan Dubroski
- Meet the Wildcat (1940) - Basso—Henchman
- The Bank Dick (1940) - Francois
- Flight Command (1940) - Admiral's Aide (uncredited)
- Adventures of Captain Marvel (1941, Serial) - Rahman Bar [Ch. 1, 11-12]
- Sky Raiders (1941, Serial) - Caddens - Henchman
- The Flame of New Orleans (1941) - Party Guest (uncredited)
- Ziegfeld Girl (1941) - Geoffrey's Friend in Audience (uncredited)
- I'll Wait for You (1941) - Tony Berolli
- Whistling in the Dark (1941) - Beau Smith
- Unfinished Business (1941) - Party Guest (uncredited)
- Sea Raiders (1941, Serial) - Carl Tonjes
- Appointment for Love (1941) - Ferguson (uncredited)
- Look Who's Laughing (1941) - Master of Ceremonies (uncredited)
- Road Agent (1941) - Henchman Shayne
- Arizona Terrors (1942) - Jack Halliday aka Don Pedro de Berendo
- The Bugle Sounds (1942) - Court-Martial Judge (uncredited)
- Jail House Blues (1942) - Boston
- Juke Box Jenny (1942) - Brother Wicks
- The Mystery of Marie Roget (1942) - Naval Officer
- Lady in a Jam (1942) - Man (uncredited)
- Now, Voyager (1942) - Henry Montague (uncredited)
- I Married a Witch (1942) - Young Man (uncredited)
- Wintertime (1943) - Radio Announcer (voice, uncredited)
- Guadalcanal Diary (1943) - War Correspondent / Narrator
- Happy Land (1943) - Off-Screen Narrator (uncredited)
- Four Jills in a Jeep (1944) - Fighter Pilot Dispatcher on Loudspeaker (uncredited)
- Buffalo Bill (1944) - Narrator (uncredited)
- Pin Up Girl (1944) - Radio Announcer (voice, uncredited)
- The Eve of St. Mark (1944) - Radio Announcer (voice, uncredited)
- Roger Touhy, Gangster (1944) - FBI Agent Boyden
- Home in Indiana (1944) - Narrator in Opening Scene (uncredited)
- Wing and a Prayer (1944) - Cmdr. O'Donnell
- Wislon (1944) - White House Usher (uncredited)
- Rainbow Island (1944) - High Priest Kahuna
- In the Meantime, Darling (1944) - Maj. Phillips
- Circumstantial Evidence (1945) - Prosecutor
- Diamond Horseshoe (1945) - Intern (uncredited)
- Don Juan Quilligan (1945) - Announcer of Pearl Harbor Attack (uncredited)
- Captain Eddie (1945) - News Announcer (uncredited)
- A Bell for Adano (1945) - Cmdr. Robertson
- The Caribbean Mystery (1945) - Dr. Rene Marcel
- House on 92nd Street (1945) - Narrator (voice, uncredited)
- Leave Her to Heaven (1945) - Dr. Mason
- Doll Face (1945) - Flo Hartman
- The Last Bomb (1945, Short, Documentary) - Narrator
- Shock (1946) - District Attorney O'Neill
- The Dark Corner (1946) - Police Lt. Frank Reeves
- It Shouldn't Happen to a Dog (1946) - Mike Valentine
- If I'm Lucky (1946) - Jed Conklin, Magonnagle's Campaign Manager
- The Razor's Edge (1946) - Party Waiter (voice, uncredited)
- 13 Rue Madeleine (1946) - Narrator (voice, uncredited)
- Boomerang (1947) - Off-Screen Narrator (voice, uncredited)
- The Brasher Doubloon (1947) - Dr. Moss (uncredited)
- Louisiana (1947)
- The Fabulous Texan (1947) - Jessup
- T-Men (1947) - Narrator (uncredited)
- Captain from Castile (1947) - Juan Escudero (uncredited)
- Panhandle (1948) - Matt Garson
- The Man from Texas (1948) - Marshal Gregg
- The Iron Curtain (1948) - Narrator (uncredited)
- Canon City (1948) - Narrator (voice)
- A Southern Yankee (1948) - Fred Munsey
- The Return of Wildfire (1948) - Marty Quinn
- Jungle Goddess (1948) - Radio Newscaster (uncredited)
- Walk a Crooked Mile (1948) - Narrator (voice)
- He Walked by Night (1948) - Narrator (voice, uncredited)
- Last of the Wild Horses (1948) - Riley Morgan
- I Shot Jesse James (1949) - Jesse James
- Rimfire (1949) - The Abilene Kid
- Grand Canyon (1949) - Mitch Bennett
- Apache Chief (1949) - Narrator (voice, uncredited)
- Red Desert (1949) - Narrator (voice, uncredited)
- Riders of the Range (1950) - Clint Burrows
- The Baron of Arizona (1950) - Griff
- Motor Patrol (1950) - Detective Robert Flynn
- A Modern Marriage (1950) - Dr. Donald Andrews
- The Return of Jesse James (1950) - Frank James
- The Killer That Stalked New York (1950) - Narrator (uncredited)
- Dallas (1950) - Wild Bill Hickok
- Insurance Investigator (1950) - Chuck Malone
- Little Big Horn (1951) - Sgt. Maj. Peter Grierson
- The Wild Blue Yonder (1951) - Commanding Officer (uncredited)
- The Half-Breed (1952) - Frank Crawford
- Son of Ali Baba (1952) - Minor Role (uncredited)
- Kansas Pacific (1953) - Bill Quantrill
- Woman They Almost Lynched (1953) - Bitterroot Bill Maris
- Highway Dragnet (1954) - Det. Lt. Joe White Eagle
- Big House, U.S.A. (1955) - FBI Special Agent James Madden
- All in a Night's Work (1961) - General Pettiford (uncredited)
- Gunfight at Comanche Creek (1963) - Narrator (uncredited)
- Moro Witch Doctor (1964) - Robert Collins
- Young Dillinger (1965) - Federal Agent Parker
- The St. Valentine's Day Massacre (1967) - Hymie Weiss
- The Fabulous Bastard from Chicago (1969) - Narrator (voice)
- Brain of Blood (1971) - Amir (final film)

=== Television ===
- Racket Squad (1951–1953) - Captain John Braddock
- Public Defender (1954–1955) - Bart Matthews
- Wagon Train (1958) - Mort Galvin
- Bat Masterson (1958) - Raoul Cummings
- The Red Skelton Hour (1958) - Prof. L. M. Treadway/District Attorney
- Rawhide (1959) - Clement
- The Restless Gun (1959) - Colonel Bromley/Mayor Love
- Perry Mason (1964) as Medical Examiner
- Hondo (1967) - Morgan Slade
- Green Acres (1969) - Pilot

== Other works ==
=== Radio ===
Year	Program	Episode/source
1942-44	Red Ryder	
1950	Tales of the Texas Rangers	Candy Man
1952	Stars in the Air	"On Borrowed Time"
