= Red Ryder (radio series) =

American radio western series

- Genre: Western
- Running time: 15 minutes (7:30 pm – )
- Country of origin: United States
- Language: English
- Home station: Mutual Broadcasting System
- Syndicates: NBC Blue Network, Don Lee Network
- Starring: Reed Hadley; Carlton KadDell; Brooke Temple; Arthur Q. Bryan; Horace Murphy; Jim Mather; Robert Blake; Dan White (actor); Tommy Cook; Frank Bresee; Henry Blair; Johnny McGovern; Sammy Ogg.
- Announcer: Ben Alexander; Art Gilmore
- Written by: Paul Franklin, Albert Van Antwerp
- Produced by: Brad Brown
- Original release: February 3, 1942 – 1951
- Opening theme: "The Dying Cowboy" (Bury Me Not on the Lone Prairie)
- Sponsored by: Langendorf bread

Red Ryder was an American radio western series based on the popularity of the comic strip Red Ryder by Stephen Slesinger and Fred Harman. It debuted on February 3, 1942, on the NBC Blue Network and was broadcast three days a week, on Tuesdays, Thursdays and Saturdays. After the sixth episode Langendorf Bread became its prime sponsor. The final episode was broadcast in 1951.

== History ==
Since "Red Ryder" aimed a young audience the violence was toned down a bit. Unlike the comics Red was not active as a lawman, but mostly worked as a cowhand. Only when the stories asked for it did he get involved in acting like a (deputy) sheriff. Red also never killed his enemies, only shot their guns out of their hands. Another difference was the name of Red's sweetheart. In the comics her name was Beth Wilder, while on the radio she was named Jane Bruce.

Originally the show was successful enough to beat its rival, The Lone Ranger, in radio ratings. However, when the network sold the series to the Mutual Broadcasting System it was no longer broadcast in the east side of the United States. Mutual and Langendorf continued the series on the West Coast Don Lee Network through the 1940s at 7:30pm on Tuesdays, Thursdays, and Saturdays, always with the familiar organ theme, "The Dying Cowboy" ("Bury Me Not on the Lone Prairie"). The introduction of television also meant the end of the radio series and its transfer to the small screen.

== Cast ==
- Red Ryder: Reed Hadley (1942–1944), Carlton KaDell (1945) and Brooke Temple (1946–1951).
- Buckskin: Horace Murphy
- Little Beaver: Tommy Cook (1942 on), Frank Bresee (1942–46, alternating with Cook), Henry Blair (1944–47), Johnny McGovern (1947–50), Anne Whitfield (1950–51) and Sammy Ogg (1950–51).
- Roland Rawhide Rollinson: Arthur Q. Bryan

== Club ==
The Red Ryder Victory Patrol, a club founded in 1942 to encourage people in conservation practices that would help the war effort, was directly inspired by the radio show's popularity. Young listeners could get application cards from their local grocery stores and mail them in. In return there would receive a membership card, a certificate, a secret decoder and a 32-page comic book about "Red Ryder".

In 1944, Warner Bros. produced a parody of the character in the short Buckaroo Bugs: Red-Hot Ryder (whom the narrator described as "Brooklyn's famous fighting cowboy"). The character was portrayed as a bumbling simpleton, harassed by Bugs Bunny.
