= Domo Arigato (film) =

1972 3-D film

- Directed by: Arch Oboler
- Release date: 1972
- Country: United States

Domo Arigato (aka Thank you very much) is a 3-D film which was produced in 1972 and shown in limited theatrical runs, mainly larger markets. It was re-released in 1991. A med school drop out and GI (Jason Ledger) returning from a tour in Vietnam travels the scenic Japanese countryside with an American tourist from Kansas (Bonnie Sher) who harbors a secret in this travelogue romantic melodrama. The use of the SpaceVision 3-D camera rig provides some stunning stereoscopic effects throughout. This was Arch Oboler's follow up 3-D film after The Bubble (1966).
