= Florence Ravenel =

American actress

- Born: March 18, 1896; Michigan, U.S.
- Died: December 18, 1975 (aged 79); Los Angeles, California, U.S.
- Other names: Florence Ray, Florence Ravanel, Florence Ravenal
- Education: Hunter College, Neighborhood Playhouse School of the Theatre
- Occupation: Actress
- Years active: 1923–1966

Florence Ravenel (March 18, 1896 – December 18, 1975) also known as Florence Ray, was an American stage, radio and film actress, perhaps best known for her work on the radio series The Court of Missing Heirs, and on the TV sitcom The Farmer's Daughter.

== Early life and career ==
Born in Michigan, but raised primarily in Brooklyn, New York, Ravenel attended Hunter College and the Neighborhood Playhouse School of the Theatre.

=== Stage ===
Ravenel made her professional dramatic debut—billed as Florence Ravanel—in the fall of 1923 with the William Augustin Players in Gloucester, Massachusetts. Of her performance in Avery Hopwood's Fair and Warmer, Billboard reported, "Florence Ravanel made a hit as Laura Bartlett". Shortly thereafter, Ravenel found more lucrative employment with the Al Luttringer Players. Towards the end of a three-week engagement with that troupe at the Music Hall Theatre in Akron, Ohio (featuring The Cat and the Canary, Getting Gertie's Garter, Guy Bolton's Polly, Preferred, and My Irish Cinderella), The Beacon Journal singled out Ravenel's contribution, noting that the actress had tackled "hard roles and won praise from her audience."

Between 1925 and 1927, Ravenel appeared in stock company revivals of Lightnin' (portraying Mildred Buckley, "and doing it with a certain charm"), Parlor, Bedroom and Bath as Angelica Irving (a role previously played onscreen by Kathleen Kirkham, and subsequently by Dorothy Christy) and, as Madeleine, in the Goodman-Knoblock adaptation of Robert Keable's Simon Called Peter. Also in 1927, she appeared "to splendid advantage" alongside Jack Davis and William Rath as Keala Leilani in the premiere of Tropical Love, a South Seas-set melodrama staged at the Majestic Theatre in Waukegan, Illinois. At that same venue the following month, Ravenel was the main attraction in Anita Loos' Gentlemen Prefer Blondes, "giv[ing] an absorbing performance of the part—i.e. Lorelei Lee—which was played by June Walker in New York"

As of February 1928, Ravenel appears to have taken up residence in Chicago, Illinois, where her membership in that city's Associate Players was advertised in the Southtown Economist. In March, the company's production of Avery Hopwood's The Alarm Clock featured Ravenel as Mrs. Dunsmore. That summer, Ravenel toured with Jeanne Eagels' company in a vaudeville recreation of scenes from Eagels' recent vehicle, The Cardboard Lover. The following year, she gave a well-received performance as Arlette in a revival of Seventh Heaven staged by the Guy and Eloda Beach stock company in La Crosse, Wisconsin.

=== Radio ===
In 1933, Ravenel was promoted from the ranks of KYW staffers to host the station's daily noontime dance program featuring Rex Maupin's orchestra. Beginning in the fall of 1937, Ravenel was heard, alongside Jack Brinkley, Elizabeth Reller, Dorothy Day, Henry Saxe, John Goldsworthy, Bob Middleton, and others in The Court of Missing Heirs. She was also featured as Mrs. Sniffer on Arnold Grimm's Daughter. On January 30, 1943, Ravenel was one of the few non-singing performers heard in Chicago Theater of the Air's production of Victor Herbert's Sweethearts. In 1948, Ravenel, Parley Baer, Jerry Farber and announcer Patrick McGeehan were among those featured on the Catholic program, The Hour of St. Francis. Beginning in 1951, she co-starred with Lamont Johnson, Raymond Burr and Ruth Swanson in The Pendleton Story, produced by the Armed Forces Radio Service, described as the service's "first family series for overseas release."

Between 1950 and 1952, Ravenel also appeared in at least two episodes each of Dr. Christian and NBC Theater, most notably in the latter's production of Ibsen's Hedda Gabler, starring Virginia Christine and featuring Ravenel as Aunt Julie.

=== Film and television ===
In the fall of 1951, Ravenel joined 12 fellow former radio actors in the cast of Arch Oboler's The Twonky.

Making a brief return to the stage in 1956, Ravenel appeared with Naomi Stevens and many others in what The Hollywood Reporter's Marvin Smith judged a much-improved revival of Sumner Locke Elliott's unsuccessful Broadway comedy, Buy Me Blue Ribbons, providing an ideal showcase for the show's star, a young Paul Smith.

== Filmography ==
=== Film ===
Year	Title	Role	Notes
1952	Love Is Better Than Ever	Mother	uncredited
1953	By the Light of the Silvery Moon	Gossip	
1953	The Twonky	Nurse	uncredited
1955	Violent Saturday	Miss Shirley	uncredited
1955	I'll Cry Tomorrow	Stage Mother	uncredited
1958	Going Steady	Mrs. Potter	
1961	All in a Night's Work	Matron	uncredited
1965	Zebra in the Kitchen	Town Gossip	uncredited
1966	The Ghost and Mr. Chicken	Minor role	uncredited

=== Television ===
Year	Title	Role	Notes
1952	Big Town		Episode: "Father and Son"
1952	I Married Joan		Episode: "Jitterbug"
1953	I Married Joan	Mrs. Miller	Episode: "Little Girl"
1953	Schlitz Playhouse	Eunice (uncredited)	Episode: "The Governess"
1955	The Mickey Rooney Show	Maggie	Episode: "Scoop Mulligan"
1956	The Adventures of Superman	Mrs. Cooper - Landlady	Episode: "Jimmy the Kid"
1956	Star Stage		Episode: "The Man in the Black Robe"
1956	Studio 57	Caroline	Episode: "Little Miss Bedford"
1957	Official Detective	Mrs. Richards	Episode: "Take Him Alive"
1960	The Millionaire	Mrs. Tenney (as Florence Ravenal)	Episode: "Millionaire Margaret Stoneham"
1961	Day in Court	NA	Episode: NA
1961	Day in Court	NA	Episode: NA
1962	The Brighter Day	NA	Episode: NA
1963	The Farmer's Daughter	Cook	Episode: "The Speechmaker"
1964	The Farmer's Daughter	Cook (as Florence Ravenal)	Episode: "Mrs. Golden's Opportunity"
1964	The Farmer's Daughter	Millie	Episode: "Nobody's Perfect"
1964	The Farmer's Daughter	Cook	Episode: "Rendezvous for Two"
1964	The Farmer's Daughter	Cook (as Florence Ravenal)	Episode: "The Waiting Game"
1965	My Three Sons	Woman	Episode: "Monsters and Junk Like That"

== Personal life and death ==
On December 18, 1975, Ravenel died at age 79 in Los Angeles of undisclosed causes, predeceased by her mother.
