= Lights Out (radio show) =

American old-time radio program

Wyllis Cooper, creator of Lights Out!

Lights Out is an American old-time radio program devoted mostly to horror and the supernatural. Created by Wyllis Cooper and then eventually taken over by Arch Oboler, versions of Lights Out aired on different networks, at various times, from January 3, 1934, to the summer of 1947 and the series eventually made the transition to television. Lights Out was one of the earliest radio horror programs, predating Suspense and Inner Sanctum, and was the first to gain a large following.

== History ==
=== The Wyllis Cooper era ===
In late 1933, NBC writer Wyllis Cooper conceived the idea of "a midnight mystery serial to catch the attention of the listeners at the witching hour". The idea was to offer listeners a dramatic program late at night, at a time when the competition was mostly airing music. Though there had been efforts at horror on radio previously (notably The Witch's Tale), there does not seem to have been anything quite as explicit or outrageous as this on a regular basis.

The first series of shows (each 15 minutes long) ran on a local NBC station, WENR, at midnight Wednesdays, starting in January 1934. At some point, the serial concept was dropped in favor of an anthology format emphasizing crime thrillers and the supernatural. By April, the series proved successful enough to expand to a half-hour. In January 1935, the show was discontinued in order to ease Cooper's workload (he was then writing scripts for the network's prestigious Immortal Dramas program), but was brought back by huge popular demand a few weeks later. After a successful tryout in New York City, the series was picked up by NBC and broadcast nationally, usually late at night and always on Wednesdays. The first episode aired on April 17, 1935. When Lights Out switched to the national network, a decision was made to tone down the gore and emphasize tamer fantasy and ghost stories. An effort was made to air it as late as possible for the sake of the people on the West Coast whose clocks were three hours earlier than those in New York and who were distressed or offended by the program.

Cooper's run was characterized by grisly stories spiked with dark, tongue-in-cheek humor, a sort of radio Grand Guignol. A character might be buried, eaten, or skinned alive, vaporized in a ladle of white-hot steel, absorbed by a giant slurping amoeba, have his arm torn off by a robot, or forced to endure torture, beating or decapitation—always with the appropriate blood-curdling acting and sound effects. Cooper stayed on the program until June 1936, when another Chicago writer, Arch Oboler, took over. By the time Cooper left, the series had inspired about 600 fan clubs.

Only one recording survives from Cooper's 1934–1936 run, but his less gruesome scripts were occasionally rebroadcast. An interesting example is his "Three Men," which became the series' annual Christmas show (a 1937 version circulates among collectors under titles like "Uninhabited" or "Christmas Story"); it has a plot typical of Cooper's gentler fantasies. On the first Christmas after World War I, three Allied officers meet by chance in a train compartment and find one another vaguely familiar. They fall asleep and share a dream in which they are the Three Wise Men searching for Jesus. But is it really a dream? In the best tradition of supernatural twist endings, Cooper has the officers wake to find a strange odor in their compartment—which turns out to be myrrh and frankincense.

In the mid-1940s, Cooper's decade-old scripts were used for three brief summertime revivals of Lights Out. The surviving recordings reveal that Cooper was experimenting with both stream of consciousness and first-person narration a few years before these techniques were popularized in American radio drama by, among others, Arch Oboler and Orson Welles. In one tale (The Haunted Cell, original broadcast date unknown, rebroadcast 7/20/1946), a murderer describes how the Chicago police try to beat a confession out of him. When that doesn't work, they put him in a jail cell haunted by the ghost of a previous occupant, a smooth gangster named Skeeter Dempsey who describes his own execution and discusses the afterlife knowledgeably. In the final twist, the narrator reveals that he has taken Skeeter's advice to commit suicide and is now himself a ghost.

Another story, originally broadcast in March 1935 as "After Five O'Clock" and revived in 1945 as "Man in the Middle," allows us to follow the thoughts of a businessman as he spends a day at the office cheating on his wife with his secretary. The amusing contrast between what the protagonist thinks to himself and what he says out loud to the other characters enlivens one of Cooper's favorite plot devices, the love triangle.

One radio critic, in reviewing a March 1935 episode that used multiple first-person narrators, said:

Technique in writing and producing this script is one of pure radio license and can't even be compared to the flashback from the movies, since characters dead at the close of the tale do considerable talking of their experiences. This feat, combined with the terse, stark sock of the drama, is probably one of the most realistic pieces radio has ever presented.

Other Cooper scripts are more routine, perhaps in part because the author's attention was divided by other projects. From the summer of 1933 until August 1935, Cooper was NBC Chicago's continuity chief, supervising a staff of writers and editing their scripts. He resigned in order to devote more time to Lights Out as well as a daily aviation adventure serial, Flying Time. At various times, he also served on NBC's Program Planning Board, wrote the soap opera Betty and Bob, and commuted weekly to produce another program in Des Moines, Iowa.

From early 1934 to mid 1936, Cooper produced close to 120 scripts for Lights Out. Some episode titles (all from 1935) include "The Mine of Lost Skulls," "Sepulzeda's Revenge," "Three Lights From a Match," "Play Without a Name," and "Lost in the Catacombs" (about a honeymoon couple in Rome who lose their way in the catacombs under the city). Typical plots included:

- A novelist, struggling to write a locked room mystery, locks himself in his office only to be interrupted by a stranger who resembles the story's murderer.
- A killer named "Nails" Malone has "a conference with his conscience" about the murders he's committed.
- A scientist accidentally creates a giant amoeba that grows rapidly, eats living things (like the lab assistant's cat), and exhibits powers of mind control.

The show benefited tremendously from Chicago's considerable pool of creative talent. The city was, like New York, one of the main centers of radio production in 1930s America. Among the actors who participated regularly during the Cooper era were Sidney Ellstrom, Art Jacobson, Don Briggs, Bernardine Flynn, Betty Lou Gerson, and Betty Winkler. The sound effects technicians frequently had to perform numerous experiments to achieve the desired noises. Cooper once had them build a gallows and wasn't satisfied until one of the sound men personally dropped through the trap. The series had little music scoring save for the thirteen chime notes that opened the program (after a deep voice intoned, "Lights out, everybody!") and an ominous gong which was used to punctuate a scene and provide the transition to another.

A veteran radio dramatist, Ferrin Fraser, wrote some of the scripts.

=== The Arch Oboler era ===
When Cooper departed, his replacement—a young, eccentric and ambitious Arch Oboler—picked up where he left off, often following Cooper's general example but investing the scripts with his own concerns. Oboler made imaginative use of stream-of-consciousness narration and sometimes introduced social and political themes that reflected his commitment to antifascist liberalism.

Although in later years Lights Out would be closely associated with Oboler, he was always quick to credit Cooper as the series' creator and spoke highly of the older author, calling him "the unsung pioneer of radio dramatic techniques" and the first person Oboler knew of who understood that radio drama could be an art form.

In June 1936, Oboler wrote and directed his first episode for Lights Out. The play performed in the episode, titled "Burial Services", was about a paralyzed girl who gets buried alive. The episode was poorly received, and outraged listeners sent more than 50,000 letters to NBC. Afterwards, NBC banned the program from airing before 11 p.m. His next story, one of his most popular efforts, was the frequently repeated "Catwife," about the desperate husband of a woman who turns into a giant feline. He followed with "The Dictator," about Roman emperor Caligula. This set the pattern for Oboler's run: For every two horror episodes, he said later, he would try to write one drama on subjects that were ostensibly more serious, usually moral, social, and political issues.

Like Cooper, Oboler was much in demand and highly prolific. While working on Lights Out, he wrote numerous dramatic sketches for variety shows (The Chase and Sanborn Hour, Rudy Vallee's programs), anthologies (Grand Hotel, The First Nighter Program, The Irene Rich Show) and specials. In August 1936, singer Vallee, then the dean of variety show hosts, claimed that Lights Out was his favorite series. Oboler occasionally redrafted his Lights Out scripts for use on Vallee's and other variety hours. A version of Oboler's "Prelude to Murder" starring Peter Lorre and Olivia de Havilland was scheduled to air on a November 1936 Vallee broadcast. Other Lights Out plays that turned up on various late 1930s variety programs included "Danse Macabre" (with Boris Karloff), "Alter Ego" (with Bette Davis) and "The Harp."

Oboler met the demand by adopting an unusual scripting procedure: He would lie in bed at night, smoke cigarettes, and improvise into a Dictaphone, acting out every line of the play. In this way, he was able to complete a script quickly, sometimes in as little as 30 minutes, though he might take as long as three or four hours. In the morning, a stenographer would type up the recording for Oboler's revisions. Years later, Rod Serling, who counted radio fantasists like Cooper, Oboler, and Norman Corwin among his inspirations, would use a similar process to churn out his many teleplays for The Twilight Zone, a series that in many respects was to television what Lights Out was to radio.

Despite acclaim for Oboler's dramas, NBC announced it was canceling the series in the summer of 1937. According to the Chicago Tribune, NBC did so "just to see whether listeners are still faithful to it", and encouraged readers to send letters to the station and ask for it to be revived. After two months off the air, NBC revived the program in September following a successful letter writing campaign.

In the spring of 1938, the series earned a good deal of publicity for its fourth anniversary as a half-hour show when actor Boris Karloff, the star of many Hollywood horror films, traveled to Chicago to appear in five consecutive episodes. Among his roles: an accused murderer haunted by an unearthly woman-like demonic creature (played by Templeton Fox) urging him to "kill...kill...kill" in "The Dream"; the desperate husband in a rebroadcast of "Catwife"; and a mad, violin-playing hermit who imprisons a pair of women, threatening to murder one and marry the other, in "Valse Triste."

Oboler left in the summer of 1938 to pursue other projects, writing and directing several critically acclaimed dramatic anthology series: Arch Oboler's Plays, Everyman's Theatre, and Plays for Americans. A variety of NBC staff writers and freelancers filled in until Lights Out was canceled in 1939. NBC Chicago continuity editor Ken Robinson supervised some of the writing. Regular contributors included William Fifield and Hobart Donovan. A recording of the fifth anniversary show survives from this season. Donovan's "The Devil's Due," about criminals haunted by a mysterious stranger, is in keeping with the formula laid down by Cooper. The final episode aired on August 16, 1939.

In 1942, Oboler, needing money, revived the series for a year on CBS. Airing in prime time instead of late at night, the program was sponsored by the makers of Ironized Yeast. Most of the Lights Out recordings that exist today come from this version of the show. For this revival, each episode began with an ominously tolling bell over which Oboler read the cryptic tagline: "It...is...later...than...you...think." This was followed by a dour "warning" to listeners to turn off their radios if they felt their constitutions were too delicate to handle the frightening tale that was about to unfold.

Directing and hosting the 1942–43 broadcasts, mostly from New York and Hollywood, Oboler not only reused scripts from his 1936–38 run but also revived some of the more fantasy-oriented plays from his other, more recent anthology series. Some episodes had originally aired on the author's groundbreaking, critically acclaimed 1939–1940 program Arch Oboler's Plays, among them:

- "The Ugliest Man in the World," a sentimental tale of a hideously deformed man seeking love in a cruel world, inspired by Boris Karloff's typecasting in horror roles.
- "Bathysphere," a political thriller about a scientist and a dictator sharing a deep sea diving bell.
- "Visitor from Hades," about a bickering married couple trapped in their apartment by a doppelgänger.

Another unusual script, "Execution," about a mysterious French woman who bedevils the Nazis trying to hang her, had previously aired on Oboler's wartime propaganda series Plays for Americans.

Like Cooper, Oboler made effective use of atmospheric sound effects, perhaps most memorably in his legendary "Chicken Heart," a script that debuted in 1937 and was rebroadcast in 1938 and 1942. It features the simple but effective "thump-thump" of an ever-growing, ever-beating chicken heart which, thanks to a scientific experiment gone wrong, threatens to engulf the entire world. Although the story bears similarities to an earlier Cooper episode (about an ever-growing amoeba that makes an ominous "slurp! slurp!" sound), Oboler's unique choice of monster was inspired by a Chicago Tribune article announcing that scientists had succeeded in keeping a chicken heart alive for a considerable period of time after its having been removed from the chicken. Recordings of the original radio broadcasts are lost or unavailable, although Oboler later recreated this episode for a record album in 1962. Part of the episode's notoriety stems from a popular standup routine by comedian Bill Cosby (on his 1966 album Wonderfulness), an account of his staying up late as a child to listen to scary radio shows against his parents' wishes and being terrified by the chicken heart. Cosby also referenced the episode in a camping episode of Fat Albert and the Cosby Kids.

Other well-remembered Oboler tales, many of them written in the 1930s and rebroadcast in the '40s, include:

- "Come to the Bank," in which a man learns to walk through walls but gets stuck when he tries to rob a vault.
- "Oxychloride X," about a chemist who invents a substance that can eat through anything (and releases monsters when it eats all the way through the Earth's crust.)
- "Murder Castle," based on the real-life case of H. H. Holmes, Chicago's notorious serial killer.
- "Profits Unlimited," a still-relevant allegory on the promises and dangers of capitalism.
- "Spider," in which two men attempt to capture a giant arachnid.
- "The Flame," a weird exercise in supernatural pyromania.
- "Sub-Basement," which finds yet another husband and wife in peril—this time trapped far beneath a department store in the subterranean railway of the Chicago Tunnel Company.

Lights Out often featured metafictional humor. Perhaps inspired by Cooper's "The Coffin in Studio B," in which actors rehearsing an episode of Lights Out are interrupted by a mysterious coffin salesman peddling his wares, Oboler wrote stories like "Murder in the Script Department," in which two Lights Out script typists become trapped in their building after hours as frightening, unexplained events occur. In "The Author and the Thing," Oboler even plays himself pitted against one of his own monstrous creations.

After the 1942–43 Lights Out, Oboler continued to work in radio (Everything for the Boys and revivals of Arch Oboler's Plays) and pursued a second career in filmmaking, first in the Hollywood mainstream and then as an independent producer, writing and directing a number of offbeat, low-budget films, including Five, about survivors of a nuclear war, The Twonky, a satire of television, and the 3-D film Bwana Devil, which made a huge profit on a small investment. He dabbled in live television (a six-episode 1949 anthology series, Arch Oboler Comedy Theater), playwriting (Night of the Auk), and fiction (House on Fire). In 1962, he produced a spoken-word album entitled Drop Dead! (Capitol T/ST-1763), which recreated abbreviated versions of his Lights Out thrillers, including "Chicken Heart" and "The Dark," about a mysterious creeping mist that turns people inside-out. In 1971–1972, Oboler produced a syndicated radio series, The Devil and Mr. O (he liked for people to call him "Mr. O"), which featured vintage recordings from Lights Out and his other series with newly recorded introductions by Mr. O himself.

=== Later revivals ===
The success of Oboler's 1942–1943 Lights Out revival was part of a trend in 1940s American radio toward more horror. Genre series like Inner Sanctum, Suspense and others drew increasingly large ratings. Perhaps with this in mind, NBC broadcast another Lights Out revival series from New York in the summer of 1945, using seven of Wyllis Cooper's original 1930s scripts. Like Oboler's, this revival aired in the early evening and not late at night, and because of this, it was reported, "only those Cooper scripts which stressed fantasy rather than horror" were broadcast. These included a bloodless ghost story about a man who accidentally condemns his dead wife to haunt a nearby cemetery and "The Rocket Ship", science fiction involving interstellar travel. Cooper, then an advertising executive at New York's Compton Agency, may have had little or nothing to do with the actual broadcasts other than allowing his scripts to be performed.

This was followed by an eight-episode revival in the summer of 1946, from NBC Chicago, although at least one of the scripts is not by Cooper (an adaptation of Charles Dickens' "The Signal-Man"). This series also avoided the use of outright gore. In fact, a review in Variety complained that the premiere episode, "The Seven Plovers", was "a little too serious in content for a thriller" since it included "religious background, philosophical discussion and dream diagnosis ..."

A third series of eight vintage Cooper scripts was scheduled to run in the summer of 1947 as well. Broadcast from Hollywood over ABC Radio, it starred Boris Karloff and was sponsored by Eversharp, whose company president canceled the series after the third episode, apparently unhappy with the gruesome subject matter. The premiere, "Death Robbery", featured Karloff as a scientist who brings his wife back from the dead, only to find she's become a gibbering homicidal maniac. An uncredited Lurene Tuttle plays the wife. This episode is one of the few surviving examples of Cooper's Lights Out work that reflects the sort of explicit horror that characterized the original series. Eversharp paid off Cooper for his five unused scripts and Lights Out ended its long run on network radio.

In 1947, Cooper created Quiet, Please, another radio program dealing with the supernatural, which he wrote and directed until 1949, occasionally borrowing ideas from his Lights Out stories while creating wholly new scripts that were often more sophisticated than his 1930s originals. In 1949 and 1950, he produced (and contributed scripts to) three live TV series that frequently dealt with the supernatural: Volume One, Escape and Stage 13.

== Television ==
In 1946, NBC Television brought Lights Out to TV in a series of four specials, broadcast live and produced by Fred Coe, who also contributed three of the scripts. NBC asked Cooper to write the script for the premiere, "First Person Singular", which is told entirely from the point of view of an unseen murderer who kills his obnoxious wife and winds up being executed. Variety gave this first episode a rave review ("undoubtedly one of the best dramatic shows yet seen on a television screen"), but Lights Out did not become a regular NBC-TV series until 1949.

Coe initially produced this second series but, for much of its run, the live 1949–1952 program was sponsored by appliance maker Admiral, produced by Herbert Bayard Swope Jr., directed by Laurence Schwab Jr., and hosted by Frank Gallop. Critical response was mixed but the program was successful for several seasons (sometimes appearing in the weekly lists of the ten most watched network shows) until competition from the massively popular sitcom I Love Lucy on CBS helped to kill it off.

The 1949–1952 series featured scripts by a variety of authors, including a young Ira Levin. In 1951, producer Swope even bought a few stories from Cooper and Oboler. "Dead Man's Coat," starring Basil Rathbone, was adapted from one of Cooper's 1930s plays (and not to be confused with his Quiet, Please episode "Wear the Dead Man's Coat" with which it shares a similar premise). Oboler's "And Adam Begot," adapted by Ernest Kinoy from a radio play, starred Kent Smith. Among the young actors employed was Leslie Nielsen, who appeared in several episodes including "The Lost Will of Dr. Rant," based on "The Tractate Middoth", an M. R. James story. These and many others are available on DVD.

Other notable guest stars included Anne Bancroft, Grace Kelly, Eva Marie Saint, Lee J. Cobb, Anthony Quinn, Jessica Tandy, Veronica Lake, John Forsythe, Boris Karloff, Beatrice Straight, Eli Wallach, Vincent Price, Jane Wyatt, Felicia Montealegre Bernstein and Jack Palance.

Notable directors included Delbert Mann and Fred Coe.

=== Episodes ===
Partial List of Episodes of Lights Out
| Date | Episode | Actor(s) |
|---|---|---|
| December 19, 1949 | "The Elevator" | Royal Dano, Helene Dumas, Dolores Badaloni, Jack Hartley, James van Dyke |
| December 26, 1949 | "The Man Who Couldn't Lose" | NA |
| May 29, 1950 | "How Love Came to Professor Gildea" | Arnold Moss |
| June 26, 1950 | "Encore" | Donald Hammer |
| July 17, 1950 | "The Devil to Pay" | Theodore Marcuse, Grace Kelly, Jonathan Harris |
| July 31, 1950 | "The Strange Case of John Kingman" | NA |
| November 20, 1950 | "Dr. Heidegger's Experiment" | Billie Burke |

=== Later versions ===
In 1972, NBC aired yet another TV incarnation of Lights Out, a TV movie pilot which was not well received. In fact, Oboler (who was then syndicating his The Devil and Mr. O radio show) announced publicly that he had nothing to do with it.

Despite its modest television success, radio historian John Dunning suggested that the legend of Lights Out is "firmly rooted in the radio days".

== Influence ==
- "What the Devil" (1942), about two motorists menaced by a truck whose driver they cannot see, was similar in plot to Steven Spielberg's TV movie Duel, adapted by Richard Matheson from his own short story. Oboler, feeling his copyright had been infringed, claimed in an interview that he "reached for a lawyer and got paid off by Universal Studios".

== See also ==
- List of Lights Out episodes

== Listen to ==
- Theater of the Ears: Lights Out
- Lights Out, radio series; 86 episodes available for download at the Internet Archive
