= Chicken Heart =

Chicken Heart(s) may refer to:

- Chicken Heart, a 2002 Japanese film with Hiroyuki Ikeuchi
- "Chicken Heart", a comedy track by Bill Cosby from the 1966 album Wonderfulness
- "Chicken Heart", a 1937 episode of the radio show Lights Out
- Chicken Heart, a character from the 1989 film Long Arm of the Law Part 3
- "Chicken Hearts", a 1990 episode of the TV series Roseanne

== See also ==
- Heart § Cuisine
