= Everyman's Theater =

Anthology drama radio series

- Genre: Drama
- Running time: 30 minutes
- Country of origin: United States
- Language(s): English
- Syndicates: NBC
- Created by: Arch Oboler
- Written by: Arch Oboler
- Directed by: Arch Oboler
- Produced by: Arch Oboler
- Original release: October 4, 1940 – March 28, 1941
- No. of episodes: 26
- Opening theme: "Death and Transfiguration"
- Sponsored by: Oxydol

Everyman's Theater is a 30-minute old-time radio dramatic series. Its 26 episodes were broadcast on NBC from October 4, 1940, through March 28, 1941.

Created by Arch Oboler, Everyman's Theater succeeded Arch Oboler's Plays after the latter program was canceled. One website commented: "Arch Oboler's Plays was Oboler's breakout dramatic showcase over radio. Everyman's Theater further established Oboler's versatility and range, while underscoring Oboler's growing appeal to a far wider audience than he'd already established with Lights Out."

Some of the program's plays were original with Oboler; others were adapted by him. A number of the episodes used scripts that had already been presented on radio. Plays presented on Everyman's Theater included "None but the Lonely Heart," "Ivory Tower," "The Laughing Man," "The Ugliest Man in the World" and "Lust for Life." Stars featured included Joan Crawford, Bette Davis, Katharine Hepburn, Raymond Massey, Boris Karloff. Norma Shearer, Marlene Dietrich and Franchot Tone.

Oboler had tight control over all facets of the program and was responsible for writing scripts and directing episodes. He was paid $4,000 per week, out of which he, in turn, paid actors and musicians involved in each production. Oboler had a passion for authenticity, as illustrated by his hiring a full symphony orchestra to play music written by Tchaikovsky for the play, "None but the Lonely Heart." His productions featured "offbeat plotting, realistic sound effects, and stream-of-consciousness narration."
