= Big House, U.S.A. =

1955 film by Howard W. Koch

- Theatrical release poster
- Directed by: Howard W. Koch
- Screenplay by: John C. Higgins
- Story by: George W. George; George F. Slavin
- Produced by: Aubrey Schenck
- Starring: Broderick Crawford; Ralph Meeker; Reed Hadley; William Talman; Lon Chaney Jr. Charles Bronson
- Cinematography: Gordon Avil
- Edited by: John F. Schreyer
- Music by: Paul Dunlap
- Production company: Bel-Air Productions
- Distributed by: United Artists
- Release dates: March 11, 1955 (New York); June 1, 1955 (Los Angeles)
- Running time: 83 minutes
- Country: United States
- Language: English

Big House, U.S.A. is a 1955 American crime film noir directed by Howard W. Koch, written by John C. Higgins and starring Broderick Crawford, Ralph Meeker, Reed Hadley, William Talman, Lon Chaney Jr. and Charles Bronson. The film was released on March 3, 1955 by United Artists.

== Plot ==
At a summer camp near a Colorado national park, a young boy runs a short race against his fellow campers and collapses with a severe asthma attack. The boy is taken to the camp's infirmary where nurse Emily Evans tries to help him with a drug administered by injection. The boy, who is terrified of needles, flees into the woods, where Jerry Barker finds him.

Park ranger Erickson tries to calm wealthy Robertson Lambert, the missing boy's frantic father. Barker demands a $200,000 ransom and warns Lambert not to tell anyone or he will kill his son. Lambert agrees to pay the ransom, but when the boy tries to escape from his hiding place, he accidentally falls to his death. When Barker returns with the ransom money and sees the dead child, he coldly throws the body over a cliff and buries most of the money.

Caught by agent Madden of the FBI, Barker is convicted of extortion but not murder because the body is not found. He is sent to prison, where the warden hopes to intimidate Barker by exposing him to four hardened convicts: bank robber Rollo Lamar, smuggler Alamo Smith and cold-blooded killers Mason and Kelly.

Barker becomes known as the "ice man" because of his cold persona in the courtroom during his conviction. He gains the inmates' trust after discovering their escape plan and not informing the authorities. They include him in the breakout, hoping to capture some of the hidden ransom money.

Madden is in hot pursuit and discovers that Emily has been a party to Barker's scheme from the start. Back in the park, the fugitives turn on each other until only two are left. Mason is gunned down and Lamar begs for his life. The money is recovered, Barker and Lamar return to prison to face the gas chamber, and Emily receives a long prison sentence.

== Cast ==
- Broderick Crawford as Rollo Lamar
- Ralph Meeker as Geraldo "Jerry" Barker
- Reed Hadley as FBI Special Agent James Madden
- William Talman as William "Machine Gun" Mason
- Lon Chaney Jr. as Alamo Smith
- Charles Bronson as Benny Kelly
- Felicia Farr as Emily Euridice Evans
- Roy Roberts as Chief Ranger Will Erickson
- Willis Bouchey as Robertson Lambert
- Peter J. Votrian as Danny Lambert
- Robert Bray as Ranger McCormick

== Reception ==
In a contemporary review for The New York Times, critic Howard Thompson wrote: "'Big House, U.S.A.' is an idea for a good crime melodrama gone wrong ... Somebody, we repeat, at least had the right idea. ... [I]n the film's biggest mistake, we see the boy accidentally killed and disposed of, along with the genuine suspense. ... Although they supposedly have based the script on a real unsolved case, both director Howard W. Koch and John C. Higgins, the scenarist, have kept the sleuthing methodical and on the sidelines. They clear the decks for some graphic but standard bloodiness on the part of Mr. Meeker and his snarling kind. ... And where, during all this, are the anguished parents of the missing child? Don't ask us."
