= Gallavants =

1984 animated feature film

- Directed by: Art Vitello
- Screenplay by: Jack Mendelsohn
- Story by: Annie Shaw Marcus; Shasti Frigell O'Leary; Don Smith
- Based on: characters created by Shasti Frigell O'Leary
- Produced by: Art Vitello
- Starring: Robert Lydiard; Vic Perrin; Peter Cullen; Joyce Gittlin
- Edited by: Joe Siracusa; Don Smith; Art Vitello
- Music by: Stan Wietrzychowski
- Production companies: Marvel Productions (Marvel Television)
- Distributed by: Shapiro Entertainment; Mediafare Entertainment; Celebrity Home Entertainment
- Release date: November 28, 1984
- Running time: 104 minutes
- Country: United States
- Language: English
- Budget: $5 million

Gallavants is an American 1984 animated musical film produced by Marvel Productions, and released on home video. It was based on a toy line by Amtoy.

== Plot ==
Gallavants are ants living in their own fairy-tale land, Ganteville. The little ones have to go to school in preparation of their adult life as working ants. However, one pupil, named Shando, thinks he doesn't need to take lessons and work hard, in order to find his destination in life. He has to learn the hard way... He goes on many adventures to earn his "kabump," a bump on his abdomen that signifies his rank as a fully-fledged member of Gallavant society, and along the way must rescue a lost Gallavant egg and outsmart a Vanterviper, a two-headed worm-like creature resembling an amphisbaena that eats the Gallavants and their eggs. He also meets a small, mysterious bouncing ball that is thought to have been a runaway egg that got exposed to the light, which he mistakes for his kabump.

== Voice cast ==
- Robert Lydiard as Shando
- Vic Perrin as Teetor
- Peter Cullen as Antonim
- Joyce Gittlin as Eegee
- Frank Welker as Antik/Traw
- Fred Travalena as Fice/Gokin
- Barry Gordon as Edil/Bok/Gank
- Diane Pershing as Nessa
- Jane Hamilton as Queen Mallikam
- B. J. Ward as Galli
- Wendy Hoffman as Babags/Foll
- Fred McGrath as Kubo
- Charlie Callas as Azor
- Ken Sansom as Thunk (the narrator)

=== Uncredited ===
- Unknown voice actor as Koosh

== Songs ==
- "Every Grant Serves Us All" (Performed by Teetor)
- "Our Little Gallavant Bod"
- "Double Huggin'"
- "Galavant and shake shake shake"
- "Granting Day"
- "Close Your Eyes"
- "Eggs in the Bin"
- "I'll Follow"
- "Memories of a Bright Brighter Day"
- "Two Heads Ain't Better Than One" (Performed by Fice and Edil)
- "When you Lose to Me" (Performed by Antonim)
- "It's what I've been Searching For"
