= Tommy Cook (actor) =

American actor (born 1930)

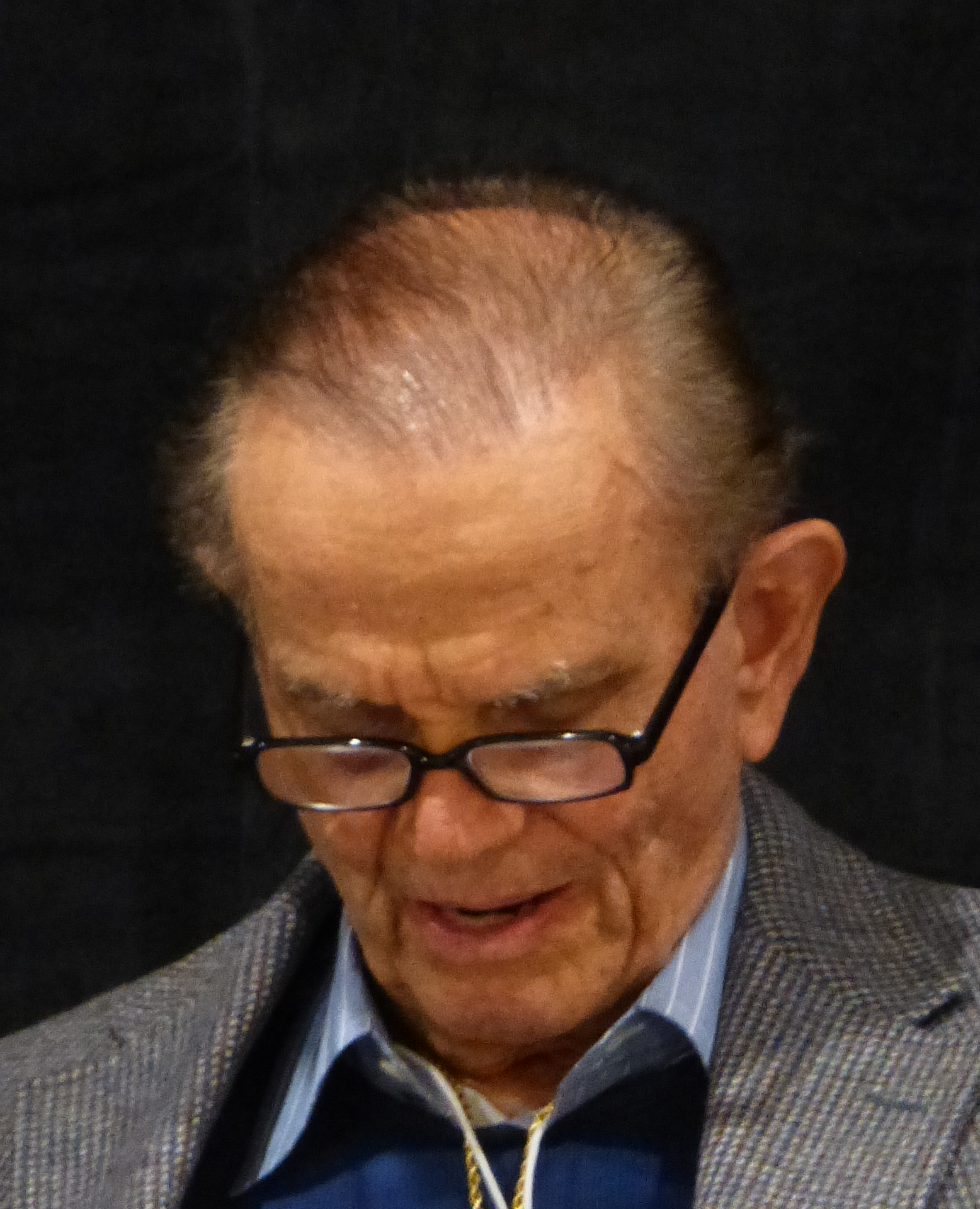
- Cook in 2015
- Born: July 5, 1930 (age 96); Duluth, Minnesota, U.S.
- Education: UCLA
- Occupations: Actor, producer, screenwriter, visionary
- Years active: 1937–present

Tommy Cook (born July 5, 1930) is an American actor, producer and screenwriter. He came up with the story for the 1977 American disaster-suspense film Rollercoaster, starring George Segal. Cook also voiced Augie Anderson and Biff on Hanna-Barbera's animated series The Funky Phantom and Jabberjaw.

== Film ==
Cook played a villainous tribesboy opposite Johnny Weissmuller in Tarzan and the Leopard Woman, a "nice native lad" in Jungle Girl (a serial), and Little Beaver in the serial version of Adventures of Red Ryder.

He would later help write and produce Rollercoaster, as well as Players, starring Ali MacGraw.

== Radio and television ==
Cook started his career on radio. He played Little Beaver on the radio series Red Ryder. He also played Alexander on Blondie and Junior on The Life of Riley. He had a starring role in the 1950 American drama film The Vicious Years.

On television, Cook appeared in a 1961 episode of The Tab Hunter Show. He had voice-over roles on animated series such as Kid Flash on The Superman/Aquaman Hour of Adventure, Augie on The Funky Phantom and Biff on Jabberjaw.

Cook returned to acting in 2017, making guest appearances on Better Things and Space Force. This means that his acting career in Hollywood now spans over 80 years.

== Military service ==
In the 1950s, Cook was a corporal in the U.S. Marine Corps.

== Filmography ==
=== Film ===
Year	Title	Role
1940	Adventures of Red Ryder	Little Beaver
1941	Mr. District Attorney	Newspaper Boy
1941	Jungle Girl	Kimbu
1942	The Tuttles of Tahiti	Riki
1943	Hi, Buddy	Spud Winslow
1943	Good Luck, Mr. Yates	Johnny Zaloris
1944	Mr. Winkle Goes to War	Barry
1944	The Suspect	Child violinist
1945	Wanderer of the Wasteland	Young Chito
1945	A Thousand and One Nights	Salim
1945	The Gay Senorita	Paco
1945	Strange Holiday	Tommy, the newsboy
1946	Tarzan and the Leopard Woman	Kimba
1946	Song of Arizona	Chip Blaine
1946	Gallant Journey	Cutty
1946	Humoresque	Young Phil Boray
1947	The Homestretch	Pablo Artigo
1948	Michael O'Halloran	Joey
1948	Cry of the City	Tony Rome
1949	Daughter of the West	Ponca
1949	Bad Boy	Floyd
1949	The Kid from Cleveland	Dan Hudson
1950	The Vicious Years	Mario
1950	Panic in the Streets	Vince Poldi
1950	American Guerrilla in the Philippines	Miguel
1952	Rose of Cimarron	Young Willie
1952	The Battle at Apache Pass	Little Elk
1953	Stalag 17	Prisoner of war
1953	Clipped Wings	Recruit
1954	Thunder Pass	Rogers
1955	Battle Cry	Cpl. Zilch
1955	Canyon Crossroads	Mickey Rivers
1955	Teen-Age Crime Wave	Mike Denton
1956	Mohawk	Keoga
1957	Night Passage	Howdy Sladen
1958	High School Hellcats	Freddie
1958	Missile to the Moon	Gary Fennell
1959	Alaska Passage	Hubie
1962	When the Girls Take Over	Razmo
1964	Send Me No Flowers	Paul Pendergrass
1971	The Gatling Gun	Pvt. Elwood
1972	The Thing with Two Heads	Priest

=== Television ===
Year	Title	Role
1961	The Lawless Years	Joey Valenti (S3 E18 "The Jonathan Wills Story")
1967–1968	The Superman/Aquaman Hour of Adventure	Wally West / Kid Flash (voice)
1967–1970	Aquaman	Wally West / Kid Flash (voice)
1968–1969	The New Adventures of Huckleberry Finn	Additional voices
1968	The Banana Splits Adventure Hour	Mike Carter (voice)
1971–1972	The Funky Phantom	Augie Anderson (voice)
1973–1975	Jeannie	S. Melvin Farthinghill (voice)
1976	Jabberjaw	Biff (voice)
1977	CB Bears	Additional voices
1977–1978	Fred Flintstone and Friends	S. Melvin Farthinghill (voice)
2020	Better Things	Old Dude
2020	Space Force	Bob White

=== Radio ===
- Red Ryder
- Blondie
- The Life of Riley
- Lux Radio Theatre
- The Adventures of Ozzie and Harriet
- Arch Oboler's Plays
- Yours Truly, Johnny Dollar
- A Date With Judy

== Bibliography ==
- Holmstrom, John. The Moving Picture Boy: An International Encyclopaedia from 1895 to 1995, Norwich, Michael Russell, 1996, p. 169. ISBN 0859551784.
