= The Vicious Years =

1950 film

- Directed by: Robert Florey
- Written by: N. Richard Nash
- Produced by: Anson Bond
- Starring: Tommy Cook; Eduard Franz; Gar Moore
- Cinematography: Henry Freulich
- Edited by: Fred Allen
- Music by: Arthur Lange
- Production company: Emerald Productions
- Distributed by: Film Classics
- Release date: 10 March 1950
- Running time: 81 minutes
- Country: United States
- Language: English

The Vicious Years is a 1950 American crime drama film directed by Robert Florey and starring Tommy Cook, Eduard Franz and Gar Moore.

== Plot ==
Italian war orphan Mario witnesses Luca Rossi committing a murder. Eager for a home and family life, Mario promises not to inform the police if Luca will take him into his household and family. Luca fears and hates Mario, but his father, mother and sister all come to love him. Afraid that Mario will reveal his secret, Luca attempts to kill him. Emilio Rossi realizes that his son is evil and surrenders him to the police. Mario is persuaded to stay with the family as an adopted son.

== Cast ==
- Tommy Cook as Mario
- Sybil Merritt as Dina Rossi
- Eduard Franz as Emilio Rossi
- Gar Moore as Luca Rossi
- Anthony Ross as Inspector Umberto Spezia
- Marjorie Eaton as Zia Lola
- Russ Tamblyn as Tino
- Eve Miller as Giulia
- Lester Sharpe as Matteo
- John Doucette as Giorgio
