= Canyon Crossroads =

1955 film by Alfred L. Werker

- Theatrical film poster
- Directed by: Alfred L. Werker
- Written by: Laurence Heath; Emmett Murphy
- Produced by: William F. Joyce; Thomas Whitesell; Alfred L. Werker
- Starring: Richard Basehart; Phyllis Kirk; Stephen Elliott
- Cinematography: Gordon Avil
- Edited by: Dave Kummins; Chester W. Schaeffer
- Music by: George Bassman
- Production company: Motion Picture Techniques
- Distributed by: United Artists
- Release date: April 11, 1955
- Running time: 73 minutes
- Country: United States
- Language: English

Canyon Crossroads is a 1955 American Western film directed by Alfred L. Werker and stars Richard Basehart, Phyllis Kirk and Stephen Elliott.

== Plot ==
Near Moab, Utah, mining engineer Larry Kendall (Richard Basehart) is searching for large uranium deposits and joins forces with Katherine Rand (Phyllis Kirk) and her father, Dr. Andrew Rand (Russell Collins). When Dr. Rand is hurt in an accident, Kendall and Katherine continue on, enlisting the help of an Indian guide, Charlie Rivers (Alan Wells).

Larry realizes Larson (Stephen Elliott), a rival mining engineer, has sent Pete Barnwell (Charles Wagenheim) to trail them. After finding uranium ore in a series of caverns, they send Charlie back with ore samples to take to the Atomic Energy Commission office in Moab, while Larry and Kathy stay behind to protect their claim. While they had been at odds earlier, the pair now realize they are falling in love.

Barnwell finds their location and attacks them, shooting Kathy, and setting off an explosion that seals the entrance to the cavern. Knowing that Charlie has ore samples, Barnwell kills him in an ambush and steals the samples.

In the morning, when Kathy sees bats returning, they both realize that there is a small opening that at least Larry can climb through. Finding a horse that they had tied up, Larry heads off to town, but Barnwell is already at the Atomic Energy Commission office, plotting to turn the samples in for himself, when Larson shows up.

The two thieves employ a helicopter to get back to the mine where Kathy is still trapped. While Barnwell is left to guard the cavern entrance, Larson takes to his helicopter to chase down Larry. When Charlie's brothers find his body, Joe (Richard Hale) and Mickey Rivers (Tommy Cook), follow his tracks to the cavern where Joe forces a confession from Barnwell and kills him.

The two Rivers brothers set out for Moab and find Larry on the way who tells them that Kathy is wounded and trapped. The group gets back to the cavern just as Larson returns. In the ensuing shootout, Larry kills Larson, then radios in for help. With the rescue service on its way, Larry and Kathy comfort each other.

== Cast ==
- Richard Basehart as Larry Kendall
- Phyllis Kirk as Katherine Rand
- Stephen Elliott as Larson
- Russell Collins as Dr. Andrew Rand
- Richard Hale as Joe Rivers
- Charles Wagenheim as Pete Barnwell
- Alan Wells as Charlie Rivers
- Tommy Cook as Mickey Rivers
- William Pullen as Harry—AEC Clerk

== Production ==
Canyon Crossroads was set in and near Moab, Utah, with 90% of the production shot entirely on location in 1954 at Professor Valley and along the Colorado River. Moab locations, the site of many previous Hollywood productions, were employed, although "no sets were constructed".

== Reception ==
Film historians Jack Hardwick and Ed Schnepf described Canyon Crossroads as "fair entertainment", claiming that the film "... was the first good guys-bad guys helicopter chase picture." A Bell 47 helicopter was featured in the film.

== See also ==
- List of American films of 1955
