= List of Lights Out episodes =

Lights Out is an American horror radio program, which ran on various networks from January 1934 to the summer of 1947. Due to a number of recordings being lost, along with syndication having re-edited intros and the titles of broadcasts changing frequently, it may be impossible to ever compile a full list.

Please note that this does not include episodes for the television adaption, and only includes the radio show.

== 1936 ==
Title	Air Date	Alternate Title	Listen	Summary
1. Burial Service	36/06/10			A paralyzed girl believed to be dead is buried alive.
2. Cat Wife	36/06/17			After a man calls his amoral wife a cat, an incredible transformation follows.
3. The Dictator	36/06/24			A scientist attempts to murder a dictator in a diving bell down in the deep dark sea.
4. Midnight Flame	36/07/01			
5.	36/07/08			
6. The Flame	36/07/15			A man obsessed with fire uses an incantation to summon a she-demon.
7.	36/07/22			
8. The Sea	36/07/29			A jealous Irish miscreant plots his brother's death.
9. Money, Money, Money	36/08/05			A sailor wins $3,000.
10. Across the Gap	36/08/12			A car crash sends a couple and their driver into the prehistoric past.
11. Invitation to a Fly	36/08/19			The story of a human spider set in a lonely Scottish inn.
12. Danse Macabre	36/08/26			At his son's grave a famous composer meets a violinist who tries to persuade him to kill himself.
13. The Last War	36/09/02			A world war of the future brings devastating destruction with gas bombs. Those who have died return to take revenge upon the man responsible.
14. The Author and the Thing	36/09/09			A writer believes that the horrors he writes about are being brought to life.
15. The Sea	36/09/16			
16. Blue Beard and the Harp	36/09/23			
17. Black Pirate	36/09/30			A modern day luxury yacht cruise is interrupted when pirates suddenly board the ship. Although the year is in the 1930s, the pirates act as if they came from another century.
18. Eagle's Return	36/10/07			An aviator attempts to fly around the world with his sponsor.
19. The Fast One	36/10/14			A murderer develops a serum that, in the end, produces horrific results.
20. The Thing That Crept	36/10/21			A synthetic monster created by gem thieves climbs up a 45 story building with its vacuum-cup feet into a penthouse.
21. Halloween Horror	36/10/28			A gang of small boys go out on Halloween night to create mischief and encounter something they didn't expect.
22. Death Prayer	36/11/04			Bushmen in Australia carry out a "prayer ceremony" with results that follow a cruel scientist back to England.
23. Crime Clique of Croesus	36/11/11			A group of men join together to commit perfect crimes for the thrill of it.
24. Alter Ego	36/11/18			A woman with a split personality battles her inner negative self as she waits on death row.
25. Tong	36/11/25			A big city racketeer decides to organize the laundries of his bailiwick into a "protective association". He also decides to include Chinese hand laundries in his organization.
26. War Horse	36/12/02			An old war horse who saw service in the World War seeks revenge.
27. Nobody Died	36/12/09			An old dying woman is given a rejuvenation potion, but the dictatorial government wants it.
28. Poltergeist	36/12/16	(The Gravestone)		A hike through a snow-covered graveyard leads to the rise of a poltergeist...and murder.
29. Afternoon of a Faun	36/12/23			A story inspired by Debussy's music of the same name.
30. Murder Below	36/12/30			

== 1937 ==
Title	Air Date	Alternate Title	Listen	Summary
31. Sir Rat	37/01/06			A mad nobleman entombs women of his court in the middle ages.
32. Devil in White	37/01/13			A doctor discovers a method for grafting human limbs from one body to another.
33. Beast of the Shamo	37/01/20			
34. Big Sock	37/01/27			
35. The Honeymoon	37/02/03			
36. Acrophobia	37/02/10			
37. Cat Wife (Repeat)	37/02/17			After a man calls his amoral wife a cat; an incredible transformation follows.
38. Buried in 1826	37/02/24			The story of a young girl whose body, buried in 1826 through a chemical freak, has become a sideshow exhibit at a traveling carnival.
39. Sakhalin	37/03/03			The prison camp commandant on a remote Russian island has murderous plans for an inspector.
40. Chicken Heart	37/03/10			A chicken heart begins to grow, and there's no end in sight.
41. State Executioner	37/03/17			In Georgian England, a man is an executioner for the state, for which he feels no remorse.
42. The Thirteenth Corpse	37/03/24			
43. Homus Primus	37/03/31	(Across the Gap)		A car crash sends a couple and their driver into the prehistoric past.
44. Ivan, the Terrible	37/04/07			
45. The Little People	37/04/14			A disgruntled scientist enacts a horrific revenge against his ex-wife and her lover.
46. Ghost Party	37/04/21			A party where the hosts hold a seance in jest has a guest they never expected.
47. The Ninth Life	37/04/28			
48. I, Madman	37/05/05			A man who'd give anything to know the future actually travels one year into the future...and learns more than he bargained for.
49. Organ	37/05/12			A family rents a creepy old house.
50. Mad World	37/05/19			In a totalitarian future, the dying Leader plans to use an elixir to make the entire world insane.
51. Until Dead	37/05/26			A man framed for a murder will stop at nothing for revenge - not even his enemy's already being dead.
52. Snake Woman	37/06/02			
53. Forty Seventh Street Precinct	37/06/09			
54. Meteor Man	37/06/16			A couple find a meteorite — and encounter the horror inside it.
55. Happy Ending	37/06/23			A young wife learns that she's pregnant...how's she going to tell her husband and how will he take it?
56. The Cave	37/06/30			Two girls visiting Carlsbad Caverns try playing a joke that doesn't prove very funny.
57. Brain Wave	37/07/07			
58. Lord Marley's Guest	37/07/14			Lord Marley and his female "guest" have evil plans for the lord's wife.
59. Glacier Woman	37/09/29			
60. Escape	37/10/06			
61. Black Zombie	37/10/13			
62. The Deep	37/10/20			
63. Pyramid	37/10/27			After an archeologist’s daughter marries she and her new husband go to Egypt to visit her father’s dig site. Meanwhile, the new husband has broken the bone watch of his father in law which produces horrifying results
64. Four Husbands	37/11/03			
65. Compound Interest	37/11/10			
66. Little Old Lady	37/11/17			A girl and her friend travel to visit her aunt, whom she's not seen for many years.
67. Tin Soldier	37/11/24			
68. Death Pit	37/12/01			A man steps through a door and suddenly finds himself in a prehistoric world.
69. The Flame	37/12/08			A man obsessed with fire uses an incantation to summon a she-demon.
70. Studio Apartment	37/12/15			A worried married couple go looking for their missing daughter and their search brings them to a creepy studio apartment
71. Uninhabited (Christmas Story - 1918)	37/12/22			Three soldiers during the Great War experience the same dream while on a train.
72. The Dark	37/12/29			A doctor and a police investigator are called to an abandoned house—with horrific results. (Note: Considered lost, it is primarily remembered for being the basis of a sketch in The Simpsons episode Treehouse of Horror V.)

== 1938 ==
Title	Air Date	Alternate Title	Listen	Summary
73. Genghis Khan	38/01/05			
74.	38/01/12			
75. Seven Women	38/01/19			
76. Oxychloride X	38/01/26			A rebuffed college student decides to create something entirely new—and unstoppable.
77. Death Letter	38/02/02			
78. Screen Test	38/02/09			The story of one movie actor and seven mysterious old women in an out-of-the-way hotel.
79. Murder Castle	38/02/16			Women who enter this house never come out. One victim's sister learns the horrifying secret.
80. Chicken Heart	38/02/23			A chicken heart begins to grow, and there's no end in sight.
81. Mother-In-Law	38/03/02	(Knock at the Door)		A shrewish wife wants to be rid of her hateful mother-in-law, but will she ever really be?
82. The Ball	38/03/09			Two male students crash a masked ball in Paris.
83. Superfeature	38/03/16			A traveling shower of motion pictures who's also a crook shows a particular film once too often.
84. The Dream	38/03/23	(Darrell Hall's Thoughts) (Kill)		A professor keeps having a nightmare that urges him to kill.
85. Valse Triste	38/03/30			Two women canoeing in the woods come across a dark house with a sinister occupant.
86. Cat Wife	38/04/06			After a man calls his amoral wife a cat; an incredible transformation follows.
87. Three Matches	38/04/13			
88. Night on the Mountain	38/04/20			
89. They Died	38/04/27			
90. Devil's Island	38/05/04			
91. It Happened	38/05/11	(Her Name Was Jean) (Call Her Jean)		A young woman in Paris is kidnapped and taken into the sewers, where she escapes only to meet a worse fate.
92. Good, Bad, Indifferent	38/05/18			
93. Mrs Crazy	38/05/25			
94. Scoop	38/06/01			A new newspaper owner purges his staff, only to find out how bad an idea it was.
95. Spider	38/06/08			Two men in the jungle search for a giant spider.
96. The Thirteenth Corpse (Repeat)	38/06/15			
97. Bon Voyage	38/06/22			Two sisters with an ugly secret take a cruise on an empty ship.
98. The Chest	38/06/29			A meek husband buys a supposedly empty chest at an auction.
99. Gevancenpoort	38/07/06			A husband and wife are trapped in an infamous Dutch prison and tortured by ghosts.
100. The Peacock Shrieks	38/07/13			
101. The Hounds of War	38/07/20			
102.	38/07/27			
103. Homecoming (pre-empted)	38/10/12			
104. Ghost Operator	38/10/26			
105. The Living Death	38/11/02			A man is forced to listen, through his coffin, to his own funeral service.
106. Legion of the Dead	38/11/09			
107. The Ring	38/11/16			A dead man haunts a former lover.
108. The Hand Of Eternity	38/11/23			
109. The Bride of Madness	38/11/30			
110. Battle Of The Magicians	38/12/07			An occult detective is hired to investigate a possibly supernatural plane crash.
111. Queen Cobra	38/12/14			A scientist may learn more than he expected on a trip to India.
112. Hindu Revenge	38/12/21			Do you believe in reincarnation? In wartime, anything is possible.
113. The Theater	38/12/28			

== 1939 ==
Title	Air Date	Alternate Title	Listen	Summary
114. Cat Pit	39/01/04			
115. Reunion	39/01/11			
116. The Stage Is Set for Murder	39/01/18			Life on the stage can be murder...especially for a magician.
117. Two Voices Has The Devil	39/01/25			
118. Bark of a Dead Dog	39/02/01			
119. The Living Dead	39/02/08			
120. Jericho	39/02/15			
121. The Survivor	39/02/22			A fire at sea leaves only one survivor...this is his story.
122. Satan's Orchid	39/03/01			
123. One Day It Rained Blood	39/03/08			The last man on Earth tells his chilling tale.
124. Profits Unlimited	39/03/15			A young woman inherits an island with an unusual business located on it.
125. Dilu	39/03/22			Another tale of how it doesn't pay to mess with the spirit world.
126. Wandering Egyptian	39/03/29			
127. The Blood of the Gorilla	39/04/05			
128. Fear	39/04/12			
129. The Phantom Meteor	39/04/19			
130. The Devil's Due	39/04/26			Two killers on the run meet a mysterious man in a warehouse who knows all about them.
131. The Retribution of Edward Scurr	39/05/03			
132. The Curse of the Kiba	39/05/10			
133.	39/05/17			
134. Beetles	39/05/24			Another tale of science gone wrong, this time with human-sized beetles.
135.	39/05/31			
136. Vendetta	39/06/07			
137. Alley Cat	39/06/14			
138.	39/06/21			
139. Macbeth	39/06/28			
140. Through a Murderer's Eyes	39/07/05			
141. The China Doll	39/07/12			
142. Murder Mind	39/07/19			A college boy's prank doesn't go quite the way he planned.
143. The Giggler	39/07/26			An insane man uses surgery to change his victims' characteristics.
144.	39/08/02			
145. Serenade of Death	39/08/09			
146. The Day of the Four	39/08/16			

== 1941 ==
Title	Air Date	Alternate Title	Listen	Summary
147. Special to Hollywood	41/02/17			A party of film celebrities on board a plane are literally left hanging in mid-air because of their own callousness.

== 1942 ==
Title	Air Date	Alternate Title	Listen	Summary
1. What the Devil	42/10/06			A dynamite truck keeps blocking the path of a couple's car.
2. Revolt of the Worms	42/10/13			A growth chemical is spilled on the ground, with monstrous results.
3. Poltergeist	42/10/20	(Gravestone)		A hike through a snow-covered graveyard leads to the rise of a poltergeist...and murder.
4. Mungahra	42/10/27	(The House Is Haunted)		A man in Australia kills a native, who curses him.
5. Across the Gap	42/11/03	(Neanderthal)		A car crash sends a couple and their driver into the prehistoric past.
6. Bon Voyage	42/11/10			Two sisters with an ugly secret take a cruise on an empty ship.
7. Come to the Bank	42/11/17			A man uses his mind to walk through a wall at the bank.
8. Chicken Heart	42/11/24			A chicken heart begins to grow, and there's no end in sight.
9. The Story of Mister Maggs	42/12/01	(The Chest)		A meek husband buys a supposedly empty chest at an auction.
10. Scoop	42/12/08	(Cemetery)		A new newspaper owner purges his staff, only to find out how bad an idea it was.
11. Knock at the Door	42/12/15			A shrewish wife wants to be rid of her hateful mother-in-law, but will she ever really be?
12. Meteor Man	42/12/22	(The Hungry Ones)		A couple find a meteorite - and encounter the horror inside it.
13. Valse Triste	42/12/29			Two women canoeing in the woods come across a dark house with a sinister occupant.

== 1943 ==
Title	Air Date	Alternate Title	Listen	Summary
14. The Fast One	43/01/05	(Speed)		A man has a potion to make a ‘fast’ buck and finds a partner.
15. The Mirror	43/01/12			
16. Cat Wife	43/01/19			After a man calls his amoral wife a cat, an incredible transformation follows.
17. The Projective Mr Drogen	43/01/26	(Big Mr Little)		After drinking a new cocktail, a man finds he has a new deadly power.
18. Until Dead	43/02/02	(The Luck of Mark Street)		A man framed for a murder will stop at nothing for revenge - not even his enemy's already being dead.
19. He Dug It Up	43/02/09			In his garden in Britain, a man discovers a Roman sarcophagus containing the goddess Sekhmet.
20. Oxychloride X	43/02/16	(Hole, The)		
21. They Met at Dorset	43/02/23			During WW II, two German commandos parachute into England and end up in a mysterious house.
22. The Sea	43/03/02			
23. The Ball	43/03/09	(Paris Macabre)		Two male students crash a masked ball in Paris.
24. The Dream	43/03/16			
25. The Flame	43/03/23			
26. Money, Money, Money	43/03/30	(Three Thousand Dollars)		A sailor wins $3,000.
27. Superfeature	43/04/06	(Familiar, Suddenly Unfamiliar)		A traveling shower of motion pictures who's also a crook shows a particular film once too often.
28. Archer	43/04/13	(Ancestor)		A young woman being held prisoner receives some unexpected help.
29. Kill	43/04/20	(The Dream)(Darrell Hall's Thoughts)		A college professor is driven to murder by a recurring hallucination.
30. Execution	43/04/27			A Nazi execution squad keeps trying to execute the same woman over and over again.
31. Heavenly Jeep	43/05/04			The jeep two Allied soldiers are riding in hits a landmine, but they escape unhurt...or do they?
32. Murder in the Script Department	43/05/11			Two secretaries find writing a script for Lights Out more horrifying than they expected.
33. Spider	43/05/18			Two men search the jungle for a giant spider.
34. Little Old Lady	43/05/25	(Mrs Kingsley's Report)		A girl and her friend travel to visit her aunt, whom she's not seen for many years.
35. Ugliest Man in the World	43/06/01	(Mr Freak)		A man is so ugly that children scream in fright and even his mother's life is unbearable.
36. Organ	43/06/08	(Vacation with Death)		A family rents a creepy old house.
37. Prelude to Murder	43/06/15			
38. Nature Study	43/06/22			Four tourists are trapped in a canyon by a rockslide.
39. Bathysphere	43/06/29	(The Dictator)		A dictator and a scientist travel to the bottom of the sea in a diving bell.
40. The Cliff	43/07/06			A woman finally gets her chance for revenge on the gangster who killed the man she loved.
41. Visitor from Hades	43/07/13			A quarreling couple are trapped in their apartment with a hideous creature that only they can see.
42. Profits Unlimited	43/07/20			A young woman inherits an island with an unusual business located on it.
43. Little People	43/07/27	(Shrinking People)		A disgruntled scientist enacts horrific revenge on his ex-wife and her lover.
44. Murder Castle	43/08/03			Women who enter this house never come out. One victim's sister learns the horrifying secret.
45. Sakhalin	43/08/10			The prison camp commandant on a remote Russian island has murderous plans for an inspector.
46. State Executioner	43/08/17	(Official Killer)		In Georgian England, a man is an executioner for the state, for which he feels no remorse.
47. Sub-Basement	43/08/24	(Going Down)		A man and his wife find something unexpected deep below the department store where he works.
48. Immortal Gentleman	43/08/31	(Live Forever)		A man so obsessed with death that he never really lives travels to a future with no death.
49. Lord Marley's Guest	43/09/07	(Hollywood Visitor)		Lord Marley and his female "guest" have evil plans for the lord's wife.
50. The Word	43/09/14			A newlywed couple in New York City suddenly find themselves the last two people on Earth.
51. Mirage	43/09/21			A man and woman walking along a beach encounter a mysterious figure.
52. The Author and the Thing	43/09/28			A writer believes that the horrors he writes about are being brought to life.

== 1945 ==
Title	Air Date	Alternate Title	Listen	Summary
The Truth	45/06/28			
Story About Two Safe Crackers	45/07/14			
Reunion After Death	45/07/21			
The Rocket Ship	45/07/28			A show incorrectly circulating as Lights Out 45/7/28 The Rocket Ship is from a different series and date, Arch Oboler's Plays 45/09/20 Rocket from Manhattan. It has a Lights Out opening spliced onto it, but is not a Lights Out program. Note: This episode mentions the atomic bombings of Hiroshima and Nagasaki.
The Lady From The Lake	45/08/04			
Did The Murder Happen?	45/08/11			The midnight adventures of a newlywed couple stalled on a lonely road.
Pre-empted	45/08/18			
Man In The Middle	45/08/25			A man finds himself emotionally trapped between his wife and the secretary he's having an affair with.
The Day the Sun Exploded	45/09/01			In a possible future, the entire Earth is about to declare world peace with the abandonment of all borders and the creation of a United Nations World Government. This episode is unique in that it is only 15 minutes long. It was released the day before the Allies declared victory in World War II. In it, delegations of all nations of the world including France, Japan, and Germany all surrender their own individual Sovereignty. Interestingly, the German Delegation exclaims that the nation has come to realize that the German Blood alone does not contain Leadership, but the human vein of the world does.

== 1946 ==
Title	Air Date	Alternate Title	Listen	Summary
1. The Seven Plovers	46/07/06			A young Jew mocks Christ's crucifixion and is condemned to wander the world forever.
2. The Coffin in Studio B	46/07/13			A particularly difficult Lights Out rehearsal is interrupted.
3. Haunted Cell	46/07/20			A cop killer is forced to stay in a cell supposedly haunted by another cop killer who has already been executed.
4. Battle of the Magicians	46/07/27			An occult detective investigates a possibly supernatural plane crash.
5. The Revenge of India	46/08/03			A British officer avenges the murder of his brother.
6. Ghost on the Newsreel Negative	46/08/10			Two reporters visit a haunted farm to interview a ghost.
7. A Case of Self-Conviction	46/08/17	(The Dillinger Complex)		
8. The Signal Man	46/08/24			A railway employee thinks he's being haunted.

== 1947 ==
Title	Air Date	Alternate Title	Listen	Summary
1.	47/07/09			
2. Death Robbery	47/07/16			
3. The Undead	47/07/23			
4. The Ring	47/07/30			
5.	47/08/06			
