= Strange Holiday (1945 film) =

1948 film by Arch Oboler

- Theatrical poster for the film
- Directed by: Arch Oboler
- Written by: Arch Oboler (radio play and screenplay)
- Starring: Claude Rains
- Cinematography: Robert L. Surtees
- Edited by: Fred R. Feitshans Jr.
- Production companies: Elite Pictures; General Motors
- Distributed by: Producers Releasing Corporation
- Release date: October 19, 1945
- Running time: 61 minutes
- Country: United States
- Language: English

Strange Holiday is a 1945 American movie directed by Arch Oboler. Claude Rains features as a man who returns from a fishing vacation to find America controlled by fascists.

Introductory material included with the video release of this movie states that it was underwritten by General Motors corporation and was shown initially in private screenings for the corporation's employees.

Martin Kosleck, a German actor who had played a Nazi or Nazi sympathizer in numerous American movies during the Second World War, is featured prominently as a local authority of the new oppressive regime. The new government makes prominent and continual use of an emblem consisting of two crossed swords over two fascist bundles (a bundle of rods with an axe: the pre-Nazi symbol for fascism) in much the way the Swastika had been employed by Nazi Germany.

== Plot ==
The story is told as a flashback of Stevenson, who is being tortured in a chair, reflecting how he got there.

Stevenson and three children decorate the Christmas tree on Christmas Eve. Then, he is flying in his friend's small plane to a fishing and camping holiday with an old friend in a remote area. Afterwards, they head home on Friday the 13th. Flying back, the plane develops problems and they crash-land in a field in a remote location. At the farmhouse, the farmer refuses to let them in and use the phone. A truck driver also acts oddly but gives Stevenson a lift into his town for $20. The driver also declines to explain his hostile behaviour. The main street is devoid of people. Stevenson meets Miss Simms, his secretary, but she does not want to talk. When he goes to his office, it is deserted. He meets the building manager, Regan, who says they thought Stevenson was dead, but will not explain why the business is not operating.

Stevenson goes to his house and cannot find his wife and children there. Two men grab him; when he refuses to go with them he is coshed. He awakes in jail, where another prisoner gives him water and tells him that the American Constitution has been changed by those now in charge. Stevenson is called to an examiner to explain where he has been and who he has met. He is refused a lawyer. He is tied to a table and beaten. The examiner then explains the new America: no religion; no free speech; punishment for non-conformity. Stevenson is declared an enemy of the state. In his cell, he ponders on this new world order. When he sleeps, he dreams of an alternative future and sees a picnic with another family; his daughter has grown up and is being courted. When he wakes, he decides he does not want to keep living in this new world.

The scene then fades out to Stevenson waking from a nap while still camping with his friend. The whole story was a bad dream.

== Cast ==
- Claude Rains as John Stevenson
- Bobbie Stebbins as John Stevenson Jr.
- Barbara Bates as Peggy Lee Stevenson
- Paul Hilton as Woodrow Stevenson Jr.
- Gloria Holden as Mrs. Jean Stevenson
- Milton Kibbee as Sam Morgan
- Walter White Jr. as Farmer
- Wally Maher as Truck Driver
- Tommy Cook as Tommy, the Newsboy
- Griff Barnett as Regan
- Ed Max as First Detective
- Paul Dubov as Second Detective
- Helen Mack as Miss Simms his Secretary
- Martin Kosleck as Examiner
- Charles McAvoy as Guard
- Priscilla Lyons as Betty
- David Bradford as Boy Friend
- Uncredited African American actor as "Nobody", a prisoner
