= Gar Moore =

American actor (1920–1985

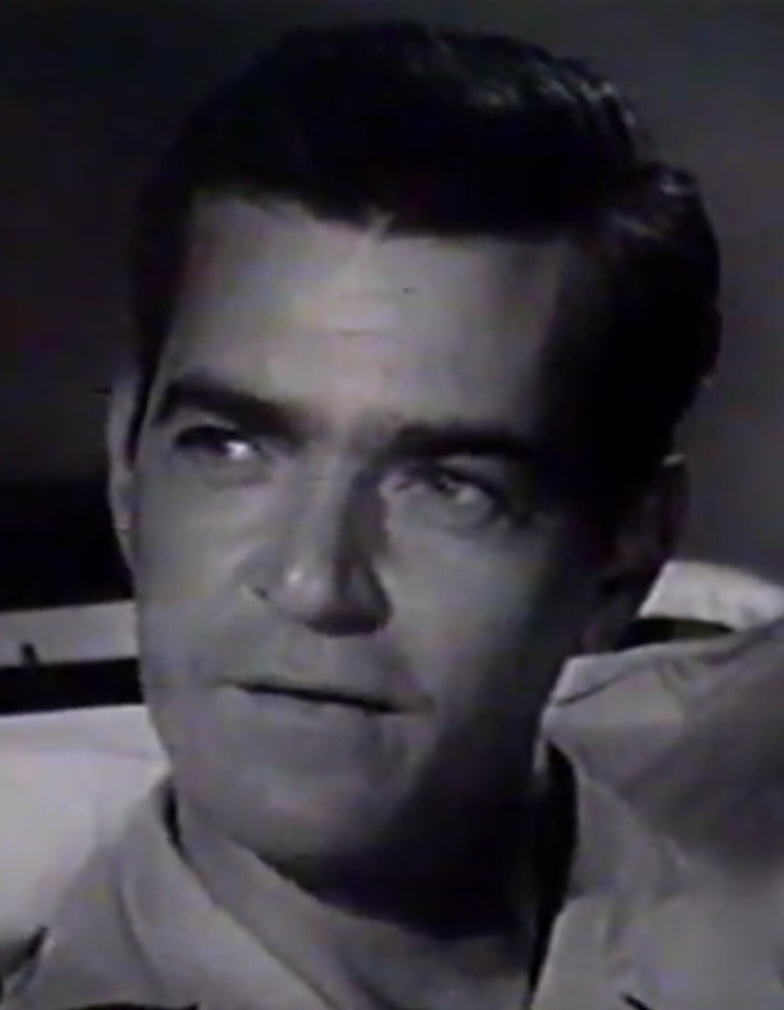
- Moore in an episode of Lock-Up (1959)
- Born: Joseph Garland Moore Jr. September 4, 1920; Chelsea, Oklahoma, U.S.
- Died: November 3, 1985 (aged 65); Loma Linda, California, U.S.
- Occupation: Actor
- Years active: 1944–1959
- Spouse: Nancy Walker (m. 1948; div. 1949)

Joseph Garland "Gar" Moore Jr. (September 4, 1920 – November 3, 1985) was an American actor in Italian and American films. He was also in several theatrical productions.

He was born in Chelsea, Oklahoma. He had a short marriage to Nancy Walker.

== Filmography ==
- Rome, Free City (1946)
- Paisan (1946)
- To Live in Peace (1947) as Ronald
- Johnny Stool Pigeon (1949) as Sam Harrison
- Illegal Entry (1949) as Lee Sloan
- Abbott and Costello Meet the Killer, Boris Karloff (1949) as Jeff Wilson
- The Underworld Story (1950) as Clark Stanton
- The Vicious Years (1950) as Luca Rossi
- The Girl in White (1952)
- Curse of the Faceless Man (1958) as Dr. Enrico Ricci

== Shows ==
- Bells Are Ringing at the Sacramento Music Circus
