= Oboler Comedy Theater =

Early American comedy TV program

Arch Oboler's Comedy Theater is an early American comedy television program. It aired on ABC for six episodes from September 23 to November 4, 1949. It was an anthology series of sorts, with each episode featuring a different set of characters. At least one episode consisted of three unrelated comedy segments. At least some of the episodes exist as kinescope recordings, representing early examples of television comedy.

The program was produced in Hollywood, with people in that area seeing the original telecasts. Kinescopes of those broadcasts were shown on the rest of the network.

== Episodes ==
Broadcast Episodes of Oboler Comedy Theater
| Title | Actors |
|---|---|
| "Ostrich in Bed" | Hans Conried, Ken Christy, Sara Berner, Marna Kennealy, Frances Rafferty, Olan Soule |
| "Love, Love, Love" | Gloria Blondell, Conried, Frances Bates, Jerry Hausner, Olive Deering, Nan Boardman, Lou Merrill, Leo Penn, Benny Rubin. |
| "Lo, the Poor Indian"/"The Laughing Man"/"Mr. Pip" (three short stories) | Merrill, Peter Leeds, Gwen Delano, Griff Barnett, Marna Kenneally, Byron Kane, Danny Richards Jr. |
| "Mr. Dydee" | Ed Max, Sandra Gould |
| "Dog's Eye View" | Deering, Hugh O'Brian, Merrill, Marian Richman |
| "Mrs. Kingsley's Report" | (Unknown) |

The reference book Encyclopedia of Television Miniseries, 1936-2020 says, "'Mrs. Kingsley's Report' is believed not to have been filmed."

== See also ==
- Arch Oboler's Plays - radio series
