= All in a Night's Work (film) =

1961 film

- Theatrical release poster
- Directed by: Joseph Anthony
- Screenplay by: Edmund Beloin; Maurice Richlin; Sidney Sheldon
- Story by: Owen Elford (play); Margit Veszi
- Produced by: Hal Wallis
- Starring: Dean Martin< Shirley MacLaine; Cliff Robertson; Charles Ruggles
- Cinematography: Joseph LaShelle
- Edited by: Howard A. Smith
- Music by: André Previn
- Production company: Wallis-Hazen
- Distributed by: Paramount Pictures
- Release date: March 22, 1961
- Running time: 94 minutes
- Country: United States
- Language: English
- Box office: $2.2 million

All in a Night's Work is a 1961 American Technicolor romantic screwball comedy film directed by Joseph Anthony and starring Dean Martin and Shirley MacLaine.

== Plot ==
Tony Ryder's uncle, the wealthy publisher of magazines, has just died. The young playboy Tony inherits the paper but is left with a board of directors that thinks he's unsuited for the task, plus a hotel detective who thinks Tony should know about a girl who was seen running away from his uncle's Palm Beach hotel room, wearing nothing but a Turkish towel and an earring, on the night of his death.

Tony discovers that the young lady in question, Katie Robbins, is employed in his own research department. The board decrees that he must send in the detective to watch her and head off any attempts at blackmail. But the more time Tony spends trying to get Katie to open up about what her relationship to his uncle was, the less he cares. Complications ensue in the form of Ms. Robbins's fiancé—he's a strait-laced veterinarian—and the board's insistence that Katie be silenced at all costs.

Tony goes as far as kidnapping a dog off the street, so he can gain access to Kingsley's veterinary clinic and size him up. When the dog's muscular owner appears, Tony beats a hasty retreat and leaves Kingsley to take the heat.

When Kingsley's strait-laced parents come to New York to meet Katie, they quickly discover her inability to cook and her low tolerance for alcohol. The father, somewhat henpecked, secretly enjoys a grand tour of Manhattan's nightspots.

Kingsley Jr. is exposed as an unworthy "Mamma's Boy", and Tony demonstrates his loyalty by proposing to Katie in a crowded elevator of strangers.

== Cast ==
- Dean Martin as Tony Ryder
- Shirley MacLaine as Katie Robbins
- Cliff Robertson as Warren Kingsley, Jr.
- Charles Ruggles as Dr. Warren Kingsley, Sr. (billed as Charlie Ruggles)
- Norma Crane as Marge Coombs
- John Hudson as Harry Lane
- Jerome Cowan as Sam Weaver
- Gale Gordon as Oliver Dunnin
- Ralph Dumke as Baker
- Mabel Albertson as Mrs. Kingsley
- Rex Evans as Carter
- Mary Treen as Miss Schuster
- Roy Gordon as Albright
- Ian Wolfe as O'Hara
- Gertrude Astor as Customer (uncredited)
- Rosemarie Bowe as Tony's 'Friend' (uncredited)
- Cecil Elliott (uncredited)
- Charles Evans as Colonel Ryder (uncredited)
- Donald Foster (uncredited)
- Jay Girard (uncredited)
- Jasper as The Dog (uncredited)
- Mike Mahoney (uncredited)
- Michael P. Moll (uncredited)
- Florence Ravenel (uncredited)
- Carle Saxe (uncredited)
- Yuki Shimoda as Ryder's House Servant (uncredited)
- Joan Staley (uncredited)
- Dick Wessel (uncredited)
- Jack Weston as Lasker (uncredited)
- Virginia Whitmire (uncredited)
