= The Bubble (1966 film) =

- British quad poster
- Directed by: Arch Oboler
- Written by: Arch Oboler
- Produced by: Marvin J. Chomsky; Arch Oboler
- Starring: Michael Cole; Deborah Walley
- Cinematography: Charles F. Wheeler
- Edited by: Igo Kantor
- Music by: Paul Sawtell; Bert Shefter
- Production company: Midwestern MagicVeurs
- Distributed by: Arch Oboler Productions
- Release dates: December 21, 1966; 1976 (Re-release)
- Running time: 112 minutes (Original release); 93 minutes (1976 re-release)
- Country: United States
- Language: English

The Bubble is a 1966 American 3-D science fiction film in color, later re-released under the title Fantastic Invasion of Planet Earth. It was written and directed by Arch Oboler and starred Michael Cole and Deborah Walley.

== Plot ==
Tony is flying Catherine, who is in labor, and her husband Mark to a local city when a storm forces their small aircraft to land near a small town. Catherine is rushed to a local doctor, who delivers her baby successfully. The town is an odd amalgamation of architectural styles and technology levels, and the people act drugged. There is no wind or rain. Tony's plane goes missing.

Mark and Tony discover a throne-like seat in a building. When Tony sits in the seat, he becomes like the townspeople. Mark locates Tony after some time and knocks him out. When Tony awakes, he's back to his old self.

When the outsiders try to leave, they discover the town is encased in a gigantic clear dome. Mark hypothesizes that aliens are studying the townspeople, and sitting in the rock seat keeps the townspeople alive (as no food is getting in). A massive shadow passes over the town, and a woman and her child are pulled into the air. Hysterical, Catherine hides with her baby in an old mill on the edge of town.

Mark and Tony decide to try to dig a tunnel under the dome. In frustration, Mark takes a sledgehammer to the throne. The shadow passes over and Tony is taken by the aliens. Realizing he has little time left before the aliens come for him, Mark starts frantically digging and finds the bottom of the dome.

The townspeople gather outside the mill, chanting for food. Thinking his family is about to be eaten, Mark gives a speech about freedom. Suddenly, the wind starts blowing and it starts raining. The aliens and the dome are gone.

== Cast ==
- Michael Cole as Mark
- Deborah Walley as Catherine
- Johnny Desmond as Tony Herric
- Kassie McMahon as Doctor
- Barbara Eiler as Talent
- Virginia Gregg as Ticket cashier
- Victor Perrin as Taxi driver
- Olan Soule as Watch repairman
- Chester Jones as Newspaper vendor

== Production ==
The Bubble utilizes many gimmick shots that serve only to showcase the 3-D, which in 1966, after a dozen years' near-total absence from U.S. screens, was once again a novelty interesting in itself. Some gimmicks are marginally plot-related, such as Catherine reaching out to greet her husband, her arms stretching out to the viewer, but many are not. An electrical worker climbs up a power pole, the pole shown from above so that it projects out into the audience. Various objects are thrust out at the viewer. For no logical reason, a tray of beers defies gravity and slowly floats out of the screen to waft about in midair and tantalize the audience for a while before slowly returning. Scenes of vacant-faced townspeople strolling along the sidewalk in a daze while repeatedly opening and closing umbrellas, prolonged beyond any storytelling necessity, are revisited at intervals. Much of this gratuitous footage was trimmed out before later re-releases, unburdening the film of roughly twenty minutes of its original nearly two-hour running time.

== Legacy ==
The Bubble marked the introduction of the economical Space-Vision 3-D system. Unlike the two-camera, two-projector systems used to make and show the 3-D feature films of the 1950s, Space-Vision used a single ordinary movie camera with an external optical attachment that allowed it to simultaneously photograph the left-eye and right-eye views stacked in an "over-and-under" configuration on a single frame of film. Because each image was only half the standard height, this resulted in a widescreen aspect ratio with roughly the same proportions as CinemaScope. A special attachment on the projector allowed the two images to be projected through oppositely oriented polarizing filters and superimposed on a screen provided with a special non-depolarizing surface. As with the feature-length 3-D films of the 1950s, the audience had to wear Polaroid-type 3-D glasses so that each eye would see only the image intended for it. Space-Vision was used for Andy Warhol's Frankenstein (1974), the only widely shown first-run polarized 3-D film of the 1970s. Functionally identical over-and-under systems, branded with various names, were used for most of the films made during a revival of 3-D that began with the release of Comin' at Ya! in 1981.

The Bubble, under its original title, was the feature film in a November 2022 episode of the long-running movie-riffing comedy show Mystery Science Theater 3000. The show's original creator, Joel Hodgson, returned to his original movie theater seat to jibe at the film with his two robot puppets.

== See also ==
- List of American films of 1966
- Under the Dome (TV series)
