= Frank Bresee =

American actor and game designer (1929–2018)

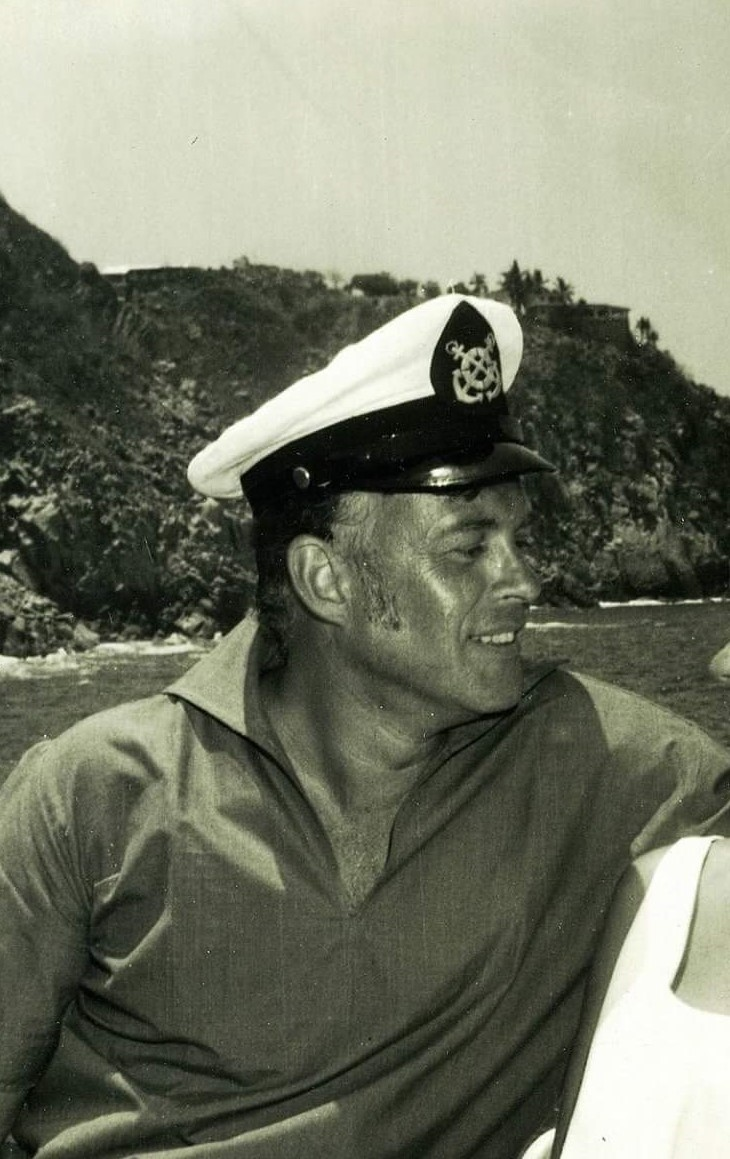
- Frank Bresee in the 70s
- Born: August 20, 1929; Los Angeles, California
- Died: June 5, 2018 (aged 88)
- Occupations: Radio actor and historian, board game designer

Frank Bresee (August 20, 1929 – June 5, 2018) was an American radio actor, radio historian, and board game designer. He hosted the "Golden Days Of Radio" program which began in 1949 and aired on the Armed Forces Radio Network from 1967 to 1995. Bresee also created more than a dozen adult-oriented board games, the most notable of which is the drinking game Pass-Out.

== Background ==
Bresee was born August 20, 1929, in Los Angeles. At age 10, he and his classmates went on a school field trip to the studios of Los Angeles classical music station KFAC. He soon decided he wanted to be in radio. In 1942, he began appearing as "Little Beaver" on the Red Ryder radio program when the regular actor, Tommy Cook, was away working on motion pictures. That same year, Bresee played Alvin on the Major Hopalong program, which also starred Arthur Q. Bryan and Mel Blanc.

== Career ==
Bresee attended hundreds of radio broadcasts and collected scripts, transcription discs and other memorabilia. His tape archives of 3,900 reels is held at the Thousand Oaks Library in Southern California. In August 1949, Bresee launched "Golden Days Of Radio" at CBS' Los Angeles affiliate station KNX, playing transcription discs of old programs. He also often filled in for late-night disc jockey and "Honorary Mayor Of Hollywood" Johnny Grant. In 1950, Bresee began working as an assistant on Bob Hope's weekly NBC radio show.

Bresee also hosted programs on the "Yesterday USA" internet radio station run by Bill Bragg, the former voice of State Fair of Texas mascot Big Tex.

In the 1950s and 1960s, Bresee also worked in television, coordinating prizes for shows such as Let's Make a Deal. Perhaps his most lasting cultural legacy, however, is the board game Pass-Out, which a 2016 story called "essentially Monopoly with booze". The game, first sold in 1962, became very popular later in the decade and in the 1970s. The game is still sold today in many countries around the world, although its U.S. retail presence is now mainly limited to Amazon. While Bresee created more than a dozen other adult-oriented board games, Pass-Out was by far the most successful. In the aforementioned 2016 story, his wife Bobbie, a former Playboy Bunny, said that Pass-Out "bought this house [in Hollywood], it bought a house in Hancock Park, two Rolls-Royces, dozens of trips to Europe and all my opera dresses."

== Death ==
Bresee died June 5, 2018, at age 88.
