= The Twonky =

1953 film by Arch Oboler

- Theatrical release title lobby card
- Directed by: Arch Oboler
- Screenplay by: Arch Oboler
- Based on: "The Twonky" by Henry Kuttner and C. L. Moore
- Produced by: A.D. Nast, Jr. (executive producer); Arch Oboler (producer); Sidney Pink (associate producer)
- Starring: Hans Conried; Gloria Blondell; Billy Lynn; Edwin Max
- Cinematography: Joseph F. Biroc
- Edited by: Betty Steinberg
- Music by: Jack Meakin
- Distributed by: United Artists
- Release date: June 10, 1953
- Running time: 84 minutes
- Country: United States
- Language: English

The Twonky is a 1953 independently made American black-and-white science fiction/comedy film, produced by A.D. Nast, Jr., Arch Oboler, and Sidney Pink, written and directed by Arch Oboler, and starring Hans Conried, Gloria Blondell, Billy Lynn, and Edwin Max. The film was distributed by United Artists.

== Plot ==
After seeing his wife (Janet Warren) off on her trip, Kerry West (Hans Conried), a philosophy teacher at a small-town college goes inside his home to contemplate his new purchase: a television set. Sitting down in his office, he places a cigarette in his mouth and is about to light it when a solid beam of light shoots from the television screen, lighting it for him. Absentmindedly unaware of what has taken place, it is only when the television subsequently lights his pipe that West realizes that his television is behaving abnormally.

West soon discovers that the television can walk and perform a variety of functions, including dishwashing, vacuuming, and card-playing. When the television deliveryman (Edwin Max) returns to settle the bill, the television materializes copies of a five-dollar bill in order to provide payment. Yet the television soon exhibits other, more controlling traits, permitting West only a single cup of coffee and breaking West’s classical music records in favor of military marches to which it dances. After West demonstrates the television to his friend Coach Trout (Billy Lynn), the coach declares the television set to be a “twonky”, the word he used as a child to label the inexplicable.

Trout concludes that the Twonky is actually a robot committed to serving West. When he tests this hypothesis by attempting to kick West, the Twonky paralyzes his leg. After tending to the coach, West attempts to write a lecture on the role of individualism in art, but the Twonky hits him with beams that alter his thoughts and censors his reading. When West attempts to give his lecture the next day, he finds himself unable to do more than ramble on about trivialities. Frustrated, West goes to the store from which his wife had ordered the television and demands that they take it back or exchange it.

Meanwhile, at West’s house, the coach summons members of the college's football team and orders them to destroy the Twonky. West arrives with the television deliveryman and his replacement set, only to find the players passed out in front of the machine. Upon being awakened by West, they appear to be in a hypnotic state mumbling that they have “no complaints,” a condition the Twonky soon inflicts on the deliveryman as well. Upstairs, Trout theorizes that the Twonky is from a future “super state” that uses such machines to control the population, which the Twonky soon demonstrates by walking into the room and altering his mind so that he no longer believes there to be a problem. As the now-fixed Trout attempts to leave, police storm into the house in response to a call made by the device seeking female companionship for West, followed by Treasury men tracking down the bogus $5 bills manufactured by the set. When the law enforcement officers attempt to arrest West, though, the Twonky places all of them in a trance, and they leave without complaint.

Frustrated, West escapes the house and returns drunk, only to have the Twonky return him to sobriety with a light beam. After his wife returns to see a visiting bill collector driven from their home by the machine, West decides to take action. Luring the device into his car, he attempts to crash it by a variety of means but is frustrated by the Twonky’s ability to control the vehicle. Spotting a vehicle parked alongside the road, West pulls over and abandons his car, hitching a ride from the other driver, an elderly Englishwoman. His relief at having escaped is soon negated by the woman’s erratic driving, and by the discovery that the Twonky was able to hide in the trunk. When the Twonky attempts to stop the woman’s reckless driving, it precipitates a crash that destroys itself.

== Cast ==
- Hans Conried as Kerry West
- Janet Warren as Carolyn West
- Billy Lynn as Coach Trout
- Edwin Max as the Television Deliveryman
- Gloria Blondell as the Bill Collector
- Evelyn Beresford as Old Lady Motorist
- Bob Jellison as the TV Shop Owner
- Norman Field as the Doctor
- Stephen Roberts as Head Treasury Agent
- Connie Marshall as Susie
- William Phipps as Student
- Lenore Kingston as Offended Phone Operator #2
- Alice Backes as Offended Phone Operator #1
- Brick Sullivan as Cop
- Florence Ravenel as Nurse

== Production ==
The Twonky was based on the 1942 short story by established science fiction writers Henry Kuttner and C. L. Moore, writing under their joint pseudonym Lewis Padgett. It first was published in September 1942 issue of Astounding Science Fiction. Arch Oboler completed the film in 1951, but it did not find a distributor at the time. After he finished the 3D film Bwana Devil (1952), The Twonky was finally released by United Artists. Hans Conried, a noted character actor later in his career, had his first leading role in the film.

== Reception ==
The Twonky did poorly at the box office; critics saw the poor production values as a major problem. When interviewed in 1970, Hans Conried recalled that he told the producer that The Twonky would probably bomb at the box-office (which it did), whereupon the producer genially replied "That's all right. I need a tax write-off this year anyway." The Twonky is recognized today as a cult film.
