= Arch Oboler =

American dramatist (1909–1987)

- Arch Oboler with actor Tommy Cook (c. 1940)
- Born: December 7, 1907; Chicago, Illinois
- Died: March 19, 1987 (aged 79); Westlake Village, California
- Occupations: Playwright; screenwriter; novelist; producer; director

Arch Oboler (December 7, 1907 – March 19, 1987) was an American playwright, screenwriter, novelist, producer, and director who was active in radio, films, theater, and television. He generated much attention with his radio scripts, particularly the horror series Lights Out, and his work in radio remains the outstanding period of his career.

Praised as one of broadcasting's top talents, he is regarded today as a key innovator of radio drama. Oboler's personality and ego were larger than life. Radio historian John Dunning wrote, "Few people were ambivalent when it came to Arch Oboler. He was one of those intense personalities who are liked and disliked with equal fire."

== Early life ==
Oboler was born in Chicago, Illinois, to Leon and Clara Oboler, Jewish immigrants from Riga, Latvia. The family was poor, though cultured. He grew up a voracious reader and discerning music appreciator, listening to the likes of violinist Fritz Kreisler and the great soprano Amelita Galli-Curci.

== Early radio career ==
Oboler entered radio because he believed it had great unrealized potential for telling stories with ideas. He thought that the medium was being wasted on soap operas. In 1933, he wrote a speculative script called Futuristics, which satirized the world of the present in light of the future. NBC bought Oboler's script and broadcast it as part of a dedicatory program to NBC's new futuristic headquarters in New York City, Radio City. The broadcast was a success, but it set the stage for Oboler's future run-ins with broadcasters. In the play, one of Oboler's characters lampoons the slogan of American Tobacco. At that time in broadcasting history, making fun of commercials was still taboo.

From 1933 to 1936, Oboler wrote potboilers for programs such as Grand Hotel and Welch's Presents Irene Rich. Things changed in 1936, when radio's leading impresario Rudy Vallée used a short radio playlet of Oboler's titled Rich Kid. The success of Rich Kid landed Oboler a lucrative, 52-week stint writing plays for Don Ameche for The Chase and Sanborn Hour. During this time, Oboler wrote a number of idea plays and some were aired, in shortened form, on The Rudy Vallée Show and The Magic Key of RCA.

== Lights Out, Part I ==
Wyllis Cooper created Lights Out in 1934. The program aired at midnight and was notorious for its extreme (for the time) violence. In 1936, Cooper left the program for Hollywood. NBC gave Oboler the opportunity to take over the series and make it his own. He was unenthusiastic at first, "a weekly horror play that went on at Tuesday midnight to the somber introduction of 12 doleful chimes, was not exactly my idea of a writing Shangri-La...". Oboler soon realized, though, that the midnight time slot and the lack of a sponsor gave him the freedom to experiment with both story content and style. Although NBC maintained strict neutrality regarding Nazi Germany and Fascist Italy, Oboler smuggled antifascist messages onto the program. Additionally, he used stream-of-consciousness techniques that were often deemed too esoteric for commercial audiences.

Oboler caused controversy with his first play for the series, Burial Services. The ending of the play, in which a young girl is buried alive with no hope of rescue, was too much for audiences. Letters of protest poured into NBC. After this incident, Oboler toned down the realistic terror in his horror plays in favor of the fantastic. Perhaps the best-remembered story from this series of Lights Out is Chicken Heart. In that story, the tiny heart of a chicken, kept alive in a Petri dish in a laboratory, grows exponentially until it covers the entire earth. Oboler was very innovative with sound effects, and the insistent beating heart creates much of the terror in the broadcast. The story made such an impression on a young Bill Cosby that he created a memorable comic routine (featured on the Wonderfulness album) around his childhood memories of Chicken Heart; Stephen King also singles out Chicken Heart as a memorable episode in his discussion of horror radio in the book Danse Macabre. Another well-remembered story is The Dark, about a malevolent fog that turns people inside out. This story also features memorable sound effects. Like Chicken Heart, The Dark was also parodied, this time by The Simpsons on a "Treehouse of Horror" Halloween special. Oboler tired of Lights Out because he wanted to write realistic plays about Fascism. "I found myself wanting the dimensions of that half hour on the air expanded to take in the actual horror of a world facing, with half-shut eyes, the fascistic Frankenstein's monster moving over Europe.".

== Your Hollywood Parade and the Mae West incident ==
Around the time that Oboler was writing for Lights Out, he was invited to Hollywood to write sketches for the Lucky Strike-sponsored Your Hollywood Parade. The show featured such guest stars as Dick Powell, Bob Hope, Edward G. Robinson, Gary Cooper, and many others. After a frustrating encounter with Cooper, Oboler decided that he would need to direct his plays in addition to writing them.

Arch Oboler caused more controversy with his script contribution to the 12 December 1937 edition of The Chase and Sanborn Hour. In Oboler's sketch, host Don Ameche and guest Mae West portrayed a slightly bawdy Adam and Eve, satirizing the Biblical tale of the Garden of Eden. On the surface, the sketch did not feature much more than West's customary suggestive double entendres, and today it seems quite tame, but in 1937, that sketch and a subsequent routine featuring West trading suggestive quips with Edgar Bergen's dummy Charlie McCarthy caused a furor that resulted in West being banned from broadcasting and from being mentioned at all on NBC programming for 15 years. The timing may have been a contributing factor, according to radio historian Gerald S. Nachman in Raised on Radio: "The sketch resulted in letters from outraged listeners and decency groups... What upset churchgoing listeners wasn't the Biblical parody so much as the fact that it had the bad luck to air on a Sunday show."

== Arch Oboler's Plays, Part I ==
In 1939, with his own money, Oboler recorded an audition record of his play The Ugliest Man In the World, from which he hoped to launch a new radio series of idea plays. He brought the recording to his network, NBC. At the time, NBC was looking to launch an experimental radio series to rival CBS's Columbia Workshop. NBC was also looking for a radio writer and director to rival CBS's Norman Corwin. NBC gave Oboler his own series, without a sponsor and with complete creative control. NBC named the series Arch Oboler's Plays, an almost unheard-of honor. The time slot was less auspicious; the series occupied the Sunday 7:00–7:30 period opposite Jack Benny. An impressive roster of actors worked for scale to appear in Oboler's plays, including Bette Davis, Ronald Colman, Edmond O'Brien, Elsa Lanchester, and James Cagney. Perhaps the most memorable broadcast was Oboler's adaptation of Dalton Trumbo's Johnny Got His Gun, starring Cagney. The harrowing story of Joe Bonham, a World War I casualty with no limbs, eyes, ears, or mouth, was particularly suited to radio. Oboler created striking sound effects for the play, including the eerie vibration of bed springs, which Joe Bonham learns to recognize as the movement of people entering and exiting his hospital room.

Oboler's series was so successful that it attracted the sponsorship of Procter & Gamble. The new series was titled Everyman's Theatre, which was essentially Arch Oboler's Plays with commercial sponsorship. The series ran from 1940 to early 1941. Oboler lost patience with the series because of the middle commercial interruption that came during his plays. After the series ended, almost a year passed before Oboler's services were called on again.

== Plays for Americans ==
After Pearl Harbor, Oboler's antifascist plays – once shunned by corporate radio sponsors – were in demand. Oboler's new series was titled Plays for Americans; its purpose was to "stimulate the American people to the importance of the war effort by indirection rather than by direct appeal." Oboler's Plays for Americans was World War II propaganda in half-hour radio drama form, each story teaching a lesson about wartime responsibility. Oboler's shows for this series were as star-studded as his last series. James Stewart starred in Letter at Midnight, the story of a wealthy young man's conversion from isolationist to soldier. Bette Davis starred in Adolf and Mrs. Runyon, a fantasy-comedy in which Hitler finds himself magically transported into the back seat of a car belonging to an irate war bride. The program's life was cut short because of comments that Oboler made at the Radio Institute at Ohio State. Oboler was adamant that World War II propaganda should instill hatred of the enemy in the listener. To some at the institute, it sounded like Oboler was advocating the same kind of racial hatred that the Axis was advocating. Father Edward J. Flanagan rebuked Oboler and remarked that America did not need its own Goebbels. Oboler enlisted the help of Eddie Cantor to get another propaganda series on the air, but Cantor's efforts were of no avail.

== Lights Out, Part II ==
Oboler generously wrote Plays for Americans for no fee. He decided that in order "to go on writing plays which contained some level of maturity and usefulness, [he] had to find a way to make money quickly...a sponsor was quickly procured to pay me well for a revival of Lights Out". Oboler's new series carried the introduction for which it is best remembered, the sound of chimes behind announcer Frank Martin intoning:

Lights out, everybody! We bring you stories of the supernatural and the supernormal, dramatizing the fantasies and the mysteries of the unknown. We tell you this calmly, but sincerely, so if you wish to avoid the tension of these plays we advise you to turn off your radio now.

This series of Lights Out differed from its predecessors in that it contained overt anti-Nazi messages. For instance, in Execution a Nazi commandant's efforts to kill the leader of a French resistance movement are frustrated by the continual regeneration of the leader. Most of these Lights Out broadcasts are remakes of Oboler's first Lights Out series. Almost all of these broadcasts are saved, whereas only three broadcasts remain of the earlier Lights Out.

== To the President ==
At the same time that Oboler wrote Lights Out, he started a new series of propaganda plays titled To the President. "The plays used the device of a citizen speaking to the President; each drama concerned itself with the particular problem of that week in the war." Like Plays For Americans, To the President had a star-studded cast including actors such as Fred MacMurray, Claude Rains, and Harry Carey.

== Free World Theatre ==
Oboler's next series was the ambitious Free World Theater. Oboler produced and directed all 19 of the propaganda radio plays of this series, and wrote two of the plays, which were published with an introduction by Thomas Mann.

== Everything for the Boys ==
Oboler next worked with Ronald Colman on a propaganda series that featured Colman as the lead in adaptations of popular novels and plays. Colman and Oboler did not get along. Oboler chafed at the commercial interruptions of his plays. The series was an expensive disaster.

== Arch Oboler's Plays, Part II ==
Oboler's second series of Arch Oboler's Plays was broadcast over the Mutual Broadcasting Company in 1945. It aired without commercial interruption, and featured a mixture of idea and propaganda plays.

== Filmography ==

In making a leap from radio to film, Oboler was sometimes compared to Orson Welles, as in this commentary by Marty Baumann:

Even as Welles shocked much of the nation with the unforgettable War of the Worlds sham, so did Oboler incite panic with an episode detailing the horror of a giant, undulating chicken heart. The very fact that something patently silly could nonetheless be terrifying is a testament to Oboler's genius for manipulating his medium. Like Welles, Oboler was eventually summoned to Hollywood and began churning out feature scripts for mellers like RKO's Gangway for Tomorrow. Proving to producers that he knew his way around a screenplay, Arch was at last given the opportunity to direct.

His screen credits include Escape (1940) and On Our Merry Way (1948). By 1945, he moved into directing with Bewitched and Strange Holiday, followed by the post-apocalyptic Five (1951), filmed at his own Frank Lloyd Wright-designed house. He made film history with the 3-D film effects in Bwana Devil (1952). The Twonky (1953) was adapted from the Lewis Padgett (pseudonym for writers C.L. Moore and Henry Kuttner) short story in the September, 1942, issue of Astounding Science Fiction. Oboler returned to films with another 3-D feature, The Bubble, in 1966. According to a retrospective article at mondo-video.com, many writers and dramatic artists, including Rod Serling, François Truffaut and Don Coscarelli have claimed Oboler's films and radio work as significant influences.

Year	Title	Director	Writer	Producer
1940	Escape	No	Yes	No
1943	Gangway for Tomorrow	No	Yes	No
1945	Strange Holiday	Yes	Yes	Yes
1945	Bewitched	Yes	Yes	No
1947	The Arnelo Affair	Yes	Yes	No
1951	Five	Yes	Yes	Yes
1952	Bwana Devil	Yes	Yes	Yes
1953	The Twonky	Yes	Yes	Yes
1961	One Plus One	Yes	Yes	No
1966	The Bubble	Yes	Yes	Yes
1972	Domo Arigato	Yes	Yes	Yes

== Broadway ==
Sidney Lumet directed Oboler's Broadway play, Night of the Auk, a science fiction drama about astronauts returning to Earth after the first Moon landing. The play was based on Oboler's radio play Rocket from Manhattan, which aired as part of Arch Oboler's Plays in September 1945. Produced by Kermit Bloomgarden, the play ran for only eight performances in December 1956 despite a cast that included Martin Brooks, Wendell Corey, Christopher Plummer, Claude Rains and Dick York. In the December 17, 1956, issue, Time reviewed:

Night of the Auk (by Arch Oboler) took place on a rocket ship returning to the earth from man's first landing on the moon (time: "The day after some tomorrow"). The mood of the return voyage is far from jubilant, what with a loathed egomaniac in command, a succession of murders and suicides, the discovery that full-scale atomic war has broken out on earth, and the knowledge that the rocket ship itself is almost surely doomed. Playwright Oboler seems indeed to be prophesying that the atomic age may end up with man as extinct as the great auk. Closing at week's end, the play mingled one or two thrills with an appalling number of frills, one or two philosophic truths with a succession of Polonius-like truisms, an occasional feeling for language with pretentious and barbarous misuse of it. A good cast of actors, including Claude Rains, Christopher Plummer and Wendell Corey, were unhappily squandered on a pudding of a script – part scientific jargon, part Mermaid Tavern verse, part Madison Avenue prose – that sounded like cosmic advertising copy.

A version of Night of the Auk aired as an episode of the anthology television series Play of the Week in 1960. In August 2012, Outside Inside Productions presented the first New York revival of Night of the Auk at the 16th Annual New York International Fringe Festival. Authorized by the Oboler family, this new production, directed by Adam Levi with co-direction by Kaitlyn Samuel, was a 75-minute one-act version of the original play, adapted by playwright Michael Ross Albert.

== Television ==
In 1949, Oboler helmed an anthology television series, Oboler's Comedy Theatre (aka Arch Oboler's Comedy Theater) which ran for six episodes from September to November. In the premiere show, "Ostrich in Bed," a couple awaiting the arrival of a dinner guest find an ostrich in their bedroom. In "Mr. Dydee" a dim-witted horse player inherits a diaper service.

== Recordings ==

Oboler's LP recording, Drop Dead! An Exercise in Horror (Capitol Records, 1962) features horror-themed dramatic vignettes, interspersed with commentary from Oboler: "Introduction to Horror", "I'm Hungry", "Taking Papa Home", "The Dark", "A Day at the Dentist's", "The Posse", "Chicken Heart", and "The Laughing Man".

"Arch Oboler's African Adventure" (Decca 10" LP)field recordings during the filming of Bwana Devil.

== Books ==
=== Novels ===
House on Fire (Bartholomew House, 1969), was adapted by Oboler for radio's Mutual Radio Theater in 1980. in 2015, Valancourt Books reissued House on Fire with a new introduction by Christopher Conlon.

=== Collected works ===
- Free World Theatre: Nineteen New Radio Plays (Random House, 1944)
- Oboler Omnibus: Radio Plays and Personalities (Duell, Sloan & Pearce, 1945)
- Night of the Auk: A Free Prose Play was published by Horizon Press in 1958

=== Short stories ===
His short story "And Adam Begot" was included in Julius Fast's Out of This World anthology (Penguin, 1944) "Come to the Bank" was published in Weird Tales (Fall 1984). "Happy Year," a short story based on an Oboler script "from the Good News program," was published (beginning on page 8) in the December 1940 issue of Radio and Television Mirror.

=== Non-fiction ===
"My Jackasses and the Fire" in the June 1960 issue of Coronet.

== Personal life ==
Oboler married the former Eleanor Helfand; they had four sons: Guy, David, Steven and Peter Oboler.

In 1953, Oboler had a mental breakdown. On April 7, 1958, Oboler's six-year-old son, Peter, drowned in rainwater collected in excavations at Oboler's Malibu home. The house was designed by architect Frank Lloyd Wright; the Wright-designed Oboler residential complex was named Eaglefeather (which was destroyed in 2018 by the Woolsey Fire). The house is featured in Oboler's film Five and in the Robert Benton 1998 film Twilight. Arch Oboler died in Westlake Village, California, in 1987, aged 79.
