= Arch Oboler's Plays =

- Genre: Dramatic anthology
- Running time: 30 minutes
- Country of origin: United States
- Language(s): English
- Syndicates: NBC; Mutual
- Created by: Arch Oboler
- Written by: Arch Oboler
- Directed by: Arch Oboler
- Produced by: Arch Oboler
- Original release: March 25, 1939 – October 11, 1945

Arch Oboler and Tommy Cook rehearse for Arch Oboler's Plays

Arch Oboler's Plays is a radio anthology series written, produced and directed by Arch Oboler. Minus a sponsor, it ran for one year, airing Saturday evenings on NBC from March 25, 1939, to March 23, 1940, and revived five years later on Mutual for a sustaining summer run from April 5, 1945, to October 11, 1945.

Lewis Titterton, an executive at NBC, originated the program's title. Titterton was described as a man who "thought the future of radio depended on the vision of the writer."

With the launching of Arch Oboler's Plays, Oboler became "the first writer accorded name-in-the-title status." Christopher H. Sterling, in his book Biographical Dictionary of Radio, wrote, "Oboler, writing about 'the terrors and monsters within each of us,' used his stream-of-consciousness technique to shattering effect and made radio a viable new art form."

Oboler used some of the scripts from Arch Oboler's Plays on his later series, Everyman's Theater.

Leading film actors were heard on this series, including Ingrid Bergman, Gloria Blondell, Eddie Cantor, James Cagney, Ronald Colman, Joan Crawford, Greer Garson, Edmund Gwenn, Van Heflin, Katharine Hepburn, Elsa Lanchester, Peter Lorre, Frank Lovejoy, Raymond Massey, Burgess Meredith, Paul Muni, Alla Nazimova, Edmond O'Brien, Geraldine Page, Hester Sondergaard, Franchot Tone and George Zucco.

In 2020, the Library of Congress included the November 18, 1939 episode, "The Bathysphere", among its inductees to the National Recording Registry for "cultural, historical and aesthetic importance to the nation’s recorded sound heritage."

== See also ==
- Oboler Comedy Theater
- Everyman's Theater was a one-season program, broadcast in 1940–41, much like Arch Oboler's Plays.
