= Anthology series =

Form of broadcast entertainment

Lux Radio Theatre ad art featuring Joan Crawford

An anthology series is a written series, radio, television, film, or video game series that presents a different story and a different set of characters in each different episode, season, segment, or short. These usually have a different cast in each episode, but several series in the past, such as Four Star Playhouse, employed a permanent troupe of character actors who would appear in a different drama each week. Some anthology series, such as Studio One, began on radio and then expanded to television.

== Etymology ==
The word comes from Ancient Greek ἀνθολογία (anthología, "flower-gathering"), from ἀνθολογέω (anthologéō, "I gather flowers"), from ἄνθος (ánthos, "flower") + λέγω (légō, "I gather, pick up, collect"), coined by Meleager of Gadara circa 60 BCE, originally as Στέφανος (στέφανος (stéphanos, "garland")) to describe a collection of poetry, later retitled anthology – see Greek Anthology. Anthologiai were collections of small Greek poems and epigrams, because in Greek culture the flower symbolized the finer sentiments that only poetry can express.

== Radio ==
Many popular old-time radio programs were anthology series. On some series, such as Inner Sanctum Mystery, the only constant was the host, who introduced and concluded each dramatic presentation. One of the earliest such programs was The Collier Hour, broadcast on the NBC Blue Network from 1927 to 1932. As radio's first major dramatic anthology, it adapted stories and serials from Collier's Weekly in a calculated move to increase subscriptions and compete with The Saturday Evening Post. Airing on the Wednesday prior to each week's distribution of the magazine, the program soon moved to Sundays in order to avoid spoilers with dramatizations of stories simultaneously appearing in the magazine.

=== Drama ===
- Academy Award Theater
- Arch Oboler's Plays
- The Campbell Playhouse
- Cavalcade of America
- CBS Radio Workshop
- Earplay
- Family Hour of Stars
- Ford Theater (radio series)
- Four Star Playhouse
- Lux Radio Theater
- Hollywood Star Time
- The Mercury Theatre on the Air
- Radio City Playhouse
- The Screen Guild Theater
- Stars over Hollywood

=== Genre series ===
Radio anthology series provided for science fiction, horror, suspense, and mystery genres (all produced in the US, unless noted):

Nelson Olmsted of NBC's Sleep No More fantasy series

- Mystery House (1929–c. 1944)
- The Witch's Tale (1931–38) (written by Alonzo Deen Cole)
- Lights Out (1934–47) (written by Wyllis Cooper/Arch Oboler)
- The Hermit's Cave (1935–c. 1945)
- Famous Jury Trials (1936–49)
- Dark Fantasy (1941–42) (written by Scott Bishop)
- Inner Sanctum Mystery (1941–52) (created by Himan Brown)
- The Whistler (1942–55)
- Suspense (1942–62)
- The Weird Circle (1943–45)
- The Mysterious Traveler (1943–52) (written by Robert Arthur, Jr. and narrated by Maurice Tarplin)
- Creeps by Night (1944)
- Mystery Playhouse (1944) (hosted by Peter Lorre)
- The Strange Dr. Weird (1944–45) (15-minute shorts, written by Robert Arthur, Jr. and narrated by Maurice Tarplin)
- The Haunting Hour (1944–46)
- The Sealed Book (1945) (written by Robert Arthur, Jr.)
- Mystery in the Air (1945–47) (starring Peter Lorre)
- Murder at Midnight (1946–50)
- Quiet, Please (1947–49) (written by Wyllis Cooper, starring Ernest Chappell)
- Escape (1947–54)
- The Unexpected (1948) (15-minute shorts)
- Destination Freedom (1948–50), written by Richard Durham
- Murder by Experts (1949–51)
- The Hall of Fantasy (1949–53)
- 2000 Plus (1950–52) (the first adult science fiction series on radio)
- Dimension X (1950–51) (featured adapted stories by authors including Isaac Asimov, Ray Bradbury and Kurt Vonnegut)
- ABC Mystery Theater (1951–54), anthology, crime and mystery series
- Sleep No More (1952–56) (featured Nelson Olmsted narrating his own adaptations of stories)
- Theater 10:30 (1955) (Canadian)
- X Minus One (1955–58) (revival and continuation of Dimension X)

The final episode of Suspense was broadcast on September 30, 1962, a date that has traditionally been seen as marking the end of the old-time radio era. However, genre series produced since 1962 include:

- The Black Mass (1963–67)
- The Creaking Door (1964–65) (South African)
- Beyond Midnight (1968–69) (South African)
- The Zero Hour (1973–74) (hosted by Rod Serling)
- Mystery Theater (1974–82) (created by Himan Brown of Inner Sanctum Mystery)
- Nightfall (1980–83) (Canadian)
- The Cabinet of Dr. Fritz (1984–85) (broadcast in "3D-Sound" stereo)
- 2000X (2000) (literary adaptations)
- The Twilight Zone (2002–03)

== Television ==
In the history of television, live anthology dramas were especially popular during the Golden Age of Television of the 1950s with series such as The United States Steel Hour and The Philco Television Playhouse.

Dick Powell came up with an idea for an anthology series, Four Star Playhouse, with a rotation of established stars every week, four stars in all. The stars would own the studio and the program, as Lucille Ball and Desi Arnaz had done successfully with Desilu studio. Powell had intended for the program to feature himself, Charles Boyer, Joel McCrea, and Rosalind Russell. When Russell and McCrea backed out, David Niven came on board as the third star. The fourth star was initially a guest star. CBS liked the idea, and Four Star Playhouse made its debut in fall of 1952. It ran on alternate weeks only during the first season, alternating with Amos 'n' Andy. It was successful enough to be renewed and became a weekly program from the second season until the end of its run in 1956. Ida Lupino was brought on board as the de facto fourth star, though unlike Powell, Boyer, and Niven, she owned no stock in the company.

American television networks would sometimes run summer anthology series which consisted of unsold television pilots. Beginning in 1971, the long-run Masterpiece Theatre drama anthology series brought British productions to American television.

In 2011, American Horror Story debuted a new type of anthology format in the United States. Each season, rather than each episode, is a standalone story. Several actors have appeared in the various seasons but playing different roles—in an echo of the Four Star Playhouse format.

The success of American Horror Story has spawned other season-long anthologies such as American Crime Story and True Detective.

=== American drama ===
- The 20th Century Fox Hour (1955–57)
- ABC Movie of the Week (1969–75)
- ABC Stage 67 (1966–67)
- Academy Theatre (1949)
- Actors Studio (1948–50)
- Alcoa-Goodyear Theatre (1957–58)
- The Alcoa Hour (1955–57)
- Alcoa Premiere (1961–63)
- American Crime (2015–17)
- American Crime Story (2016–2021)
- American Horror Story (2011–present)
- American Film Theatre (1973–75)
- American Playhouse (1981–94)
- The American Playwrights Theater: The One Acts (1989–90)
- The American Short Story (1974–80)
- Appointment with Adventure (1955–56)
- Armstrong Circle Theatre (1950–57)
- The Barbara Stanwyck Show (1960–61)
- Behind Closed Doors (1958–59)
- The Best of Broadway (1954–55)
- The Best of the Post (1960–61)
- Betty Crocker Star Matinee (1951–52)
- The Bigelow Theatre (1950–51)
- The Billy Rose Show, also known as Billy Rose's Playbill (1950–51)
- Bob Hope Presents the Chrysler Theatre (1963–67)
- The Bold Ones (1969–73)
- Broadway Television Theatre (1952–54)
- Buick-Electra Playhouse (1959–60)
- Cameo Theatre (1950–55)
- Camera Three (1955–79)
- The Campbell Playhouse, also known as Campbell Soundstage and Campbell Summer Soundstage (1952–54)
- Cavalcade of America (1952–57)
- CBS Playhouse (1967–70)
- CBS Summer Playhouse (1987–89)
- CBS Television Workshop (1952)
- CBS Workshop, also known as CBS Repertoire Workshop (1960)
- Celanese Theatre (1951–52)
- Celebrity Playhouse (1955–56)
- Center Stage (1954)
- Cheer Television Theatre (1954)
- The Chevrolet Tele-Theatre also known as Chevrolet on Broadway (1948–50)
- Chevron Hall of Stars (1956)
- Chevron Theatre (1952–53)
- Climax! (1954–58)
- Colgate Theatre (1949–50)
- Colgate Theatre (1958)
- Conflict (1956–57)
- Conrad Nagel Theater (1955)
- Cosmopolitan Theatre (1951)
- Crown Theatre with Gloria Swanson (1952–55)
- Curtain Call (1952)
- Damon Runyon Theater (1955–56)
- Danger (1950–1955)
- The Danny Thomas Hour (1967–68)
- The David Niven Show (1959)
- Deadline (1959–61)
- Death Valley Days (1952–70)
- Decision (1958)
- Demi-Tasse Tales (1953)
- The Dick Powell Show (1961–63)
- Dispatches from Elsewhere (2020)
- The Doctors (1963–1982)
- Douglas Fairbanks, Jr., Presents, also known as Rheingold Theatre (1953–57)
- Drama at Eight (1953)
- DuMont Royal Theater (1951–52)
- The DuPont Show of the Month (1957–61)
- The DuPont Show of the Week (1961–64)
- The DuPont Show with June Allyson (1959–61)
- The Elgin Hour (1954–55)
- The Errol Flynn Theatre (1956–57)
- Ethel Barrymore Theatre (1956)
- Faith Baldwin Romance Theatre (1951)
- Fargo (2014–present)
- Feud (2017–present)
- Fireside Theater (1949–58)
- The First Lady (2022)
- Footlights Theater (1952–53)
- Ford Star Jubilee (1955–56)
- Ford Television Theatre (1952–57)
- Ford Theatre (1948–51)
- Four Star Playhouse (1952–56)
- GE True (1962–63)
- G.E. Summer Originals (1956)
- General Electric Theater (1953–62)
- Genius (2017–present)
- Goodyear Television Playhouse (1951–57)
- Goodyear Theatre (1957–60)
- Goosebumps (1995-98)
- Great Performances (1971–present)
- Gruen Playhouse, also known as Gruen Guild Theatre (1951–53)
- The Gulf Playhouse (1952–53)
- Hallmark Hall of Fame (1951–present)
- The Haunting (2018–2020)
- Hollywood Premiere Theatre, also known as Hollywood Theatre Time (1950–51)
- International Playhouse (1951)
- John Waters Presents Movies That Will Corrupt You (2006)
- The Joseph Cotten Show, also known as On Trial (1956–59)
- Joseph Schildkraut Presents (1953–54)
- The Kaiser Aluminum Hour (1956–57)
- Kraft Television Theatre (1947–58)
- Law & Order True Crime (2017)
- The Lloyd Bridges Show (1962–63)
- The Loretta Young Show (1953–61)
- Lottery! (1983–84)
- Love Story (1954)
- Love Story (1973–74)
- Lux Playhouse (1958–59)
- Lux Video Theater (1950–59)
- The Magnavox Theatre (1950)
- The Mail Story (1954)
- Masterpiece Contemporary (2008–11)
- Masterpiece Playhouse (1950)
- Masterpiece Theatre (1971–present)
- Matinee Theatre (1955–58)
- Max Liebman Spectaculars, also known as Max Liebman Presents (1954–56)
- Medallion Theatre, also known as Chrysler Medallion Theatre (1953–54)
- MGM Parade (1955–56)
- The Millionaire (1955–60)
- Monodrama Theater (1953)
- Monster (2022–present)
- The Motorola Television Hour (1953–54)
- Mr. Citizen (1955)
- The Nash Airflyte Theater (1950–51)
- NBC Presents (1949–50)
- NBC Television Opera Theatre (1950–64)
- NET Playhouse (1964–72)
- New York Television Theatre (1965–70)
- Night Editor (1954)
- Nine Thirty Curtain (1953–54)
- The O. Henry Playhouse (1957)
- Ominbus (1952–1961)
- One Man's Experience (1952–53)
- One Woman's Experience (1952–53)
- Orient Express (1953)
- The Passerby (1951–56)
- The Pepsi-Cola Playhouse (1953–55)
- Personal Appearance Theater (1951–52)
- The Philco-Goodyear Television Playhouse (1948–56)
- The Philco Television Playhouse (1948–55)
- The Philip Morris Playhouse (1953–54)
- The Play of the Week (1959–61)
- Playhouse 90 (1956–60)
- Playwrights '56 (1956)
- Plymouth Playhouse also known as ABC Album (1953–54)
- Ponds Theater, also known as Kraft Television Theater (1953–57)
- Premiere (1968)
- Preview Tonight (1966)
- Producers' Showcase (1954–57)
- Program Playhouse (1949)
- Prudential Family Playhouse (1950–51)
- Pulitzer Prize Playhouse (1950–52)
- Pulse of the City (1953–54)
- Pursuit (1958–59)
- The Revlon Mirror Theater (1953)
- The Richard Boone Show (1963–64)
- The Robert Herridge Theatre (1960–61)
- Robert Montgomery Presents (1950–57)
- Romance, also known as Theatre of Romance (1949–50)
- Romance Theatre (1982–83)
- Room 104 (2017–20)
- The Schaefer Century Theatre (1952)
- Schilling Playhouse (1959–60)
- Schlitz Playhouse of Stars (1951–59)
- Scream (2015–19)
- Screen Associates Films (1952–53)
- Screen Director's Playhouse (1955–56)
- The Seven Lively Arts (1957–58)
- Short Short Dramas (1952–53)
- The Silver Theatre (1949–50)
- Sneak Preview (1956)
- Somerset Maugham TV Theatre (1950–51)
- Stage 7 (1955–56)
- The Star and the Story (1955–56)
- Star Stage (1955–56)
- Star Tonight (1955–56)
- Starlight Theatre (1950–51)
- Stars Over Hollywood (1950–51)
- Startime (1959–60)
- Studio One (1948–58)
- Studio 57 (1954–58)
- Summer Playhouse (1964–67)
- Sunday Showcase (1959–60)
- Suspicion (1957–1958)
- Sweepstakes (1979)
- Telephone Time (1956–58)
- Television Playhouse (1947–48)
- Television Theatre (1950)
- Theatre Hour (1949–50)
- Theatre of the Mind (1949)
- Theatre '62 (1961–62)
- Tonight on Broadway (1948–49)
- The Trap (1950)
- TriBeCa (1993)
- True Detective (2014–present)
- TV Reader's Digest (1955–56)
- The Twilight Zone (1959–1964)
- The United States Steel Hour (1953–63)
- The White Lotus (2021–present)
- Unsolved (2018–present)
- Vacation Playhouse (1963–67)
- Visions (1976–80)
- Warner Bros. Presents (1955–56)
- The Watcher (1995)
- Westinghouse Desilu Playhouse (1958–60)
- Why Women Kill (2019-2021)
- Willys Theatre Presenting Ben Hecht's Tales of the City (1953)
- Windows (1955)
- Your Favorite Story (1953–55)
- Your Jeweler's Showcase (1952–53)
- Your Show Time (1949)
- Your Story Theatre (also known as Story Theatre and Durkee Story Theatre) (1950–51)

=== Anime ===
- Gokujō!! Mecha Mote Iinchō (2009–2011)
- The Grimm Variations (2024)
- Hakken Taiken Daisuki! Shimajirō (2008–2010)
- Mewkledreamy Mix! (2020–2021)
- Miracle! Mimika (2006–2009)
- Shimajirō Hesoka (2010–2012)
- Shimajirō no Wow! (2012-present)
- Shūkan Storyland (1999–2001)

=== British drama ===
- Armchair 30 (1973)
- Armchair Theatre (1956–74)
- Armchair Mystery Theatre (1960, 1964, 1965)
- Armchair Thriller (1978–81)
- BBC Play of the Month (1965–83)
- BBC Sunday-Night Theatre (1950–59)
- BBC2 Playhouse (1973–83)
- Beasts (1976)
- Black Mirror (2011–)
- A Choice of Coward (1964)
- City '68 (1967–68)
- The Canterbury Tales (2003)
- Creeped Out (2017–2019)
- Drama (1977)
- Escape (1957)
- Gaslight Theatre (1965)
- Hammer House of Horror (1980)
- Hammer House of Mystery and Suspense (1984)
- H.M. Tennent Globe Theatre (1956)
- Hour of Mystery (1957)
- Inside No 9 (2014–2020)
- ITV Play of the Week (1955–74)
- ITV Playhouse (1967–82)
- ITV Sunday Night Theatre (1969–74)
- ITV Sunday Night Drama (1959–80)
- Festival (1963–64)
- Late Night Theatre (1972–74)
- Love Story (1963–74)
- London Playhouse (1955–56)
- Moving On (2009–2021)
- Mystery and Imagination (1966)
- National Theatre Live (2009–)
- Orson Welles' Great Mysteries ( 1973–74)
- Performance (1991–98)
- Play for Today (1970–84)
- Play for Tomorrow (1982)
- Playhouse Presents (2012–14)
- Saturday Playhouse (1958–60)
- Second City Firsts (1973–78)
- Screen One (1989–93)
- Screen Two (1985–94)
- Skins (2007–13)
- Stage 2 (1971–72)
- Tales of the Unexpected (1979–88)
- Theatre Night (1985–90)
- Theatre Parade (1936–37)
- Theatre 70 (1960–61)
- Theatre 625 (1964–68)
- Theatre Royal (1955–56)
- Thirty-Minute Theatre (1965–73)
- Thursday Theatre (1964–65)
- The Afternoon Play (2003–07)
- The Wednesday Play (1964–70)
- Wales Playhouse (1990–96)
- Weekend Playhouse (1984)

=== Canadian drama ===
- First Performance (1955–58)
- General Motors Theatre (1953–61)
- Encounter (1958)
- Norman Corwin Presents (1972)
- On Camera (1954–58)
- Plan B (2023-present)
- Playdate (1961–64)
- Virage (2021-present)

=== Korean drama ===
- Reply (2012–16)

=== Indian drama ===
- Aahat (1995–15)
- Bible Ki Kahaniya (1993–95)
- Gumrah: End of Innocence (2012–16)
- Hoshiyar… Sahi Waqt, Sahi Kadam (2016–17)
- Ishq Kills (2014)
- Kabhie Kabhie (2003 TV series) (2003)
- Katha Sagar (1986)
- Kaun Hai? (2018–)
- Kirdaar (1993–94)
- Koi Aane Ko Hai (2009)
- Khidki (2016)
- Kya Hadsaa Kya Haqeeqat (2002–04)
- Laal Ishq (2018 TV series) (2018–)
- MTV Big F (2015–17)
- Pyaar Tune Kya Kiya (TV series) (2014–)
- Rishtey (TV series) (1997–2001)
- Robi Thakurer Golpo (2015–16)
- Saturday Suspense (2018–20)
- Star Bestsellers (1999–2000)
- Stories by Rabindranath Tagore (2015–)
- Teri Meri Love Stories (2012)
- Twist wala love
- Yeh Hai Aashiqui (2013–16)
- Yule Love Story (1993–95)

=== Mexican drama ===
- Mujer, Casos de la Vida Real (1986–2007)
- Lo que callamos las mujeres (2000–present)
- La rosa de Guadalupe (2008–present)
- Como dice el dicho (2011–25)

=== Pakistani drama ===
- Kitni Girhain Baaki Hain (2011–14)
- Sasural Ke Rang Anokhay (2012–13)
- Shareek-e-Hayat (2014–15)
- Kitni Girhain Baqi Hain! Phir Se (2016–17)
- Ustani Jee (2018)
- Kabhi Band Kabhi Baja (2018)
- Choti Choti Batain (2019)

=== Philippine drama ===
- Maalaala Mo Kaya (1991–2022, 2025)
- Magpakailanman (2002–07, 2012–present)
- Wansapanataym (1997–2005, 2010–19)

=== Thai drama ===
- Girl from Nowhere (2018–present)

=== Animated ===
- Adventures from the Book of Virtues (1996–2000)
- Andersen Monogatari (1971)
- Animal Stories (1998–2001)
- Animated Tales of the World (2001–03)
- Ayakashi: Samurai Horror Tales (2006)
- The Bob Clampett Show (2000–2001)
- Bugs 'n' Daffy (1995–98)
- The Bugs Bunny Show (1960–2000)
- The Busy World of Richard Scarry (1993–97)
- A Bunch of Munsch (1991–92)
- Cartoon Alley (2004–07)
- The Cartoonstitute (2010)
- The Cat&Birdy Warneroonie PinkyBrainy Big Cartoonie Show (1999–2000)
- CB Bears (1977–78)
- The Chuck Jones Show (2001–02)
- Ciné si (1989)
- The Comic Strip (1987)
- Cream Lemon (1984–87)
- DC Nation Shorts (2011–14)
- Donald Duck Presents (1983–92)
- Donald's Quack Attack (1992–2000)
- Dragons et princesses (2010)
- Fabulous Funnies (1978–79)
- The Fairytaler (2002–03)
- Famous Classic Tales (1970–84)
- Festival of Family Classics (1972–73)
- Fix & Foxi and Friends (2000–02)
- Force Five (1980–89)
- Freaky Stories (1997–2000)
- Fred Flintstone and Friends (1978–79)
- Funpak (2005)
- General Electric Fantasy Hour (c. 1960s)
- Good Morning, Mickey! (1983–92)
- The Great Book of Nature (1999–2000)
- Grimm's Fairy Tale Classics (1987–88)
- Grizzly Tales for Gruesome Kids (2000–12)
- The Hanna-Barbera New Cartoon Series (1962–63)
- Hanna–Barbera's World of Super Adventure (1979–84)
- Hans Fischerkoesen's commercial films (1949–69)
- Happily Ever After: Fairy Tales for Every Child (1995–2000)
- The Harveytoons Show (1950–62)
- HBO Storybook Musicals (1987–93)
- House of Mouse (2001–03)
- Infinity Train (2019–21)
- The Ink and Paint Club (1997–98)
- Julius Pinschwer's commercial films (1910–57)
- KaBlam! (1996–2000)
- Kideo TV (1986–87)
- The Kwicky Koala Show (1981–82)
- Late Night, Black and White (1996–2003)
- Legends of Bikini Bottom (2011)
- A Little Curious (1999–2000)
- MAD (2010–13)
- Manga Sekai Mukashi Banashi (1976–79)
- The Marvel Super Heroes (1966)
- The Merrie Melodies Show (1972)
- Merrie Melodies Starring Bugs Bunny & Friends (1990–92)
- Mickey Mouse and Friends (1994–95)
- Mickey Mouse Works (1999–2000)
- Mickey's Mouse Tracks (1992–95)
- Mighty Mouse Playhouse (1955–67)
- Mononoke (2007)
- The Mouse Factory (1972–73)
- The Moxy Show (1993–95)
- My Little Pony (1986–87)
- The New Woody Woodpecker Show (1999–2002)
- O Canada (1997–2002)
- Oh Yeah! Cartoons (1998–2001)
- Peanuts (2016)
- The Pink Panther Show (1969–80)
- The Popeye Show (2001–03)
- The Porky Pig Show (1964–67)
- Princes et princesses (1989)
- Random! Cartoons (2008–09)
- Raw Toonage (1992–93)
- Right Now Kapow (2016–17)
- The Road Runner Show (1966–72)
- Rumic Theater (2003–04)
- Saturday Supercade (1983–84)
- Shelley Duvall's Bedtime Stories (1992–93)
- Short Circutz (1994–96)
- Shorts in a Bunch (2007–08)
- Shorty McShorts' Shorts (2006–07)
- Super Sunday (1985–86)
- Super Why! (2007–16)
- Tales From the Cryptkeeper (1993–2000)
- The Tex Avery Show (1996–2002)
- Timeless Tales from Hallmark (1990–91)
- ToonHeads (1992–2003)
- Toon In with Me (2021–present)
- Totally Tooned In (1999–2000)
- Two More Eggs (2015–17)
- The Wacky World of Tex Avery (1997)
- What a Cartoon! (1995–97)
- The Woody Woodpecker Show (1958–59)
- The World of Peter Rabbit and Friends (1992–95)
- Zootopia+ (2022)

=== Adult animation ===
- The Boys Presents: Diabolical (2022)
- Cake (2019–2021)
- Cartoon Sushi (1997–98)
- Greatest Party Story Ever (2016)
- Jokebook (1982)
- Like, Share, Die (2015)
- Liquid Television (1991–94)
- Love, Death & Robots (2019–present)
- Off the Air (2011–present)
- Party Legends (2016–17)
- Robot Chicken (2005–present)
- The Shivering Truth (2018-2020)
- Spicy City (1997)
- Sunday Pants (2005–06)
- Treehouse of Horror (1990–present)

=== Children and family ===
- ABC Afterschool Special (1972–97)
- ABC Weekend Special (1977–97)
- CBS Afternoon Playhouse (1978–83)
- CBS Children's Film Festival (1967–78)
- CBS Children's Mystery Theatre (1980–82)
- CBS Schoolbreak Special (1984–96)
- CBS Storybreak (1985–87)
- Disneyland (1954–58)
- Dramarama (1983–89)
- Faerie Tale Theatre (1982–87)
- The Fox Cubhouse (1994–96) (contains Johnson and Friends, Jim Henson's Animal Show, Rimba's Island, Magic Adventures of Mumfie and Budgie the Little Helicopter)
- It's Itsy Bitsy Time (1999) (contains Budgie the Little Helicopter, 64 Zoo Lane, The Animal Shelf, Tom and Vicky, Charley and Mimmo, ZZZap! and Philipp)
- Jackanory (UK, 1972–85)
- Kaboodle (1987–90)
- Lift Off (1992–95)
- NBC Children's Theatre (1963–73)
- Noddy (1998–2000)
- Off to See the Wizard (1967–68)
- Once Upon a Classic (1976–80)
- Shining Time Station (1989–93)
- Shirley Temple's Storybook (1958–61)
- Special Treat, also known as NBC Special Treat (1975–86)
- Tall Tales and Legends (1985–87)
- Walt Disney Presents (1958–61)
- Walt Disney's Wonderful World of Color (1961–69)
- The Wonderful World of Disney (1969–2009)
- WonderWorks (1984)
- The Wubbulous World of Dr. Seuss (1996–98)

=== Comedies ===
- The Comic Strip Presents... (1982–2015)
- Carol and Company (1990–91)
- Cilla's Comedy Six (UK, 1975)
- Cilla's World of Comedy (UK, 1976)
- Comedy Lab (1998–)
- Comedy Playhouse (UK, 1961–2014)
- Comedy Playhouse (US, 1971)
- The Comedy Spot (1960–62; titled Comedy Spotlight during 1961)
- Comedy Theater (1981)
- Comedy Theatre (1976 & 1979)
- Comedy Time (1977)
- Dear Uge (2016–)
- Dr. Terrible's House of Horrible (2001)
- The Eddie Cantor Comedy Theatre (1955)
- El Chapulín Colorado (1973–79)
- Ripping Yarns (UK, 1978–79)
- George Burns Comedy Week (1985)
- Good Heavens (1976)
- The Guest Book (2017–18)
- High Maintenance (2012–15, 2016–present)
- Human Remains (2000)
- Inside No. 9 (2014–)
- Just for Laughs (1974)
- Love, American Style (1969–74)
- Miracle Workers (2019–23)
- Murder Most Horrid (UK, 1991–99)
- New Comedy Showcase (1960)
- Oboler Comedy Theater (1949)
- Premiere (1968)
- The Ronnie Barker Playhouse (UK, 1968)
- Seven of One (UK, 1973)
- Six Dates with Barker (UK, 1971)
- Summer Fun (1966)
- Undressed (1999–2002)
- Vacation Playhouse (1963–67)
- Westinghouse Preview Theatre (1961)

=== Crime dramas ===
- Adventure Theater (1956)
- American Crime (2015–17)
- American Crime Story (2016–)
- Agatha Christie's Marple (UK, 2005–14)
- Agatha Christie's Poirot (UK, 1989–2014)
- The Big Story (1949–58)
- The Black Robe, also known as Police Night Court (1949–50)
- Crime Patrol (2003–)
- Fargo (2014–)
- FBI: The Untold Stories (1991–93)
- Gang Busters (1952, 1954–55)
- Lawbreakers (1963–64)
- The Man Behind the Badge (1953–55)
- Official Detective (1957–58)
- Police Call (1955)
- Police Story (1952)
- Police Story (1973–78)
- Tatort (1970–)
- The Rivals of Sherlock Holmes (UK, 1971–73)
- They Stand Accused (1949–52, 1954)
- True Detective (2014–)
- Underbelly (2008–)
- The Walter Winchell File (1957–58)
- The Whistler (1954–55)
- The Sinner (2017–21)

=== Educational ===
- Inside/Out (1972–73)
- Omnibus (US, 1952–61)

=== Historical ===
- Captain Newfoundland from the Tip of Atlantis/Captain Atlantis Late Night (Canada, 1972–present)
- The Great Adventure (1963–64)
- Our American Heritage (1959–61)
- Profiles in Courage (1964–65)
- Saga of Western Man (1963–69)
- You are There (1953–57)

=== Medical ===
- The Doctor, also known as The Visitor (1952–53)
- Medic (1954–56)
- Medical Story (1975–76)

=== Military ===
- Flight (1958–59)
- Men of Annapolis (1957–58)
- Navy Log (1955–58)
- The Silent Service (1957–59)
- The West Point Story aka West Point (1956–57)

=== Mystery and Suspense ===
Title	Started	Ended	Seasons	Episodes	Notes
Alfred Hitchcock Presents	1955	1962	7	268	Original series
The Alfred Hitchcock Hour	1962	1965	3	93	Hour-long continuation of Alfred Hitchcock Presents
Alfred Hitchcock Presents	1985	1989	4	76	Revival series
Behind Closed Doors	1958	1959	1	39	
The Best in Mystery	1954	1954	1	13	
The Boris Karloff Mystery Playhouse	1949	1949	1	13	
Byline	1951	1951	1	39	Also known as Adventures in Mystery and News Gal
The Chevy Mystery Show	1960	1960	1	26	
The Clock	1949	1952	3	78	
Danger	1950	1955	5	178	
Dark of Night	1952	1954	2	104	
Darkroom	1981	1982	1	7	
Dow Hour of Great Mysteries	1960	1960	1	26	
The Edgar Wallace Mystery Theatre	1960	1965	5	47	American TV version of British theatrical second features
Escape	1950	1950	1	26	
Escape	1973	1973	1	6	
Espionage	1963	1964	1	24	
Eye Witness	1953	1953	1	13	
Fallen Angels	1993	1995	2	15	
George Sanders Mystery Theater	1957	1957	1	39	
Gun	1997	1997	1	6	
Hands of Mystery	1949	1952	3	156	Also known as Hands of Destiny, Hands of Murder
The Hitchhiker	1983	1987	4	58	
I Spy	1955	1957	2	117	
Inner Sanctum	1954	1954	1	39	
Invitation Playhouse: Mind Over Murder	1952	1952	1	13	
Kraft Mystery Theatre	1961	1963	3	39	Summer series 1961, 1962, 1963
Kraft Suspense Theatre	1963	1965	2	62	
Mr. Arsenic	1952	1952	1	26	
Murder in Mind	2001	2003	3	18	
Murder Most Horrid	1991	1999	4	24	UK series
Mystery!	1980	ongoing	44+	600+	Long-running PBS anthology series
Panic!	1957	1958	1	39	
Philip Morris Playhouse	1953	1954	1	52	
Rebound	1952	1953	1	78	Also known as Counterpoint
Scene of the Crime	1991	1992	1	13	
Stage 13	1950	1950	1	26	
Sure as Fate	1950	1951	1	52	
Suspense	1949	1954	5	260	
Suspicion	1957	1958	1	42	
Target	1958	1958	1	39	
Twisted Tales	1996	1997	1	13	
Two Twisted	2006	2006	1	13	Sequel to Twisted Tales
The Vise	1955	1957	2	78	
Volume One	1949	1949	1	26	
The Web	1950	1954	4	208	
The Web	1957	1957	1	39	Syndication title Undercurrent
Your Play Time	1953	1955	2	104	

=== Religious ===
Title	Started	Ended	Seasons	Episodes	Notes
Patriarchs and Prophets	Volume 1	Volume 2	Volume 3	–	–
Crossroads also known as Way of Life	1955	1957	2	78	–
Family Theater	1949	1958	–	540	–
Insight	1960	1984	23	250	–
Lamp Unto My Feet	1948	1969	–	–	–
Look Up and Live	1967	1971	–	–	–
This Is the Life also known as The Fisher Family	1952	1988	–	–	

=== Science fiction and horror ===
Title	Started	Ended	Seasons	Episodes	Notes
Alcoa Presents: One Step Beyond	1959	1961	3	96	–
Amazing Stories (original series)	1985	1987	2	45	–
Amazing Stories (reboot)	2020	2020	1	5	–
American Horror Story	2011	Present	11	114	–
American Horror Stories	2021	Present	3	24	–
Are You Afraid of the Dark?	1990	2000	7	91	–
Beyond Belief: Fact or Fiction	1997	2002	4	45	–
Black Mirror	2011	Present	6	27	British series
Castle Rock	2018	2019	2	20	–
Channel Zero	2016	2018	4	24	–
Chiller	1995	1995	1	5	–
Darknet	2013	2014	1	6	–
Dark Realm	2001	2001	1	13	–
Deadtime Stories	2012	2013	1	11	–
Dimension 404	2017	2017	1	6	–
Electric Dreams	2017	2018	1	10	–
Exposure	2000	2002	2	42	–
Fantasy Island	1977	1984	7	152	Includes 2 Movies
Fear and Fancy	1953	1953	1	15	–
Fear Itself	2008	2008	1	13	–
The Fearing Mind	2000	2000	1	12	–
Freddy's Nightmares – A Nightmare on Elm Street: The Series	1988	1990	2	44	–
Ghost Stories	1997	1998	1	44	–
Ghost Story	1972	1973	1	22	23 total includes 1 Pilot
Goosebumps	1995	1998	4	74	–
Great Ghost Tales	1961	1961	1	12	–
Guillermo del Toro's Cabinet of Curiosities	2022	2022	1	8	–
A Haunting	2005	2022	10	105	Stopped in 2007 and returned in 2012
The Haunting	2018	2020	2	19	–
Historias para no dormir	1966	1982	3	29	–
The Hunger	1997	2000	2	44	British/Canadian Series
Infinity Train	2019	Present	4	40	–
Inside No 9	2014	2024	9	55	–
Into the Dark	2018	2021	2	24	–
Journey to the Unknown	1968	1969	1	17	–
Lee Martin's The Midnight Hour	2008	2015			–
Lights Out	1946	1952			–
Lore	2017	2018	2	12	–
Love, Death & Robots	2019	Present	3	35	–
Masters of Horror	2005	2007	2	26	–
Masters of Science Fiction	2007	2007	1	6	–
Métal Hurlant Chronicles	2012	2014	2	12	–
Monsterland	2020	2020	1	8	–
Monsters	1988	1991	3	72	–
Mystery and Imagination	1966	1970	5	24	British series
Night Gallery	1970	1973	3	43	–
Night Visions	2001	2001	1	13	–
The Nightmare Room	2001	2002	1	13	–
Nightmare Cafe	1992	1992	1	6	–
Nightmares & Dreamscapes: From the Stories of Stephen King	2006	2006	1	8	–
Out of the Unknown	1965	1971	4	49	British series
Out of This World	1962	1962	1	13	British series
Out There	1951	1952	1	12	–
The Outer Limits	1963	1965	2	49	–
The Outer Limits	1995	2002	7	154	–
Perversions of Science	1997	1997	1	10	–
Play for Tomorrow	1981	1981	1	6	British series
Quinn Martin's Tales of the Unexpected	1977	1977	1	8	Not to be confused with the British series (below)
The Ray Bradbury Theater	1985	1992	6	65	–
R.L. Stine's The Haunting Hour	2010	2014	4	76	–
Room 104	2017	2020	4	48	–
Science Fiction Theatre	1955	1957	2	78	–
Scream	2015	2019	3	30	–
Slasher	2016	Present	3	24	–
Strange Stories	1956	1956	–	–	–
Tales from the Darkside	1984	1988	4	89	Plus 1 Pilot
Tales from the Crypt	1989	1996	7	93	–
Tales of Mystery	1961	1963	3	29	–
Tales of Mystery and Imagination	1995	1995	1	13	–
Tales of the Unexpected	1979	1988	9	112	British series unconnected with the Quinn Martin series (above)
Tales of Tomorrow	1951	1953	2	85	–
The Terror	2018	2019	2	20	–
Thriller	1960	1962	2	67	–
Trapped	1950	1951	–	–	–
The Twilight Zone (original series)	1959	1964	5	156	–
The Twilight Zone (revival series)	1985	1989	3	65	–
The Twilight Zone (revival series)	2002	2003	1	43	–
The Twilight Zone (revival series)	2019	2020	2	20	–
The Unexpected	1952	1952	–	–	–
Urban Gothic	2000	2001	2	22	–
The Veil	1958	1958	1	11	–
Way Out	1961	1961	1	14	–
Welcome to Paradox	1998	1998	1	13	–
What If...?	2021	2024	3	26	–
Star Wars: Visions	2021	Present	3	27	–

=== Westerns ===
Title	Started	Ended	Seasons	Episodes	Notes
Frontier Theatre	1950	1950	–	–	No episodes are known to have survived.
Death Valley Days	1952	1970	18	452	–
Frontier	1955	1956	1	31	–
Zane Grey Theater	1956	1961	5	149	–
Cheyenne	1957	1962	7	107	–
Dead Man's Gun	1997	1999	2	44	–

== Film ==
Anthology film series are rare compared to their TV and radio counterparts. There have been several attempts within the horror genre to have a franchise with an anthology format, such as with the Halloween franchise where the third film, Halloween III: Season of the Witch, was meant to be the beginning of a series of anthology horror films, but due to negative reception that plan was shelved.

=== Drama series ===
Title	Started	Ended	Instalments	Notes
Cities of Love	2006	N/A	5	

=== Genre ===
Title	Started	Ended	Instalments	Notes
Carry On...	1958	1992	31	Comedy series which used the same roster of comedic actors and comedians
Yagyu Chronicles	1961	1964	9	Composed of two versions of the "Yagyu Bugeicho" novel by Kosuke Gomi (films #1–2 and films #4–8) and two stand-alone stories (film #3 and film #9).
Shinobi no Mono	1962	1970	9	Composed of five unrelated stories/characters. Story 1 (films #1–3), story 2 (films #4–5, 7), story 3 (film #6), story 4 (film #8), story 5 (film #9).
Seventeen Ninja	1963	1966	2	Composed of Seventeen Ninja (十七人の忍者) and the in-name-only sequel Seventeen Ninja: The Great Battle (十七人の忍者 大血戦).
The Bloodthirsty Trilogy	1970	1974	3	
The Ninja Trilogy	1981	1984	3	Composed of Enter the Ninja, Revenge of the Ninja, and Ninja III: The Domination.
Shake, Rattle & Roll	1984	2025	17	
Hanna-Barbera Superstars 10	1987	1988	10	The series of syndicated animated television films produced by Hanna-Barbera, as part of The Funtastic World of Hanna-Barbera programming block.
Gonin	1995	1996	2	Composed of Gonin and the in-name-only sequel Gonin 2.
Three Flavours Cornetto trilogy	2004	2013	3	
Cloverfield	2008	N/A	3	

== Video games ==
Anthology video games have been rare since the 1980s. Compilations or package video games (e.g. Castlevania Anniversary Collection) are not included.

Title	Started	Ended	Installments	Notes
Amnesia	2010	N/A	4	Each game features different protagonists in different countries in different time settings, such as an amnesiac man in Prussia (1839) or a butcher in London (1899).
Far Cry	2004	N/A	6	While taking place in the same fictional universe, each game features different protagonists, characters, locations, mechanics, etc. One game takes place in the Stone Age (Far Cry Primal) while another takes place in a retrofuturistic world (Far Cry 3: Blood Dragon).
Fatal Frame	2001	N/A	6	Each of the Fatal Frame games has a mostly standalone story in which the protagonists investigate a haunted location to learn about how it became cursed.
Fears to Fathom	2021	N/A	5	An episodic psychological horror game where each episode unveils a short story narrated by the ones who survived.
Final Fantasy	1987	N/A	16	Many games have different settings and playable characters. Each game incorporates a different fantasy genre (from high fantasy to science fantasy to dark fantasy) and a new setting, with some supporting or minor characters having recurring names (e.g. Biggs, Wedge, and Cid).
Layers of Fear	2016	N/A	3	Each game features a different protagonist in different locations, while all being connected through one big story.
Life Is Strange	2015	N/A	6	While all in the same universe, each game takes place in a different location, following the story of a different protagonist.
Resident Evil Outbreak (File #2)	2003	2004	2	A spin-off of PlayStation-era mainlines (1, 2 and 3: Nemesis); each chapter or "scenario" is set in a different location of Raccoon City, and features nonlinear gameplay.
Silent Hill	1999	N/A	10	Each game presents a different story and set of characters, but is usually set in the same titular town of Silent Hill, often following similar story elements, such as enemies manifested from negative emotions.
The Dark Pictures	2019	N/A	5	It is planned to consist of eight games, with one entry per year.
What Remains of Edith Finch	2012 (The Unfinished Swan)	N/A	2	The game What Remains of Edith Finch takes the perspective of the entire Finch family as the protagonist "Edith" goes through their history. It has been confirmed by Ian Dallas of Giant Sparrow that The Unfinished Swan is canon to What Remains of Edith Finch, as it continues the story of Edith's older brother "Milton Finch".

== See also ==
- Anthology
- Anthology film
- Limited-run series
