= Phil Tonken =

American actor

Phil Tonken (born Philip Simon Tonken; April 13, 1919 – February 4, 2000 in Washington, D.C.) was an American radio and television producer, announcer and voice-over artist.

== Early life and education ==
Tonken was born in Hartford, Connecticut, and was a graduate of City College of New York (where he majored in public speaking) and served in the United States Army during World War II.

== Career ==
He started with the Mutual Broadcasting System in the mid-1940s as an announcer via its New York City outlet, WOR radio, announcing on such shows as Passport to Romance, The Mysterious Traveler, High Adventure and Quiet, Please.

After WOR ended its long-time affiliation with Mutual in 1959, Tonken was among many New York-based Mutual staff announcers (also including Carl Warren, Russ Dunbar, Frank McCarthy and Ted Mallie)m who stayed on with the station. For a few years, he hosted a Sunday morning program on WOR, Hyacinths and Biscuits, which featured poetry readings and little vignettes. By the 1970s Tonken had moved on to the TV outlet, WOR-TV (now WWOR-TV), handling station identifications, promos, bumpers and program introductions, up to his retirement from the station in 1989. However, Tonken's voice was still heard on the station sporadically into the early 1990s at the end of movie trailers during commercial breaks, announcing the dates the movies would begin playing at theaters.

Besides his long association with WOR, Tonken was a narrator for Fox Movietone News in the 1950s and 1960s, and also was announcer for a 15-minute syndicated afternoon radio science fiction program, The Planet Man, which was in the tradition of older sci-fi radio shows such as Buck Rogers, Flash Gordon and Tom Corbett, Space Cadet. The show was produced by New York City-based Palladium Radio Productions in 1952 and aired through 1953. Seventy-eight episodes were produced, all but two of which are in existence today. Besides Tonken, only two other people were known to have participated: organist Jon Gart and voice artist Joseph Boland, who played the robot characters. The rest of the cast remains a mystery to this day.

Tonken's distinctive modulated baritone voice – once described by Jean Shepherd as sounding like "a combination of King Kong, the organ at Westminster Cathedral, and wind whistling through Mammoth Cave" – was also heard in two feature films, The Secret of Magic Island (a 1964 English language release of a 1956 French movie called Un fée... pas comme les autres) and In Search of Bigfoot (1975). In addition, for many years he did radio commercials for different products and services, including a long-running ad campaign for Barron's Magazine, as well as voice-over work for corporate and other clients. In his final years, he did some narrations for audiobooks that were put out by Outdoor Life magazine.

== Death ==
Tonken died of pancreatic cancer in Washington, D.C., aged 80.
