= The Bomb Factory =

Live music venue in Dallas

- The Bomb Factory
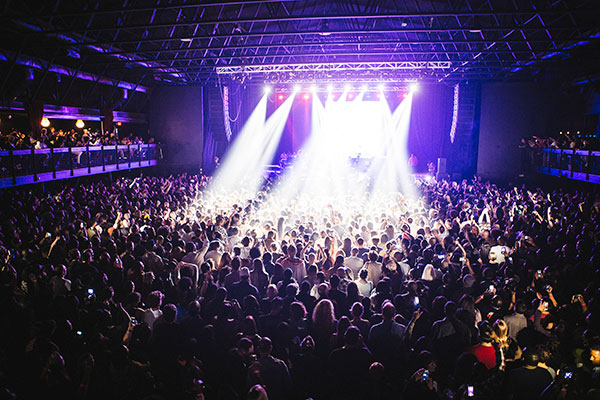
- Venue interior, 2015
- Interactive map of The Bomb Factory
- Former names: The Factory in Deep Ellum (2021–2025)
- Address: 2713 Canton Street, Dallas, Texas, U.S.
- Coordinates: 32°46′56.606″N 96°47′1.493″W
- Capacity: 1,000–4,300
- Type: Music venue
- Events: Rock, hip hop, metal, indie, electronic

Construction
- Groundbreaking: 1914
- Opened: 1993
- Renovated: 2015
- Closed: 1997–2015
- Reopened: March 26, 2015

Website
- thebombfactory.com

The Bomb Factory, formerly the Factory in Deep Ellum, is an American music venue and event space located in the Deep Ellum district of Dallas. It originally operated from 1993 to 1997 and was reopened in March 2015 under new management.

== History ==
=== 1914–1970 ===
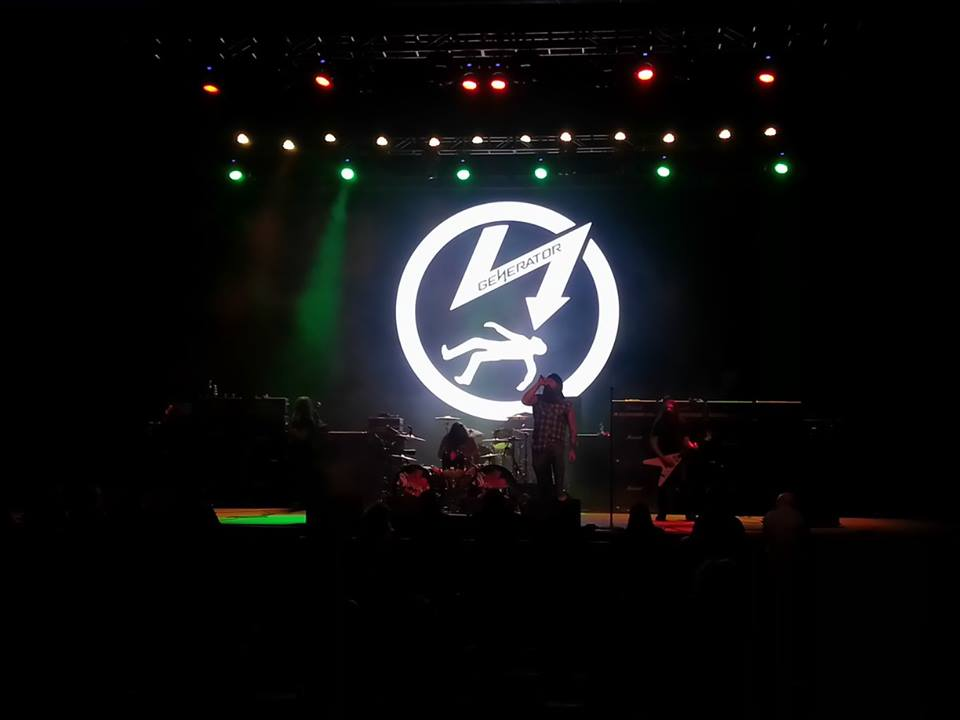
Dallas rock band Generator performing at the Bomb Factory, December 2015

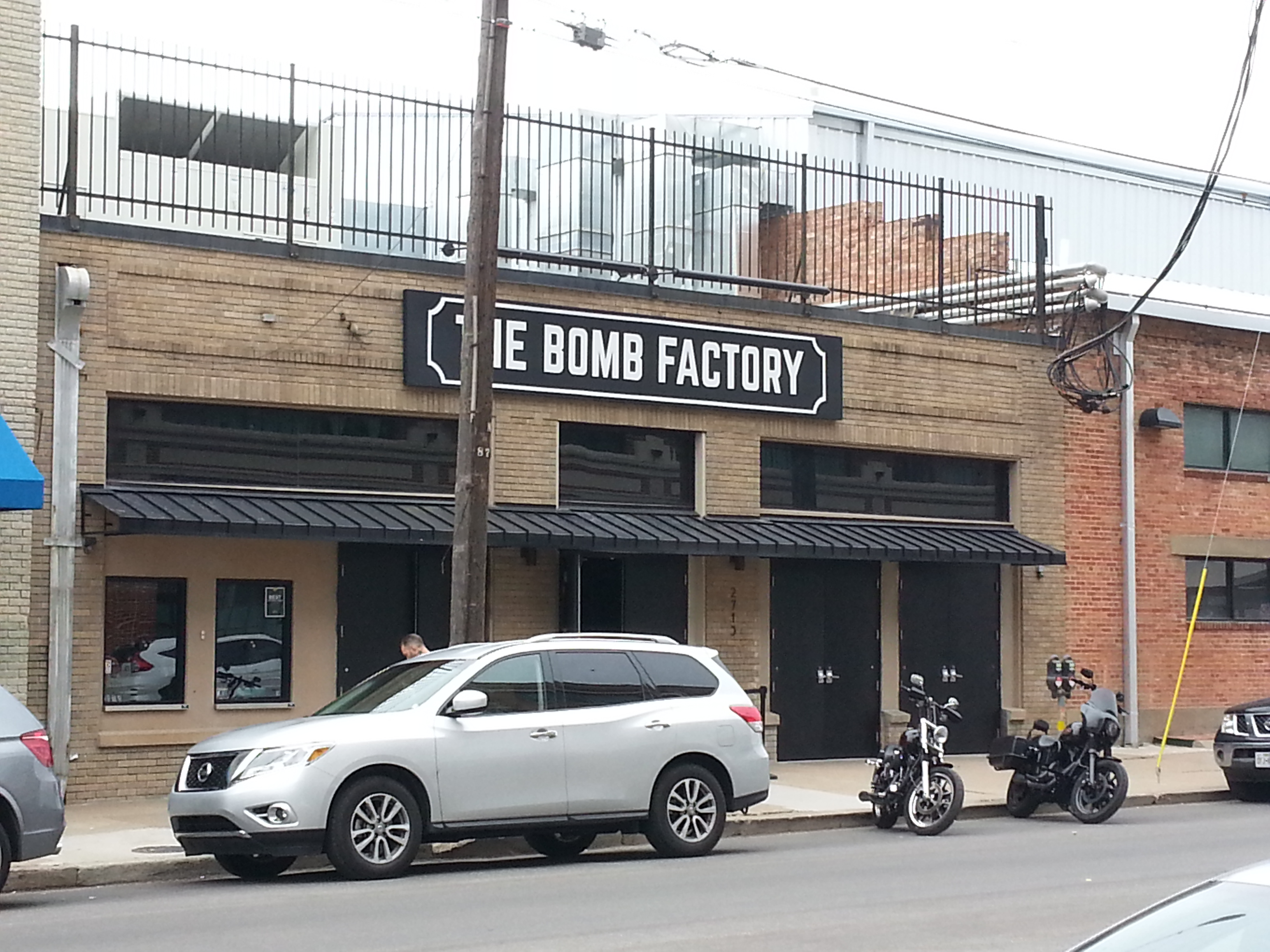
Venue exterior, November 2015

In 1914, Henry Ford acquired the site for one of his first automobile assembly plants. The plant, along with the present day Adam Hats building, remained in the 2700 block of Williams Street (now known as Canton Street) until the 1930s.

When World War II began, Ford was pushed to help the United States gear up for war. The manufacturing of automobiles ceased, as the production of jeeps, practice bombs, and ammunition for the war effort started under the new company name Mayhew Machine and Engineering Works. With an impending economic recession, the factory closed in the 1970s.

=== 1993–1997 ===
In the early 1990s, Deep Ellum attracted industrial developments, commercial storefronts, and early musical cultures such as jazz and blues. The Bomb Factory resurfaced as one of the largest music venues in the area.

The Bomb Factory opened its doors as a music venue in 1993 and hosted acts including Ramones, Sonic Youth and Phish, whose "Tweezerfest" performance at the Bomb Factory in 1994 has since become a fan favorite. The Bomb Factory also had acts including Megadeth, Korn, Fugees, Black Sabbath, Rage Against the Machine, Fugazi, INXS, Marilyn Manson, Tool, Motörhead, Nine Inch Nails, Slayer and the Dave Matthews Band during its initial run as a venue.

On August 9, 1995, the first ever run of the Warped Tour held a Dallas concert in the parking lot of the Bomb Factory. L7, Sublime, and Quicksand headlined the event with support from No Use for a Name, Sick of It All, Fluf, Seaweed, and Tilt.

Toward the end of the decade Deep Ellum took another downturn, forcing many venues and businesses to shutter its doors. The venue closed in 1997.

=== 2015–present ===
In November 2013, Westdale Asset Management announced it would be resurrecting the Bomb Factory after 15 years. The multimillion-dollar project detailed plans for a complete renovation of the space, including air conditioning, the installation of mezzanine seating, eight VIP suites, a centered stage with unobstructed views, a raised roof, and state-of-the-art lights and sound systems. Additionally, the renovation plans for backstage featured four green rooms with laundry and shower facilities. On March 26, 2015, the Bomb Factory opened its doors to the public with a sold-out grand opening concert, headlined by Erykah Badu with support from singer/songwriter Sarah Jaffe.

Since its grand opening, the 48,000-square-foot venue has had acts including the Lumineers, Sturgill Simpson, Robert Plant, Disclosure, Don Henley, Future, D'Angelo, Brand New, Hardwell, Chvrches, and Lauryn Hill. It has held events including the Elm Street Music and Tattoo Festival, as well as corporate events for Jaguar, Raising Cane's, the Dallas Observer and other companies.

In addition to booking live music, festivals, conventions, and private events, the Bomb Factory frequently hosts boxing and mixed martial arts events. On November 28, 2015, the Bomb Factory hosted the Premier Boxing Champions Super Welterweight World Championship, which was televised on NBC. Jermall Charlo and Wilky Campfort were the title fighters.

On October 31, 2017, Westdale Asset Management, reopened neighboring Deep Ellum Live as Canton Hall, an indoor music venue capable of holding up to 1,100 people. On July 12, 2021, the Bomb Factory was renamed the Factory in Deep Ellum. The Factory in Deep Ellum regained The Bomb Factory name on March 3, 2025.

==== Notable events ====
- The venue's sold-out March 2015 grand opening was headlined by Erykah Badu with support from Sarah Jaffe, both Dallas natives.
- In October 2015, Dallas hip hop legend The D.O.C. performed at the Bomb Factory for his first performance since his near-fatal car accident 20 years ago.
- The Bomb Factory hosted the second annual Rageville Music Fest on October 30, 2015, headlined by Future. The festival also featured performances by Paper Diamond, 12th Planet, AraabMuzik, and Keith Ape.
- On Tuesday, March 15, 2016, Robert Plant and his band, the Sensational Shapeshifters, performed at the Bomb Factory, with support from The Sonics. Plant performed songs from both his solo work and his time in Led Zeppelin.
- On March 29, 2016, the Dallas Mavericks hosted a Ludacris concert at the Bomb Factory, the first concert promoted by the team's event company, Another Mavericks Production. Dallas hip hop artists Cure for Paranoia, Bobby Sessions, and -topic were the support. During -topic's set, Leon Bridges, who is from Dallas, briefly joined the rapper onstage.
- Don Henley performed at the Bomb Factory on April 29, 2016, for the annual ESD Gala, a private benefit for the Episcopal School of Dallas.
- On August 11, 2016, Mark Cuban's network, AXS TV, launched a five-week concert series featuring performances by The Monkees, Bret Michaels, KC and the Sunshine Band and Bad Company. The Monkees celebrated their 50th anniversary with the show, which was free to attend and filled to capacity.

== Awards ==
- Dallas Observer Music Awards, Best New Music Venue – 2015
- D Magazine Best of Big D, Best Local Music Venue – 2015
- Dallas Observer: The 5 Best New Concert Venues in Dallas/Fort Worth – 2015
- Consequence of Sound: The 100 Greatest American Music Venues, #86 – 2016
- Dallas Observer Music Awards, Best Music Venue (over 500 capacity) – 2016
- D Magazine Best of Big D, Best Live Music Venue – 2016
