= Waters of the Moon =

1951 play by N. C. Hunter

Waters of the Moon is a 1951 stage play by N. C. Hunter which originally ran for two years at the Theatre Royal Haymarket from April 1951 to May 1953. It was adapted into a 1961 TV play broadcast by the Australian Broadcasting Corporation. This version was directed by Christopher Muir. In 1978 it was revived at the Theatre Royal Haymarket with Ingrid Bergman as Helen Lancaster and Wendy Hiller, who had appeared in the original 1951 production, now playing the role of Mrs. Whyte.

It was also televised by ITV (H.M. Tennent for ATV) on 14 November 1956, in the Play of the Week strand and by the BBC on 27 December 1959, 24 December 1968 and 30 December 1983.

== Cast (original West End stage - 1951) ==
- Edith Evans as Helen Lancaster
- Sybil Thorndike as Mrs. Whyte
- Wendy Hiller as Evelyn Daly
- Directed by Frith Banbury

== Cast (BBC Radio version - 1955) ==
- Sonia Dresdel as Helen Lancaster
- Directed by Val Gielgud

== 1961 Australian Television Version ==
Waters of the Moon
- Based on: play by N. C. Hunter
- Written by: Wal Cherry
- Directed by: Christopher Muir
- Country of origin: Australia
- Original language: English

Production
- Running time: 60 mins
- Production company: ABC

Original release
- Network: ABC
- Release: 19 April 1961 (Melbourne, live)
- Release: 28 June 1961 (Sydney)
- Release: 23 August 1961 (Brisbane)

The play was adapted for Australian TV by the ABC. It was directed by Christopher Muir.

=== Premise ===
A woman, Helen Lancaster, is caught in a house during a snowstorm and forced to spend time there with her husband and daughter.

Helen flirts with an Austrian, Julias.

=== Cast ===
- Patricia Kennedy as Helen Lancaster
- Barbara Brandon as Mrs Whyte
- Kurt Ludeski as Julias Wintelhalter
- Leslie Pope as Evelyn Daly
- Robin Hardiman as John Daly
- Cyril Gardiner as Colonel Selby
- Agnes Dobson as Mrs Daly
- Myrtle Woods as Mrs Ashworth
- Jane Norris as Tonetti Landi
- Michael Duffield as Robert Lancaster
- Ric Hutton
- Leonard Teale
- Anne Haddy
- Jack Ford
- James Workman

=== Production ===
It was Patricia Kennedy's first TV play since Black Limelight.

== Cast (BBC Radio version - 1965) ==
- Coral Browne as Helen Lancaster
- Virginia Maskell as Evelyn Daly
- Mary O'Farrell as Mrs. Whyte
- Dorothy Holmes Gore as Mrs. Ashworth
- Gerard Heinz as Julias Wintelhalter
- Martin Lewis as Colonel Selby
- Anna Burden as Mrs. Daly
- Patrick Barr as Robert Lancaster
- Peter Marinka as John Daly
- Eva Hadden as Tonetta Landi

== Cast (BBC1 version - 1968) ==
- Margaret Leighton as Helen Lancaster
- Vivien Merchant as Evelyn Daly
- Athene Seyler as Mrs. Whyte
- Kathleen Harrison as Mrs. Ashworth
- Michael Gwynn as Julius Winterhalter
- Roland Culver as Colonel Selby
- Produced by Cedric Messina
- Directed by Herbert Wise

== Cast (BBC1 version - 1983) ==
- Penelope Keith as Helen Lancaster
- Virginia McKenna as Mrs. Whyte
- Ronald Pickup as Julius Winterhalter
- Joan Sims as Mrs. Ashworth
- Richard Vernon as Colonel Selby
- Dilys Laye as Mrs. Daly
- Geoffrey Palmer as Robert Lancaster
- Lesley Dunlop as Evelyn Daly
- Phoebe Nicholls as Tonetta Landi
- Produced by Cedric Messina
- Directed by Piers Haggard
