= Dr. Weird =

Dr. Weird may refer to:

- Dr. Weird (Aqua Teen Hunger Force), a character from the animated series Aqua Teen Hunger Force
- Dr. Weird (comics), a character from the fanzine Star Studded Comics that was later incorporated into Big Bang Comics
- The Strange Dr. Weird, a 1940s radio series
