= Adam Hats =

American hat manufacturer

Adam Hats Corporation was an American manufacturer and retailer of hats. It was founded in 1924 by Elias Lustig and expanded until it eventually operated between 87 and 97 retail stores across the United States. Adam Hats were also distributed to authorized Adam Hat agents. These agents were department stores which were not owned nor operated by Adam Hats.

== History ==
Adam Hats manufactured and sold a variety of budget-priced hats, including the traditional fedora, and pork pie hat. In late spring of each year, Adam Hats promoted straw hats for the summer. Two of their models were The Executive and The Major; the last being "The hat of the month for September", and cost $3.25.

In the late 1940s/early 1950s, a Frank Moore was the Adam Hats General Sales Manager. Abraham (Chippy) Levy was the Head Window Dresser in 1935. In the late 1940s, a successor to Levy was Irving Rubenstein.

In the 1940s, the New York–based Adam Hats was a sponsor of radio broadcasts of boxing matches which were held at Madison Square Garden. The boxing matches were called by radio announcer Sam Taub. Adam Hats also sponsored a radio program, The Strange Dr. Weird, on the Mutual Network from 1944 to 1945. Most of these programs, complete with the Adam Hats commercials, are archived. Their famous radio jingle was "I go for a man who wears an Adam hat". Adam Hats distributed a series of matchbook covers commonly known as "Sam Taubs Ring Personalities". The inside of each matchbook in the series had a biographical summary of a well known boxer of the era.

Adam Hats spared no expense in advertising, often using the celebrities of the thirties and forties in their advertising materials. Advertising materials included matchbooks, celebrity 8x10 photos, magazine ads, radio commercials, newsboy aprons, and numerous other items including one of the earliest television commercials in July, 1941. A series of Adam Hat matchbooks from 1942 was a contest for people to try to win a free hat. Each matchbook in the series had a celebrity photo, and six names below the photo. If one of those names was the celebrity in the photo, then that was a winning matchbook.

They sponsored the radio show The Mysterious Traveler (5/12/'43–16/9/'52). 75 of the 370 shows still exist, some of which have been released on audio cassette. They also sponsored The Strange Dr. Weird (1944–'45), broadcast on Mutual and narrated by Maurice Tarplin.

Adam Hat stores had meticulously decorated window displays. The outside of their stores were trimmed around the edges with stained wood, and the store logo showed the name "Adam" in big block letters.

Lustig sold the company in 1954 to an entity called Leitman, owned by investor Harold Leitman. In 1958, Lustig died of cancer in Scarsdale, New York. In 1955, Miller Brothers purchased the manufacturing and wholesale segments of the company.

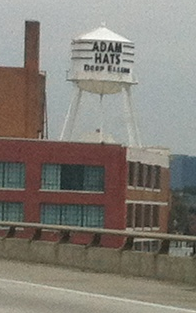
The water tower of Adam Hats, a building now converted to apartments, just east of Interstate 45/US 75 in Dallas, Texas.

Miller Brothers was based in Dallas, Texas, where an old Adam Hats facility has been re-developed into residential property, still called the Adam Hats lofts. Dallas-based Miller Brothers Executive Benjamin Parrill became Adam Hats President in 1955. Parrill died in 2007.

In the 1950s, Miller Brothers introduced miniature hat boxes with miniature hats. These novelty items were used as gift certificates, to be redeemed for a hat.

== Adam Hats in feature films ==
In the movie Cinderella Man (2005), there is a quick camera shot depicting the front of Madison Square Garden in the 1930s, with an Adam Hats store next door to it.

In the movie Non-Stop New York (1937), as the movie begins they are celebrating New Year's Eve 1938 in Times Square. People are parading down the street and pass directly in front of an Adam Hats store.

== Co-promotion with Lincoln Mercury Automobiles ==
With the introduction of the Mercury Cougar in late 1966, Adam Hats produced a "Cougar"-styled hat which contained a small Mercury Cougar emblem on the band of the fedora.
