= Murder by Experts (radio series) =

American radio mystery-detective dramatic series (1949–1951)

Murder by Experts is an American mystery-detective dramatic radio series that was on the Mutual Broadcasting System from June 18, 1949, to December 17, 1951. The show was recognized as Best Mystery Radio Program in 1950.

== Overview ==
Author John Dickson Carr was the initial host of Murder by Experts. In each episode he introduced "a mystery chosen as outstanding for the week". Brett Halliday became the host later in the series. Each episode included a well-known author as the "guest expert", introducing one of his or her favorite mystery stories. These included Dorothy Salisbury Davis, Hugh Pentecost, and Frank Gruber.

== Episodes ==
Partial List of Episodes of Murder by Experts
Date	Story	Author
July 18, 1949	"The Creeper"	Joe Russell
July 25, 1949	"The Big Money"	Andrew Phillips
August 1, 1949	"Five Bullets for Baldwin"	—
August 15, 1949	"Dig Your Own Grave"	—
August 22, 1949	"Heavy Hangs the Head"	—
August 29, 1949	"It's Luck That Counts"	—
September 5, 1949	"Return Trip"	—
September 12, 1949	"I Dreamed I Died"	Joseph Ruscoll
March 13, 1950	"The Four Fatal Jugglers"	Paul Monash
July 24, 1950	"The Third Witness"	Joseph Ruscoll
August 7, 1950	"With Malice Toward One"	—
October 3, 1950	"A Hard Bargain"	Jane Speed (Note: Although the initial November 1947 "Hard Bargain" purchase had been made by CBS for use on Suspense, Speed had the misfortune of making that sale just as CBS was in flux, facing what seemed imminent cancellation. Their solution unfortunately entailed expansion of the program's running time to sixty minutes (implemented January 1948, abandoned just over six months later); hence, the network's "HB" Plan B, shifting Speed's script to its long-running, otherwise comparable, but still half-hour-sized crime series, The Whistler.)
January 15, 1951	"All Damages Covered"	—
January 22, 1951	"Solo Performance"	—
January 29, 1951	"The Affair At Stony Ridge"	—
February 12, 1951	"Deadly Nuisance"	—
February 19, 1951	"Nightmare"	Daniel Papish
March 5, 1951	"Package for Emily"	—
March 12, 1951	"Drop Dead"	—
March 19, 1951	"Death Rings Down the Curtain"	—
March 26, 1951	"The Amazing Gabel"	George and Gertrude Fass
April 2, 1951	"Blind-man's Bluff"	—
April 16, 1951	"The Silent City"	Gilbert Thomas
April 23, 1951	"Your Devoted Wife"	—
April 30, 1951	"The Dead Can't Testify"	—
May 21, 1951	"Filler to Adventure"	—
June 4, 1951	"Dark Moon"	John W. Hart
June 11, 1951	"Reluctant Witness"	Budd Lesser
July 23, 1951	"Two Birds With One Stone"	—
September 10, 1951	"My Silent Companions"	—
October 1, 1951	"The Lonely Road"	—
October 22, 1951	"Killer at Large"	—
October 29, 1951	"The Intruder"	—
November 26, 1951	"What's In It For Me?"	—

== Production ==
Phil Tonkin was the announcer, and Emerson Buckley provided music. Bob Arthur and Dave Kogan adapted the stories for radio and produced the series. The program was sustaining. Murder by Experts was the third in a two-hour series of four mystery programs, part of the block programming approach that was used by Mutual then. Straight Arrow began the block at 8 p.m. Eastern Time, with The Affairs of Peter Salem following immediately. Secret Missions concluded the block.

== Critical response ==
A review of the premiere episode in the trade publication Variety called Murder by Experts "a slick moderately-budged whodunit with good scripting and production values". It said that Carr "brought a warm, informal manner to the role of host."

== Recognition ==
In 1950 the program received the Edgar Award for Best Mystery Radio Program from the Mystery Writers of America organization. The award was presented on the show's April 24, 1950, broadcast. It and The Mysterious Traveler were runners-up in the same category in 1951.
