= River of No Return =

1954 film by Otto Preminger

- Theatrical release poster
- Directed by: Otto Preminger
- Written by: Louis Lantz
- Screenplay by: Frank Fenton
- Story by: Louis Lantz
- Produced by: Stanley Rubin
- Starring: Robert Mitchum; Marilyn Monroe; Tommy Rettig; Rory Calhoun
- Cinematography: Joseph LaShelle
- Edited by: Louis R. Loeffler
- Music by: Cyril J. Mockridge
- Color process: Technicolor
- Production company: 20th Century-Fox
- Distributed by: 20th Century-Fox
- Release date: April 30, 1954
- Running time: 91 minutes
- Country: United States
- Language: English
- Budget: $2,200,000
- Box office: $3.8 million

River of No Return is a 1954 American Western film directed by Otto Preminger and starring Robert Mitchum and Marilyn Monroe. The screenplay by Frank Fenton is based on a story by Louis Lantz, who borrowed his premise from the 1948 Italian film Bicycle Thieves. The picture was shot on location in the Canadian Rockies in Technicolor and CinemaScope and released by 20th Century Fox.

== Plot ==
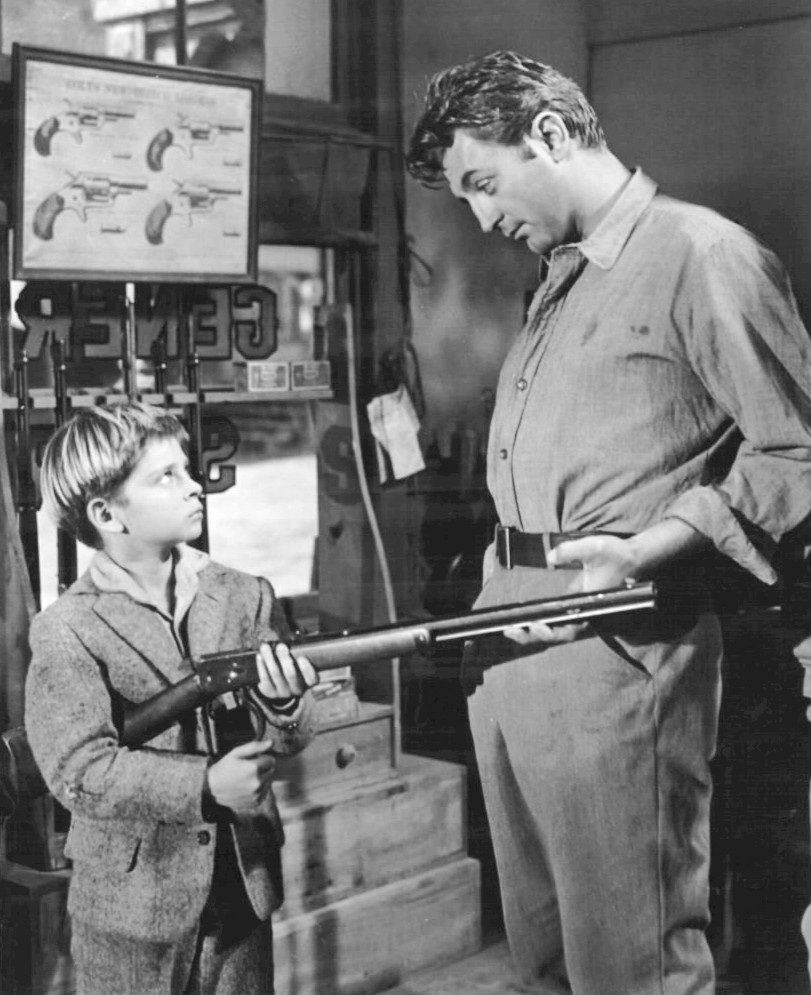
Robert Mitchum with Tommy Rettig in a scene from the film

Set in the Northwestern United States in 1875, the film focuses on taciturn widower Matt Calder, who has recently been released from prison for killing a man while defending another. He arrives in a boomtown tent city to find his nine-year-old son Mark, who had been left with dance hall singer Kay after the man Matt hired to deliver him abandoned the boy. Matt promises Mark a life of hunting, fishing, and farming on their homestead.

When Kay's fiancé, gambler Harry Weston wins a deed to a gold mine in a poker game, they head to Council City on a raft to file the claim. They encounter trouble in the rapids near the Calder farm, but Matt and Mark rescue them. Harry offers to "buy" Matt's rifle and horse to reach Council City, saying he will pay when he returns. When Matt refuses, Harry knocks Matt unconscious and takes the horse and rifle. Kay says she will stay behind to tend to injured Matt. Harry agrees, as he will travel quicker without her; he leaves, promising to return.

When hostile Indians attack the farm, the three escape on Harry's raft. They set up camp by the river, and Matt and Kay argue about pursuing Harry. Mark overhears their conversation, and that Matt has been in prison for murder. Matt tells Mark he killed a man to protect his friend.

As their journey continues, Kay appreciates Matt's bravery and how he protects Mark and her. They are forced to deal with strong rapids, Kay getting hypothermia, a mountain lion attack, two gold prospectors hunting Harry for stealing their claim, and a second Indian war party.

They arrive in Council City and confront Harry. Harry shoots at Matt, prompting Mark to shoot Harry in the back, using a rifle that he was inspecting in the general store; just as his father had shot a man years before.

Kay finds a job at the local saloon. While she is performing, Matt walks into the saloon and throws Kay over his shoulder to take her back to his farm along with Mark. She happily leaves with him. Kay throws her showgirl shoes from their buckboard into the street, saying goodbye to her old life.

== Cast ==
- Robert Mitchum as Matt Calder
- Marilyn Monroe as Kay Weston
- Tommy Rettig as Mark Calder
- Rory Calhoun as Harry Weston
- Douglas Spencer as Sam Benson
- Murvyn Vye as Dave Colby
- Hank Mann as townsman (uncredited)
- Will Wright as trader (uncredited)
- Don Beddoe as Ben (uncredited)
- Hal Baylor as young punk (uncredited)
- Ed Hinton as gambler (uncredited)
- Claire Andre as Surrey driver (uncredited)
- Jack Mather as dealer at craps table (uncredited)
- Edmund Cobb as barber (uncredited)

== Production ==
=== Pre-production ===
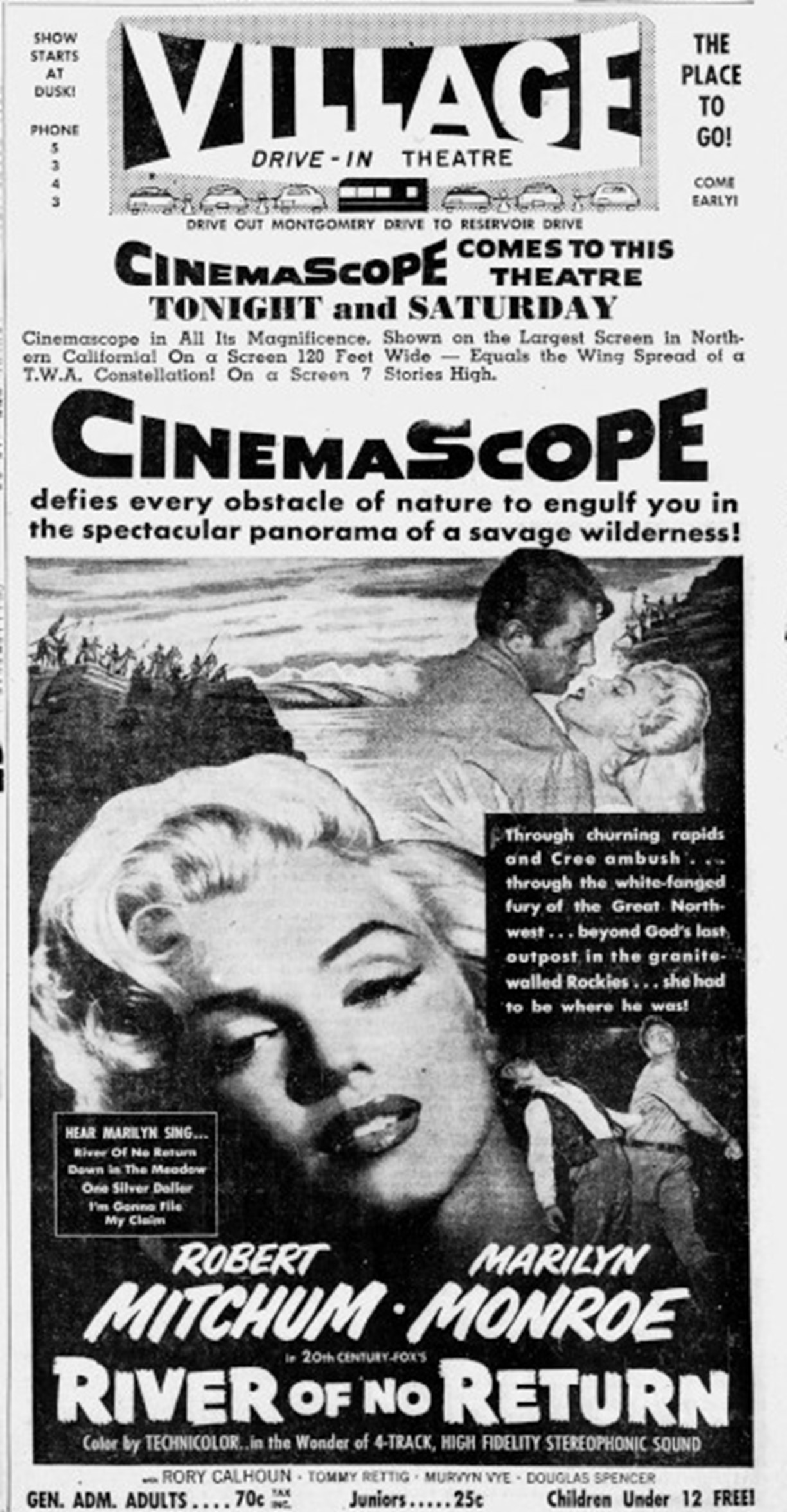
Drive-in advertisement from 1954

Otto Preminger was preparing for the opening of The Moon Is Blue when 20th Century Fox executive Darryl F. Zanuck assigned him to direct River of No Return as part of his contract with the studio. Because of their previous experience with Westerns, producer Stanley Rubin had wanted William Wellman, Raoul Walsh, or Henry King to helm the film, and he was concerned Preminger, who he felt was better suited for film noir melodrama or sophisticated comedy, would be unable to rise to the task of directing a piece of Americana. Preminger himself had no interest in the project until he read the screenplay and saw potential in the story. He also approved of Robert Mitchum and Marilyn Monroe, who already had been cast in the lead roles.

Zanuck decided the film should be made in CinemaScope and increased the budget accordingly. Much of it would be filmed in Banff and Jasper national parks, Lake Louise in Alberta, and the Salmon River in Idaho, where the story actually takes place. Director Preminger and producer Rubin flew to the area to scout locations. During their time there, Rubin grew fond of the director and began to feel that rather than viewing it as a contractual obligation, Preminger had a real interest in making the film.

Rubin scheduled 12 weeks of preproduction, during which Monroe rehearsed and recorded the songs written by Ken Darby and Lionel Newman, and 45 days for filming.

=== Filming ===
The cast and crew departed for Calgary in late June 1953. From there, they traveled by special train to the Banff Springs Hotel, which served as their base during the Canadian filming.

Monroe was accompanied by Natasha Lytess, her acting coach. Preminger clashed with the coach from the very start. She insisted on taking her client aside and giving her direction contrary to that of Preminger's, and she had the actress enunciating each syllable of every word of dialogue with exaggerated emphasis. Preminger called Rubin in Los Angeles and insisted Lytess be banned from the set, but when the producer complied with his demand, Monroe called Zanuck directly and asserted she could not continue unless Lytess returned. Zanuck commiserated with Preminger, but feeling Monroe was a major box-office draw he could not afford to upset, he reinstated Lytess. Angered by the decision, Preminger directed his rage at Monroe for the rest of the production.

During the difficult shoot, Preminger also had to contend with frequent rain, Mitchum's heavy drinking, and an injury to Monroe's ankle that kept her off the set for several days and ultimately put her in a cast. Monroe nearly drowned while filming. She had donned chest-high hip waders during rehearsal to protect her costume. She slipped on a rock, the waders filled with water, and she was unable to rise. Mitchum and others jumped in the river to rescue her, but her ankle was sprained as a result. Young Tommy Rettig seemed to be the director's sole source of solace. He respected Rettig's professionalism and appreciated the rapport he developed with Monroe, which often helped keep her on an even keel. When Lytess began to interfere with Rettig's performance, thereby undermining his confidence, Preminger let the cast and crew know about her behavior and was delighted to find they finally began to support him in his efforts to remove her from the set.

In early September, filming shifted to Los Angeles for interior scenes and close-ups for a river sequence. The latter was filmed in a tank, whereas stunt doubles were used in the long shots filmed on location in Idaho in the actual River of No Return, the Salmon River. Monroe was on crutches, and Preminger had to work around her as much as possible. Despite frequent disagreements with Rubin, Preminger completed the film on September 29, on schedule and within the budget.

This movie was the first to be filmed in CinemaScope in Canada. River of No Return was the first film released by 20th Century-Fox to feature the "CinemaScope Extension" fanfare before the opening credits. Written by Alfred Newman, it is a rerecording of his original 1933 fanfare, with the extra few bars that play under the credit "20th Century-Fox presents A CinemaScope Production". After Fox switched to Panavision in 1967, they went back to their old fanfare, so the extension fanfare was not used again until it was revived by George Lucas to play before the opening credits to Star Wars. This time, those few extra bars played under the credit "A Lucasfilm Production". Since then, it has been re-recorded a few times, but remains to this day the introduction to every film released by that studio.

Veteran circus animal trainer Pat Anthony stood in for Robert Mitchum's character for the cougar attack scene.

=== Post-production ===
During post-production, Preminger departed for Europe, leaving editor Louis R. Loeffler and Rubin to complete the film. Jean Negulesco was called in to film a few retakes. The dailies reconfirmed Rubin's belief that Preminger had been the wrong choice for the project. He felt the director had failed to capture the Western aura, had ignored key elements in the plot, and had perfunctorily directed action sequences, leaving them looking staged and static. In several cases, studio and location shots did not match.

Preminger's experience on the film convinced him he never wanted to work as a studio employee again, and he paid Fox $150,000 to cancel the remainder of his contract.

In later years, Monroe claimed River of No Return was her worst film, and Preminger spoke bitterly about her in numerous interviews. In January 1980, when being interviewed for the New York Daily News, he finally conceded, "She tried very hard, and when people try hard, you can't be mad at them."

== Release ==
The River of No Return had its world premiere in Denver, Colorado, on April 29, 1954, and was released theatrically in the United States in New York City on April 30, 1954, and in Los Angeles on May 5.

=== Home media ===
20th Century Fox Home Entertainment released the film on Region 1 DVD on May 14, 2002. It is in anamorphic widescreen format with audio tracks in English and French and subtitles in English and Spanish. In the United States, 20th Century Fox released the film on Blu-ray disc on July 31, 2012, for the first time, with the original theatrical trailer as the sole extra feature.

== Reception ==
=== Critical response ===
On the review aggregator website Rotten Tomatoes, 60% of 15 critics' reviews are positive.

Bosley Crowther of the New York Times observed, "It is a toss-up whether the scenery or the adornment of Marilyn Monroe is the feature of greater attraction in River of No Return ... The mountainous scenery is spectacular, but so, in her own way, is Miss Monroe. The patron's preference, if any, probably will depend upon which he's interested in. Certainly, scriptwriter Frank Fenton has done the best he could to arrange for a fairly equal balance of nature and Miss Monroe ... And that should not be too lightly taken. For Director Otto Preminger has thrown all the grandeur and menace of these features upon the eye-filling CinemaScope screen. A sickening succession of rapids, churned into boiling foam, presents a display of nature's violence that cannot help but ping the patron's nerves. The raft tumbling through these rapids is quite a sight to see. And layouts of Rocky Mountain landscapes are handsome in color, too. But Mr. Mitchum's and the audience's attention is directed to Miss Monroe through frequent and liberal posing of her in full and significant views."

Variety said, "The competition between scenic splendors of the Jasper and Banff National Parks and entertainment values finds the former finishing slightly ahead on merit, although there's enough rugged action and suspense moments to get the production through its footage. In between the high spots, Otto Preminger's directorial pacing is inclined to lag, so the running time seems overlong."

TV Guide rated it 3 1/2 out of four stars, calling it "a simple, frequently charming, and beautifully photographed film blessed with fine performances and great teamwork from Robert Mitchum and Marilyn Monroe" and "an enjoyable, engaging little Western that never fails to entertain."

Film4 called it a "patchy drama which owes more to its gorgeous scenery and musical numbers than it does to anything else ... The plot doesn't convince, but Monroe, at the peak of her career, is more than easy on the eye ... Despite some pretty locations and occasional tension, there's little going on. A shallow river indeed."
