= Tommy Rettig =

American child actor (1941–1996)

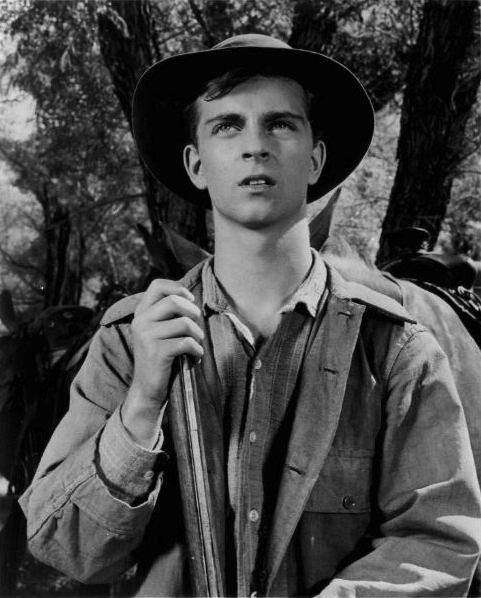
- Former child actor Tommy Rettig in syndicated anthology Western TV series Death Valley Days in 1962
- Born: Thomas Noel Rettig; December 10, 1941; Queens, New York, U.S.
- Died: February 15, 1996 (aged 54); Marina del Rey, California, U.S.
- Occupations: Actor; software engineer; author
- Years active: 1946–1994
- Spouse: Darlene Portwood (m. 1959–1977)

Thomas Noel Rettig (December 10, 1941 – February 15, 1996) was an American child actor, computer software engineer, and author. He portrayed Jeff Miller in the first three seasons of CBS's Lassie television series, from 1954 to 1957, later seen in syndicated re-runs with the title Jeff's Collie. He also played the young orphan adopted by British star David Niven in an episode of the TV anthology series Four Star Playhouse (Season 1, episode 13) entitled "No Identity." He then co-starred with another former child actor, Tony Dow, in the mid-1960s television teen soap opera Never Too Young and recorded the song by that title with singing group The TR-4.

== Early life and acting career ==
Rettig was born to a Jewish father, Elias Rettig, and a Christian Italian-American mother, Rosemary Nibali, in Jackson Heights in the Queens borough of New York City. He started his acting career at the age of six on tour with star Mary Martin in the musical Annie Get Your Gun, in which he played Little Jake.

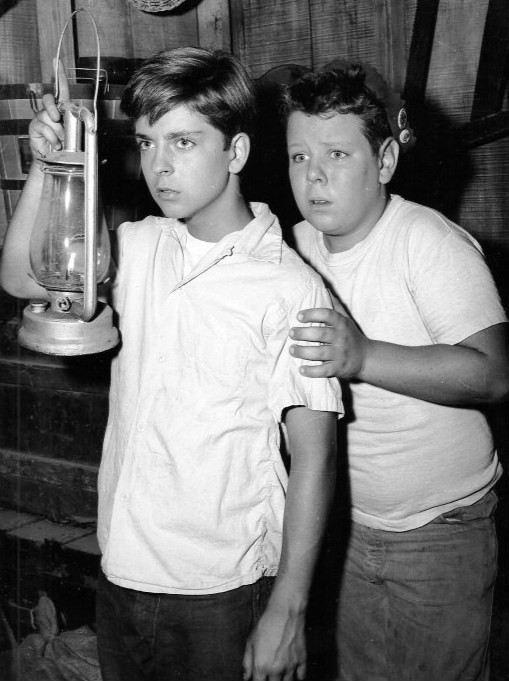
Child actors Rettig (left) as Jeff Miller, with Donald Keeler as friend Porky, in the first version (1954–1957) of the CBS television series Lassie (1956)

Rettig was selected from among 500 boys auditioning for the role of Jeff Miller to star as the first dog owner in the first version Lassie television series from 1954 to 1957. His character was a young farm boy who lived with his widowed mother, Ellen (Jan Clayton 1917–1983), grandfather (George Cleveland, 1885–1957), and beloved collie, Lassie.

In addition to his famous role as Jeff Miller in the Lassie television series on the CBS network, Rettig appeared in 17 other feature films, including So Big (1953), The 5,000 Fingers of Dr. T. (1953), written by famed children's books author Dr. Seuss, and then in River of No Return (1954), with Marilyn Monroe and Robert Mitchum. It was his work with a dog in The 5000 Fingers of Dr. T. that led animal trainer Rudd Weatherwax to urge him to audition for the Lassie role, for which Weatherwax had also supplied the collie.

Rettig later told interviewers that he longed for a life as a normal teenager, and after four seasons, he was able to get out of his contract. He was also critical of the treatment and compensation of child actors of his day. He reportedly received no residual payments from his several years of work in the Lassie series, even though the show was later very popular in syndication re-runs, widely shown under the changed title Jeff's Collie.

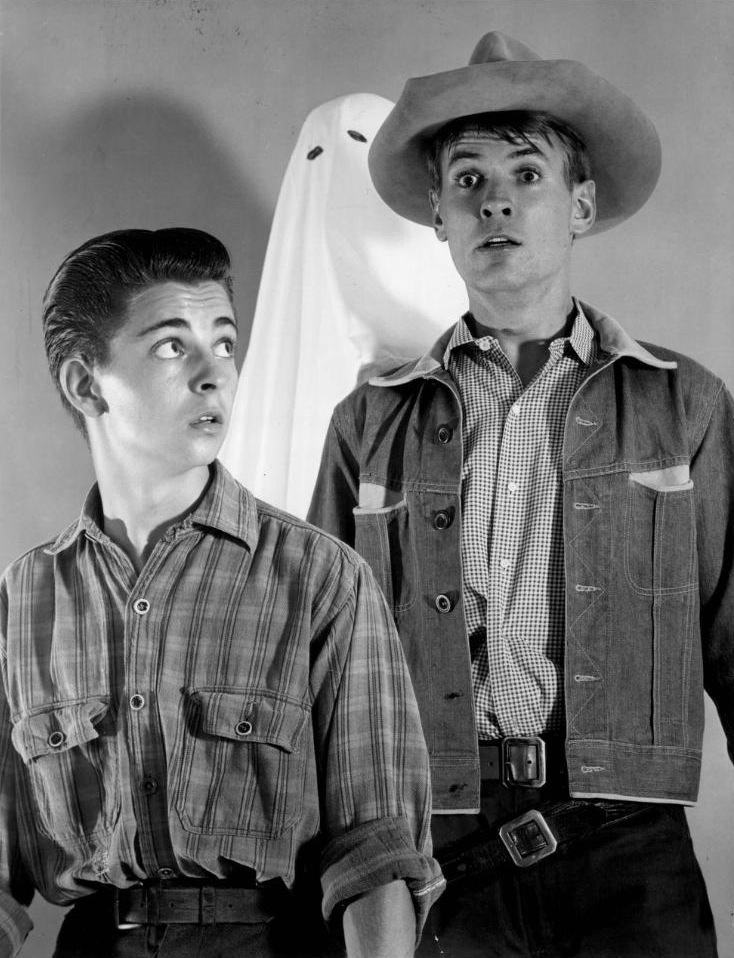
Rettig (left) with Will Hutchins in the Western TV series Sugarfoot (1958)

Rettig graduated in 1959 from University High School in Los Angeles. In the same year, at the age of 18, he was cast as Pierre in the episode "The Ghost of Lafitte", set in New Orleans, of the ABC short-lived western series The Man from Blackhawk (1959–1960), starring Robert Rockwell as a roving insurance investigator. Actress Amanda Randolph was cast in the same episode, as Auntie Cotton.

At age 19, Rettig had a prominent guest-starring role in the January 1961 Wagon Train episode "Weight of Command". Then in its fourth season on NBC, Wagon Train was the second-highest-rated prime-time series that year on American network television. The 5 ft 4 in (164.5 cm) Rettig played the part of a 16-year-old boy, Billy, who is traveling with his family on the wagon train. Although his father reluctantly allows his son to go on a buffalo hunt with assistant wagon master Bill Hawks (Terry Wilson), Billy frets that his father doesn't think of him as being a man yet. When the hunters are attacked by a band of renegade Indians, they take refuge in an empty house. Hawks manages to escape, but the wagon master Major Seth Adams (Ward Bond) makes the difficult decision not to attempt Billy's rescue, lest risking the entire wagon train to be vulnerable to attack. Hawks, who had promised Billy he would be rescued, is outraged by the decision to abandon the besieged youth to his fate. When Billy manages to survive the Indian attack on his own, he earns his father's respect.

Rettig guest-starred in the detective television series Peter Gunn as Kevin Daniels in the 1961 episode "I Know It's Murder". He played a young clairvoyant who hires Peter Gunn (Craig Stevens) to prevent the murder of his mother by her new husband, Mark Eustis, played by Hayden Rorke.

From 1965 to 1966, Rettig co-starred with another former child actor, Tony Dow (famous from Leave it to Beaver), in the ABC television soap opera for teens Never Too Young. With singing group The TR-4, he recorded the song by that title on the Velvet Tone label. While he was TR-4's co-manager, he did not sing with the group. Rettig only co-wrote the song in hopes that the TV soap would use it as the series' theme song. The record was produced by Joey Vieira, who under the stage name Donald Keeler played Rettig's sidekick Porky on "Lassie". Producers of Never Too Young, however, chose not to use it. Rettig was subsequently cast as Frank in the 1965 episode "The Firebrand" of the NBC education/high school drama series Mr. Novak (1963–1965), which starred James Franciscus.

== Post-acting career ==
As an adult, Rettig preferred to be called "Tom". He found the transition from child star to adult to be difficult, and he had several well-publicized legal entanglements related to illegal recreational drugs, a conviction for growing marijuana on his farm in 1972, and a cocaine possession charge in 1976, of which he was exonerated. Some years after leaving acting, he became a motivational speaker, which—through work on computer mailing lists—led to involvement in the early days of personal computers.

For the last 15 years of his life, Rettig was a well-known database programmer and author. He was an early employee of Ashton-Tate, specializing in (sequentially) dBASE, Clipper, FoxBASE, and, finally, FoxPro. Rettig moved to Marina del Rey, California, in the late 1980s.

== Later years and death ==
Rettig returned to television after 23 years as grown-up Jeff Miller in the final episode of the syndicated television series The New Lassie (1989–1992). The episode, titled "The Computer Study", also guest-starred Jon Provost, who had played the second Lassie owner, Timmy Martin, from 1958–1964. Rettig co-wrote "The Computer Study", which aired on March 7, 1992. The New Lassie also featured appearances from Lassie veterans Roddy McDowall (who had starred in Lassie Come Home in 1943, the first feature-length Lassie film) and June Lockhart (who starred in the 1945 sequel, Son of Lassie, and co-starred with Provost in the second version of Lassie).

On February 15, 1996, Rettig died of heart failure at age 54. He was cremated at the Inglewood Park mortuary, and his ashes were scattered at sea, three miles off Marina del Rey, California, with the ashes of his friend Rusty Hamer in a combined ceremony.

== Filmography ==
=== Film ===
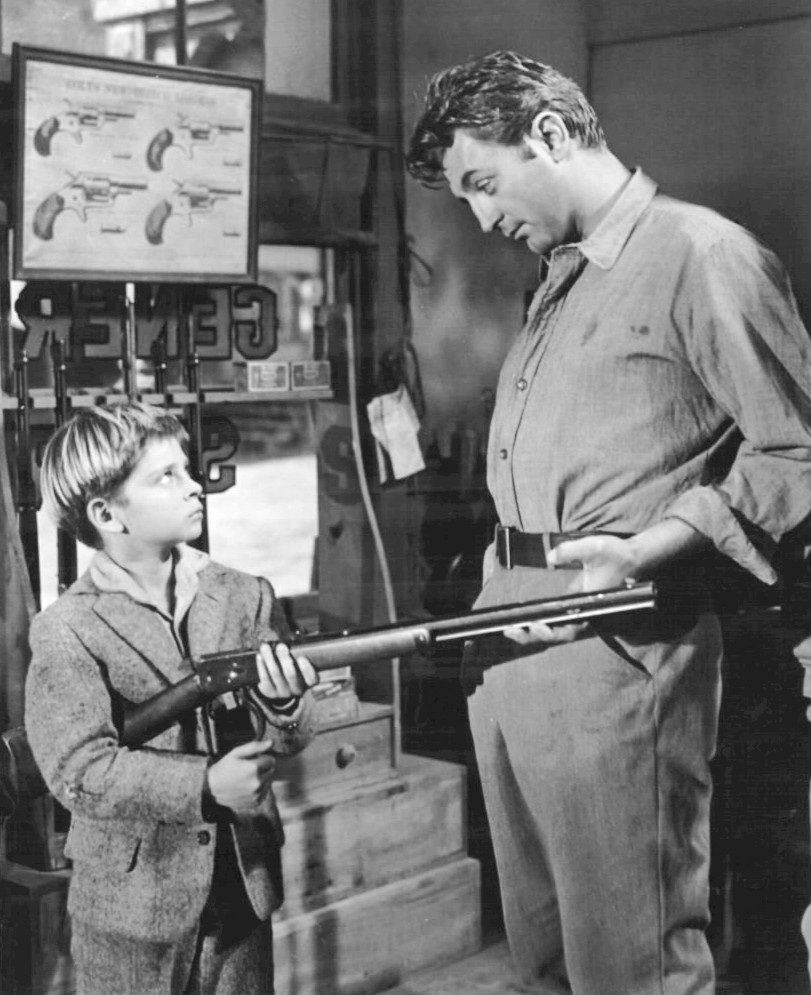
Rettig with Robert Mitchum in River of No Return (1954)

Year	Title	Role	Notes
1950	Panic in the Streets	Tommy Reed	Uncredited
1950	The Jackpot	Tommy Lawrence	
1950	Two Weeks With Love	Ricky Robinson	
1950	For Heaven's Sake	Joe Blake	
1951	The Strip	Artie Ardrey	
1951	Elopement	Daniel Reagan	
1951	Weekend With Father	David Bowen	
1952	Gobs and Gals	Bertram	
1952	Paula	David Larsen	
1953	The Lady Wants Mink	Ritchie Connors	
1953	The 5,000 Fingers of Dr. T.	Bartholomew Collins	
1953	So Big	Dirk (aged 8)	
1954	River of No Return	Mark Calder	
1954	The Raid	Larry Bishop	
1954	The Egyptian	Thoth (son of Meryt)	
1955	The Cobweb	Mark McIver	
1955	At Gunpoint	Billy Wright	
1956	The Last Wagon	Billy	

=== Television ===
Year	Title	Role	Notes
1949, 1951	Kraft Television Theatre		2 episodes
1949, 1958	Studio One	Michael Banks / Jim Metcalf / Johnny Weber	3 episodes
1950	Escape		Episode: "The Myth Makers"
1952–1954	The Ford Television Theatre	Fitzjames Lindsey / Robin Glenn / Larry Hartley	3 episodes
1952	Chevron Theatre		4 episodes
1953	Four Star Playhouse	Tommy	Episode: "No Identity"
1953	Your Play Time		Episode: "Long, Long Ago"
1954–1957	Lassie	Jeff Miller	Main cast, seasons 1–4 (116 episodes)
1954	Omnibus	Robert	Episode: "Nothing So Monstrous"
1954	Lux Video Theatre	Jody	Episode: "Shall Not Perish"
1954	The Pepsi-Cola Playhouse	Johnny	Episode: "Long, Long Ago"
1955	Schlitz Playhouse of Stars	John Kelly	Episode: "Mr. Ears"
1958	Whirlybirds	Bobby	Episode: "Unwanted"
1960	The Man from Blackhawk	Pierre	Episode: "The Ghost of Laffite"
1960	Lawman	Dean Bailey	Episode: "The Town Boys"
1961	Wagon Train	Billy Gentry	Episode: "Weight of Command"
1961	Peter Gunn	Kevin Daniels	Episode: "I Know It's Murder"
1962	Death Valley Days	Joel Robison	Episode: "Davy's Friend"
1964	The Littlest Hobo	Nathan	Episode: "Curse of Smoky Ridge"
1965–1966	Never Too Young	JoJo	14 episodes
1965	Many Happy Returns	Eddie	Episode: "The Diamond"
1965	Mr. Novak	Frank	Episode: "The Firebrand"
1965	The Fugitive	J.J. Eckhardt	Episode: "Trial by Fire"
1966, 1969	This Is the Life	Dave Collins / Chuck	2 episodes
1992	The New Lassie	Professor Jeff Miller	Episode: "The Computer Study"; also writer

== Bibliography ==
- Castro, Luis; Hanson, Jay; Rettig, Tom (1985). Advanced programmer's guide: featuring dBase II and dBase II. Ashton-Tate. ISBN 9780912677057.
- Rettig, Tom; Moody, Debby (1988). Expert Advisor: dBase III Plus. Addison Wesley. ISBN 9780201171976.
- Rettig, Tom; Moody, Debby (1989). Tom Rettig's Clipper Encyclopedia. Addison Wesley. ISBN 9780553347982.
- Rettig, Tom; Sander, Ellen; Moody, Debby (1990). Tom Rettig's FoxPro Handbook. Bantum Books. ISBN 9780553349375.
