= Never Too Young =

American TV daytime serial (1965–1966)

- Genre: Soap opera Teen Drama
- Written by: David Robert Kanter; Ron Sproat; Hendrik Vollaerts
- Directed by: Bruce Minnix
- Narrated by: Roger Christian
- Composer: Ray Martin
- Country of origin: United States
- Original language: English
- No. of episodes: 192

Production
- Executive producer: Larry Cohen
- Producers: Larry Miller; Bruce Minnix
- Running time: 22–25 minutes
- Production companies: Conson Studios, Inc.

Original release
- Network: ABC
- Release: September 27, 1965 – June 24, 1966

Never Too Young is an American daytime serial that aired on ABC from September 27, 1965 to June 24, 1966 and was the first soap opera geared towards a teen audience. The show premiered on ABC on the same day as The Nurses.

== Synopsis ==
The series, which featured Tony Dow of Leave It to Beaver and Tommy Rettig of Lassie fame, was set in Malibu, California. Never Too Young chronicled the lives of a group of teens and their parents. Stories were told from the point of view of Alfy (David Watson), the owner of the local beach hangout, "The High Dive".

The series featured several musical guests who performed at The High Dive, including: The Castaways, The Sunrays, Marvin Gaye, Johnny Rivers, Paul Revere & the Raiders, Mel Carter, Freddie Cannon, Ramsey Lewis Trio and The Girls.

The show's theme song was composed by Ray Martin and Edyth Britton.

The series was replaced by the ABC gothic soap opera Dark Shadows.

== Cast ==
- Merry Anders.....Aunt Alice
- Michael Blodgett.....Tad
- Jan Clayton......Mrs. Porter
- Pat Connolly.....Barbara
- Tony Dow.....Chet
- Joy Harmon.....Chet's girlfriend
- Robin Grace......Joy
- John Lupton.....Frank
- Dack Rambo.....Tim
- Tommy Rettig......JoJo
- Carol Sydes.....Susan
- David Watson.....Alfy
- Patrice Wymore.....Rhoda
