= David Kogan (radio writer) =

American writer (1916–2009)

- Born: David Phillip Rothman; December 22, 1916; Philadelphia, Pennsylvania, U.S.
- Died: August 6, 2009 (aged 92); Maine, U.S.
- Education: Columbia University
- Occupation: Writer
- Spouse: Sylvia Scaroff
- Children: 1
- Writing career
- Years active: 1942–1953
- Genres: Crime fiction, horror, science fiction

David Philip Kogan (né Rothman; December 22, 1916 – August 6, 2009) was an American radio and television writer, director and producer, best known for the Edgar-winning radio series, The Mysterious Traveler, scripted in collaboration with Robert Arthur Jr.

== Early life and career ==
Born in Philadelphia, Pennsylvania on December 22, 1916, Kogan was the son of Yetta (née Cipes) and Samuel Rothman. After his father died in 1920, he and his mother moved to Brooklyn, where he attended Junior High School P.S. 109, and Samuel J. Tilden High School, graduating in 1932. However, what clearly seems in hindsight the pivotal moment in all those years of schooling occurred, circa 1940, while studying radio production with Erik Barnouw at Columbia University, when one of Kogan's classmates proved to be none other than his future partner in crime, novelist Bob Arthur.

Speaking roughly 60 years later with radio historian Anthony Tollin, Kogan detailed how he and his late partner would customarily divide the workload.

We developed the plots together and then one or the other of us would go off and write it. [...] I've always loved science fiction so I tended to write the scripts in that genre. Bob Arthur was a former Weird Tales pulp writer so he generally handled the horror scripts. [Bob] didn't really care for directing, so he usually left that for me.

Kogan and Arthur were honored three times by the Mystery Writers of America with Edgar Awards for their radio work: twice for "best radio drama"—in 1950 for Murder by Experts and 1953 for The Mysterious Traveler—and once in 1951, regarding their work on both shows, for "outstanding achievement in producing, directing and writing radio mystery shows."

However, in September 1952, the respective radio careers of Arthur and Kogan came to an unceremonious end, as manifested in the sudden cancellation of their long-running signature series. This was due–as for so many in Hollywood at that moment–to alleged "pro-Communist affiliations [and or] ideology", specifically those attributed to the Radio Writers Guild, to which both Kogan and Arthur belonged, the former, in particular, being an especially active and visible member. In fact, the beginning of that month had seen an article published by Broadcasting Telecasting, entitled "'Red' Probe; More Details Expected", specifically naming Kogan, alongside ten other RWG council members (among them Ernest Kinoy and Howard Rodman Sr.).

Unlike Arthur, for whom radio scripting was merely an extended digression within an already well established career as a writer of short fiction, Kogan had no comparable fallback option, at least none even vaguely arts-related. He eventually resurfaced as a Philadelphia-based portfolio manager, whose writing could occasionally be found in financial publications. In addition, one notable side venture, harking back to Kogan's pre-war employment as a salesperson in the Bond Linen Store chain, shows up in 1971, in what appears to have been a fairly short-lived, linen-dispensing retail outlet, David's of Cedarbrook, operated by Kogan's wife, Sylvia.

== Personal life and death ==
In Philadelphia, in October 1944, Kogan married Sylvia Scaroff. They had at least one child, a son, Kenneth.

On August 6, 2009, Kogan, who had most recently resided in Montgomery, Pennsylvania, died in Maine at the age of 93. He was survived by his wife and son.

== Works ==
=== Radio ===
- Bulldog Drummond
  - Unknown episode (c. late 1930s)
- The Shadow
  - Unknown episode (c. late 1930s)
- The Adventures of the Thin Man
  - Unknown episode (c. late 1930s)
- Dark Destiny
  - "It's Later Than You Think" and all subsequent episodes (1942–1943)
- That They Might Live
  - "Dawn at Cassino" (1943)
- The Mysterious Traveler
  - All Episodes (1943–1952) – Created and written by with Bob Arthur
- The Shadow
  - "Death to the Shadow" (1944)
- The Return of Nick Carter
  - All summer 1944 episodes (1944) – Written with Bob Arthur; unspecified prior episodes by Kogan alone
- Unspecified
  - "The Seeing Eye" (1944)
- Men at Sea
  - "Able-Bodied Cook" (1944)
- The Sealed Book
  - All episodes (1945) – Created and wrote with Arthur
- Unspecified
  - "The Road Ahead" (1945)
- A Voice in the Night
  - Main writer (1946) with Bob Arthur
- The House of Mystery
  - Unspecified episode(s) (1949) writer and director
- Murder by Experts
  - All episodes (1949–1951) – Co-creator/writer (with Arthur), director

=== Television ===
- The Clock
  - Season 1 Episode 40 "Bury Her Deep" (1950) – Writer (with Arthur, adapted from like-named episode of their 1942 radio series Dark Destiny)
  - Season 1 Episode 53 "A Grave Plot" (1950) – Story (with Arthur, adapted by John Gerstad)
- Suspense
  - Season 2 Episode 33 "Murder at the Mardi Gras" (1950) - From a Story By (with Robert A. Arthur; adapted by Charles Robinson)
- Dark Destiny
  - Season 1 Episode 1 "Bury Her Deep" (1952) – Director and co-creator/writer (with Arthur, adapted from episode of their like-named 1942 radio series)
  - Season 1 Episode 2 "Murder by Proxy" (1952) – Same as above
  - Season 1 Episode 3 "Dig Your Own Grave" (1952) – Same as above
  - Season 1 Episode 4 "The Music Box" (1952) – Same as above
