= The Sealed Book =

Old time radio series

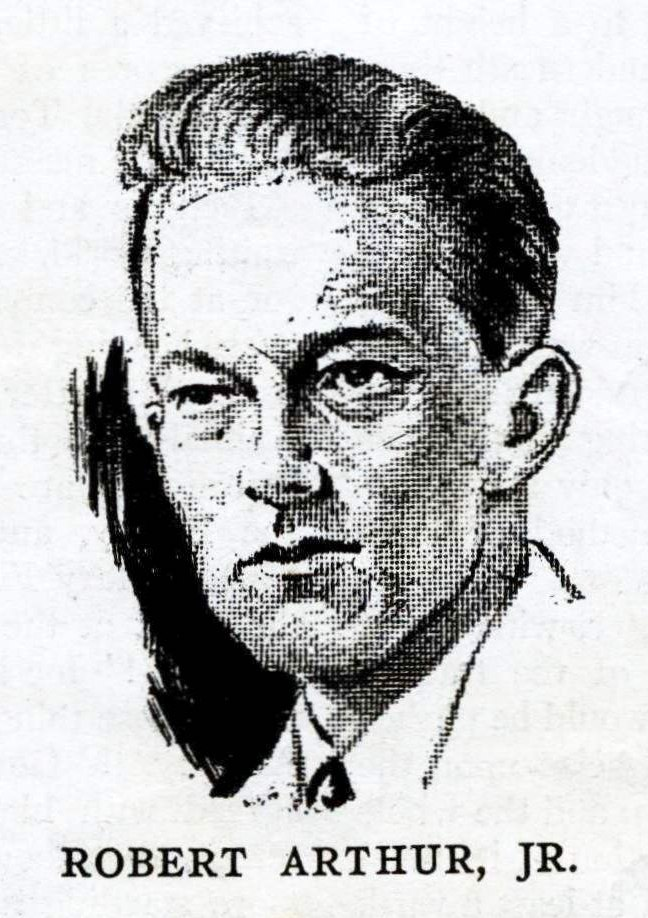
Scriptwriter Robert Arthur, Jr c. 1931

The Sealed Book was a radio series of mystery and terror tales, produced and directed by Jock MacGregor for the Mutual network. Between March 18 and September 9, 1945, the melodramatic anthology series was broadcast on Sundays from 10:30 pm to 11:00 pm.

Each week, after "the sound of the great gong," host Philip Clarke observed that the mysteriously silent "keeper of the book has opened the ponderous door to the secret vault wherein is kept the great sealed book, in which is recorded all the secrets and mysteries of mankind through the ages, Here are tales of every kind, tales of murder, of madness, of dark deeds strange and terrible beyond all belief." After this introduction, the dramas began, with three organ solo breaks for inserting the commercials of local stations carrying the program. Although this anthology series did not have recurring characters (other than the Narrator and the Keeper of the Book), the writers often used the same names for different characters from week to week, including "Hester", "Drake", "Chris", and most especially "Roger".

At the end of an episode, Clarke told listeners to tune in the following week when "the sound of the great gong heralds another strange and exciting tale from... the sealed book." Scripts were by Robert Arthur, Jr. and David Kogan, who also were responsible for The Mysterious Traveler, and recycled many of the more popular stories from that parent program. "The Hands of Death" was the first of the 26 episodes which concluded with "You Only Die Once".
