= Quiet, Please =

Radio fantasy and horror program

Tom Kiesche (left) and Michael Lanahan in Corey Klemow's 2004 Quiet, Please! stage production at Hollywood's Sacred Fools Theater Company

Quiet, Please! was a radio fantasy and horror program created by Wyllis Cooper, also known for creating Lights Out. Ernest Chappell was the show's announcer and lead actor. Quiet, Please debuted June 8, 1947, on the Mutual Broadcasting System, and its last episode was broadcast June 25, 1949, on the ABC. A total of 106 shows were broadcast, with only a very few of them repeats.

Earning relatively little notice during its initial run, Quiet, Please has since been praised as one of the finest efforts of the golden age of American radio drama. Professor Richard J. Hand of the University of Glamorgan, in a detailed critical analysis of the series, argued that Cooper and Chappell "created works of astonishing originality"; he further describes the program as an "extraordinary body of work" which established Cooper "as one of the greatest auteurs of horror radio". Similarly, radio historian Ron Lackmann declares that the episodes "were exceptionally well written and outstandingly acted", while John Dunning describes the show as "a potent series bristling with rich imagination."

== Broadcast history ==
=== Background ===
Quiet, Please had its roots in The Campbell Playhouse (1938–1940), the successor to Orson Welles's The Mercury Theatre on the Air, which achieved notoriety with its 1938 adaptation of H. G. Wells's novel The War of the Worlds. Cooper was a writer for The Campbell Playhouse, and Chappell was the announcer. They became friends, and though Chappell had little (if any) acting experience, Cooper imagined him as the star of a new radio program. Cooper's earlier Lights Out was famous for its gruesome stories and sound effects, but for Quiet, Please, Cooper would cultivate a subdued, slower-paced, and much quieter atmosphere that could still, at its best, match Lights Out for frights and thrills. Chappell had ample experience in radio, but mostly as an announcer. As Hand writes, "With Quiet, Please, Cooper gave Ernest Chappell the chance to act, and the result was a revelation. Chappell proved himself to be versatile in accent and delivery." The differences could be broad or subtle, but in nearly every episode, Chappell created a distinctive character, rarely using the same traits in multiple episodes. Writer Harlan Ellison, a longtime Quiet, Please fan, writes that the programs were "backed by sound effects and music...but it was essentially Chappell, just speaking softly. Quietly. Terrifyingly." Ellison also describes Chappell as having "one of the great radio voices. A sound that combined urbanity with storytelling wisdom."

=== On the air ===
Quiet, Please was produced at WOR in New York City, and began on the Mutual Network on June 8, 1947. Beginning in September 1948, it was syndicated by ABC, though CBS executive Davidson Taylor expressed an interest in the show, writing in a memo in March 1948, "I like this show a lot and believe we could get it if we wanted."

Each episode began with Chappell intoning the show's title, followed by a long pause (sometimes up to seven seconds), before repeating the title. Then, the show's theme music was played, a dirgey, funereal organ and Novachord version of a portion of the second movement of César Franck's Symphony in D Minor. The introduction established the sparse, understated tone of the show, and has inspired collectors and reviewers to remark upon Cooper's use of the dramatic power of silence.

Quiet, Please (intro)
Intro to January 30, 1949 episode

Though the general thrust of the stories were fantasy, horror and suspense, Cooper's Quiet, Please scripts covered a broad thematic range, including romance, science fiction, crime, family drama and humor (some of it quite self-deprecating). Dunning describes the show as "outstanding dark fantasy"; Hand notes that this description is broadly accurate, but that there are a few humorous or sentimental Quiet, Please episodes which "aren't particularly 'dark'". Hand also suggests that "any attempt to categorize the series feels like diminishing its scope of achievement." Regardless of content, most episodes had a dreamlike, surreal quality, where odd or paranormal events were not always explained: Dunning wrote that the show's "characters walked in a fuzzy dream world where the element of menace was ripe and ever present."

Hand writes that "Cooper was a master of the opening line. Almost every episode of Quiet, Please begins with a sentence or two that hooks the listener, commanding their attention and their curiosity."

Most episodes featured no more than two or three actors, with Chappell taking the first person voice in all but a handful of episodes (with the closing describing him as "the man who spoke to you"), usually telling the tale via flashbacks. Dunning writes that "Cooper's pet hate was of 'acting' and he wanted [each story] related with a deadpan sense of 'here's how it happened.'" Chappell usually took a conversational tone, relating the stories slowly and casually; he frequently played a specialist worker, giving Cooper a chance to add background details from his own earlier jobs as a soldier, gandy dancer or oil platform worker. Though supporting players were sparse, a group of New York radio veterans were heard on a frequent basis: as female characters, in male bit parts, or as the supernatural or otherworldly beings the ordinary Chappell character encounters. Most notably, radio star Claudia Morgan (longtime voice of Nora Charles on The Adventures of the Thin Man, and Ernest Chappell's wife) was an occasional female lead, usually in tragic romances, and was heard in the final show (titled "Quiet, Please", a meditation on war and peace). In one lost show, "Three Sides to a Story", Morgan's father Ralph Morgan was also a guest. J. Pat O'Malley, later a familiar TV character actor, was another frequent voice, heard in more than a dozen shows throughout the run, beginning with the first broadcast "Nothing Behind the Door". He played foreman Ted in "The Thing on the Fourbleboard" and was often used in parts requiring Irish or Scottish accents. Radio commentator and disc jockey Jack Lescoulie guest starred in the radio-themed "Twelve to Five".

At the end of each program, Cooper offered a teaser for the next show. These were usually unrehearsed, and often displayed Cooper's wry or morbid humor: "My story for you next week is called 'A Night to Forget'. It's about a man who wished he could – and couldn't." Cooper's teaser was always followed by Chappell's sign-off: "And so, until next week at this same time, I am quietly yours, Ernest Chappell."

Compared to other contemporary radio dramas, Quiet, Please used fewer sound effects and less dialogue, relying instead on first person narration to drive each play. As noted above, silence was often used masterfully; a 1949 Oakland Tribune article by John Crosby notes, "There are long, long pauses, so long sometimes you wonder if your radio has gone on the blink. Networks are horrified at the amount of dead air they purchase along with Cooper. (A half hour Cooper script played at ordinary tempo would run about 11 minutes.)" Though Crosby praised Quiet, Please, he thought the dramas sometimes employed confused, deus ex machina endings and characters were occasionally underdeveloped. He also wrote that Cooper "avoids clichés with such intensity that he's creating his own."

Most episodes had a strongly moralist tone: evildoers were nearly always punished, and good was typically rewarded. In 1949, Harriett Cannon wrote, "Although in no sense a 'religious' show, [Quiet, Please] has some of its strongest supporters among the clergy." In fact, Cooper often drew upon the Bible for inspiration, though he generally tweaked the stories and plots past the point of easy recognizability. Even the easily recognizable Bible stories are given a twist: "The Third Man's Story" (6 September 1948) retells the story of Cain and Abel, suggesting that Cain's act was motivated by Abel's arrogance and taunts. Cooper's scripts were, arguably, among the best of their era; Hand argues that "Cooper employs excellent structuring devices in creating 30-minute radio drama", even comparing one episode ("Three Sides to a Story") to Sartre's No Exit. Love triangles were another frequent plot device for Quiet, Please.

As with many radio programs to feature prominent organ accompaniment, Quiet, Please was a rather low-budget undertaking. The show's keyboardist (Albert Berman for most of the episodes), however, arguably utilized the instruments in a more innovative way than others—not only for punctuation of climactic moments, but also as an element of the scripts, as in the lazy, boogie woogie riffs in the clandestine casino scenes in "Good Ghost" (24 November 1948). The show's theme was used as a plot device in at least three episodes: as a post-hypnotic trigger in by a hypnotist in "Symphony in D Minor" (13 September 1948), "The Evening and the Morning" and in "Come In, Eddie".

Unusually for episodic radio drama, several episodes were sequels of earlier broadcasts, or at least recycled the same ideas: A character and setting from the very first episode "Nothing Behind the Door" (8 June 1947) are referenced in one of the last episodes, "The Other Side of the Stars"; in "The Man Who Knew Everything" (6 March 1949) the titular character seems to die at the episode's end, only to return in "The Venetian Blind Man" (3 April 1949). Another pair of episodes, though not directly sequels, both feature an enchanted watch that allows its bearer to time travel: ("It's Later Than You Think" (8 February 1948) and "Not Responsible After Thirty Years" (14 June 1948)

Despite some positive reviews (and a loyal audience that might be classified as a cult following, based on Crosby's claim the network received more requests from fans for Quiet, Please scripts than for any other radio program) the show never established itself and never attracted a sponsor. Quiet, Please might have suffered from poor scheduling, which was often dependent upon a regular sponsor. During its first year, Quiet, Please was broadcast at 3.30 pm, a time slot usually reserved for after-school programming aimed at juveniles. Its second season found the show at a more appropriate 9.30 pm, but its third and final season the show was bumped again, this time to 5.30pm (noted times are Eastern Standard Time)

==== "The Thing on the Fourble Board" ====
Probably the most highly regarded episode of Quiet, Please is "The Thing on the Fourble Board" (August 9, 1948), about an oil-field worker who encounters a mysterious subterranean being hiding on the derrick's catwalk. The unusual title is a bit of oil worker argot: the "fourble board" of an oil derrick is a narrow catwalk that is as high up as four lengths of drilling pipe placed vertically (two lengths of pipe are a "double", three are a "thribble" and four are a "fourble".)

The story's effectiveness has led some fans to label the episode one of the best radio horror programs ever broadcast. Richard J. Hand of the University of Glamorgan notes that "The Thing on the Fourble Board" is not only cited as the finest example of radio horror, but occasionally cited as one of the best examples of radio drama as a whole. Especially effective was Cecil Roy's vocal performance as the creature. Though she performs only very briefly, Roy's vocal (barely recognizable as human) was cited by Dunning as still startling and chill-inducing even after decades.

According to Hand, Cooper's script for the episode was dizzyingly multilayered, blending authentic details of oil rig workers' daily activities, with elements of what might be termed "subterranea" or Hollow Earth lore, yet managing to faintly invoke nautical stories like the kraken.

=== In other media ===
Cooper and Chappell remained friends after Quiet, Please went off the air, and even founded a production company, mainly to support their unsuccessful efforts to interest adapting Quiet, Please to television.

In 2004, at the Sacred Fools Theater Company in Los Angeles, Corey Klemow directed stage adaptations of two of the best-regarded Cooper scripts, The Thing on the Fourble Board and Whence Came You?

A film version of the episode "The Evening & The Morning" appears on YouTube.

Since 2020, the Quietly Yours podcast has featured discussions of each episode of the series (in order of original broadcast).

== Meta-fiction ==
Wyllis Cooper

Though many radio programs used various meta-fictional ploys, Quiet, Please arguably offered some of the most effective and intriguing examples. Hand writes that Cooper "enjoys creating roles for the audience: passive listener, surreptitious eavesdropper, or even someone implicated in the action of the story itself." Scripts often broke down the fourth wall by speaking directly to the listener. On "The Other Side of the Stars", (broadcast May 8, 1949), Chappell appeared as Esau (the name is another of Cooper's many Biblical touches), a character who narrates the story as though he were broadcasting it on live radio; a show within a show. Esau relates the tale of his girlfriend's odd fate after she discovered a conquistador's armor while exploring a well in Arizona, but he is repeatedly interrupted by her brother, who arrived uninvited for the broadcast. Chappell's character in "Inquest" is forced to stand in front of a vast, visible radio audience, while being assured that he will be supplied with sound effects as they are necessary to accompany the story he tells.

Several episodes blurred the distinction between performer and fictional character: In a few episodes (such as "Is This Murder"), Ernest Chappell portrayed a man named "Ernest". In "Where Do You Get Your Ideas?" Cooper played himself, while Chappell portrayed a drunken barfly, pestering the writer. In the episode "12 to 5" (broadcast April 12, 1948), Chappell plays a disk jockey who delivers an on-air commercial for "Chappell's Apples" (as well as a portion of the César Franck theme).

== Extant episodes ==
For many years, the majority of the show's episodes were feared lost, with only 12 episodes in general circulation among collectors. In the late 1980s, more than 80 episodes were discovered, comprising the majority of the series' run. Many of the recordings are of rather poor sound quality, but are nonetheless treasured by collectors. 88 episodes, plus half of an 89th, are currently in circulation. All the episodes are believed to be in the public domain, and can be downloaded free of charge. Another 17 are presumed lost, though, according to Hand, scripts survive for all of them.

The fact that any episodes of Quiet, Please survive in general circulation might well be due to Chappell's efforts. He wrote to Cooper's widow Emily in 1966 to report that he owned copies of all but 11 episodes on transcription discs and had copied them all to reel to reel tape. Stating that he would happily copy any episodes for Emily, Chappell further wrote that "It took a lot of hours to make the tape transfers but I got a big thrill out of hearing them all over again and I want to say that there were many occasions when my emotions blew up and I just plain bawled. They brought back such wonderful times and so many intimate memories of such a treasured friend."

== Influence ==
Writer Harlan Ellison has praised Quiet, Please and rates it as one of the finest and most effective programs in the history of radio or television. He discovered the show in his youth and states that even though the bulk of the episodes were lost for decades, several Quiet, Please episodes haunted his memory and exerted a strong influence on his writing.

In a 1981 column, Ellison wrote that he stumbled across one particular episode in his childhood, and afterwards, became a devoted Quiet, Please listener. He remembers the title of that episode as "Five Miles Down". Ellison writes, "I heard something I have never forgotten... What I heard that Sunday afternoon, so long ago, that has never left my thoughts for even one week, through all those years, was this:

"There is a place just five miles from where you now stand that no human eye has even seen. It is...five miles down!"

Ellison goes on to relate the plot (at least as he remembers it after several decades, admitting that time might have altered some of the details), and asks, "[H]ow many stories you heard or saw or read fifteen years ago, ten years ago, even five years ago...do you remember that clearly today? And I heard 'Five Miles Down' at least forty years ago. And it's still with me."

Ellison's recollection is a little inaccurate: he relates the story being broadcast "early in the Forties" on Quiet, Please when it was in fact a late-1940s episode of another series, The Mysterious Traveler. In 2004, Ellison took part in a recreation of the "Five Miles Down" script (by Robert Arthur and David Kogan, not Wyllis Cooper) at a convention of the Society to Preserve and Encourage Radio Drama, Variety and Comedy. He "acted and helped direct the show" and recalled hearing the episode when he was growing up.

== Episode influences ==
In the October 17, 1948 episode titled "And Jeannie Dreams of Me" the Stephen Foster song "Jeanie with the Light Brown Hair" figured prominently. The episode uses the song throughout and its title is a reversal of the song title which acts as a foreshadowing to the theme of the episode.
