= Trapped (1950 TV series) =

American television series

Trapped is a 30-minute American dramatic television mystery series that was broadcast on WOR-TV in New York City. Harvey Marlowe directed and packaged the program, which debuted on September 8, 1950.
