= Ernest Chappell =

American radio announcer and actor (1903–1983)

- Born: Ernest E. Chappell; June 10, 1903; Syracuse, New York, U.S.
- Died: July 4, 1983, age 80; North Palm Beach, Florida, U.S.
- Education: Syracuse University
- Occupations: Announcer, actor

Ernest E. Chappell (June 10, 1903 - July 4, 1983) was an American radio announcer and actor, best remembered for his featured role in the late 1940s radio program Quiet, Please. The show ran from 1947 to 1949, and Quiet, Please was Chappell's major acting credit. His signature line was: "And so, until next week at this same time, I am quietly yours, Ernest Chappell."

== Early years ==
Chappell graduated from Syracuse University in 1925, planning to be a singer.

== Early professional work ==
Before he began his career on radio, Chappell was "a concert baritone, a song-and-dance man in musical comedy, a lecturer and a stock company actor."

== Radio ==
On February 10, 1925, Chappell was the announcer, as well as the director of the first radio station in Syracuse, New York, WFBL (which stood for First Broadcast License). He worked in Syracuse 1925-1927 and went to Rochester, New York, in 1928 to work at WHAM. On Monday, November 9, 1925, Chappell began writing for the Syracuse Herald. His column, "Riding the Waves With Chap", included promotion for the broadcasting industry and the local station.

In the 1930s, Chappell was master of ceremonies for Phil Spitalny's radio program. For several years on each program, Chappell also served as the announcer for The Campbell Playhouse (the sponsored continuation of The Mercury Theatre on the Air) and for The Adventures of Ellery Queen.

== Television ==
Chappell was also "the voice of Pall Mall" in American Tobacco's television cigarette commercials from the mid-1950s into the mid-'60s. His famous tag line: "Buy Pall Mall famous cigarettes...'OUTSTANDING! and they are mild!'".

== Recording ==
In 1941, Chappell narrated A Christmas Carol on an RCA Victor album containing four 12-inch records.
