= The Creaking Door =

South African radio program

The Creaking Door was an old-time radio series of horror and suspense shows originating in South Africa.

The Old Time Radio Researchers Group reports 42 extant episodes in MP3 circulation. The series was first aired in 1964-65. The stories are thrillers in the Inner Sanctum vein, and generally thought of favorably by most fans of OTR.

It was sponsored by State Express 555 (pronounced "State Express Three Fives") cigarettes, a British American Tobacco product.

One episode, "Face to Face"—about a planned first landing on the Moon—refers to "Cape Kennedy" as the launch site, placing the broadcast between 1964 (when Cape Canaveral was renamed Cape Kennedy) and 1969 (the actual first Moon landing).
