= Your Play Time =

American television series

Your Play Time is a 30-minute American television anthology series that ran as a summer replacement show in 1953, 1954, and 1955.

The first two seasons contained live and filmed dramas, often with foreign settings. The 1955 season had comedic and dramatic episodes, all on film and all set in America. In seasons one and two (1953–54) it was the summer replacement for Ann Sothern's Private Secretary and The Jack Benny Program. In 1954, episodes were "re-runs of films from various series". In the third season it replaced Your Hit Parade.

Guest stars that included Hillary Brooke, Peter Graves, Jack Haley, George Nader, Tommy Rettig, and Ruth Warrick.

Episodes were broadcast from June 14, 1953, to September 6, 1953; June 13, 1954, to September 5, 1954; and June 18, 1955, to September 3, 1955. In 1954, the sponsor was American Tobacco Company.
