= Escape (1950 TV series) =

American dramatic anthology television series

Escape is a 30-minute live American dramatic anthology television series produced and directed for CBS by Wyllis Cooper. Narrated by William Conrad, the series was the television counterpart to a successful CBS Radio series of the same name (1947–1954). Thirteen episodes aired on CBS from January 5, 1950, to March 30, 1950. The show's stories "depicted people attempting to deal with danger, the supernatural, or some fantasized situation."

Among its guest stars were Kim Stanley, Lee Marvin, Tommy Rettig, and Brian Keith.

The announcers were Jack McCoy and Elliott Lewis. The program was sustaining and originated from WCBS-TV.
