= Maurice Tarplin =

Novelist and radio actor (1911–1975)

- Born: April 1, 1911; Boston, Massachusetts
- Died: May 12, 1975, age 64
- Occupations: Actor, novelist
- Known for: Acting on radio
- Spouse(s): Catharine Selby Flygare Tarplin (1933–?); Grace Tarplin
- Children: 2

Maurice Tarplin (April 1, 1911, Boston, Massachusetts – May 12, 1975) was an American novelist and a radio actor best known as the narrator of The Mysterious Traveler, employing a voice once described as "eerily sardonic."

== Radio ==
Tarplin was a familiar voice as Dr. Weird on The Strange Dr. Weird and Inspector Faraday on Boston Blackie. He was heard on numerous other shows, including Valiant Lady, The Shadow, Theater Five, The March of Time (as Winston Churchill), Gangbusters and various soap operas. He played Los Angeles District Attorney Richard Hanley on The Guiding Light. On Myrt and Marge he played Barnie Belzer, and he was in several episodes of Tom Corbett, Space Cadet. He once voiced Agatha Christie's detective Hercule Poirot in the series Murder Clinic.

== Writing ==
Tarplin's novel, Seven Casks of Death, was published in the June 1948 issue of Dime Mystery Magazine.

== Television and film ==
In later years, Tarplin did voiceovers for TV commercials and worked on the English language soundtracks for foreign films.

== Personal life ==
Tarplin was married to Grace Tarplin and had two boys.

His first marriage was to Catharine Selby Flygare in 1933. This marriage produced no children and ended during World War II. She died in 2010 at the age of 100.

== Listen to ==
- The Strange Dr. Weird (28 1944–45 episodes)
