= H.M. Tennent Globe Theatre =

UK television series

H.M. Tennent Globe Theatre is a 90-minute UK drama anthology television series which was made by Associated Television (ATV) for the ITV network. Eight episodes were produced and broadcast on ITV in 1956. The episode titles were Misalliance, Skylark, The Living Room (by Graham Greene), Seagulls over Sorrento, Dear Charles, The Golden Entry, and an adaptation of Daphne Du Maurier's novel, Rebecca.
