= The Strange Dr. Weird =

1940s radio program

Maurice Tarplin

The Strange Dr. Weird is a radio program broadcast on Mutual from 1944 to 1945.

Sponsored by Adam Hats, the drama is notable in part because it was a sister series to The Mysterious Traveler, both in theme and its narrator. Maurice Tarplin, who was also the creepy voice of The Mysterious Traveler. Many of the scripts were condensed 15-minute versions of scripts originally broadcast on The Mysterious Traveler.

To the accompaniment of an organ's spooky strains, Tarplin introduced each episode:

Good evening. Come in, won't you? Why, what's the matter? You seem a bit nervous. Perhaps the cemetery outside this house has upset you. But there are things far worse than cemeteries. For instance...

The closing line never changed:

Perhaps you’ll drop in on me again soon. I’m always home. Just look for the house on the other side of the cemetery... the house of Dr Weird!

The 29 episodes were produced and directed by Jock McGregor and written by Robert A. Arthur, who also scripted for The Mysterious Traveler.

== Listen to ==
- The Strange Dr. Weird (29 1944–45 episodes)
