= The Mysterious Traveler =

Anthology radio series, magazine, and comic book

Front cover of the November 1951 issue

The Mysterious Traveler was an American media franchise created by Robert Arthur and David Kogan. All versions of the franchise focused on suspense and crime fiction, with occasional elements of horror or science fiction.

The anthology radio series debuted in 1943 and ran until 1952, featuring a narrator-host known as "the Mysterious Traveler". The concept was later adapted to magazine in 1952-53, and the comic book format in 1948, 1956–59, and in 1985.

== Radio ==
Written and directed by Robert Arthur and David Kogan, the radio series was sponsored by Adam Hats. It began on the Mutual Broadcasting System, December 5, 1943, continuing in many different time slots until September 16, 1952. The lonely sound of a distant locomotive heralded the arrival of the sinister narrator (portrayed by Maurice Tarplin), who introduced himself each week in the following manner:

This is the Mysterious Traveler, inviting you to join me on another journey into the strange and terrifying. I hope you will enjoy the trip, that it will thrill you a little and chill you a little. So settle back, get a good grip on your nerves and be comfortable—if you can!

The narrator also took an active role in some episodes. In "The Accusing Corpse", he appears as a coroner named Roger. In "The Good Die Young" he appears as a general practitioner named Doctor Smith.

Cast members included Jackson Beck, Lon Clark, Roger DeKoven, Elspeth Eric, Wendell Holmes, Bill Johnstone, Joseph Julian, Jan Miner, Santos Ortega, Bryna Raeburn, Frank Readick, Luis van Rooten, Ann Shepherd, Lawson Zerbe and Bill Zuckert. Sound effects were by Jack Amrhein, Jim Goode, Ron Harper, Walt McDonough and Al Schaffer.

"Behind the Locked Door", a popular, much-requested episode which took place in total darkness, was repeated several times during the years. Two archaeologists discover a century-old wagon train that had been sealed in a cave following a landslide. When their Native American guide is mysteriously and brutally attacked, the two, now lost in the darkness, conclude that the descendants of the wagon train are still living in the cave.

Only 75 of the original 370 Mysterious Traveler episodes still exist. The popularity of the series spawned other supernatural shows, such as The Sealed Book. With scripts by a Mysterious Traveler writer and Tarplin as host-narrator, The Strange Dr. Weird was a nearly identical program.

== Magazine ==
Luis van Rooten on The Mysterious Traveler

Grace Publishing's 1951–52 Mysterious Traveler digest-sized magazine ran for five issues with cover paintings by famed pulp illustrator Norman Saunders. The publisher was David Kogan, and managing editor Robert Arthur also contributed many stories. The first issue (November 1951) carried a welcome from the Mysterious Traveler himself:

This is the Mysterious Traveler, inviting you to join me on another journey into the realm of mystery and suspense. This time the trip is to be made in the pages of a magazine, rather than on the air. Thousands of letters have come to me from the many listeners who enjoy my weekly radio program on the Mutual Broadcasting System, urging me to put some of my stories into printed form.

This magazine is the answer. Some of the stories in it will be my own, retold for your enjoyment in fiction form by the finest writers of today. But many of the other stories will be favorites of mine, both new and old, written by the world's greatest craftsmen of the mystery—such men and women as John Dickson Carr, Dorothy L. Sayers, Brett Halliday, Ray Bradbury, Craig Rice, Lawrence Blochman, all of whom you will find in this issue, and dozens of others who will appear in the issues to come.

These stories, both new and old, will be the finest I can collect for your enjoyment. They will have mystery, suspense, inventiveness, color—and above all they will be good reading, just as I try to make The Mysterious Traveler on the air good listening.

I hope you will enjoy this magazine, now in your hands for the first time. I hope also that you will let me know if it satisfies you, what kind of stories you would prefer to see in future issues, the titles of any favorite stories you would like me to bring back into print again, or any other comments you wish to make. Write me at: Studio 4, 105 East 15th St., New York 3, New York. And now I invite you to begin our first trip together in print with one of John Dickson Carr's most unusual and least known short stories, "The Other Hangman," which begins on the opposite page. Good reading!

Yours sincerely,

The Mysterious Traveler

Tales of the Mysterious Traveler
- Tales of the Mysterious Traveler #7 (March 1958)

Publication information
- Publisher: Charlton Comics
- Schedule: Bimonthly
- Format: Ongoing series
- Genre: FantasyMystery
- Publication date: vol. 1: Aug. 1956 – June. 1959; Vol. 2: Oct. 1985 – Dec. 1985
- No. of issues: Vol. 1: 13; Vol. 2: 2
- Main character: Mysterious Traveler

Creative team
- Written by: Joe Gill; Steve Ditko
- Artist(s): Steve Ditko; Dick Giordano; Rocco Mastroserio
- Editor: Joe Gill

== Comic books ==
Trans-World Publications' one-shot Mysterious Traveler Comics #1 (Nov. 1948) had a direct tie-in with the radio series, including the story "Five Miles Down", taken directly from an episode scripted for the radio program. Only a single issue was published.

Charlton Comics published a separate Tales of the Mysterious Traveler comic book for 13 issues from 1956 to 1959, followed by two more issues in 1985 shortly before the company went under. Steve Ditko illustrated many stories in this title. Stories intended for future issues saw print in Renegade Press's Murder. In 1990, Eclipse Comics published a large-format paperback collecting 19 Ditko stories from the Charlton title. Some of those stories were reprinted in Pure Imagination's Steve Ditko Reader.

== Short story and biography ==
Anthony Boucher's 1950 detective story anthology, Four-and-Twenty-Bloodhounds, paired each story with a brief biography of the detective. In the case of "The Big Money" by Robert Arthur, Boucher apologized to the reader:

The most disquieting moment in editing this anthology came when I received the biographical questionnaire filled in by the Mysterious Traveler. In answer to the first blank, born __, he had simply inserted: ?. And the succeeding answers were equally disconcerting and not in all cases publishable—though I have forwarded a copy to Miskatonic University for its files. Suffice it that no one—not even his nominal creators, Robert Arthur and David Kogan—knows whether the Traveler is detective, criminal or neither. He is only a sly, insinuating, knowing voice heard weekly over MBS, and here makes his first appearance anywhere in print.

== Influence ==
Writer Harlan Ellison, in a 1981 column, wrote that he stumbled across a particular episode of Quiet, Please in his childhood. He remembers the title of that episode as "Five Miles Down." Ellison writes, "I heard something I have never forgotten... What I heard that Sunday afternoon, so long ago, that has never left my thoughts for even one week, through all those years, was this:

"There is a place just five miles from where you now stand that no human eye has even seen. It is...five miles down!"

Ellison goes on to relate the plot (at least as he remembers it after several decades, admitting that time might have altered some of the details), and asks, "[H]ow many stories you heard or saw or read fifteen years ago, ten years ago, even five years ago...do you remember that clearly today? And I heard 'Five Miles Down' at least forty years ago. And it's still with me."

Ellison's recollection was inaccurate: he relates the story being broadcast "early in the Forties" on Quiet, Please when it was in fact a late-1940s episode of The Mysterious Traveler.

In 2004, Ellison took part in a recreation of the "Five Miles Down" script from The Mysterious Traveler (by Robert Arthur and David Kogan) at a convention of the Society to Preserve and Encourage Radio Drama, Variety and Comedy. He "acted and helped direct the show" and recalled hearing the episode when he was growing up.

== See also ==
- List of Charlton Comics publications
- The Whistler

== Listen to ==
- The Mysterious Traveler 70 single episodes – OTRR official – stream and download
- OTR Network Library: The Mysterious Traveler (65 1938–52 episodes) RealPlayer required. The first of the 66 episodes available is actually from The Mercury Theatre on the Air, not the Mysterious Traveler
- The Mysterious Traveler radio shows (seven 1944–1951 episodes)
- The Mysterious Traveler (77 episodes on the Internet Archive)
