= Conservative talk radio =

Talk radio format

Conservative talk radio is a talk radio format in the United States and other countries devoted to expressing conservative viewpoints of issues, as opposed to progressive talk radio. The definition of conservative talk is generally broad enough that libertarian talk show hosts are also included. The format has become the dominant form of talk radio in the United States since the 1987 abolition of the fairness doctrine.

In the United States, the format has included personalities such as Rush Limbaugh, Mark Levin, Glenn Beck, Ben Shapiro, Sean Hannity, Charlie Kirk, Michael Savage, Larry Elder, Dennis Prager, Jim Quinn, Lars Larson, Joe Pags, Bill O'Reilly, Laura Ingraham, Michael Medved, Oliver North, Dan Bongino, Ken Matthews, and Jerry Doyle.

== History ==
=== Early years ===
Notable early conservatives in talk radio ranged from commentators such as Paul Harvey and Fulton Lewis (later succeeded by Lewis's son, Fulton Lewis III) to long-form shows hosted by Clarence Manion, Bob Grant, Alan Burke, Barry Farber and Joe Pyne. Because of the Fairness Doctrine, a Federal Communications Commission (FCC) policy requiring controversial viewpoints to be balanced by opposing opinions on air, conservative talk did not have the dominance it gained in later years, and liberal hosts were as common on radio as conservative ones. Furthermore, the threat of the Fairness Doctrine discouraged many radio stations from hiring controversial hosts.

By the 1980s, AM radio was in severe decline. Top 40 radio had already migrated to the higher fidelity of FM, and the few remaining AM formats, particularly country music, were headed in the same direction or, in the case of formats such as MOR, falling out of favor entirely. Talk radio, not needing the high fidelity required for music, became an attractive format for AM radio station operators. However, in order to capitalize on this, operators needed compelling content.

=== Deregulation of talk radio ===
Conservative talk radio did not experience its significant growth until 1987, when the Federal Communications Commission (FCC) voted to abolish the Fairness Doctrine. The Fairness Doctrine had previously required radio stations to present contrasting views. Subsequent to the FCC's decision to stop using the rule, radio stations could then choose to be either solely conservative or solely liberal.

Another form of deregulation from the American government came from the Telecommunications Act of 1996, which allowed companies to own more radio stations and for some shows to become nationally syndicated. Before the deregulation, radio stations were predominantly owned by local community leaders. In 1999, following the passage of the Telecommunications Act of 1996, more than 25% of US Radio stations had been sold, with many more being sold each day. As of 2011, Clear Channel Communications (now iHeartMedia), an industry giant owns over 800 radio stations across the United States, and its largest contract is with Rush Limbaugh, worth $400 million over a span of 8 years.

Clear Channel Communications rose to become a major figure in talk radio in the United States; although it only owned one major "flagship" caliber radio station (KFI Los Angeles), Clear Channel owned a large number of key AM stations in other large markets, allowing it to establish a national presence. Thus, the deregulation from the abolishment of the Fairness Doctrine and the institution of the Telecommunications Act of 1996 have assisted conservative talk radio as a whole gain popularity throughout the United States.

=== Rise of conservative talk radio ===
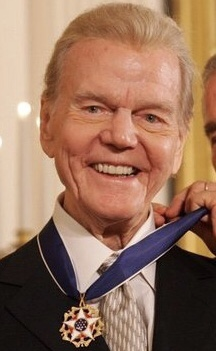
Paul Harvey receiving the Presidential Medal of Freedom in 2005

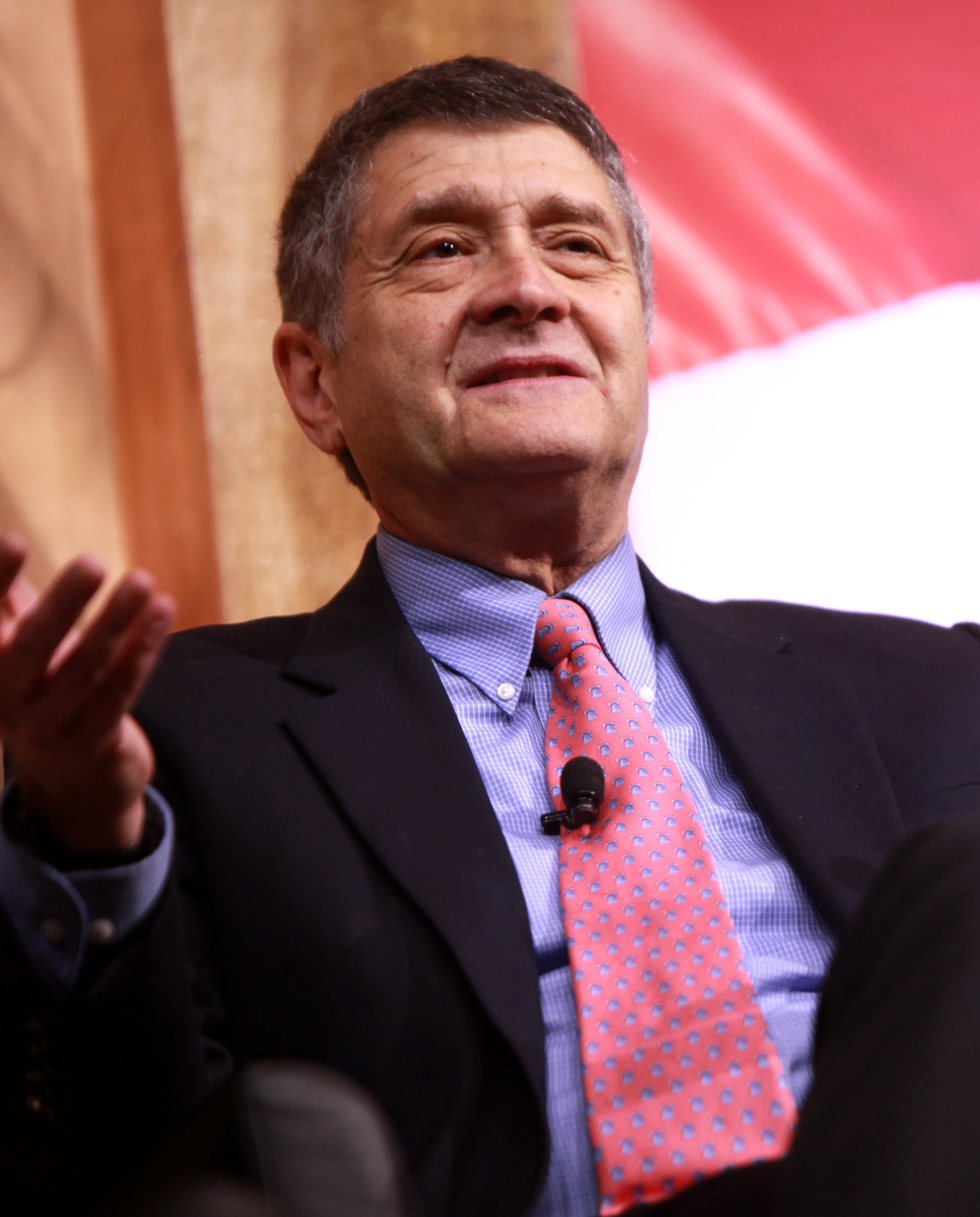
Michael Medved, originally a film critic, joined the early wave of conservative talk hosts in the 1990s.

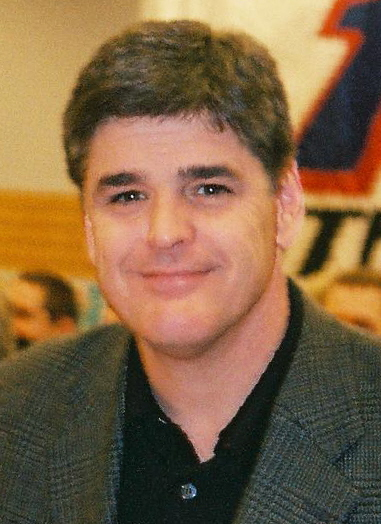
Sean Hannity was part of the early 2000s wave of new national conservative talkers.

Within the next decade, conservative talk radio became the dominant form of commercial talk radio in the United States; those stations that had homogenized to an all-conservative format soon came to garner more listeners than those that followed the older full-service model (at the time, progressive talk radio did not have enough hosts for a station to field an all-liberal lineup, despite the efforts of populist Chuck Harder). By 1991, Limbaugh had become the number one most syndicated radio host and AM radio had been revived.

With multiple large-market stations now owned by a small number of companies, syndicated programs could be disseminated more easily than before. During the late 1990s, political talk radio (other than Limbaugh) was still only a portion of the talk radio environment; other subgenres such as lifestyle talk (Laura Schlessinger), truck talk (Bill Mack, Dale Sommers) or paranormal talk (Art Bell's Coast to Coast AM) and general interest political interviews and talk (Jim Bohannon, Joey Reynolds) generally made up AM talk stations’ lineups.

The September 11 attacks brought on a wave of nationalism and a desire to rally around the United States and its government, which was led at the time by the Republican Party. This environment led to a large increase in national conservative talk radio hosts: The Glenn Beck Program, The Sean Hannity Show, The Laura Ingraham Show, Batchelor and Alexander (which follows a news magazine format) and The Radio Factor all launched into national syndication at this time; The Savage Nation, which had launched nationwide a year prior, saw a large increase in syndication around this time as well.

The success of conservative talk radio led to imitation attempts with progressive talk radio in the mid-2000s, led by the launch of Air America Radio. However, Air America suffered from weaker stations and inexperienced management and ceased operations in 2010. By the end of the decade, the format was near extinction. Even longtime noncommercial progressive talk outlet Pacifica found itself in serious financial difficulties, being forced to end local operations of its New York outlet WBAI in 2019 (then forced to resume them after the station's workers revolted).

== Audience and advertising ==
Listeners of conservative talk radio in the United States have predominantly been white and religious Americans as they are more prone to being ideological conservatives. Furthermore, men were more likely to be listeners of conservative talk radio than women. Recent Arbitron polls have shown that the vast majority of conservative talk radio station listeners are males over the age of 54, with less than 10 percent of the listener base aged 35 to 54. It is also shown that less than one tenth of one percent of conservative talk radio listeners participate (or call in) to the hosts to make comments.

This specific knowledge of the audience assists advertisers in their goal to attract potential customers, and the stations found that listeners of conservative talk radio are more involved and responsive in AM radio in comparison to music listeners of FM radio. Talk radio programs allow for a more personal approach to their shows, which helped contribute to the rise of revenue and popularity of conservative talk radio stations:

"Glenn Beck's relationship with Goldline International is illustrative. When he tells listeners to his radio program that these perilous times make gold an attractive investment, it helps Goldline's potential investors overcome concerns about the wisdom of moving into a market they likely have little understanding of. If Glenn Beck says gold is a good investment, many in Beck's audience are going to feel that he is giving trustworthy advice. Because the host is already talking, the segue into or out of a commercial can be relatively seamless."

Thus, advertisers have found that AM listeners have more trust in the radio personality and use that to their advantage.

== Controversy ==
=== "Push-and-pull" effect ===
Talk radio, has been described as indulging in "edgier" content than network TV conservative political programs on Fox News, etc., which have a broader audience that includes non-right-wing viewers. Radio hosts' remarks on "race, immigration and other subjects" can be more extreme, listeners who call in are more likely "to say what they really think", which gives "the shows a renegade feel and keep listeners loyal and emotionally invested". But the advertisers—on which the hosts depend for their "multimillion-dollar paychecks"—can be subject to boycott campaigns when word gets out on beyond the right-wing community about what the hosts and callers have said. Consequently, the host often engage in "push-and-pull" — stoking "listeners' anger" to build ratings, but then pulling back and "disavowing the more extreme views voiced by callers" to avoid a backlash from moderate and liberal public.

Prior to the January 6, 2021 storming of the United States Capitol, radio hosts were prone to making statements such as the following:

- "It is time to rip and claw and rake, It is time to go to war, as the left went to war four years ago." (Glenn Beck, January 4, 2021)
- Since stealing elections "is becoming the norm for the Democrat Party", conservatives need to "crush them, crush them. We need to kick their ass."(Mark Levin)
- "I will never surrender and collapse and act as if it's OK when hundreds of thousands have voted illegally." (Bill Cunningham, a syndicated host in Cincinnati, January 4)
- "There's no doubt this [the 2020 presidential election] was stolen. No doubt whatsoever." (Sean Hannity, December 18, 2020):
- Joe Biden "didn't win this thing [the 2020 United States presidential election] fair and square, and we are not going to be docile like we've been in the past, and go away and wait till the next election." (Rush Limbaugh, December 16, 2020)

But later in his December 16 show, Limbaugh said that he had "mixed emotions" about the January 6 march on Washington. In a December 9, 2020 show, Limbaugh declared, "I actually think that we're trending toward secession", and the next day said, "I am not advocating it [secession], have not advocated it, never have advocated it, and probably wouldn't". When a caller to Sean Hannity's January 5 show referred to the Democratic governor of Michigan Gretchen Whitmer as "Governor Hitler", Hannity responded, "easy, now. When you make those references, everyone says, 'Hannity allowed someone to make a Nazi comparison!'"

=== Rush Limbaugh–Sandra Fluke controversy ===
One boycott campaign was instigated during the Rush Limbaugh–Sandra Fluke controversy that spanned from February to March 2012, in which Rush Limbaugh made comments against a Georgetown University Law student, Sandra Fluke, who had been active advocating for including birth control in government-mandated health insurance even when the payer was a Catholic institution. Limbaugh called her a "slut" and "prostitute" under the logic that demanding birth control coverage was the equivalent of demanding "that she ... be paid to have sex", and that in return for insurance coverage, Fluke should be required to "post the videos" of her having sex online.

So, Ms. Fluke and the rest of you feminazis, here's the deal. If we are going to pay for your contraceptives, and thus pay for you to have sex, we want something for it, and I'll tell you what it is. We want you to post the videos online so we can all watch.

Limbaugh continued to dwell on Fluke and her alleged sex life the next day with him saying things like if his daughter had testified that "she's having so much sex she can't pay for it and wants a new welfare program to pay for it", he would be "embarrassed" and "disconnect the phone", "go into hiding", and "hope the media didn't find me". In response to Limbaugh's remarks Fluke accused him of attempting to silence her. Several online and social media campaigns were created such as a Flush Rush group on Facebook and the Stop Rush database. As a result, by March 3, over a dozen advertisers had discontinued their sponsorship.

On that day, Limbaugh made a public apology on his show, stating that "... My choice of words was not the best, and in the attempt to be humorous, I created a national stir. I sincerely apologize to Ms. Fluke for the insulting word choices." Fluke replied that she didn't think his apology under boycott pressure changed anything. In response to these events, 12 sponsors withdrew their support of Limbaugh's show.

Sean Hannity and Michael Savage

Sean Hannity and Michael Savage, two nationally syndicated hosts, began a feud that began in January 2014. The conflict started when Savage decided to move the live broadcast of his show, The Savage Nation, from his original 6-9 p.m. ET timeslot (which is timed to mid-afternoon in the Pacific Time Zone; Savage originates his program from San Francisco, and it was formerly an afternoon drive show for that market) to 3–6 p.m. ET, directly challenging the New York-based Hannity on the East Coast after Cumulus Media dropped Hannity's show from their stations in major markets and picked up Savage from the Talk Radio Network to be syndicated by their Westwood One division.

== Internet broadcasting ==
A few conservative talk radio hosts also syndicate their shows on the internet. In 2011, Glenn Beck started his own television channel initially through Viacom networks. However, as of 2014 Suddenlink Communications is the outlet for the channel. TheBlaze, which also has an internet-radio component on their website employs Beck and many other hosts on their shows. The radio channel, TheBlaze Radio Network broadcasts on the internet as well as on satellite radio, Sirius XM. Rush Limbaugh's radio show is also streamed on the internet through iHeartRadio, which ClearChannel Communications owns as well.

== Future ==
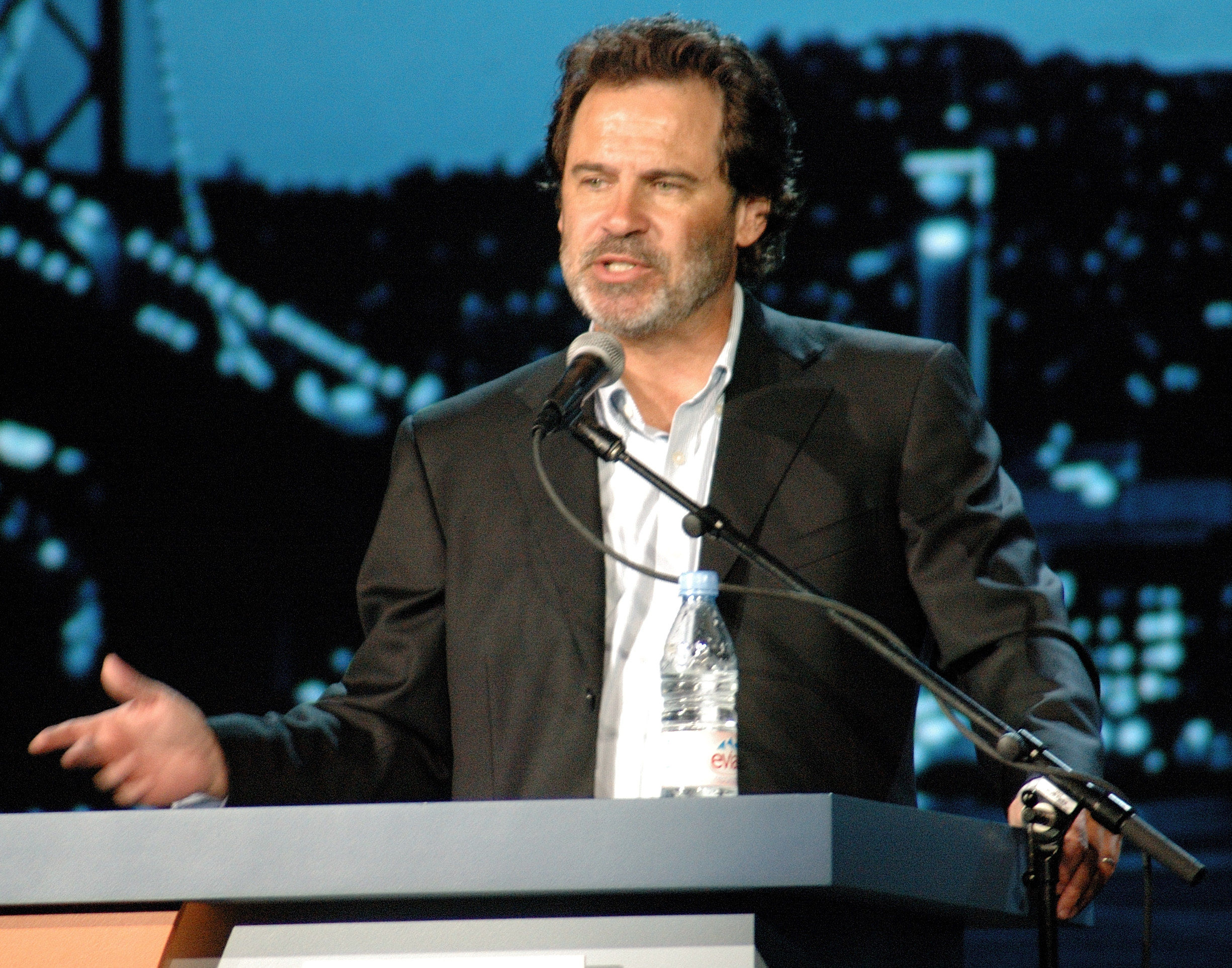
Dennis Miller, with no prior radio broadcasting experience, hosted a national conservative talk show from 2007 to 2015.

There has been a relative dearth of new radio hosts launched into national syndication since the late 2000s, in part due to personnel declines at local talk stations; most new national hosts have jumped to talk radio from other media (examples include Dennis Miller, a stand-up comic; Fred Thompson, Herman Cain and Mike Huckabee, all former Republican presidential candidates; the late Jerry Doyle, an actor; and Erick Erickson, a professional blogger). This has also opened up opportunities for less orthodox hosts than were common in the 1990s and 2000s; civil libertarian/nationalist Alex Jones, who spent most of the 2000s as a radio host heard primarily on shortwave, began securing syndication deals with mainstream conservative-talk radio stations during the presidency of Barack Obama.

The genre had also lost ground in listenership. By 2014, Limbaugh had been moved to less-listened-to stations in a number of major markets including New York, Los Angeles and Boston, and was no longer the most-listened-to radio host in the United States. In that position for over a decade, by this point classic hits disc jockey Tom Kent had surpassed Limbaugh estimating he had nearly 10 million more listeners across his numerous programs; though unlike Limbaugh, Kent hosts multiple shows, tallying at least 50 hours a week on air, spanning numerous formats from classic hits to top-40 radio, as opposed to Limbaugh's singular three-hour daily program. NPR's drive time programs, Morning Edition and All Things Considered, surpassed Limbaugh in 2016. Conservative talk shows on terrestrial radio also faced growing competition from digital outlets, such as satellite radio and podcasts (such as The Joe Rogan Experience), with Nielsen Audio also reporting declining listenership in talk radio in general among young adults.

Limbaugh died in February 2021 following a one-year bout with lung cancer; after a run of curated reruns with guest hosts, the show's distributor Premiere Networks introduced The Clay Travis and Buck Sexton Show as a successor in its time slot, which is hosted by sports radio personality Clay Travis and conservative pundit Buck Sexton.

Lingering fallout from the Limbaugh-Fluke controversy has continued to make advertising sales exceptionally difficult for the format. Buddy Shula, the owner of radio station WUSW, remarked in October 2026 that in fifteen months of owning the station and attempting to maintain a conservative talk format, he had sold less commercial time than he had sold in the first four hours of the classic country format he adopted afterward.

== See also ==
- Media bias in the United States
- Trash radio, a conservative radio talk genre in Quebec, Canada
