= MCH =

MCH may refer to:

== Biology and medicine ==
- Mean corpuscular hemoglobin or mean cell hemoglobin
- Maternal and child health
- Melanin concentrating hormone
- Molecular clock hypothesis
- Microfibrillar collagen hemostat
- Master of Surgery, written as either M.Ch. or Ch.M.

== People and entities ==
- Michael C. Hall, actor
- New Zealand's Ministry for Culture and Heritage

== Places ==
- Ehime Prefectural Matsuyama Central Senior High School, Matsuyama, Ehime, Japan
- Machala, Ecuador (IATA airport code MCH)
- March railway station, England (National Rail station code MCH)
- MCH Arena, football stadium in Herning, Denmark, home to FC Midtjylland
- Mitcham railway station, Melbourne, station code MCH
- Municipal Corporation of Hyderabad, the predecessor to Greater Hyderabad Municipal Corporation

== Other uses ==
- Memory Controller Hub, another name for the Northbridge or host bridge, a microchip on some PC motherboards
- MicroTCA Carrier Hub, a component of the MicroTCA embedded computing standard
- Mutual Cadena Hispánica, the defunct Spanish-language sister radio network to the defunct Mutual Broadcasting System
