= Mutual Broadcasting System =

American radio broadcasting network (1934–1999)

- Type: Radio network: Cooperative (1934–1952); Corporate-controlled (1952–1999)
- Country: United States; Canada (limited)

Ownership
- Parent: General Tire (1952–1957); Armand Hammer (1957–1958); Scranton Lace Company (1958–1959); Malcolm Smith (1959); Robert F. Hurleigh (1959–1960); 3M Company (1960–1966); Mutual Broadcasting Corp.; (1966–1977); Amway (1977–1985); Westwood One (1985–1999)

History
- Founded: September 29, 1934 (92 years ago)
- Closed: April 17, 1999; (64 years, 200 days)

Coverage
- Affiliates: 4 founders (1934); 104 (1938); 384 (1945); 543 (1950); 443 (1960); 950 (1979); 810 (1985); approx. 300 (1999)

The Mutual Broadcasting System (commonly referred to simply as Mutual; sometimes referred to as MBS, Mutual Radio or the Mutual Radio Network) was an American commercial radio network in operation from 1934 to 1999. In the golden age of U.S. radio drama, Mutual was best known as the original network home of The Lone Ranger and The Adventures of Superman and as the long-time radio residence of The Shadow. For many years, it was a national broadcaster for Major League Baseball, the National Football League, and Notre Dame Fighting Irish football. From the 1930s until the network's dissolution in 1999, Mutual ran a respected news service with news and commentary programs. In the 1970s, Mutual pioneered the nationwide late night call-in talk radio program, introducing the country to Larry King and Jim Bohannon.

In the 1970s, Mutual launched four sister radio networks: Mutual Black Network, Mutual Cadena Hispánica, regional outlet Mutual Southwest Network, and Mutual Progressive Network. For decades, Mutual had the largest number of affiliates but an uncertain financial position. For the first 18 years of its existence, Mutual was owned and operated as a cooperative. Mutual's member stations shared their own original programming, transmission and promotion expenses, and advertising revenues. From December 30, 1936, when it debuted in the West, the Mutual Broadcasting System had affiliates from coast to coast. Its business structure would change after General Tire assumed majority ownership in 1952 through a series of regional and individual station acquisitions.

Once General Tire sold the network in 1957 to a syndicate led by Armand Hammer, Mutual's ownership was largely disconnected from the stations it served, leading to a more conventional, top-down model of program production and distribution. Due to the multiple sales of the network that followed, Mutual was once described in Broadcasting magazine as "often traded". After a group that involved Hal Roach Studios purchased Mutual from Hammer's group, the new executive team was charged with accepting money to use Mutual as a vehicle for foreign propaganda on behalf of Rafael Trujillo's dictatorship in the Third Dominican Republic, while the network suffered significant financial losses and affiliate defections. It filed for Chapter 11 bankruptcy and was sold twice in the span of four months to raise enough money to remain operational. Its reputation was severely damaged, but rebounded under its succeeding owner, 3M Company. Sold to private interests in 1966 and to Amway in 1977, Mutual purchased two radio stations in New York and Chicago in the 1980s, but sold them after Amway's interest in radio broadcasting waned. In 1985, Radio syndicator Westwood One acquired Mutual and then acquired NBC Radio in 1987, gradually assimilating both networks' operations. Westwood One retired the Mutual name in April 1999.

== History ==
=== 1934–1935: The launch of Mutual ===
Attempts at establishing cooperatively owned radio networks had been made since the 1920s. In 1929, a group of four radio stations in the major markets of New York City, Chicago, Cincinnati, and Detroit organized into a loose confederation known as the Quality Network. Five years later (in 1934), a similar or identical group of stations founded the Mutual Broadcasting System. (Note: All available sources concur that Mutual cofounders WOR–Newark, N.J./New York, WXYZ–Detroit, and WLW–Cincinnati were also founding members of the Quality Network. Sources differ on whether WGN–Chicago, Mutual's fourth original member, or another Chicago station, WLS, represented the city in the Quality Network. In addition, there is no consensus on the fundamental matter of the degree of connection involved: some sources claim the Quality Network had ceased to exist by the end of 1929; others that it carried on and simply changed its name and formalized its structure in 1934. As scholar James Schwoch (1994) puts it, "The origins of the Mutual Broadcasting System are somewhat murky and open to dispute." Indeed, a claim Schwoch makes just two sentences later—that "the permanent establishment of the Mutual network is bound up in the popularity of a single radio program, 'The Lone Ranger'"—is disputed by several scholars. (Note: The following sources argue that Mutual was primarily a vehicle for The Lone Ranger. These sources, however, counterargue that Mutual was built on the popularity of Lum and Abner.)) Mutual's original participating stations were WOR in Newark, New Jersey, just outside New York (owned by the Bamberger Broadcasting Service, a division of R.H. Macy and Company; in 1949, WOR-TV would begin broadcasting and Bamberger would be renamed General Teleradio, due to General Tire & Rubber's increased investment in the TV station), WGN in Chicago (owned by WGN Inc., a subsidiary of the Chicago Tribune), WXYZ in Detroit (owned by Kunsky-Trendle Broadcasting), and WLW in Cincinnati (owned by the Crosley Radio Company). The network was organized on September 29, 1934, with the members contracting for telephone-line transmission facilities and agreeing to collectively enter into contracts with advertisers for their networked shows. WOR and WGN, based in the two largest markets and providing the bulk of the programming, were the acknowledged leaders of the group. On October 29, 1934, Mutual Broadcasting System, Inc. was incorporated, with Bamberger and WGN Inc. each holding 50 percent of the stock—five each of the ten total shares.

Lum and Abner, the latter of whom is seen in this advertisement, are reaching for a can of Horlick's. The malted milk maker sponsored the show during its entire run on Mutual. It left Mutual for NBC Blue after August 1935.

The three national radio networks already in operation—the Columbia Broadcasting System and the National Broadcasting Company's Red and Blue—were corporately controlled; programming was produced by the network (or by advertising agencies of program sponsors that purchased airtime on the network) and distributed to affiliates, most of which were independently owned. The Mutual Broadcasting System, on the other hand, operated as a true cooperative enterprise, with members creating and sharing programming. The majority of the early programming, from WOR and WGN, consisted of musical features and inexpensive dramatic serials. WOR had The Witch's Tale, a horror anthology series whose "hunner-an'-thirteen-year-old" narrator invited listeners to "douse all [the] lights. Now draw up to the fire an' gaze into the embers ...gaaaaze into 'em deep!... an' soon ye'll be across the seas, in th' jungle land of Africa ... hear that chantin' and them savage drums?" WGN contributed the popular comedy series Lum and Abner. Detroit's WXYZ provided The Lone Ranger, which had debuted in 1933 and was already in demand. It is often claimed that Mutual was launched primarily as a vehicle for the Western serial, but Lum and Abner was no less popular at the time. What WLW brought was sheer power; billing itself as "The Nation's Station", in May 1934 it had begun night broadcasting at a massive 500,000 watts, ten times the clear-channel standard.

On May 24, 1935, the network aired its inaugural live event—the first-ever night baseball game, between the Cincinnati Reds and the Philadelphia Phillies. In September, WXYZ dropped out to join NBC Blue, though contractual obligations kept The Lone Ranger on Mutual, airing three times a week, through spring 1942. The hole in the Detroit market was immediately filled by CKLW in Windsor, Ontario, just across the river. In October, the network began a decades-long run as broadcaster of baseball's World Series, with airtime responsibilities shared between WGN's Bob Elson and Quin Ryan and WLW's Red Barber (NBC and CBS also carried the series that year; the Fall Classic would air on all three networks through 1938). Mutual broadcast its first Notre Dame football game that autumn as well, beginning another relationship that would last for decades. As an income-generating business, the Mutual network was a modest endeavor at the start: in the first eleven months of 1935, the cooperative garnered $1.1 million in advertising, compared to NBC's $28.3 million and CBS's $15.8 million.

=== Late 1930s: National expansion ===
In the fall of 1936, Mutual lost another of its founding members when WLW departed. The network, however, was in the midst of a major expansion: the first outside group of stations to sign on with Mutual was John Shepard's Colonial Network with its Boston flagship station, WAAB, and thirteen affiliates around New England. There was good reason for this affiliation: Shepard had been involved with the founding of Mutual, and served on its board of directors. Cleveland's WGAR also became an affiliate, albeit a dual one, as they also held a primary NBC Blue hookup. WGAR was joined by five other Midwestern stations: KWK in St. Louis, Mo.; KSO in Des Moines, Iowa; WMT in Cedar Rapids, Iowa; KOIL in Omaha, Neb.; and KFOR in Lincoln, Neb. The big prize came in December, when the Don Lee Network, the leading regional web on the West Coast, left CBS to become a central participant in Mutual. Don Lee brought its four owned-and-operated stations—KHJ in Los Angeles, KFRC in San Francisco, KGB in San Diego, and KDB in Santa Barbara—along with six California affiliates and, via shortwave hookup, two more in Hawaii. Mutual now had a nationwide presence. During 1936, as well, an offer by Warner Bros. to purchase the network was apparently made and rejected.

In January 1937, ownership of WAAB was consolidated with that of another Boston station controlled by Shepard: WNAC was flagship of the Yankee Network, a circuit of New England radio stations whose membership partially overlapped with that of Colonial. Yankee flagship WNAC had been an affiliate of CBS Radio, changing affiliation to NBC Red later in 1937 when CBS purchased WEEI in that city. The Texas Network soon added twenty-three more stations to the Mutual affiliate roster. WGAR dropped both their Mutual and NBC Blue affiliations on September 26, 1937, to take CBS exclusively; in turn, WJAY (co-owned with WHK by the United Broadcasting Company, part of The Plain Dealer business) joined Mutual and changed calls to WCLE. The Mutual affiliation in Cleveland moved again in the fall of 1942 from WCLE to WHK, temporarily displacing Blue programming from the market entirely. By the end of 1938, Mutual had 74 exclusive affiliates; though the two leading radio network companies discouraged dual hookups, Mutual shared another 25 affiliates with NBC and 5 with CBS. The total of 104 affiliates put Mutual not far behind the leaders. Because of the corporate strength behind NBC and CBS, however, and the fact that the lion's share of the most powerful stations in the country had already signed with them before Mutual's emergence (the exceptional, and soon departed, WLW aside), the cooperative network would be at a permanent disadvantage.

==== Programming: The Shadow and diverse political voices ====
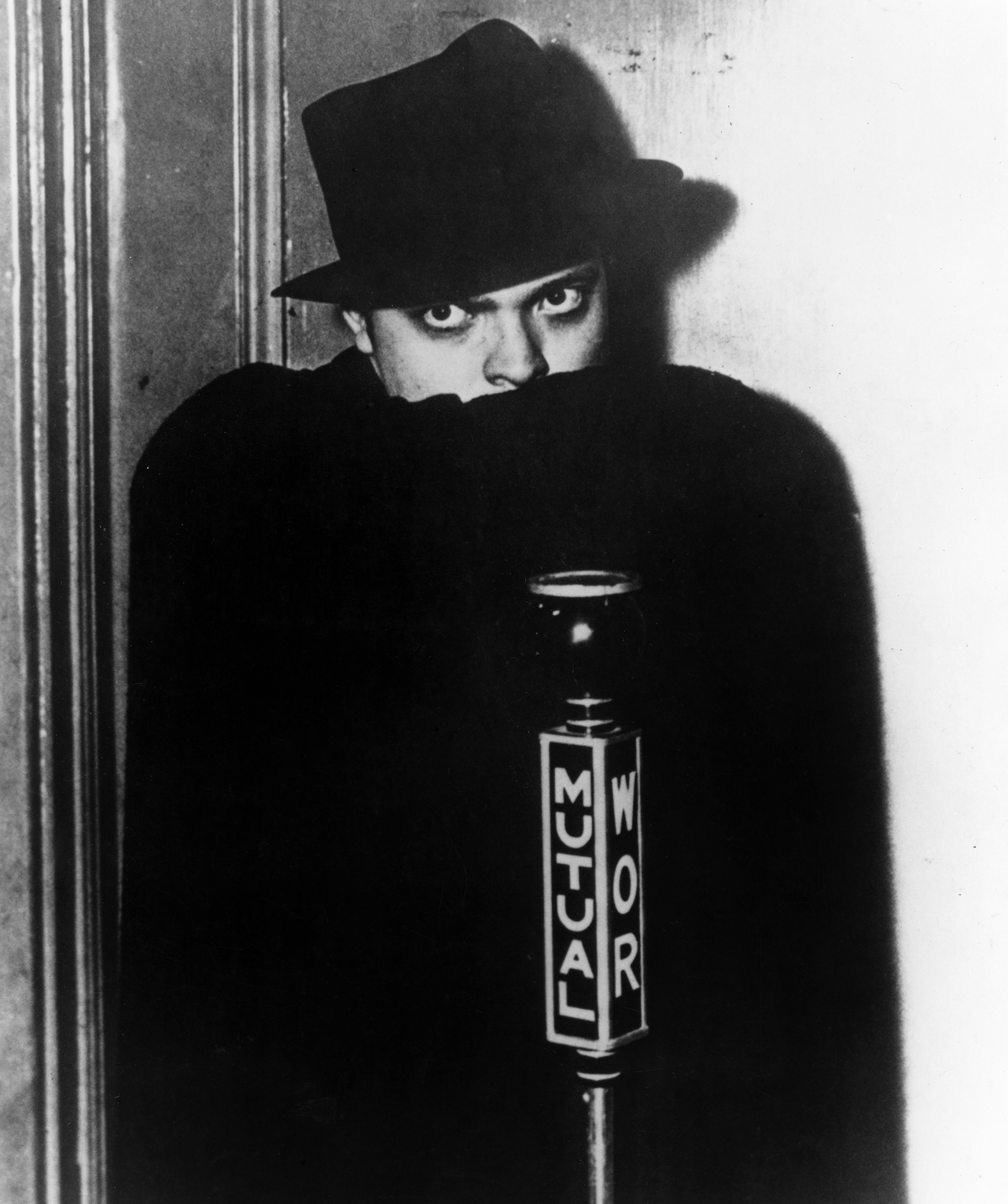
Orson Welles as The Shadow. A predecessor in the role delivered the show's intro, with its famous catchphrase, "Who knows what evil lurks in the hearts of men? The Shadow knows ...." According to historian Frank Brady, Welles's "voice as the 'invisible' Shadow was perfect." The intro, however, also called for a sinister chuckle; Welles's effort "seemed more an adolescent giggle than a terrifying threat."

On the programming front, 1936 saw Mutual launch the first network advice show, The Good Will Hour, hosted by John J. Anthony and sponsored by physical culture guru Bernarr Macfadden. The program was a new take on Ask Mister Anthony, which had aired on a local New York station in 1932, "dedicated to helping the sufferers from an antiquated and outmoded domestic relations code." Anthony, whose real name was Lester Kroll, brought a wealth of relevant experience to his work—he had once been jailed for failing to make alimony payments. In July 1937 came the premiere of a seven-part adaptation of Les Misérables, produced, written, and directed by Orson Welles and featuring many of his Mercury Theatre performers—Mercury's first appearance on the air. September 26, 1937, proved a particularly momentous date: that evening, The Shadow came to Mutual. (Note: Start and end dates for original dramatic and quiz series given in the main text are based on the standard and most comprehensive reference work, On the Air: The Encyclopedia of Old-Time Radio, by John Dunning. Dunning's detailed information has been checked, where available, against the even more detailed reports of Jerry Haendiges and against the much less detailed but more recently published The Encyclopedia of American Radio: An A–Z Guide to Radio from Jack Benny to Howard Stern, by Ron Lackmann. Dunning and Haendiges agree in almost all cases where they both cover a show. In the few cases where they differ slightly, a specific citation is given to the one whose data appears better supported, internally and/or by reference to Lackmann.) The show would become a mainstay of the network for more than a decade and a half and one of the most popular programs in radio history. For the first year of its Mutual run, Welles provided the voice of The Shadow and his newly created alter ego, Lamont Cranston. He played the part anonymously at first. But, as one chronicler put it, "nothing to do with Welles could remain a secret for very long."

In April 1938, the network picked up The Green Hornet from former member WXYZ. Mutual gave the twice-a-week series its first national exposure until November 1939, when it switched to NBC Blue. (The series would return very briefly to Mutual in the fall of 1940). Mutual also provided the national launching pad for Kay Kyser and his Kollege of Musical Knowledge radio show. Kyser's enormous success at Mutual soon allowed his show to move to NBC and its much larger audience. By May 1939, Mutual was broadcasting the Indianapolis 500. (Note: There are anecdotal suggestions that the network aired the Indianapolis 500 in previous years, but to date no concrete evidence has been found. For later Mutual coverage of the race, see:) That autumn, Mutual won exclusive broadcast rights to the World Series. As described in a 1943 Supreme Court ruling upholding the regulatory power of the Federal Communications Commission, Mutual "offered this program of outstanding national interest to stations throughout the country, including NBC and CBS affiliates in communities having no other stations. CBS and NBC immediately invoked the 'exclusive affiliation' clauses of their agreements with these stations, and as a result, thousands of people in many sections of the country were unable to hear the broadcasts of the games." This was the first instance of "abuses" committed by the two major broadcast companies given in the ruling.

Mutual also began building a reputation as a strong news service, rivaling the industry leaders in quality, if not budget. The broadcasts of WOR reporter Gabriel Heatter from the Lindbergh kidnapping "trial of the century" in 1935, heard over Mutual, were highly regarded; Heatter soon had his own regularly scheduled newscast, which aired nationally five nights a week. In 1936, also via WOR, Mutual began broadcasting the reports of news commentator Raymond Gram Swing, who became one of the country's leading voices on foreign affairs. In November 1937, conservative commentator Fulton Lewis Jr., heard five nights weekly from Mutual affiliate WOL, became the first national news personality to broadcast out of Washington, D.C.; he would remain with the network until his death almost three decades later. In 1938, Mutual started rebroadcasting news reports from the BBC and English-language newscasts from the European mainland. The network also began employing its own reporters in Europe as the continent headed toward crisis, including John Steele, Waverley Root, Arthur Mann, and Victor Lusinchi. Among these was Sigrid Schultz, the first accomplished female foreign correspondent to appear on American news radio.

=== 1940s: Becoming a radio network outside the "Big Three" ===
According to scholar Cornelia B. Rose, at the beginning of 1940, Mutual's corporate structure expanded its inclusivity:

Until January, 1940, six groups bore the expense of the network operation in varying degree: stations WGN and WOR owned all the stock of the corporation and guaranteed to make up any deficit; the Colonial Network in New England, the Don Lee System on the Pacific Coast, and the group of stations owned by the Cleveland Plain Dealer, participated in responsibility for running expenses. A new contract effective February 1, 1940, provides for contributing membership by all the above group[s] plus station CKLW in Detroit-Windsor. These groups now agree to underwrite expenses and become stockholders in the network.... An operating board for the network is comprised of representatives from each of these groups, together with additional representation appointed by other affiliated stations.

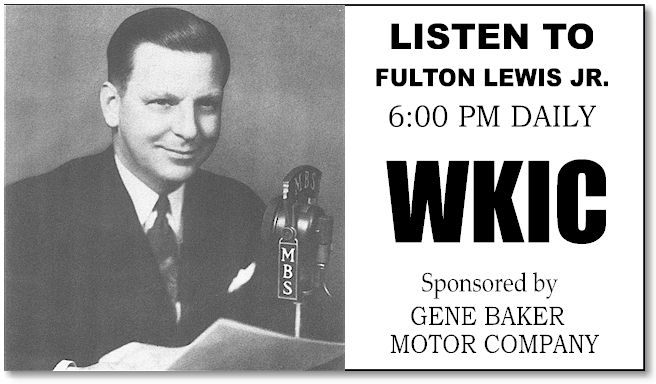
Mutual featured a variety of political voices, but none for so long as that of conservative commentator Fulton Lewis Jr. Many later pundits "copied his style—mocking, ridiculing, full of denials, full of sweeping generalizations, and full of inside-dopesterism." WKIC was Mutual's affiliate in Hazard, Kentucky.

The new cooperative structure was also joined by the owners of WKRC in Cincinnati, which had replaced Mutual cofounder WLW in that market. The Mutual corporation now had 100 shares, apportioned as follows:

Shareholders of the Mutual Broadcasting System, 1940
Shareholder	Lead station	Shares
Bamberger Broadcasting	WOR	25
WGN Inc.	WGN	25
Don Lee Network	KHJ	25
Colonial Network	WAAB	6
United Broadcasting	WHK	6
Western Ontario Broadcasting	CKLW	6
The Cincinnati Times-Star	WKRC	6
Fred Weber	Mutual general manager	1
Total		100

In 1941, WOR's official city of license was changed to New York. Within two years, the Colonial Network's affiliate roster and shares in Mutual had been fully absorbed into the Yankee Network by John Shepard III; WNAC was the sole flagship, WAAB having been moved to Worcester, in central Massachusetts, to avoid duopoly restrictions. With WBZ taking over the slot as the NBC Red affiliate in Boston, WNAC switched to Mutual. In January 1943, the Federal Communications Commission (FCC) approved the sale of the Yankee Network—with WNAC, its three other owned-and-operated stations, its contracts with 17 additional affiliates, and its Mutual shares—to the Ohio-based General Tire and Rubber Company.

By 1940, Mutual was already on par with the industry leaders in terms of affiliate roster size. (Note: The two available authoritative sources differ widely on the affiliate figures for the year. Media historians F. Leslie Smith et al. give Mutual—140, NBC—113 (53 with Red, 60 with Blue), and CBS—112. Media historian James Schwoch gives NBC—182, Mutual—160, and CBS—122. It is unclear what different methodologies were employed to produce these varying results.) Still, because Mutual affiliates were mostly in small markets or lesser stations in large ones, the network lagged way behind in advertising revenue—NBC took in eleven times as much as Mutual that year. (Note: For advertising sales in the first eight months of 1941, see "Happy Birthday MBS", from the September 15, 1941, issue of Time. NBC's take was now less than eight times as much as Mutual's. All available reports suggest that the gap did not close much further during the decade.) In 1941, the FCC, calling for NBC to divest one of its two networks, observed that the company "has utilized the Blue to forestall competition with the Red .... Mutual is excluded from, or only lamely admitted to, many important markets." On January 10, 1942, Mutual filed a $10.275 million suit against NBC and its parent company, RCA, alleging a conspiracy "hindering and restricting Mutual freely and fairly to compete in the transmission in interstate commerce of nationwide network programs." The FCC's Supreme Court victory in 1943 led to the sale of the Blue Network and Mutual dropping its lawsuit.

These developments appear to have been of more symbolic than practical value to Mutual—the transfer of the NBC Blue stations to the new American Broadcasting Company did little to help Mutual's competitive position. In 1945, it reached 384 affiliates, and by December 1948, Mutual Broadcasting was heard on more than 500 stations in the United States. But this growth did not reflect any ability on Mutual's part to attract leading stations from the corporate-controlled networks. Rather, the FCC had eased its technical standards for local stations, facilitating the establishment of new outlets in small markets. Between 1945 and 1952, the number of AM stations rose from around 940 to more than 2,350. It was these new, relatively weak stations that Mutual kept picking up. Though by now it had many more affiliates than any other U.S. radio network, for the most part they remained "less desirable in frequency, power, and coverage," as the Supreme Court had put it. For instance, in the postwar era, CBS and NBC covered all of North Carolina, each with only four stations. Mutual needed fourteen affiliates to deliver comparable statewide coverage.

Logo for KFRC, the Mutual station in San Francisco, owned by the Don Lee Broadcasting System

==== Mutual's involvement in television ====
Late in the 1940s, there was a brief exploration into the idea of launching a Mutual-branded television network, serious enough to prompt talks with Metro-Goldwyn-Mayer as a potential source of programming talent. Plans for the proposed Mutual-branded network advanced far enough that, at the annual meeting of Mutual stockholders in April 1950, network president Frank White made an official announcement of the planned creation of a limited five-station Mutual network (Boston-WNAC, New York City-WOR, Washington, D.C.-WOIC, Chicago-WGN, and Los Angeles-KHJ). At that same time Mutual radio station KQV in Pittsburgh, which was engaged in an ultimately unsuccessful attempt to get a television license, was reportedly hoping for their station to be a Mutual television affiliate. "Mutual Television Network" ended up being the decided-on branding for the Mutual-branded network. However, the 5-station Mutual network failed in short time, and Mutual became the only radio network outside the "Big Three" U.S. radio networks, even with a short-lived trial in TV, not to be long-term connected to (and eventually lose its dominance to) a television network. While the Mutual TV network was short-lived, this did not mean the group did not have an influence over commercial television's early development. Several Mutual radio affiliates launched their own television stations that would often be affiliated with the television networks of ABC, NBC, CBS or DuMont.

The cooperative also held the rights to a number of valuable radio properties that made the transition to the new medium possible, including two of the era's most popular variations on what would later become known as the tabloid talk show and "reality" programming: the crabby gabfest Leave It to the Girls and, in particular, Queen for a Day, which both started on Mutual radio in 1945. Referred to by some as a "misery show", Queen for a Day "awarded prizes to women who could come up with the most heart-stabbing stories told by the sick and the downtrodden .... On one show, a mother of nine requested a washing machine to replace one that broke when it fell on her husband and disabled him—and who, by the way, also needed heart surgery." In May 1947, a simulcast version began airing on the Don Lee system's experimental TV station in Los Angeles, W6XAO (later KTSL). It was a smash hit, and by the turn of the decade, TV stations all along the coast were broadcasting it to high ratings. (Note: Media historian Marsha Francis Cassidy also refers to Mutual's wish-fulfillment show Heart's Desire as one of those that "made the shift to local or regional television", but it has not been possible to confirm this. For a detailed account of this model of radio art, see:) In the 1950s, Mutual would stare down NBC for four years as the mighty network sought to take control of the show.

==== Programming: World War II and Superman ====
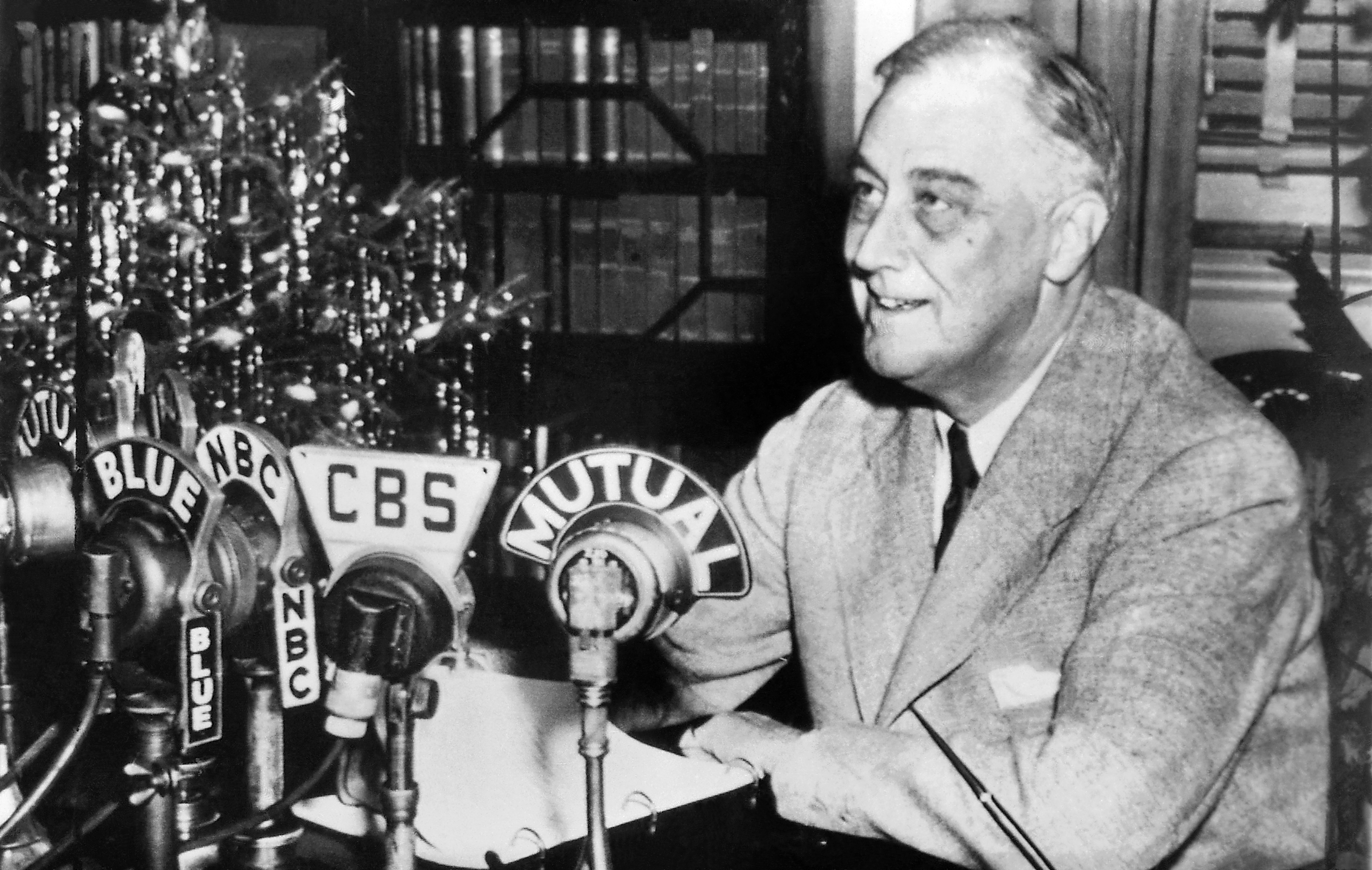
President Franklin D. Roosevelt at his home in Hyde Park, New York, December 24, 1943, delivering one of his nationwide radio 'Fireside chats' on the Tehran Conference and Cairo Conference

Offscreen, Mutual remained an enterprising broadcaster. In 1940, a program featuring Cedric Foster joined Mutual's respected schedule of news and opinion shows. Foster's claim to fame was as the first daytime commentator to be heard nationally on a daily basis. The network aired that year's NFL Championship Game on December 8, the first national broadcast of the annual event. Over the following half-decade, Mutual's war coverage held its own with that of the wealthier networks, featuring field correspondents such as Henry Shapiro and Piet Van T Veer and commentators such as Cecil Brown, formerly of CBS. At 2:26 p.m. Eastern time, on Sunday, December 7, 1941, Mutual flagship station WOR interrupted a football game broadcast with a news flash reporting the Japanese attack on Pearl Harbor. It was the first public announcement of the attack heard on the U.S. mainland. The first bombs had dropped 63 minutes earlier. In May 1945, Sigrid Schultz reported from one of the last Nazi concentration camps to be discovered, Ravensbrück. The following month, Meet the Press premiered with Martha Rountree as moderator. For a year and a half in the late 1940s, William Shirer came over from CBS to do current events commentary after his famous falling out with Edward Murrow. In 1948, Mutual's four-part series To Secure These Rights, dramatizing the findings of President Truman's Committee on Civil Rights, outraged many politicians and the network's own affiliates in the segregated South.

A recording session for The Mysterious Traveler, with the entire cast clustered around one microphone. Host Maurice Tarplin is directly behind the mic, third from the right. To the rear, a sound-effect artist and three phonographs (at least) provide music and effects.

In the field of entertainment, Mutual built on the incomparable success of The Shadow. WGN's Chicago Theater of the Air, featuring hour-long opera and musical theater productions before a live audience, was broadcast for the first time in May 1940. By 1943, the weekly show was being recorded in front of houses 4,000 strong, gathered to see performances featuring a full orchestra and chorus. Chicago Theater of the Air would run on Mutual through March 1955. Mutual provided an early national outlet for the influential, iconoclastic satirist Henry Morgan, whose show Here's Morgan began its network run in October 1940. Though The Lone Ranger moved over to NBC Blue in May 1942, within a few months Mutual had another reliable, and no less famous, action hero. The Adventures of Superman, picked up from WOR, would run on the network from August 1942 to June 1949. In April 1943, Mutual launched what would turn into one of its longest-lasting shows. Debuting as The Return of Nick Carter and later retitled Nick Carter, Master Detective, it would be a network staple through September 1955. From May 1943 through May 1946, Mutual aired The New Adventures of Sherlock Holmes starring Basil Rathbone and Nigel Bruce, reprising their roles from the Universal film series. An earlier incarnation of the show had run briefly on the network in 1936; a less starry version would return to Mutual from September 1947 through June 1949. The Mysterious Traveler, a proto–Twilight Zone anthology series, aired every week on Mutual from December 1943 until September 1952.

In February 1946, Mutual introduced a quiz show, Twenty Questions, that would run for more than seven years. In October, the detective series Let George Do It, starring Bob Bailey, launched as a Mutual/Don Lee presentation; it would also run into the mid-1950s. For two years, starting in 1946 as well, Steve Allen got his first network exposure on the Mutual/Don Lee morning show Smile Time, out of Los Angeles's KHJ. In February 1947, the religiously oriented Family Theater premiered; with frequent appearances by major Hollywood stars, the series aired on Mutual for ten and a half years. That March, Kate Smith, a major star on CBS since 1931, moved over to Mutual. During most of her initial run at the network, which lasted until September 1951, she had two distinct weekday shows, each 15 minutes long: Kate Smith Speaks, at noon, and Kate Smith Sings, later in the hour. The network gave an outlet to radio dramatist Wyllis Cooper and his highly regarded suspense anthology Quiet, Please, which ran on Mutual from June 1947 to September 1948. It also aired actor Alan Ladd's similarly lauded drama about a crime-solving mystery novelist, Box 13, which ran for precisely a year. Mayfair Productions, Ladd's own business, produced its 52 episodes, which began airing every Sunday on August 22, 1948.

=== 1950s: New ownership ===
==== General Tire asserts control, then sells ====
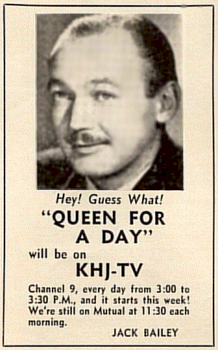
On the radio in the morning, on TV in the afternoon—audiences couldn't get enough of Queen for a Day. At the end of each episode, host Jack Bailey would proclaim, "We wish we could make every lady in America a queen for every single day!"

Toward the end of 1950, the executors of the estate of Thomas S. Lee (the son of Don Lee, who had died in 1934) liquidated the estate's broadcasting interests. The Don Lee Broadcasting System and its shares in Mutual were sold to General Tire for $12.3 million (equivalent to $165 million in 2025), which already had a sizable stake in Mutual via the Yankee Network. (Note: A scholarly journal article claims that the Don Lee purchase brought with it a "19 percent interest in the Mutual Broadcasting System," which would be down from the 25 percent of the 1940 restructuring. However, the reliability of this source is questionable, as it incorrectly claims in the same paragraph that the "East Coast-based Yankee Network ... was also acquired at this time" by General Tire. As detailed above, General Tire in fact acquired Yankee in 1943.) The sale prompted a challenge by Edwin W. Pauley, who led a failed bid for the group, claiming it violated Mutual bylaws stating no group could hold more than 25 percent of network stock. General Tire retained KHJ, KFRC and KGB, divesting the other stations. At the same time, Mutual acquired the television broadcast rights to the World Series and All-Star Game for the next six years. Mutual was likely re-indulging in TV network dreams or was simply taking advantage of a long-standing business relationship; in either case, Mutual sold the broadcast rights to NBC in time for the following season's games at an enormous profit. (Note: Marshall (1998) and Day (2004) describe the details of the original deal very differently, agreeing only that it was for six years at $1 million a year. Marshall says that a contract was signed on December 26, 1950, between baseball's major leagues, in the person of Commissioner Happy Chandler, on one side and Mutual and the Gillette Safety Razor Company on the other for the television rights. Day says baseball's contract was solely with Gillette, that it was for both radio and television rights, and that Gillette "[l]ess than a year after acquiring the broadcast rights ... transferred" them to Mutual. They also characterize the original contract rather differently. Marshall calls it "one of the outstanding achievements of the Chandler commissionership." Day credits Chandler with "deftly avoid[ing] a financial crisis," but agrees with the prevailing opinion of the players that Chandler "vastly underestimated the value" of the rights. The fact, which Day provides, that Mutual sold the package to NBC for $4 million a year lends support to his position.)

Early in 1952, General Tire purchased General Teleradio from R.H. Macy and Company. With the deal, General Tire acquired the WOR radio and TV stations and the rights to the General Teleradio brand, under which the company merged its broadcasting interests as a new division (Bamberger had previously sold its TV station in the nation's capital, WOIC, to CBS and the Washington Post). Most importantly, WOR's founding shares in Mutual, when added to the Yankee and Don Lee holdings, gave General Tire majority control of the network. General Tire head Thomas F. O'Neil, who had already taken over as president of the Don Lee stations, became president of Mutual in an executive shakeup.

While Mutual did have a short-lived TV network, (Note: short-lived 5-station network, as mentioned above in Mutual's involvement in television) it held rights to one of the most profitable shows in the medium: an early adaptation of Queen for a Day on General Teleradio/Don Lee's KHJ-TV boasted an audience triple that of the city's six other television stations combined. It was also the largest U.S. radio network in affiliate numbers, by far—it had around 560, almost three times as many as its most powerful competitors, CBS (194) and NBC (191). (Note: In August 1951, the low-powered, baseball-oriented Liberty Broadcasting System (LBS) had 431 affiliates.) Still, the radio industry started to feel effects of major advertisers abandoning radio for television, with commercial rates being cut among all four networks, Mutual included. O'Neil proposed a barter-style restructuring at a July 1953 affiliates' conference in Cape Cod, Massachusetts, called "The Cape Cod Plan": the network would provide five hours of sponsored programming daily and 14 hours of additional programming weekly that affiliates could sell commercial time for. The "Cape Cod Plan" eventually met with resistance from the affiliates, some of which saw it as an attempt by Mutual to make money at their expense; by the time of the next affiliates' conference in January 1954, O'Neil called the barter plan "dead".

In 1955, General Tire expanded its media holdings by acquiring RKO Pictures from Howard Hughes, renaming General Teleradio as RKO Teleradio Pictures. The next year, a Canadian subsidiary of RKO purchased a governing interest in Mutual shareholder, Western Ontario Broadcasting, owner of CKLW in Windsor, Ontario, which served the Detroit market. When the deal closed, two of Western Ontario Broadcasting's directors were U.S. citizens. RKO Teleradio Pictures also purchased Washington, D.C. station WGMS-AM-FM in April 1956, with WGMS joining Mutual. Closing the movie studio a year and a half later, the broadcasting division was renamed RKO Teleradio in 1957, and again to RKO General in 1958. The "Mutual Dealer Plan", another attempt to revamp the network's operations containing elements of the barter-style "Cape Cod Plan", was unveiled to affiliates at an April 1956 conference to favorable reception. The plan, however, could not prevent two remaining minority shareholders in Mutual from leaving: United Broadcasting's WHK switched to NBC in July, while founding station WGN became an independent on August 31, 1956, with ABC/Prairie Farmer-owned WLS becoming Mutual's Chicago affiliate.

By this point, Mutual was foundering. Even with the "Mutual Dealer Plan" and staff cutbacks, the network suffered a loss of $400,000 (equivalent to $4.59 million in 2025) in 1956. In early July 1957, advertisers were notified the network could end operations at the end of the month, one of three options General Tire was considering for Mutual. Another option—spinning off Mutual while retaining the stations that had given it control—was ultimately taken, as a group led by Dr. Armand Hammer bought the network later in the month. Limited sponsorship packages were also introduced, in which an advertiser could back a show for an abbreviated period rather than an entire season, but there was no reversing the trend of television usurping radio. The radio networks were left with the bills for an increasing number of sustaining programs, which had no sponsors. The loss of mainstay advertisers was accompanied by what historian Ronald Garay describes as the "mass desertion of network radio talent, management and technicians for television .... [and] these people were taking with them the programming that had popularized the radio networks."

==== Turmoil, propaganda allegations, and bankruptcy ====
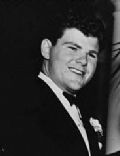
Hal Roach Jr.

The network soon changed hands again: in September 1958, it was acquired by the Scranton Lace Company for $2 million (equivalent to $22.3 million in 2025). Scranton was under the control of the F. L. Jacobs Company, whose chairman, Alexander Guterma, envisioned a media empire uniting Mutual with another purchase that year, Hal Roach Studios. Guterma's tenure as Mutual president was brief: he resigned on February 13, 1959, amid increasing financial shortfalls, overdue payments to affiliates, unpaid phone bills with AT&T, and an ongoing investigation by the U.S. Securities and Exchange Commission (SEC). Hal Roach Jr. took over as president, but the SEC labeled him "a Guterma puppet" due to how he assumed Guterma's shares and questioned his ability to run the network. A week after resigning, the SEC indicted Guterma on federal securities fraud charges, which led Roach to be removed as president of the film studio, though he retained his position as Mutual president. The SEC also ordered the suspension of trading in the shares of F. L. Jacobs Company.

Scranton was under pressure to sell Mutual. The March 9, 1959, issue of Broadcasting magazine stated Mutual had a deficit of $1.05 million (equivalent to $11.6 million in 2025) and was losing up to $100,000 a month. AT&T threatened to cut off Mutual's telephone service within 24 hours if all outstanding charges were not paid, which would sever the network from its affiliates. An attempt to sell the network to Max Factor collapsed after the cosmetics manufacturer could not find a way to create a tax advantage from the existing financial losses. When AT&T made another threat to disconnect phone service, network news director Robert F. Hurleigh engineered a last-minute deal with businessman Malcolm Smith, whose transaction to buy the network included $1 million of advertising time and payment of the outstanding AT&T phone bill, which totaled over $400,000. The deal, however, failed to stop KALL in Salt Lake City and its 41-station regional "Intermountain Network" from switching to ABC. The Don Lee Network folded on April 26, with all 20 affiliates switching from Mutual to ABC and ABC purchasing Don Lee's remaining programming. Yankee Network lead station WNAC severed ties with Mutual in August to become independent, but Mutual was allowed to affiliate with the other Yankee stations individually.

Mutual apparently refuses to believe that we have disaffiliated. We are sympathetic to their problem, but we have definitely affiliated with ABC Radio.

— Lynn Meyer, president of the Intermountain Network/KALL, on their March 1959 disaffiliation from Mutual

The troubles with Mutual worsened. While on a press junket to Ciudad Trujillo in May 1959, Hurleigh received confirmation that Dominican Republic dictator Rafael Trujillo secretly provided money to Guterma, Roach and Scranton Corp. vice president Garland Culpepper. Guterma accepted up to $750,000 from Trujillo, and in turn, Mutual newscasts were to have up to 425 minutes of puff pieces favorable to Trujillo's regime broadcast per month. One story read by Walter Winchell regarded plans by Hal Roach Studios to film future movies in the country, while another story about Castro allies planning attacks against the Trujillo regime was read by Fulton Lewis Jr.; assorted "news releases" were also sent intended for newscasts but never broadcast. Outraged over the arrangement, Hurleigh went to the U.S. Justice Department, which also received a complaint from a Trujillo lawyer after Guterma failed to give the money back. By September, Guterma was indicted for failing to register as a foreign agent, with Roach and Culpepper as defendants. Guterma, who pleaded no contest to the charge, was sentenced to federal prison for stock fraud, but it was never proven that he actually fulfilled his part of the deal and arranged for slanted coverage. Nonetheless, the incident, combined with the network's precarious financial position, led to a reported 130 stations ending their Mutual affiliations.

In the wake of the Trujillo scandal and affiliate defections, Smith sold Mutual to Hurleigh for $1 on July 1, 1959, which was followed by a voluntary Chapter 11 bankruptcy filing. Businessman Albert G. McCarthy took over operations, arranging to settle the network's over $3 million in debts (equivalent to $33.1 million in 2025) while seeking an owner interested in running it on an ongoing basis. WOR signed a new contract with Mutual despite previously indicating the station would drop the network, becoming the lone RKO Teleradio station to renew ties as WGMS, KFRC, KHJ and WHBQ joined WNAC in independence. At the same time, WOR started to identify as "WOR-AM-FM, owned by RKO General", eschewing on-air mentions of Mutual after listeners mistakenly thought WOR was also in bankruptcy; concurrently, Mutual changed their station cue to "the Network of Independent Stations". A three-part reorganization plan resolving all debts was approved in bankruptcy court on December 23, 1959, allowing Mutual to emerge from Chapter 11; a network spokesperson commented, "this means we start out with a clean slate; we are now divorced from any previous managements."

==== The Korean War and original drama's decline ====
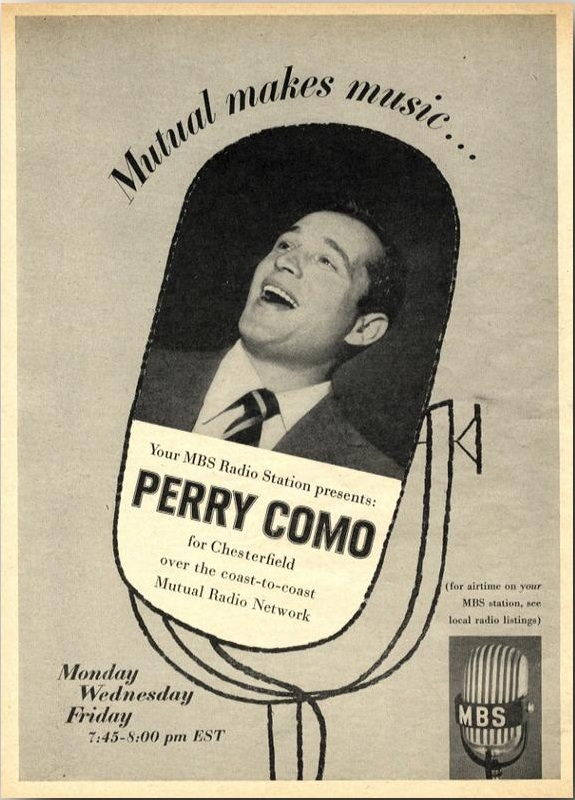
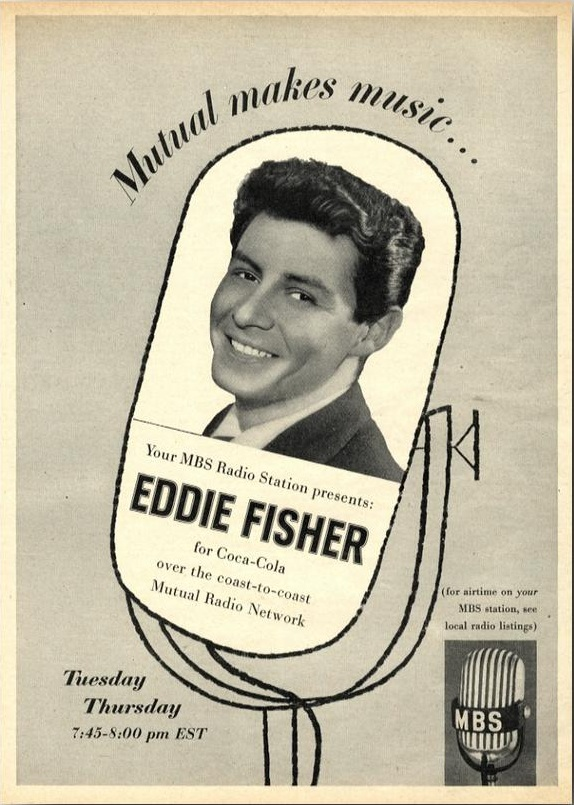
"Mutual makes music" with Perry Como and Eddie Fisher in 1954, the twilight of live entertainment and music on network radio.

Before the Guterma fiasco, the network had maintained its reputation for running a strong and respected news organization. As the conflict on the Korean peninsula began to escalate in mid-1950, Mutual began airing two special nightly reports on the situation, featuring the commentary of Major George Fielding Eliot, military analyst for CBS during World War II. Six correspondents, more than NBC or ABC, were working for Mutual in Korea by August 1950. On occasion, Mutual's commentary programs made the news: On March 11, 1954, Fulton Lewis Jr. featured Senator Joseph McCarthy as his guest, two days after the senator's ethics had been called into question on the CBS TV show See It Now, hosted by Edward R. Murrow. In his radio interview, McCarthy dismissed Murrow as "the extreme left-wing, bleeding-heart element of television." In 1957, Mutual refused to air an episode of Clarence Manion's Manion Forum featuring Herbert V. Kohler Sr. due to controversy over the Kohler strikes.

Mutual began the 1950s by entering the realm of adult science fiction with 2000 Plus on March 15, 1950, almost a month before NBC premiered the similarly themed Dimension X. The network picked up adventure series Challenge of the Yukon from ABC Radio, which originated at Mutual cofounder WXYZ in 1938 (but after the station left the network). Renamed Sergeant Preston of the Yukon, this show launched on Mutual on July 10, 1951. A partnership with Metro-Goldwyn-Mayer at the end of 1951 had the film studio supply up to six hours of programming per week starting in 1952 with The MGM Theater of the Air as its centerpiece, but the programs lasted for only one year. Another established drama, Phillips H. Lord's Counterspy, moved to Mutual in 1953 after a prior run on ABC. The network's other new offerings in 1953 were a further sign of the times—transcription reruns of Coke Time with Eddie Fisher (utilizing soundtracks from Fisher's NBC-TV show) and an audio simulcast of CBS-TV's Perry Como Chesterfield Show. The Shadow's long run finally ended in December 1954, followed by Sergeant Preston in June 1955. Gang Busters, another Lord serial that ran on ABC, CBS, and NBC throughout the 1940s and early 1950s, moved to Mutual in October 1955. In November 1957, the final episodes of Counterspy and Gang Busters aired, ending the network's last two remaining half-hour original dramatic shows. Mutual had forsworn the genre and would not broadcast a new dramatic series until 1973 with the short-lived Rod Serling vehicle The Zero Hour. (Note: For more on The Zero Hour, see:)

In 1955, the famous comedy team Bob and Ray came over from NBC for a five-day-a-week afternoon show. Kate Smith returned in January 1958 for her final radio series, which ran until August. In June 1958, just a few months before the Scranton takeover, the network had launched a nightly 25-minute newscast, The World Today, hosted by Westbrook Van Voorhis, famous as the voice of The March of Time. Sports began to occupy an increasing portion of Mutual's schedule: the network began regularly airing a Major League Baseball Game of the Day, every day except Sunday. This expansion into daily sports programming would run well into the 1960s. (Note: Radio historian Ronald Garay says Mutual launched its Game of the Day in 1949. Sports historians Jerry Gorman et al. say it was 1950. Garay indicates that the concept was picked up from the Liberty Broadcasting System, founded in 1947. Yet the National Baseball Hall of Fame lists among famed broadcaster France Laux's credits "Mutual Game of the Day (1939–41, '44)".) While baseball's World Series and All-Star Game would go to rival NBC in 1957, Mutual secured national radio rights to Notre Dame Fighting Irish football in 1954. The rights would switch between networks over the following decade before Mutual became the exclusive broadcaster in 1968, which would remain a cornerstone for the rest of the network's existence.

=== 1960s–1970s: Narrowed focus ===
==== From 3M to Amway ====
In the spring of 1960, the Minnesota Mining and Manufacturing Company (3M) stepped in, purchasing Mutual for about $1.3 million and restoring much-needed stability to the operation. Despite the late 1950s Guterma scandal, Mutual still had 443 affiliates, easily the most of any network. By this time, as historian Jim Cox describes, both Mutual and ABC "had largely wiped their slates clean of most of their network programming—save news and sporting events and a few long-running features". This would characterize Mutual's essential approach for the next three and a half decades, through a further series of ownership changes.

In July 1966, 3M sold the network to the privately held Mutual Industries, Inc., headed by John P. Fraim and Loren M. Berry, for $3.1 million (equivalent to $30.8 million in 2025); Fraim was vice president of Berry's Dayton, Ohio-based telephone directory publishing company. Upon Mutual Industries's acquisition of Mutual, it was renamed to "Mutual Broadcasting Corp.". The following month, after the death of Mutual stalwart Fulton Lewis Jr., his son Fulton Lewis III took over his nightly 7 p.m. slot. Another Ohio businessman, Daniel H. Overmyer, sought a merger with Mutual in 1967 amid plans to start his own TV network. The offer was rebuffed, but three Mutual stockholders joined eleven other investors to buy Overmyer's hookup and rename it the United Network. The network and its only offering, The Las Vegas Show, folded after only a month on the air.

When ABC Radio (Note: Not to be confused with ABC Audio.) "split" into four demographically targeted networks on January 1, 1968, Mutual unsuccessfully sued to block the move. Meanwhile, the network was undergoing some management instability, with frequent changes at the top. For example, Matthew J. Culligan was Mutual's president from October 1966 to June 1968. He was replaced by Robert R. Pauley, who came over from the ABC radio division, where he had served as president for nearly seven years. But Pauley only lasted a year, and resigned after clashes with the board over the need for cost-cutting, and other decisions with which he disagreed. His replacement was Victor C. Diehm, owner of several Mutual-affiliated radio stations and active on the Mutual Affiliates Advisory Council.

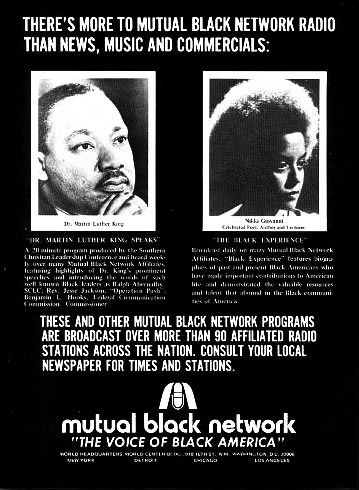
Advertisement for the Mutual Black Network, featuring Dr. Martin Luther King Jr. and poet Nikki Giovanni

Diehm was succeeded early in 1972 by C. Edward Little, a former executive and owner of Hollywood, Florida, Mutual affiliate WGMA. Little arrived in the position with a commitment to expand Mutual's news service and program offerings, conceding that Mutual had long been fourth among the legacy "big four" radio networks. Taking a page from ABC's move to split its radio network years earlier, Little launched two additional news services, the Mutual Black Network (MBN) and the Mutual Spanish Network (MSN; Mutual Cadena Hispánica, or MCH), on May 1, 1972. Targeting Black audiences, MBN supplied 100 five-minute-long news and sports reports weekly along with other programming, with MCH featuring similar fare aimed at Spanish-language listeners. By July 1972, Mutual had 550 affiliates, MBN had 55 and MCH had 21. While MCH lasted only six months, by 1974, MBN had grown to 98 affiliates. In 1973, Little oversaw the launch of the Mutual Progressive Network (MPN), a network news service that catered to rock-oriented stations; by 1980, MPN would re-brand to Mutual Lifestyle Radio, resulting in a format change to an adult contemporary style, with elements of light conversation, before completely ceasing operations in 1983.

In July 1974, Mutual introduced the distinctive two-toned "Mutualert" network cue tones heard at the beginning and end of newscasts and programs, between commercials and during network identification breaks. For the rest of its existence, Mutual would use these cue tones, dubbed "bee-doops" by listeners. Little later oversaw the 1978 launch of the Mutual Southwest Network, a regional "mininetwork" that handled distribution for the Dallas Cowboys Radio Network and featured Southwest Conference football games. In 1976, 49 percent of MBN ownership was sold to the Sheridan Broadcasting Corporation followed by the remaining 51 percent in 1979, at which point MBN was renamed the Sheridan Broadcasting Network and later merged into National Black Network to create American Urban Radio Networks.

Fraim and Berry initially had control over Mutual Broadcasting Corp., but investor Benjamin D. Gilbert and his wife quietly bought out their stakes as well as those of the other investors, becoming the group's principal owners. The Gilberts would attract unwanted attention for themselves over one particular program. In 1974, the Liberty Lobby, a think tank and lobby group that espoused far-right views and antisemitism, purchased airtime for a daily five-minute show, This Is Liberty Lobby, which also offered the organization's "America First" pamphlet at the end of every episode. While not directly from Mutual, it was made available to the network's over 600 stations, with 126 carrying it by July. The Anti-Defamation League alleged the Mutual connection came as the Gilberts personally contributed thousands of dollars to the Liberty Lobby since 1966. After refusing to transmit two specific episodes in November, Mutual cancelled the Liberty Lobby contract at year's end.

In the March 21, 1977, issue of Broadcasting magazine, publisher John P. McGoff disclosed he had been in talks to purchase Mutual. A competition in offered prices followed between Amway, a multi-level marketing company known for selling home care products, and Columbus, Georgia-based insurer American Family Corp., which dropped out after the offer price approached $20 million (equivalent to $106 million in 2025). On September 30, 1977, Amway bought the network. After the purchase, Mutual began to develop what would become the first nationwide commercial broadcast satellite network, leading to the end of decades of reliance on telephone lines for the broadcast industry's transmission capacity. This proposal received FCC approval in late 1979. The biggest change to Mutual happened in 1978, when Amway purchased WCFL from the Chicago Federation of Labor for $12 million (equivalent to $59.2 million in 2025); for the first time, the network founded by radio stations directly owned a station of its own, and in one of the country's largest markets. Mutual also reached its greatest number of affiliates that year with 950, fewer than ABC—whose multipronged approach had proven very successful—but far in front of NBC and CBS.

==== Rise of the call-in talk show ====
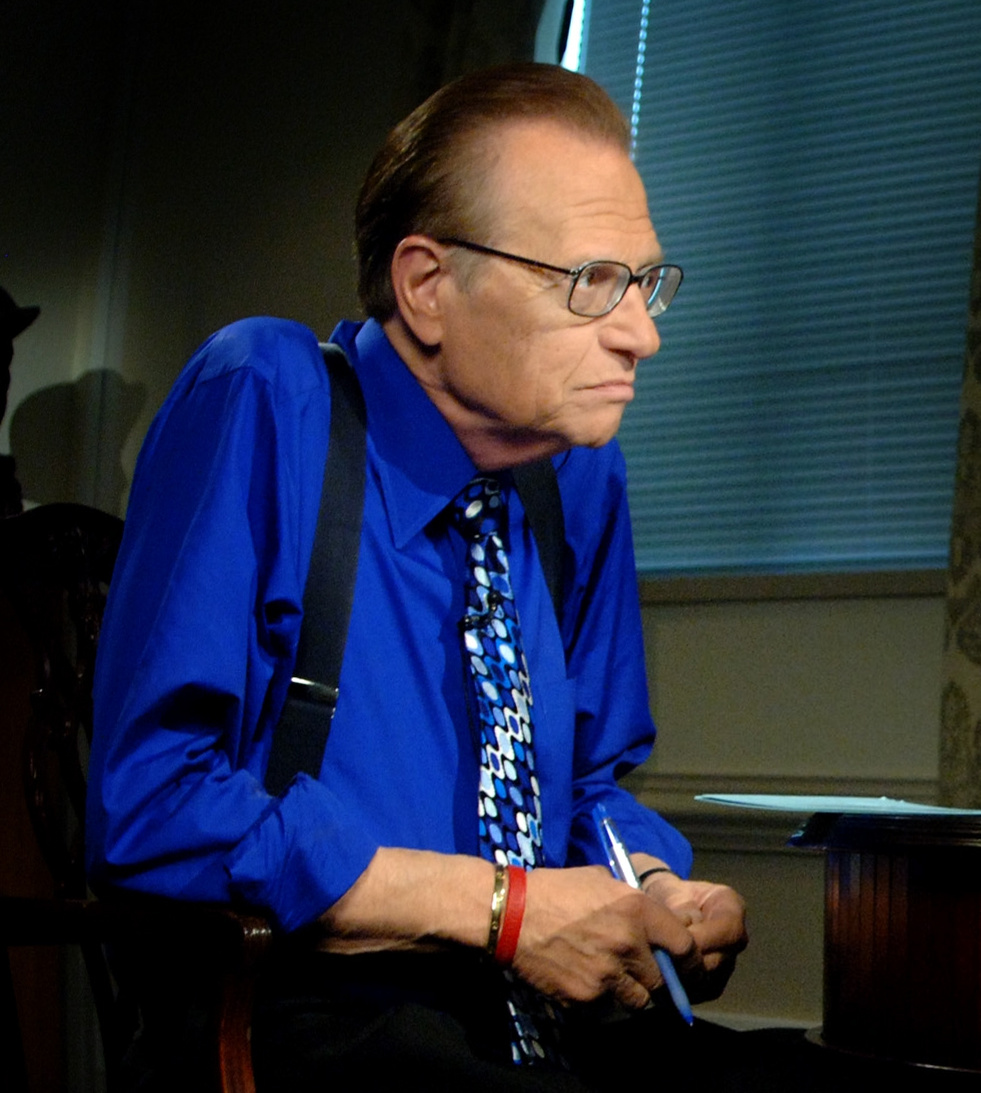
Larry King

Outside of news and sports, one of the few primary network programs initiated by Mutual during this era rapidly became one of the most successful in its history—the first nationwide, all-night call-in talk radio program, which launched on November 3, 1975, with Herb Jepko as host. Jepko's show, which originated from KSL in Salt Lake City in 1964 as Nitecap, was fed by Mutual for eight hours beginning at midnight ET, allowing for stations on the West Coast to carry it live. Mutual also signed up 12 high-powered AM stations to ensure coast-to-coast reception. Jepko so determinedly avoided controversial topics on the program that some callers simply talked about the weather where they lived. Fellow broadcaster Hilly Rose said of Jepko, "he is the exact opposite of Joe Pyne and 99% of the successful talk show hosts in America. If (he) were any nicer, he would make Mary Poppins look like a witch."

In May 1977, Mutual dropped Jepko's show, replacing it with the husband-and-wife team of Long John Nebel and Candy Jones from WMCA in New York City, whose program fared little better than Jepko's. Nebel and Jones were gone by the end of the year and Mutual then hired a virtually unknown local talk show host at WIOD in Miami: Larry King. On January 30, 1978, the Larry King Show made its national debut on Mutual. Initially broadcast over 28 stations, by late 1979, King's increasingly popular all-night program was being carried by nearly 200 stations. With a nightly audience of around 2 million listeners, the Larry King Show continued to attract new affiliates to the network during the early 1980s. King, like Jepko, generally steered clear of contentious topics and gave regular callers to the program pseudonyms or nicknames.

Originally a five-and-a-half hour program, the last half hour was relaunched as America in The Morning, a morning news magazine hosted by WCFL alumnus Jim Bohannon, in September 1984. King continued with his Mutual call-in show until 1994, long after his move to television in 1985 as host of Larry King Live for CNN. King's success soon prompted the NBC and ABC radio networks to launch NBC Talknet and ABC TalkRadio, respectively, both featuring call-in shows broadcast during the late-evening and overnight hours. The Larry King Show also won a Peabody Award for Mutual in 1982.

Mutual made additional ventures beyond talk programming and newscasts during this time. Along with the network's existing sports coverage, Mutual was the national radio broadcaster for Monday Night Football from 1970 through 1977. Mutual began nationally distributing Jamboree USA from WWVA in Wheeling, West Virginia, on February 23, 1979, marking the first time in years that the network featured a regularly scheduled live music program. Jamboree USA also became the first music program on radio to be transmitted by satellite; the new technology now further enabled Mutual to offer additional music programming to affiliates, including anthologies and concerts.

=== 1980s–1990s: The end of Mutual ===
==== Acquisition by Westwood One ====
Ad for Dick Clark's National Music Survey, among the last entertainment shows to originate on Mutual

With their purchase of WCFL still pending, Amway acquired a second station for Mutual with New York City's WHN from Storer Broadcasting on February 26, 1979, for $14 million (equivalent to $62.1 million in 2025), at the time the second-highest purchase price for a radio station. Supplanting WMCA as Mutual's New York outlet, the deal closed on March 3, 1980. Re-branded "Mutual/CFL", WCFL was relaunched in August 1979 as the flagship for Mutual Lifestyle Radio, a form of talk radio oriented towards light conversation. On a Country Road, a country music show hosted by WHN's Lee Arnold, was given national distribution. Also in March 1980, Mutual picked up the Sears Radio Theater after being dropped by CBS Radio, renaming it Mutual Radio Theater. While a number of well-regarded episodes were produced, the last original episode of the series was broadcast on December 19, 1980, and was Mutual's final radio drama. The Mutual Southwest Network also closed at the end of 1980; in both cases, Mutual Radio Theater and Mutual Southwest suffered from a lack of advertising support.

In 1981, Mutual launched Dick Clark's National Music Survey, a three-hour-long weekly program combining music and interviews, a show Clark continued to host even after co-founding a competing syndicator, United Stations Radio Networks, earlier in the year. Sports commentaries were added, featuring the likes of Tommy Lasorda and Pat Summerall, along with hourly "Wide Weekend of Sports" sportscasts throughout the weekend; the network also held play-by-play rights to Notre Dame college football, the PGA Tour, the LPGA, the United States Tennis Association and regional rights for four NFL teams.

When I entered this business, everybody I'd meet wanted to talk to me about O&O's and I remember the first staff meeting I ever had at Mutual after we bought it, and I went in and I met everybody, and they said, "What about O&O's?" And I remember my answer was, "What's an O&O?" Well they all kind of laughed. Then they all told me that that was the way to go. We had to own a bunch of radio stations. Well, I didn't buy a network to think I had to buy a bunch of radio stations—I thought I'd already bought something.

— Richard DeVos

Mutual's satellite network was fully online by 1982, but the new technology allowed for additional networks to emerge, some—including efforts from NBC, ABC, CBS, RKO, Satellite Music Network and Transtar—providing continuous programming to radio stations on a "turnkey" basis. WCFL also failed to meet the network's expectations. Chuck Swirsky, hired as an evening sports talk host, later called WCFL "... the lowest rated 50-thousand watts station in American broadcast history. We had blank pages for logs. Zero commercial inventory. Any PSA content our traffic department received, we immediately played on the air that night." As Mutual celebrated its 50th anniversary, Amway denied rumors of a possible sale, but executive Richard DeVos admitted the company was disappointed with their venture into broadcasting, calling Mutual "a learning experience" and their stewardship of WCFL "not a very good one ... I began to question whether our people really knew how to run a radio station". Network president John Brian Clements asserted "this network is not for sale", but the radio stations were: WCFL was sold to Statewide Broadcasting in November 1983 at a $4 million loss and WHN was sold to Doubleday Broadcasting in October 1984 at a $1 million loss. Clements took over as president when Amway's board called for the resignation of several executives and followed downsizing due to "softening sales".

In 1985, Westwood One, a radio production company and syndicator based in Culver City, California, sought to expand its operations. Westwood and Mutual were a good match: the demographics of Mutual affiliates tended to be adult, while most of the stations that bought Westwood's music-oriented programming had substantially younger audiences. Mutual had news operations Westwood lacked, and although down from its peak, still commanded 860 affiliates and generated $25 million in revenue, a strong second among the Big Four. In September 1985, Amway sold the network to Westwood One for $39 million (equivalent to $117 million in 2025) outside of the satellite services division and uplink facility, which Amway retained. "It's a perfect fit," declared Westwood head Norman J. Pattiz. Referring to the united company's ability to give advertisers access to a broad demographic sweep, he called it "a classic case of two plus two equaling five." On July 20, 1987, the number got even bigger: Westwood One snapped up the NBC Radio Network for $50 million (equivalent to $142 million in 2025), pursuing Mutual's long-time competitor since a planned sale of the network and NBC's radio stations to Westinghouse Broadcasting fell through.

Mutual was now part of a much larger programming service, and its identity was being gradually phased out. In 1987, Mutual's longform fare, including Larry King and Toni Grant, were placed in a new service called "Mutual P.M.", which Westwood One touted as "clon(ing) a new network from the existing network" in hopes of attracting new advertisers. NBC Radio's news and engineering staff was combined with Mutual personnel at the Arlington facility in 1989, and by 1992, programming between the two networks began to undergo consolidation, particularly in overnights and weekends. King switched his all-night radio show to a shorter daytime version on February 1, 1993, with the late-night slot going to Jim Bohannon; in addition to hosting America in The Morning, Bohannon had been King's fill-in host since 1981 and later hosted his own weekend call-in program on Mutual with the same format as King's. Unfortunately, many of Mutual's affiliates declined to carry King's daytime show and he was unable to generate the same number of listeners. After sixteen years with Mutual, King resigned from the program, with his final broadcast on May 27, 1994.Mutual gave King's afternoon time slot to comedian David Brenner, whose show lasted for two years. Westwood One began simulcasting the television audio of King's nightly CNN talk show, Larry King Live, which continued through the end of 2009. Outside of Bohannon's show, most Mutual programming was now being heard on smaller market stations, with many affiliates using it as a "backup" to a different primary affiliation; by 1999, Mutual News was down to approximately 300 affiliates.

==== Consolidation, streamlining and dissolution ====
Meanwhile, Westwood One began to be subject to larger mergers and acquisitions. Westwood One purchased competing syndicator Unistar Radio Networks from Infinity Broadcasting in 1994; as part of the deal, Infinity purchased 25 percent of Westwood One, becoming its largest shareholder and effectively taking it over. Westinghouse, which recently bought out CBS and was renamed CBS Corporation shortly thereafter, then acquired Infinity in June 1996 for just shy of $5 billion (equivalent to $10.3 billion in 2025). The direct descendants of the three original U.S. radio network companies had merged, with Mutual little more than one of several brand names for programming under the aegis of Westwood One, itself under the control of a major conglomerate. Mutual and NBC Radio newscasters sat back to back in the Westwood One studio, the former main Mutual facility in Crystal City, Virginia, which now also fed CBS Radio News from New York City and CNN Radio feeds—which Westwood One also distributed—from Atlanta; despite newsroom signage still reading "Mutual Broadcasting System" as late as 1998, it was referred to internally as "the Westwood One newsroom". The newsroom itself closed on August 31, 1998, with Mutual and NBC newscasts originating from the CBS Radio News facilities.

"In this world of media brand names, there's so much synergy that's involved, and Mutual had to hang out there by itself. It was very hard to support it."

— Nick Kiernan, Westwood One vice president of affiliate relations, on the 1999 retirement of the "Mutual News" name

In early 1999, Westwood One announced that it would retire the Mutual name and end newscast production, with CNN Radio, CBS or Fox News Radio offered as replacements to affiliates. The majority of NBC Radio's remaining services would also cease outside of morning drive hours. In addition to producing NBC, CBS and Mutual newscasts and distributing CNN content, Westwood One also began distributing Fox News; as a result, the company was marketing five different newscast brands in what one company representative called "wasteful". A former staffer for Mutual's news service described the end of the network: "Official time of Mutual Radio's death was Midnight 4/17/99. No tribute, no mention it was the last newscast ... it just died." The closure of Mutual News resulted in 12 staffers being dismissed from CBS Radio News, which itself underwent a recent series of cutbacks involving on-air talent.

While the dropping of the Mutual name was attributed to mass consolidation, in particular following passage of the 1996 Telecommunications Act, Dick Rosse, a Mutual Broadcasting System correspondent for 36 years until his retirement in 1998, wrote the following for an op-ed in Broadcasting & Cable:

The Mutual Broadcasting System died (this week) and, aside from the folks who worked there, you'd have to go a long way to find anyone who was saddened, or even cared. Certainly, word of Mutual's demise was not a subject of discussion among the suits over lunch at "21" or the Four Seasons. Maybe out there, in the boonies (Mutual's natural habitat) some listener might sense that something had vanished from his radio universe. Old age killed Mutual. That, and increasing irrelevance in a world that associates "radio" with Rush, Howard and Doctor Laura. So when Jack Kevorkian (in the guise of CBS head Mel Karmazin) paid his call, Mutual didn't need much of a push.

The Crystal City facility was closed in March 2001, with Westwood One's primary operations transferred to the CBS Broadcast Center in New York City.

== Legacy ==
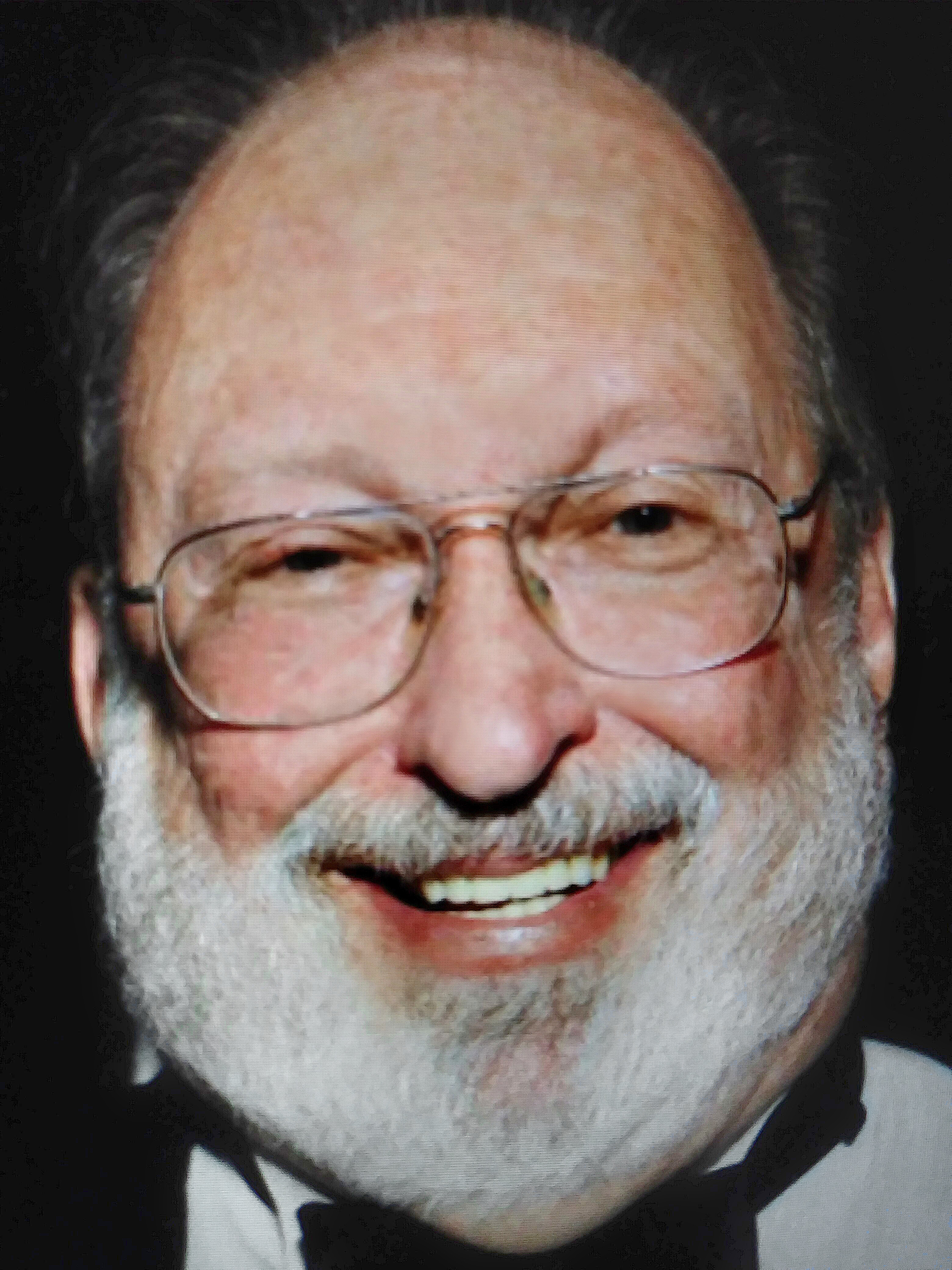
Jim Bohannon

Westwood One's corporate fate proved almost as complicated as the fate of Mutual itself. Spun off by majority owner CBS Corporation (one of two successors to the first Viacom, which acquired the first CBS Corporation in 1999) to The Gores Group in 2007, it was merged into Dial Global—a subsidiary of Oaktree Capital Management's Triton Media Group unit—in 2011, ultimately taking that company's name. Prior to its 2013 merger into Cumulus Media Networks, Dial Global reverted to using the Westwood One name. Even with all these changes, some current programming both on Westwood One (owned by Cumulus Media) and other syndicators can still trace their lineage directly to Mutual:

Jim Bohannon's interview/call-in show, which debuted on Mutual in 1985 (and was a direct descendant of Larry King and Herb Jepko's shows), continued until his abrupt retirement on October 14, 2022. Rich Valdés took over hosting duties for the program, which became Rich Valdés America at Night in January, 2023. Bohannon missed much of the summer of 2022 for what were initially unexplained reasons but was later revealed to be a diagnosis of terminal stage 4 esophageal cancer, and died 29 days after his final show. Bohannon also hosted the morning news magazine America in the Morning from its 1984 premiere over Mutual until 2015; America in the Morning continued for the next 11 years as a Westwood One program under Bohannon's successor as host, John Trout, before it was cancelled in September 2026.

Since 2004, the current incarnation of NBC's Meet the Press, first broadcast over Mutual in 1945, has had an audio simulcast over Westwood One. Country Countdown USA, founded in 1992 as a Mutual-branded program after the Westwood One purchase, continues to air in its original format but moved to Compass Media Networks in August 2022. Radio broadcasts of Notre Dame Fighting Irish football first broadcast over Mutual in 1956, were eventually re-branded as from Westwood One a few years before the end of the Mutual network itself. At the conclusion of the 2007 football season, Notre Dame ended its relationship with Westwood One, citing financial reasons, and subsequently announced a deal with ISP Sports.

After taking over Westwood One in 2013, Cumulus Media launched a white-label news service, Westwood One News under a content-sharing deal with CNN. Launching on January 1, 2015, as a replacement service among Cumulus's radio stations that previously affiliated with ABC News Radio, CBS News Radio and NBC News Radio (the latter having replaced CNN Radio in 2012), it ended operations on August 30, 2020.

Mutual founding stations WOR and WLW are now both owned by iHeartMedia, which operates their own syndication unit, Premiere Networks. Prior to being purchased by iHeartMedia in 2012 (as Clear Channel Communications), WOR operated a syndication service of their own, the WOR Radio Network. The other founding station, WGN, is owned by television broadcaster Nexstar Media Group as the lone radio station in their portfolio. WGN previously syndicated Orion Samuelson farm reports through its Tribune Radio Network, which carried Chicago Cubs broadcasts until the 2014 season.

== Awards and honors ==
The Mutual Broadcasting System has been the recipient of the following Peabody Awards:

- 1941 Peabody Award: Outstanding Achievement in Music—Alfred Wallenstein (co-honored with WOR)
- 1944 Peabody Award: Outstanding Educational Program—Human Adventure
- 1946 Peabody Award Honorable Mention: Meet the Press
- 1950 Peabody Award Honorable Mention: Contribution to International Understanding—Pursuit of Peace (co-honored with United Nations Radio)
- 1956 Peabody Award: The Bob and Ray Show (co-honored with NBC)
- 1982 Peabody Award: The Larry King Show
- 1987 Peabody Award: Charities That Give and Take

== See also ==
=== Notable programs ===
Shows heard over the Mutual Broadcasting System during the "Golden Age of Radio" included the following: (Note: Run dates on Mutual are per Dunning (1998), checked against Lackmann (2000). Note that Dunning does not list The Sea Hound as ever running on Mutual, but Lackmann does. Neither lists Skyroads.)

- Abbott Mysteries, 1945–1947
- Adventure Parade, 1946–1949
- The Adventures of Champion, 1949
- The Adventures of Father Brown, 1945
- The Adventures of Maisie, 1952
- The Adventures of Superman, 1942–1949
- The Amazing Nero Wolfe, 1945
- A. L. Alexander's Mediation Board, 1943–1952
- Archie Andrews, 1944
- Arch Oboler's Plays, 1945
- The Black Museum, 1952
- Blackstone, the Magic Detective, 1948–1949
- Captain Midnight, 1940–1942; 1945–1949; 1949
- Charlie Chan, 1935–1945 (original series); 1947–1948 (reruns)
- Chick Carter, Boy Detective, 1943–1945
- The Cisco Kid, 1942–1945; 1946 (regional)
- The Couple Next Door, 1937
- The Crime Club, 1946–1947
- Crime Does Not Pay, 1952
- Dick Tracy, 1935–1937
- Family Theater, 1947–1957
- Hopalong Cassidy, 1950
- Hop Harrigan, 1946–1948
- I Love a Mystery, 1949–1952
- It Pays to Be Ignorant, 1942; 1943–1944
- Johnny Modero, Pier 23, 1947
- Land of the Lost, 1945–1946
- Mandrake the Magician, 1940–1942
- Mark Trail, 1950–1951
- Martin Kane, Private Eye, 1949–1951
- Red Ryder, 1942; 1942–1949 (regional)
- Queen for a Day, 1945–1947
- The Saint, 1949–1950
- The Lone Ranger, 1933–1954
- The Sea Hound, 1946–1947
- The Sealed Book, 1945
- The Shadow, 1937–1954
- Sky King, 1950–1954
- Skyroads, 1939
- The Two Ton Baker Show, 1948–1949
- Vic and Sade, 1946
- Voyage of the Scarlet Queen, 1947–1948
- The Zane Grey Show, 1947–1948

=== Notable staff ===
- Jim Bohannon, talk show host
- Tom Cheek, sportscaster
- Raymond Clapper, commentator
- Bud Collyer, actor
- Chuck Connors, actor
- Dizzy Dean, sportscaster
- Gene Elston, sportscaster
- Bob Feller, sportscaster
- Tex Fletcher, singing cowboy
- Eli Gold, sportscaster
- Morton Gould, conductor/arranger/pianist
- Toni Grant, talk-show host
- Ray Heatherton, musical actor
- Gabriel Heatter, commentator
- Skitch Henderson, conductor/arranger/pianist
- Ernest Holmes, religion-show host
- Quincy Howe, commentator
- Wilbur Budd Hulick, comic actor
- Herb Jepko, talk show host
- Candy Jones, talk show host
- Larry King, talk show host
- Fredell Lack, violinist
- Fulton Lewis, commentator
- Fulton Lewis III, commentator
- Tony Marvin, newscaster
- Long John Nebel, talk show host
- Lindsey Nelson, sportscaster
- Van Patrick, sportscaster
- Drew Pearson, commentator
- Robert Ripley, show host
- Ed Salamon, programming executive
- Cesare Sodero, conductor
- Bill Stern, sportscaster
- Raymond Gram Swing, commentator
- Aloysius Michael Sullivan, announcer
- Phil Tonken, announcer
- Westbrook Van Voorhis, newscaster
- Al Wester, sportscaster

== Bibliography ==
- Alexander, Charles C. (2002). Breaking the Slump: Baseball in the Depression Era. New York: Columbia University Press. ISBN 0-231-11342-0.
- Bareiss, Warren; Leigh, Frederic A. (1998). "Sustaining Programs". In Godfrey, Donald G. (ed.). Historical Dictionary of American Radio. Westport, Conn., and London: Greenwood Press. ISBN 0-313-29636-7.
- Bliss, Edward (1991). Now the News: The Story of Broadcast Journalism. New York: Columbia University Press. ISBN 0-231-04402-X.
- Brady, Frank (1990) [1989]. Citizen Welles: A Biography of Orson Welles. New York: Anchor. ISBN 0-385-26759-2.
- Brown, Robert J. (1998). Manipulating the Ether: The Power of Broadcast Radio in Thirties America. Jefferson, N.C., and London: McFarland. ISBN 0-7864-2066-9.
- Callow, Simon (1995). Orson Welles: Vol. 1—The Road to Xanadu. New York: Viking. ISBN 0-14-025456-0.
- Cassidy, Marsha Francis (2005). What Women Watched: Daytime Television in the 1950s. Austin: University of Texas Press. ISBN 0-292-70627-8.
- Clarke, Donald (1996). The Rise and Fall of Popular Music. New York: St. Martin's. ISBN 0-312-14200-5.
- Cox, Jim (2015) [2002]. Say Goodnight, Gracie: The Last Years of Network Radio. Jefferson, N.C.: McFarland. ISBN 978-0-7864-1168-9.
- Cox, Jim (2002). American Radio Networks: A History. Jefferson, N.C.: McFarland. ISBN 0-7864-4192-5. Archived from the original on February 10, 2023.
- Crane, Marie Brenne (1980). "Radio Station KGB and the Development of Commercial Radio in San Diego". Journal of San Diego History. 26 (1 - winter). ISSN 0022-4383. Archived from the original on October 5, 2006.
- Crook, Tim (1998). International Radio Journalism: History, Theory and Practice. London and New York: Routledge. ISBN 0-415-09672-3.
- Day, Frederick J. (2004). Clubhouse Lawyer: Law in the World of Sports. Lincoln, Neb.: iUniverse. ISBN 0-595-31850-9.
- Doherty, Thomas (2003). Cold War, Cool Medium: Television, McCarthyism, and American Culture. New York: Columbia University Press. ISBN 0-231-12952-1.
- Dunning, John (1998). On the Air: The Encyclopedia of Old-Time Radio. New York and Oxford: Oxford University Press. ISBN 0-19-507678-8.
- Garay, Ronald (1992). Gordon McLendon: The Maverick of Radio. New York, Westport, Conn., and London: Greenwood Press. ISBN 0-313-26676-X.
- Gorman, Jerry; Calhoun, Kirk; Rozin, Skip (1994). The Name of the Game: The Business of Sports. New York et al.: John Wiley & Sons. ISBN 0-471-59423-7.
- Harmon, Jim (2011). Radio Mystery and Adventure and Its Appearances in Film, Television and Other Media. McFarland & Co. ISBN 978-0-7864-8508-6. Archived from the original on February 16, 2023.
- Head, Sydney W. (1976). Broadcasting in America: Survey of Television and Radio. New York: Houghton Mifflin. ISBN 0-395-20644-8.
- Hilmes, Michelle (1997). Radio Voices: American Broadcasting, 1922–1952. Minneapolis and London: University of Minnesota Press. ISBN 0-8166-2621-9.
- Hollis, Tim (2001). Hi There, Boys and Girls!: America's Local Children's TV Programs. Jackson: University Press of Mississippi. ISBN 1-57806-396-5.
- Howard, Herbert H. (1979). Multiple Ownership in Television Broadcasting: Historical Development and Selected Case Studies. New York: Arno Press. ISBN 0-405-11759-0.
- Jaker, Bill; Sulek, Frank; Kanze, Peter (1998). The Airwaves of New York: Illustrated Histories of 156 AM Stations in the Metropolitan Area. Jefferson, N.C.: McFarland. ISBN 0-7864-0343-8.
- Kirkley Jr., Donald H. (1979) [1967]. A Descriptive Study of the Network Television Western During the Seasons 1955–56—1962–63. New York: Arno Press. ISBN 0-405-11761-2.
- Lackmann, Ron (2000). The Encyclopedia of American Radio: An A–Z Guide to Radio from Jack Benny to Howard Stern. New York: Facts on File/Checkmark. ISBN 0-8160-4077-X.
- Leblebici, Huseyin; Salancik, Gerald R.; Copay, Anne; King, Tom (September 1991). "Institutional change and the transformation of interorganizational fields: an organizational history of the U.S. radio broadcasting industry - includes appendices". Administrative Science Quarterly. 36 (3). Archived from the original on February 20, 2008 – via FindArticles.
- Lucier, James P. (February 9, 1998). "Jim Bohannon On Air—Radio Talk Show Host". Insight on the News. 14 (5): 15. ISSN 1051-4880. Archived from the original on February 12, 2023 – via Gale Academic Onefile.
- Marshall, William J. (1998). Baseball's Pivotal Era, 1945–1951. Lexington: University Press of Kentucky. ISBN 0-8131-2041-1.
- McDougal, Dennis (2001) [1998]. The Last Mogul: Lew Wasserman, MCA, and the Hidden History of Hollywood. New York: Da Capo. ISBN 0-306-81050-6.
- Nachmann, Gerald (2000). Raised on Radio. Berkeley, Los Angeles, and London: University of California Press. ISBN 0-520-22303-9.
- Nimmo, Dan D. & Newsome, Chevelle (1997). Political Commentators in the United States in the 20th Century: A Bio-Critical Sourcebook. Westport, Conn.: Greenwood. ISBN 0-313-29585-9.
- The 1973 World Book Year Book: The Annual Supplement to the World Book Encyclopedia. Chicago: Field Enterprises Educational Corp. 1973. ISBN 0-7166-0473-6.
- Olson, James Stuart (2000). Historical Dictionary of the 1950s. Westport, Conn., and London: Greenwood. ISBN 0-313-30619-2.
- Patterson, Ted (2004). The Golden Voices of Football. Champaign, Ill.: Sports Publishing. ISBN 1-58261-744-9.
- Robinson, Thomas Porter (1979) [1943]. Radio Networks and the Federal Government. New York: Arno Press. ISBN 0-405-11772-8.
- Rose, Cornelia B. Jr. (1971). National Policy for Radio Broadcasting. New York: Arno Press/New York Times. ISBN 0-405-03580-2.
- Rose, Hilly (1978). But That's Not What I Called About. Chicago: Contemporary Books, Inc. ISBN 0-8092-7624-0. LCCN 77-91174.
- Savage, Barbara Dianne (1999). Broadcasting Freedom: Radio, War, and the Politics of Race, 1938–1948. Chapel Hill, N.C.: University of North Carolina Press. ISBN 0-8078-4804-2.
- Schramm, Wilbur (1969). Mass Communications: A Book of Readings. Urbana and Chicago: University of Illinois Press. ISBN 0-252-00015-3.
- Schwoch, James (1994). "A Failed Vision: The Mutual Television Network". Velvet Light Trap. 33 (spring). ISSN 1542-4251. Archived from the original on September 30, 2007.
- Segrave, Kerry (1999). Movies at Home: How Hollywood Came to Television. Jefferson, N.C.: McFarland. ISBN 0-7864-0654-2.
- Smith, F. Leslie; Wright II, John W.; Ostroff, David H. (1998). Perspectives on Radio and Television: Telecommunication in the United States. Mahwah, N.J.: Lawrence Erlbaum. ISBN 0-8058-2092-2.
- Thompson, Julius Eric (1993). The Black Press in Mississippi, 1865–1985. Gainesville: University Press of Florida. ISBN 0-8130-1174-4.
- Ward, Richard Lewis (2005). A History of the Hal Roach Studios. Carbondale: Southern Illinois University Press. ISBN 0-8093-2727-9.
- Whitaker, Jerry C. (2002). Audio/Video Protocol Handbook: Broadcast Standards and Reference Data. New York et al.: McGraw-Hill. ISBN 0-07-139643-8. Archived from the original on February 27, 2011.
