= The Sea Hound =

American radio adventure series 1942–1951

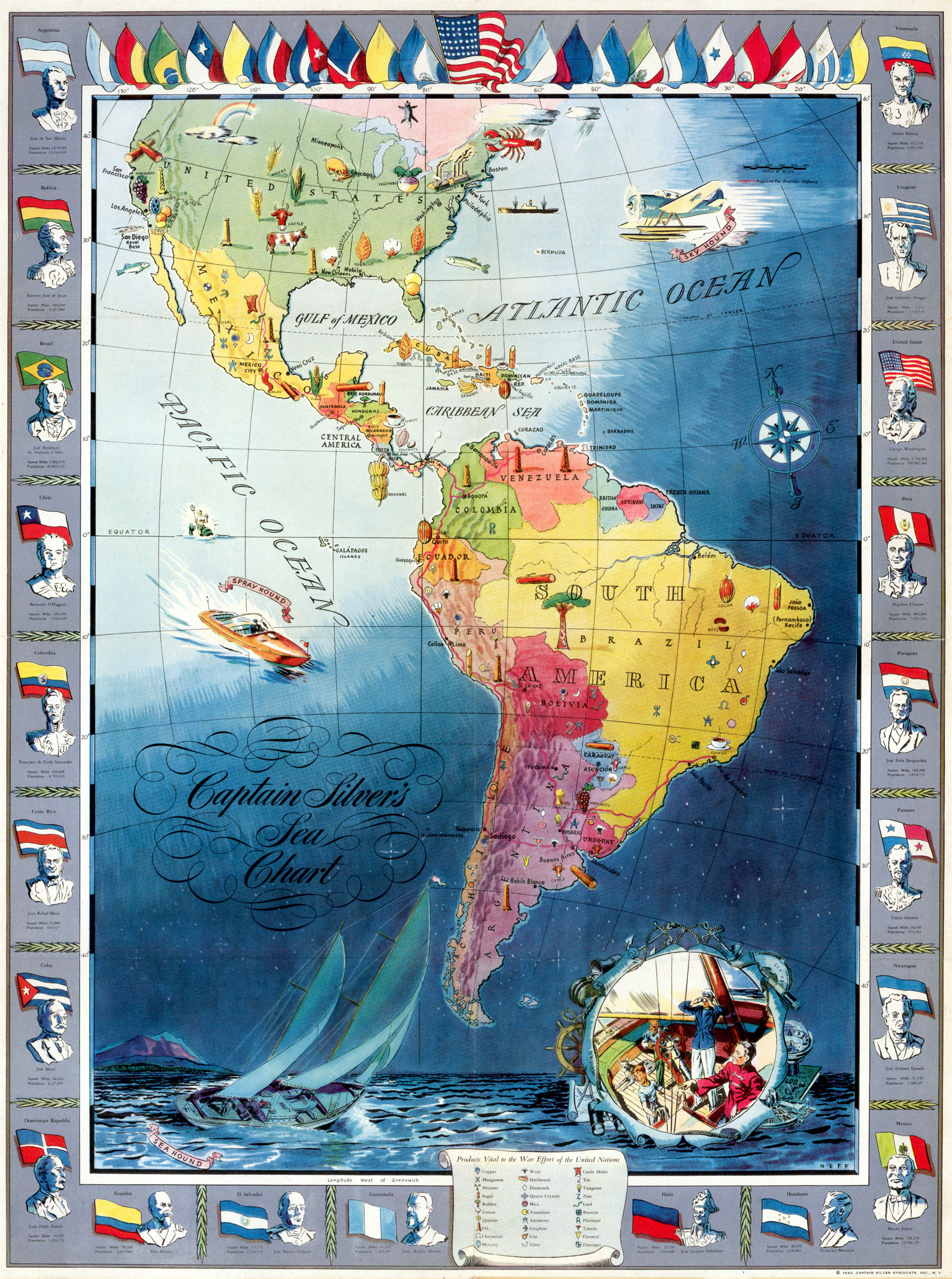
Captain Silver's Sea Chart (1942)

The Sea Hound is an American radio adventure series that ran from June 29, 1942, to August 7, 1951. It began on the Blue Network June 29, 1942 – September 22, 1944, as a 15-minute serial for young audiences, featuring Ken Daigneau as Captain Silver of the ship The Sea Hound. Other members of the cast were Barry Thompson as Captain Silver, Bob Hastings as Jerry, and Alan Devitt as Kai. Doug Browning was the announcer.

In 1946–47 it aired on the Mutual Broadcasting System. The program expanded to 30 minutes on ABC radio June 21–September 2, 1948, alternating with Sky King. It last aired June 26–August 7, 1951, on ABC.

Between 1942 and 1944, The Sea Hound was produced with Nelson A. Rockefeller's Office of the Coordinator of Inter-American Affairs and was part of a national program to strengthen inter-American relations. Broadcast five times a week, the serial related the adventures of Captain Silver and his sidekick Jerry as they pursued Nazi agents throughout the Western hemisphere. Every episode took place in a different Latin American country. To educate young listeners about each country's geography and strategic importance, the producers created Captain Silver's Sea Chart, a map that identified the vital products, flags and national heroes of each Latin American republic. Some 200,000 complimentary copies of Captain Silver's Sea Chart were distributed.

== Episodes ==
Episodes of The Sea Hound include the following:

- The Envelope
- Trapped Below
- In Ekekay-Chasing Phantom Ship
- After Captain Boom Boom
- Mystery Cargo-Looking for Wald
- Phantom Raider-Escape
- The Traitor
- The Capture
- The Escape
- Hut of the Voodoo Queen
- Magic Idol-God of Vengeance

== Other media ==
The show spawned a short-lived comic book, and the 1947 Columbia Pictures serial, The Sea Hound, starring Buster Crabbe.
