= Fulton Lewis Jr. =

American radio broadcaster (1903–1966)

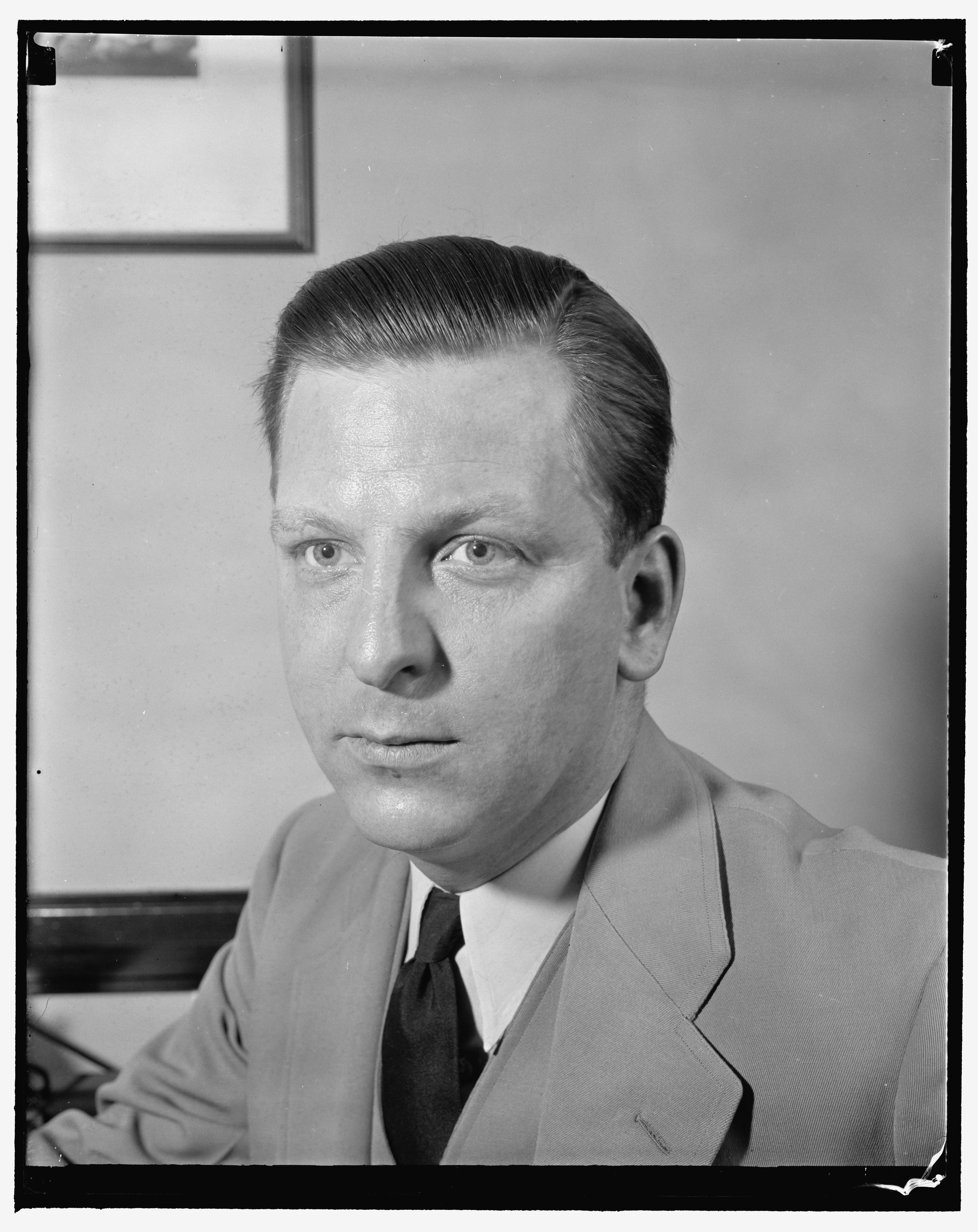
- Lewis in 1939
- Born: Fulton R. Lewis Jr. April 30, 1903; Washington, D.C., U.S.
- Died: August 20, 1966 (aged 63); Washington, D.C., U.S.
- Resting place: Rock Creek Cemetery, Washington, D.C., U.S.
- Education: University of Virginia; George Washington University Law School
- Occupation: Radio broadcaster
- Awards: Alfred I. duPont Award (1942)

Fulton Lewis Jr. (April 30, 1903 – August 20, 1966) was a conservative American radio broadcaster from the 1930s to the 1960s.

== Early life and career ==
Lewis was born into influential circles in the nation's capital. He remained close to the circles of power all his life (President Herbert Hoover and his wife attended the wedding of Lewis to Alice Huston, who was the daughter of former Republican National Committee chairman Claudius Hart Huston)

An indifferent student, Lewis attended the University of Virginia for three years (where he was a member of the Virginia Glee Club and wrote the music for that school's official fight song, The Cavalier Song). He dropped out of UVa, but soon after enrolled in the George Washington University Law School. He left that institution when he obtained a reporting job with The Washington Herald. He found his niche in news reporting, and within three years was the paper's city editor. During that time he met and courted his future wife.

== Radio career ==
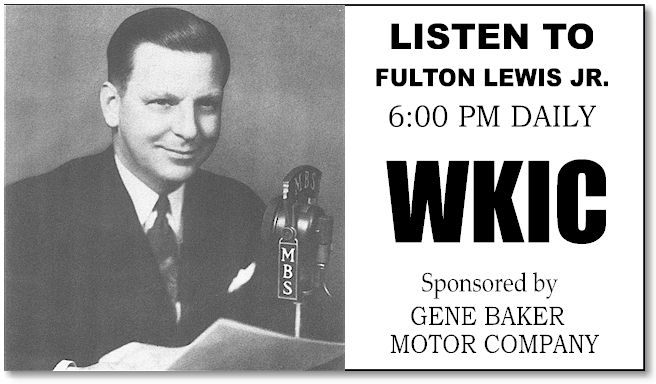
Advertisement for Fulton Lewis Jr.'s radio show on WKIC in Hazard, Kentucky.

Lewis left the Herald to join Universal News Service, run by the Hearst family. Between 1933 and 1936 Lewis wrote a newspaper column called "The Washington Sideshow" which was syndicated by King Features. His radio career began when he volunteered to fill in for a vacationing news reporter. The head of Washington AM radio station WOL (1260 AM) was impressed with Lewis' "on-the-spot" reporting and offered him a full-time position. His commentaries were broadcast nationally by the Mutual Broadcasting System.

Lewis' commentary program (presented as a "news" program, but which allowed him to choose his topic and to give his opinions in depth) ran from 7:00-7:15 p.m. Eastern time, five days a week. His audience liked Lewis' folksy broadcasting style. At his commercial peak, Lewis was heard on more than 500 radio stations and boasted a weekly audience of sixteen million listeners. His signature closing was "That's the top of the news as it looks from here." He also transitioned briefly to television in the early 1950s but the format of his program did not appeal in that medium, so he returned to radio for the remainder of his career.

Lewis was a conservative commentator who supported Barry Goldwater for President, supported limited government and federalism, and opposed liberal leaders such as John F. Kennedy and Lyndon B. Johnson and their policies. He first made his mark by opposing the New Deal policies of Franklin Delano Roosevelt (although he initially admired the man upon his first election), and as the world lurched toward World War II in the late 1930s he strongly supported the America First Committee, along with famed aviator Charles Lindbergh in their efforts to keep the US out of what he considered "the European War". He strongly opposed FDR's re-election in 1944, and also the election campaign of FDR's successor Harry S. Truman in 1948.

After the war, Lewis was avidly anti-communist, and strongly backed Senator Joe McCarthy. He was one of the first broadcasters to expose Julius and Ethel Rosenberg as the communist spies that the Venona papers proved they were, although he was later accused of antisemitism as well. He despised Earl Warren, even, at one point, calling to lynch him: "I wouldn't impeach him. I'd lynch him." Even after McCarthy was disgraced nationwide, Lewis continued to strongly champion him, and this did much to reduce his nationwide radio audience and appeal. He continued on air, however, until his death in 1966, after which his son Fulton Lewis III kept the broadcast running for another twelve years.

== Legacy ==
Lewis was influential in persuading the U.S. Congress to allow radio broadcasting of Congressional activities.

Among those who worked for Lewis was Kenneth Tomlinson, future head of the Corporation for Public Broadcasting (CPB). In this position, Tomlinson worked to eliminate what he calls liberal bias at the Public Broadcasting Service and National Public Radio. One of CPB's ombudsmen, Bill Schulz, was a writer for Lewis and for Human Events. Schulz and Tomlinson were also colleagues at Reader's Digest.

Lewis wrote the words for "The Cavalier Song" for the University of Virginia while a student there. The song was featured in the 2000 movie Bring It On.

In 1942 Lewis was the first recipient of the Alfred I. duPont Award.

Lewis's name is remembered in the Hollywood Walk of Fame, in a star placed on the South side of the 6200 block of Hollywood Boulevard.

Lewis is buried in Rock Creek Cemetery in Washington, D.C. Fellow radio personality Paul Harvey broadcast a eulogy on August 22, 1966 saying "Fulton Lewis, Jr. believed in government by the people. He prodded us and cajoled us and spurred us and nagged us and shamed us when he had to, into acceptance of the responsibilities of self-government . . . hanging onto what’s left of the Constitution with one hand and fighting off its detractors with the other, he would not let us fail. If men are competent to govern themselves then, in the end, our republic will prevail. And tomorrow’s historians from that pinnacle looking back will thank God that he was on our side."

A 1987 editorial in The Washington Post referred to Lewis as " . . one of the most unprincipled journalists ever to practice the trade."

A 2005 Salon.com article stated, "A prominent radio broadcaster in the '40s, '50s and '60s, Lewis was known for his complete lack of objectivity."
