= Fulton Lewis III =

American journalist

Fulton Lewis III (January 25, 1936 – September 6, 2017) was an American journalist, the only son of the late network American news commentator Fulton Lewis Jr. and Alice Huston Lewis.

== Education and early career ==
Fulton Lewis III attended Landon School in Bethesda, Maryland and the University of Virginia, graduating from the latter in 1957. His first job was News Director of a small station in Jamestown, New York but soon afterwards (1959) he was hired by the House Un-American Activities Committee of the U.S. Congress as its Research Director. The following year, he produced and narrated the committee's documentary film of the May 1960 riots in San Francisco protesting the committee's hearings there, Operation: Abolition. The script was written by FBI Director J. Edgar Hoover and showed evidence of involvement by members of the Communist Party USA in the incitement and leadership of the riots. In 1961, Lewis resigned from the committee to embark on a nationwide lecture/debate tour in defense of the validity of the film. He appeared on over 750 college and university campuses.

In 1963, Lewis was named National Field Director of Young Americans for Freedom, a conservative youth group inspired by publisher William F. Buckley Jr. He continued his lecturing and debating as a means of organizing YAF chapters on campuses and to recruit support for the presidential candidacy of Sen. Barry Goldwater (R-AZ). Lewis was later hired as a speechwriter for Goldwater and his running mate Rep. William E. Miller (R-NY) in their unsuccessful campaign of 1964. Following the election, he continued his lecture tour appearing on hundreds of campuses and at civic, business and political meetings.

After the death of his father on August 20, 1966, Lewis was asked by the Mutual Broadcasting System to continue the elder Lewis' nightly 15-minute broadcasts, which he did until 1979. His commentaries were heard on over 500 of the network's affiliates by an estimated 16 million people.

== War correspondent ==
Lewis frequently traveled abroad as a war correspondent. Among other conflicts, he covered the 1967 Six-Day War in Israel, the war in Vietnam (six trips), the conflict in Northern Ireland, and the Biafran war for independence from Nigeria.

== Rhodesian boycott ==
Lewis also travelled to Rhodesia to cover that country's efforts to survive a United Nations economic boycott. Lewis' interviews with Rhodesian Prime Minister Ian Smith in the late 1960s are widely credited with bringing that issue to public attention in the U.S. Lewis argued that the boycott was instigated because Rhodesia had not perfected a "one-man, one-vote" system of government. However, as a result of the boycott the U.S. could no longer purchase metallurgical-grade chromium ore (a mineral needed for national defense) from Rhodesia, and was forced to import it from the Soviet Union—which, Lewis pointed out, had perfected a "no-man, no vote" system. Lewis was the author of legislation introduced by Sen. Harry F. Byrd Jr. (D-VA) in 1971 which provided that, in the event the U.S. was importing any strategically essential material from a communist source, there would be no prohibition against the importation of that same material from a non-communist source. After heated debate in the House and Senate, the measure - Section 503 of the Military Procurement Authorization Act of 1971 - was approved and, on November 7, 1971, signed into law by President Richard Nixon.

== Later career ==
In 1980, Lewis retired from journalism and moved to Florida, where he owned and operated a computer database services company. He continued to lecture throughout the nation, served as a consultant to numerous political candidates, and was a frequent contributor of articles to conservative journals.

== Awards and recognition ==
In July 2007, Lewis was a featured speaker at the national conventions of the College Republican National Federation and the TeenAge Republicans. In February, 2008, Lewis was named "Broadcasting Pioneer of the Year 2008" by the Broadcasters Club and the Florida Association of Broadcasters.

== Death ==
Fulton Lewis III died on September 6, 2017, in Sarasota, Florida of heart and lung disease.
