= Mutual Spanish Network =

American radio network

Mutual Spanish Network Mutual Cadena Hispánica
- Type: Spanish-language radio network
- Country: United States

Ownership
- Owner: Mutual Broadcasting System

History
- Launch date: May 1, 1972
- Closed: late 1972 or 1973

Coverage
- Affiliates: 17 (May 1972); 21 (July 1972)

The Mutual Spanish Network (MSN; known in Spanish as Mutual Cadena Hispánica or MCH) was a short-lived radio network spun off of the Mutual Broadcasting System in 1972.

== Creation ==
In the spring of 1972, Mutual Broadcasting System ("Mutual") president C. Edward Little announced the creation of two new networks designed to target minority audiences: the Mutual Black Network (MBN) and the Mutual Spanish Network (MSN), or Mutual Cadena Hispánica (MCH). Both services signed on May 1, 1972; MBN had 32 affiliates, while MSN/MCH began with 17 affiliates, mostly in the southwestern United States. Miguel Bomar was hired as news director for MSN/MCH, which aired 16 newscasts every day at :45 minutes past the hour between 7:45 a.m. and 11:45 p.m. eastern time. Two sportscasts were fed weekdays, three on Saturday and Sunday. One advertisement for the new network (headlined "A Spanish News Network? Si!") stated, "Now, for the first time, advertisers can reach the U.S. Spanish market on a national basis with network radio...one order, one billing covers outstanding Spanish radio stations in all the important U.S. markets."

== Problems and closure ==
From the start, advertiser support was lacking for MSN/MCH: it wasn't until August that the network signed its first sponsor, when Sterling Drug bought 15 commercials on an alternate-week basis for Bayer Aspirin. One problem was a lack of commonality among the then-eleven million Americans who spoke Spanish. Instead of one audience united by an ethnic background, Mutual found three distinctly different groups of Spanish-speaking Americans: those of Puerto Rican descent on the east coast; Cuban-Americans in the southeast; and those of Mexican descent in the southwest and on the west coast. And with each group using a different dialect, the network's newscasts were unintelligible to a large portion of the audience.

Ultimately, MSN/MCH didn't have enough advertisers to keep it going, and the network signed off after about six months.
