= List of feature film series with ten entries =

This is a list of film series that have ten entries.

Key:

- (A) – Film series is 100% animated
- (a) – Film series is not 100% animated and has live action in a sequel or prequel
- (TV) – made-for-TV
- (V) – direct-to-video
- (*) – TV series attached

== A ==
- Avengers (a) *****
  1. Ultimate Avengers (2006) (А) (V)
  2. Ultimate Avengers 2: Rise of the Panther (2006) (А) (V)
  3. Next Avengers: Heroes of Tomorrow (2008) (А) (V)
  4. The Avengers (2012)
  5. Avengers Confidential: Black Widow & Punisher (2014) (А) (V)
  6. Avengers: Age of Ultron (2015)
  7. Avengers: Infinity War (2018)
  8. Avengers: Endgame (2019)
  9. Avengers: Doomsday (2026)
  10. Avengers: Secret Wars (2027)
- Adams Apples (Ghana)
  1. Adams Apples: The Family Ties (2011)
  2. Adams Apples: Twisted Connections (2011)
  3. Adams Apples: Musical Chairs (2011)
  4. Adams Apples: Torn (2011)
  5. Adams Apples: Duplicity (2011)
  6. Adams Apples: Showdown (2011)
  7. Adams Apples: Confessions (2011)
  8. Adams Apples: Fight or Flight (2012)
  9. Adams Apples: Rescue Mission (2012)
  10. Adams Apples: New Beginnings (2012)

== B ==
- Black Emanuelle
  1. Emanuelle nera (1975)
  2. Emanuelle nera nº 2 (1976) (unofficial)
  3. Emanuelle nera orient reportage (1976)
  4. Emanuelle in America (1977)
  5. Emanuelle – Perche Violenza alle Donne? (1977)
  6. Sister Emanuelle (1977)
  7. Emanuelle e gli ultimi cannibali (1977)
  8. La Via della prostituzione (1978)
  9. Violenza in un carcere femminile (1982)
  10. Emanuelle fuga dall'inferno (1983)

== C ==
- The Conjuring Universe
  1. The Conjuring (2013)
  2. Annabelle (2014) (spin-off)
  3. The Conjuring 2 (2016)
  4. Annabelle: Creation (2017) (spin-off)
  5. The Nun (2018) (spin-off)
  6. Annabelle Comes Home (2019) (spin-off)
  7. The Conjuring: The Devil Made Me Do It (2021)
  8. The Nun II (2023) (spin-off)
  9. The Conjuring: Last Rites (2025)
  10. The Conjuring: First Communion (2027)
- Corporal Rod Webb
  1. Trail of the Yukon (1949)
  2. The Wolf Hunters (1949)
  3. Snow Dog (1950)
  4. Call of the Klondike (1950)
  5. Northwest Territory (1951)
  6. Yukon Manhunt (1951)
  7. Yukon Gold (1952)
  8. Fangs of the Arctic (1953)
  9. Northern Patrol (1953)
  10. Yukon Vengeance (1954)
- Crime Doctor
  1. Crime Doctor (1943)
  2. Crime Doctor's Strangest Case (1943)
  3. Shadows in the Night (1944)
  4. Crime Doctor's Warning (1945)
  5. The Crime Doctor's Courage (1945)
  6. Just Before Dawn (1946)
  7. Crime Doctor's Man Hunt (1946)
  8. The Millerson Case (1947)
  9. Crime Doctor's Gamble (1947)
  10. The Crime Doctor's Diary (1949)

== D ==
- Dekalog (TV)
  1. Dekalog: One (1989) (TV)
  2. Dekalog: Two (1989) (TV)
  3. Dekalog: Three (1989) (TV)
  4. Dekalog: Four (1989) (TV)
  5. Dekalog: Five (1989) (TV)
  6. Dekalog: Six (1989) (TV)
  7. Dekalog: Seven (1989) (TV)
  8. Dekalog: Eight (1989) (TV)
  9. Dekalog: Nine (1989) (TV)
  10. Dekalog: Ten (1989) (TV)

== E ==
- Eberhoferkrimi
  1. Dampfnudelblues (2013)
  2. Winterkartoffelknödel (2014)
  3. Schweinskopf al dente (2016)
  4. Grießnockerlaffäre (2017)
  5. Sauerkrautkoma (2018)
  6. Leberkäsjunkie (2019)
  7. Kaiserschmarrndrama (2021)
  8. Guglhupfgeschwader (2022)
  9. Rehragout-Rendezvous (2023)
  10. Steckerlfischfiasko (2026)
- Ellery Queen **
  1. The Spanish Cape Mystery (1935)
  2. The Mandarin Mystery (1936)
  3. Ellery Queen, Master Detective (1940)
  4. Ellery Queen's Penthouse Mystery (1941)
  5. Ellery Queen and the Perfect Crime (1941)
  6. Ellery Queen and the Murder Ring (1941)
  7. A Close Call for Ellery Queen (1942)
  8. A Desperate Chance for Ellery Queen (1942)
  9. Enemy Agents Meet Ellery Queen (1942)
  10. Ellery Queen: Don't Look Behind You (1971) (TV)
- Enteng Kabisote *
  1. Okay Ka, Fairy Ko!: The Movie (1991)
  2. Okay Ka, Fairy Ko!: Part 2 (1992)
  3. Enteng Kabisote: Okay Ka, Fairy Ko: The Legend (2004)
  4. Enteng Kabisote 2: Okay Ka Fairy Ko: The Legend Continues (2005)
  5. Enteng Kabisote 3: Okay Ka, Fairy Ko: The Legend Goes On and On and On (2006)
  6. Enteng Kabisote 4: Okay Ka, Fairy Ko: The Beginning of the Legend (2007)
  7. Si Agimat at si Enteng Kabisote (2010)
  8. Enteng ng Ina Mo (2011)
  9. Si Agimat, si Enteng Kabisote at si Ako (2012)
  10. Enteng Kabisote 10 and the Abangers (2016)

== F ==
- Fantozzi
  1. Fantozzi (1975)
  2. Il secondo tragico Fantozzi (1976)
  3. Fantozzi contro tutti (1980)
  4. Fantozzi subisce ancora (1983)
  5. Superfantozzi (1986)
  6. Fantozzi va in pensione (1988)
  7. Fantozzi alla riscossa (1990)
  8. Fantozzi in paradiso (1993)
  9. Fantozzi - Il ritorno (1996)
  10. Fantozzi 2000 - La clonazione (1999)
- Foolish Years
  1. Lude godine (Wacky Years), 1977)
  2. Došlo doba da se ljubav proba (The Time has Come to Taste the Love) a.k.a. Lude godine II (Wacky Years II, 1980)
  3. Ljubi, ljubi, al' glavu ne gubi (Kiss, Kiss, but Don't Lose Your Head, 1981)
  4. Kakav deda takav unuk (Like Grandpa, Like Grandson, 1983)
  5. Idi mi, dođi mi (Come to me and Go from me, 1983)
  6. Šta se zgodi kad se ljubav rodi (What Happens When Love Comes to Town, 1984)
  7. Žikina dinastija (Žika's Dynasty, 1985)
  8. Druga Žikina dinastija (Second Žika's Dynasty, 1986)
  9. Sulude godine (Weird Years, 1988)
  10. Žikina ženidba (Žika's Wedding, 1992), also known as Ženidba Žike Pavlovića (The Wedding of Žika Pavlović) in Croatia

== H ==
- Hanna-Barbera Superstars 10 (A) ******
  1. Yogi's Great Escape (1987) (TV)
  2. Scooby-Doo Meets the Boo Brothers (1987) (TV)
  3. The Jetsons Meet the Flintstones (1987) (TV)
  4. Yogi Bear and the Magical Flight of the Spruce Goose (1987) (TV)
  5. Top Cat and the Beverly Hills Cats (1988) (TV)
  6. The Good, the Bad, and Huckleberry Hound (1988) (TV)
  7. Rockin' with Judy Jetson (1988) (TV)
  8. Scooby-Doo and the Ghoul School (1988) (TV)
  9. Scooby-Doo and the Reluctant Werewolf (1988) (TV)
  10. Yogi and the Invasion of the Space Bears (1988) (TV)

== I ==
- In the Line of Duty
  1. In the Line of Duty: The F.B.I. Murders (1988) (TV)
  2. In the Line of Duty: A Cop for the Killing (1990) (TV)
  3. In the Line of Duty: Manhunt in the Dakotas (1991) (TV)
  4. In the Line of Duty: Street War (1992) (TV)
  5. In the Line of Duty: Ambush in Waco (1993) (TV)
  6. In the Line of Duty: The Price of Vengeance (1994) (TV)
  7. In the Line of Duty: Kidnapped (1995) (TV)
  8. In the Line of Duty: Hunt for Justice (1995) (TV)
  9. In the Line of Duty: Smoke Jumpers (1996) (TV)
  10. In the Line of Duty: Blaze of Glory (1997) (TV)

== M ==
- Middle-earth (a)
  1. The Lord of the Rings (1978) (A)
  2. The Return of the King (1980) (A) (TV)
  3. The Lord of the Rings: The Fellowship of the Ring (2001)
  4. The Lord of the Rings: The Two Towers (2002)
  5. The Lord of the Rings: The Return of the King (2003)
  6. The Hobbit: An Unexpected Journey (2012) (prequel)
  7. The Hobbit: The Desolation of Smaug (2013) (prequel)
  8. The Hobbit: The Battle of the Five Armies (2014) (prequel)
  9. The Lord of the Rings: The War of the Rohirrim (2024) (A)
  10. The Lord of the Rings: The Hunt for Gollum (2027) (prequel)
- Ma and Pa Kettle
  1. The Egg and I (1947)
  2. Ma and Pa Kettle (1949)
  3. Ma and Pa Kettle Go to Town (1950)
  4. Ma and Pa Kettle Back on the Farm (1951)
  5. Ma and Pa Kettle at the Fair (1952)
  6. Ma and Pa Kettle on Vacation (1953)
  7. Ma and Pa Kettle at Home (1954)
  8. Ma and Pa Kettle at Waikiki (1955)
  9. The Kettles in the Ozarks (1956)
  10. The Kettles on Old MacDonald's Farm (1957)
- Maicching Machiko-sensei *
  1. Jisshaban: Maicching Machiko-sensei (2003)
  2. Maicching Machiko-sensei: Let's! Rinkai Gakkō (2003)
  3. Maicching Machiko-sensei the Movie: Oh! Cosplay Dai Sakusen (2004)
  4. Maicching Machiko! Begins (2005)
  5. Maicching Machiko-sensei: Toudai o Juken Dai Sakusen!! (2006)
  6. Maicching Machiko-sensei: Go! Go!!! Katei Hōmon!! (2007)
  7. Maicching Machiko-sensei: Viva! Momoka-chan! (2008)
  8. Maicching Machiko-sensei: Muteki no Oppai banchō Tai Man Shōbu de, Maitchingu (2009)
  9. Maicching Machiko-sensei: Kimodameshi de Maicching (2013)
  10. Hatsukoi Sukecchi: Maicching Machiko-sensei (2018)
- Maisie
  1. Maisie (1939)
  2. Congo Maisie (1940)
  3. Gold Rush Maisie (1940)
  4. Maisie Was a Lady (1941)
  5. Ringside Maisie (1941)
  6. Maisie Gets Her Man (1942)
  7. Swing Shift Maisie (1943)
  8. Maisie Goes to Reno (1944)
  9. Up Goes Maisie (1946)
  10. Undercover Maisie (1947)
- The Man from U.N.C.L.E.
  1. To Trap a Spy (1964)
  2. The Spy with My Face (1965)
  3. One Spy Too Many (1966)
  4. One of Our Spies Is Missing (1966)
  5. The Spy in the Green Hat (1966)
  6. The Karate Killers (1967)
  7. The Helicopter Spies (1968)
  8. How to Steal the World (1968)
  9. Return of the Man from U.N.C.L.E.: The Fifteen Years Later Affair (1983) (TV)
  10. The Man from U.N.C.L.E. (2015)
- McBride
  1. McBride: Murder Past Midnight (2005) (TV)
  2. McBride: The Chameleon Murder (2005) (TV)
  3. McBride: It's Murder, Madam (2005) (TV)
  4. McBride: The Doctor Is Out... Really Out (2005) (TV)
  5. McBride: Tune in for Murder (2005) (TV)
  6. McBride: Anybody Here Murder Marty? (2005) (TV)
  7. McBride: Fallen Idol (2006) (TV)
  8. McBride: Dogged (2007) (TV)
  9. McBride: Semper Fi (2008) (TV)
  10. McBride: Requiem (2009) (TV)

== P ==
- Planet of the Apes **
  1. Planet of the Apes (1968)
  2. Beneath the Planet of the Apes (1970)
  3. Escape from the Planet of the Apes (1971)
  4. Conquest of the Planet of the Apes (1972)
  5. Battle for the Planet of the Apes (1973)
  6. Planet of the Apes (2001) (remake)
  7. Rise of the Planet of the Apes (2011) (reboot)
  8. Dawn of the Planet of the Apes (2014) (reboot)
  9. War for the Planet of the Apes (2017) (reboot)
  10. Kingdom of the Planet of the Apes (2024) (reboot)

== S ==
- Saw
  1. Saw (2004)
  2. Saw II (2005)
  3. Saw III (2006)
  4. Saw IV (2007)
  5. Saw V (2008)
  6. Saw VI (2009)
  7. Saw 3D (2010)
  8. Jigsaw (2017)
  9. Spiral (2021) (spin-off)
  10. Saw X (2023)
- Sansone
  1. Sansone contro i Filistei (1919)
  2. Sansone e la ladra di atleti (1919)
  3. Sansone muto (1919)
  4. I figli di Sansonia (1920)
  5. Sansone burlone (1920)
  6. Sansonette amazzone dell'aria (1920)
  7. Sansonette danzatrice della prateria (1920)
  8. Sansone e i rettili umani (1920)
  9. Sansonette e i quattro arlecchini (1920)
  10. Sansone l'acrobata del Kolossal (1920)
- Shimajirō * (a)
  1. Shimajirō to Fufu no Daibōken: Sukue! Nanairo no Hana (2013)
  2. Shimajirō to Kujira no Uta (2014)
  3. Shimajirō to Ōkina Ki (2015)
  4. Shimajirō to Ehon no Kuni ni (2016)
  5. Shimajirō to Niji no Oashisu (2017)
  6. Movie Shimajirō Mahō no Shima no Daibōken (2018)
  7. Shimajirō to Ururu no Hero Land (2019)
  8. Qiaohu and the Fantastic Flying Ship (2019)
  9. The Adventures of Qiaohu Magic Island (2021)
  10. Shimajirō to Kirakira Ōkoku no Ōji-sama (2022)

== T ==
- Tomorrowverse (A)
  1. Superman: Man of Tomorrow (2020) (V)
  2. Justice Society: World War II (2021) (V)
  3. Batman: The Long Halloween, Part One (2021) (V)
  4. Batman: The Long Halloween, Part Two (2021) (V)
  5. Green Lantern: Beware My Power (2022) (V)
  6. Legion of Super-Heroes (2023) (V)
  7. Justice League: Warworld (2023) (V)
  8. Justice League: Crisis on Infinite Earths – Part One (2024) (V)
  9. Justice League: Crisis on Infinite Earths – Part Two (2024) (V)
  10. Justice League: Crisis on Infinite Earths – Part Three (2024) (V)
- Three Supermen
  1. The Three Fantastic Supermen (1967)
  2. 3 Supermen a Tokyo (1968)
  3. Three Supermen in the Jungle (1970)
  4. Supermen Against the Orient (1973)
  5. Three Supermen of the West (1973)
  6. Three Supermen and Mad Girl (1973)
  7. Super Stooges vs. the Wonder Women (1974)
  8. Three Supermen Against Godfather (1979)
  9. Three Supermen at the Olympic Games (1984)
  10. Three Supermen in Santo Domingo (1986)+
- Tinieblas (a.k.a. Tinieblas el Gigante)
  1. Las Momias de Guanajuato (1970)
  2. Los Campeones justicieros (1971) (a.k.a. The Champions of Justice)
  3. Superzan el invencible (1971)
  4. Una Rosa sobre el ring (1973)
  5. El Castillo de las momias de Guanajuato (1973) (a.k.a. The Castle of the Mummies of Guanajuato)
  6. Leyendas macabras de la colonia (1974)
  7. Las Momias de San Ángel (1975)
  8. El Investigador Capulina (1975)
  9. El Puño de la muerte (1982)
  10. La Furia de los karatecas (1982) (a.k.a. Fury of the Karate Killers)

== Z ==
- Zero Woman
  1. Zeroka no onna: Akai wappa (Zero Woman: Red Handcuffs) (1974)
  2. Zero Woman: Keishichô 0-ka no onna (Zero Woman: Final Mission) (1995)
  3. Zero Woman 2 (1995)
  4. Zero Woman III: Keishichô 0-ka no onna (Zero Woman: Assassin Lovers) (1996)
  5. Zero Woman: Namae no nai onna (Zero Woman: The Accused) (1997)
  6. Zero Woman: Kesenai kioku (Zero Woman: The Hunted) (1997)
  7. Zero Woman: Abunai yûgi (Zero Woman: Dangerous Game) (1998)
  8. Zero Woman: Saigo no shirei (Zero Woman Returns) (1999)
  9. Shin Zero Ûman-0-ka no onna: futatabi... (Zero Woman 2005) (2004)
  10. Zero Woman R (2007)
