= List of films based on radio series =

Radio comedy and drama was at its peak during the 1940s, and most of the films on this list were produced during that period. The list includes features, short subjects and serials.

== United States ==
- The Aldrich Family
  - What a Life (1939)
  - Life with Henry (1941)
  - Henry Aldrich for President (1941)
  - Henry Aldrich, Editor (1942)
  - Henry and Dizzy (1942)
  - Henry Aldrich Swings It (1943)
  - Henry Aldrich Gets Glamour (1943)
  - Henry Aldrich Haunts a House (1943)
  - Henry Aldrich, Boy Scout (1944)
  - Henry Aldrich Plays Cupid (1944)
  - Henry Aldrich's Little Secret (1944)
- Jack Benny
  - Buck Benny Rides Again (1940)
- Big Town
  - I Cover Big Town (1947)
  - Big Town (1947)
  - Big Town After Dark (1947)
  - Big Town Scandal (1948)
- Breakfast in Hollywood (1946), based on radio's Breakfast in Hollywood
- Candid Microphone (1947), theatrical film shorts based on Allen Funt's The Candid Microphone
- Captain Midnight (1942), serial based on radio's Captain Midnight
- Counterspy
  - David Harding, Counterspy (1950)
  - Counterspy Meets Scotland Yard (1950)
- Crime Doctor
  - Crime Doctor (1943)
  - The Crime Doctor's Strangest Case (1943)
  - Shadows in the Night (1944)
  - Crime Doctor's Warning (1945)
  - The Crime Doctor's Courage (1945)
  - Just Before Dawn (1946)
  - Crime Doctor's Man Hunt (1946)
  - The Millerson Case (1947)
  - The Crime Doctor's Gamble (1947)
  - The Crime Doctor's Diary (1949)
- Dangerous Crossing (1953), based on radio's Cabin B-13
- A Date with Judy (1948), based on radio's A Date with Judy
- Dr. Christian
  - Meet Dr. Christian (1939)
  - Remedy for Riches (1940)
  - The Courageous Dr. Christian (1940)
  - Dr. Christian Meets the Women (1940)
  - Melody for Three (1941)
  - They Meet Again (1941)
- Duffy's Tavern (1945), based on Duffy's Tavern
- The Fat Man (1951), based on radio's The Fat Man
- Fibber McGee and Molly
  - This Way Please (1937)
  - Look Who's Laughing (1941)
  - Here We Go Again (1942)
  - Heavenly Days (1944)
- Gang Busters (1942), serial based on radio's Gang Busters
- The Great Gildersleeve, based on a character from Fibber McGee and Molly
  - The Great Gildersleeve (1942)
  - Gildersleeve on Broadway (1943)
  - Gildersleeve's Bad Day (1943)
  - Gildersleeve's Ghost (1944)
- The Goldbergs (1950), based on radio's The Goldbergs
- The Green Hornet
  - The Green Hornet (1940), serial
  - The Green Hornet Strikes Again! (1941), serial
  - The Green Hornet (2006), short
  - The Green Hornet (2011)
- Here Come the Nelsons (1952), based on The Adventures of Ozzie and Harriet
- Hollywood Hotel (1937), based on radio's Hollywood Hotel
- I Love a Mystery
  - I Love a Mystery (1945)
  - The Devil's Mask (1946)
  - The Unknown (1946)
- Inner Sanctum Mystery
  - Calling Dr. Death (1943)
  - Weird Woman (1944)
  - Dead Man's Eyes (1944)
  - The Frozen Ghost (1945)
  - Strange Confession (1945)
  - Pillow of Death (1945)
  - Inner Sanctum (1948)
- Jack Armstrong (1947), serial based on radio's Jack Armstrong, the All-American Boy
- Johnny Madero, Pier 23
  - Danger Zone (1951)
  - Roaring City (1951)
  - Pier 23 (1951)
- The Life of Riley (1949), based on The Life of Riley
- The Lone Ranger
  - The Lone Ranger (1938), serial
  - The Lone Ranger Rides Again (1939), serial
  - The Lone Ranger (1956)
  - The Lone Ranger and the Lost City of Gold (1958)
  - The Legend of the Lone Ranger (1981)
  - The Lone Ranger (2003), TV movie
  - The Lone Ranger (2013)
- Lum and Abner
  - Dreaming Out Loud (1940)
  - The Bashful Bachelor (1942)
  - Two Weeks to Live (1943)
  - So This Is Washington (1943)
  - Goin' to Town (1944)
  - Partners in Time (1946)
  - Lum and Abner Abroad (1956)
- Make Believe Ballroom (1949)
- Mr. District Attorney
  - Mr. District Attorney (1941)
  - Mr. District Attorney in the Carter Case (1941)
  - Secrets of the Underground (1942)
  - Mr. District Attorney (1947)
- My Friend Irma
  - My Friend Irma (1949)
  - My Friend Irma Goes West (1950)
- Myrt and Marge (1933), based on radio's Myrt and Marge
- People Are Funny (1946), based on radio's People Are Funny
- Pete Kelly's Blues (1955), based on radio's Pete Kelly's Blues
- Pot o' Gold (1941), based on radio's Pot o' Gold
- A Prairie Home Companion (2006), based on A Prairie Home Companion
- Queen for a Day (1951), based on radio's Queen for a Day
- Radio Stars on Parade (1945), based on radio's Truth or Consequences
- The Sea Hound (1947), serial based on radio's The Sea Hound
- The Shadow
  - Shadow film shorts (1931–1932)
  - The Shadow Strikes (1937)
  - International Crime (1938)
  - The Shadow (1940), serial
  - The Shadow Returns (1946)
  - Behind the Mask (1946)
  - The Missing Lady (1946)
  - Invisible Avenger (1958)
  - The Shadow (1994)
- Sorry, Wrong Number (1948), based on an episode of Suspense written by Lucille Fletcher; starred Agnes Moorehead; between 1943 and 1957 the story was done live seven times; there was an eighth broadcast which was a repeat
- Take It or Leave It (1944)
- Way Back Home (1932)
- The Whistler
  - The Whistler (1944)
  - The Mark of the Whistler (1944)
  - The Power of the Whistler (1945)
  - Voice of the Whistler (1945)
  - Mysterious Intruder (1946)
  - The Secret of the Whistler (1946)
  - The Thirteenth Hour (1947)
  - The Return of the Whistler (1948)

== United Kingdom ==
- The Adventures of PC 49
  - The Adventures of PC 49 (1949)
  - A Case for PC 49 (1951)
- Band Waggon (1940), based on Band Waggon
- Black Widow (1951), based on Return from Darkness
- Celia (1949)
- Dick Barton
  - Dick Barton: Special Agent (1948)
  - Dick Barton Strikes Back (1949)
  - Dick Barton at Bay (1950)
- Doctor Morelle (1949)
- Down Among the Z Men (1952) (aka Stand Easy; The Goon Movie; The Goon Show Movie), based on The Goon Show
- Hangman's Wharf (1950)
- Happidrome (1943), based on Happidrome
- Hi, Gang!, based on Hi, Gang!
- The Hitchhiker's Guide to the Galaxy (2005), based on the radio series of the same name by Douglas Adams
- It's That Man Again (1942), based on It's That Man Again
- The Lady Craved Excitement (1950)
- Life With The Lyons
  - Life with the Lyons (1954)
  - The Lyons in Paris (1955)
- The Man in Black (1949), based on Appointment with Fear
- Meet Simon Cherry (1949), based on Meet the Rev.
- The Navy Lark (1959), based on The Navy Lark
- Paul Temple
  - Send for Paul Temple (1946)
  - Calling Paul Temple (1948)
  - Paul Temple's Triumph (1950)
  - Paul Temple Returns (1952)
- Spaceways (1953)

== Canada ==
- Le Curé de village
  - Le Curé de village (1949)

== Denmark ==
- Terkel in Trouble (2004)

== France ==
- La Famille Duraton
  - La Famille Duraton (1939)
  - Les Duraton (1956)
- Signé Furax (1981)

== Italy ==
- La bisarca (1950)
- Scanzonatissimo
  - Scanzonatissimo (1963)

== Mexico ==
- Kalimán
  - Kalimán, el hombre increíble (1972)
  - Kalimán en el Siniestro Mundo de Humanón (1976)

== Philippines ==
- Zimatar (1982)
- Kailan Mahuhugasan ang Kasalanan? (1989)
- Kapag Langit ang Humatol (1990), based on a DZRH radio serial written by Salvador M. Royales
- Mundo Man ay Magunaw (1990)
- Nagsimula sa Puso (1990)
- Kailan Ka Magiging Akin (1991), based on DYHP radio drama Anak Ko
- Love Notes: The Movie (1995)
- To Saudi with Love (1996)

== Spain ==
- Ama Rosa (1960)

== Sweden ==
- Enslingen Johannes
  - Enslingen Johannes (1957)
  - Enslingen i blåsväder (1959)
- Familjen Björck (1940)
- Froggy Ball
  - Kalle Stropp, Grodan Boll och deras vänner (1956)
  - Kalle Stropp och Grodan Boll räddar Hönan (1987)
  - Charlie Strapp and Froggy Ball Flying High (1991)
- Hällebäcks gård (1961)
- Hjälpsamma herrn (1954)
- Lilla Fridolf
  - Lille Fridolf och jag (1956)
  - Lille Fridolf blir morfar (1957)
  - Fridolf sticker opp! (1958)
  - Fridolfs farliga ålder (1959)
- Räkna med bråk (1957)
- Stjärnsmäll i Frukostklubben (1950)
- Sune
  - Sune's Summer (1993)
  - Sunes familie (1997)
  - The Anderssons in Greece (2012)
  - The Anderssons Hit the Road (2013)
  - The Anderssons Rock the Mountains (2014)

== West Germany ==
- Hello, My Name is Cox (1955)
- Die Hesselbachs
  - Die Familie Hesselbach (1954)
  - Familie Hesselbach im Urlaub (1955)
  - Das Horoskop der Familie Hesselbach (1956)
  - Herr Hesselbach und die Firma (1956)

== See also ==
- Lists of movie source material
- List of films based on comics
- List of films based on comic strips
- List of films based on television programs
- List of U.S. radio programs
