= Crime Doctor (film) =

1943 film by Michael Gordon

- theatrical poster
- Directed by: Michael Gordon
- Written by: C. Graham Baker; Louis Lantz; Jerome Odlum
- Based on: Crime Doctor; 1940-7 radio series by Max Marcin
- Produced by: Ralph Cohn
- Starring: Warner Baxter; Margaret Lindsay; John Litel
- Cinematography: James S. Brown Jr.
- Edited by: Dwight Caldwell
- Music by: Carl W. Stalling; Mischa Bakaleinikoff (uncredited)
- Production company: Columbia Pictures
- Distributed by: Columbia Pictures
- Release date: June 22, 1943
- Running time: 66 minutes
- Country: United States
- Language: English

Crime Doctor (1943) is a crime film adapted from the radio series of the same name. The film stars Warner Baxter as a man with amnesia determined to remember his past. As with the radio series, the film deals with the complex issues of mental health and moral responsibility in the criminal-justice system. The film was released by Columbia Pictures.

Nine low-budget sequels followed from 1943 through 1949, all starring Baxter as the Crime Doctor. The sequels are more conventional mysteries than is the original film, with the main character working as a psychiatrist to rehabilitate lawbreakers while also solving crimes as an amateur sleuth. Baxter finished his career with the series before suffering a nervous breakdown and severe arthritis. He died two years after the final Crime Doctor film.

== Plot ==
During the Great Depression, a man is ejected from a speeding car. When he regains consciousness in a hospital, he has amnesia. He is visited by a man who accuses him of faking his condition. The stranger calls the patient Phil and demands to know what happened to a valise, then flees when Phil summons a nurse for help. When the man recovers, he assumes the name Robert Ordway after a hospital benefactor.

Ordway's doctor John Carey wants to continue treating him and allows Ordway to live at his house. When all attempts to discover Ordway's identity fail, he begins to research his condition. After ten years, he has become a successful psychiatrist, in partnership with Carey. Ordway begins treating prison inmates. He is so successful that he is named head of the state parole board.

While on a date in a nightclub with social worker Grace Fielding, Ordway is recognized by two men from his past, Joe Dylan and Nick Ferris. Along with a third man, Emilio Caspari, the men are unsure if Ordway is their partner in crime. They convince convict Pearl Adams, their associate's ex-girlfriend, to apply for parole. At her hearing, she calls Ordway Dr. Morgan. Ordway badgers her until she reveals that he is Phil Morgan, the mastermind of a $200,000 payroll robbery from which the money was never recovered.

To trigger his memory, he contacts the three men and reenacts the events of the day on which he lost his memory. Tempers flare and the men fight, and during the struggle, Ordway is struck on the head, triggering memories of his past. With the men at gunpoint, he calls the police and has them arrested.

Morgan insists on a trial for the robbery. He admits his wrongdoing but takes pride in his accomplishments since the crime. The jury finds him guilty but recommends clemency. The judge sentences him to the minimum term of ten years but suspends the sentence, saying, "We need men like you."

== Cast ==
- Warner Baxter as Phillip Morgan/Dr. Robert J. Ordway
- Margaret Lindsay as Grace Fielding
- John Litel as Emilio Caspari, The Mystery Man
- Ray Collins as Dr. John Carey (Collins played Ordway in the radio show)
- Harold Huber as Joe Dylan
- Don Costello as Nick Ferris/Jim Warrem
- Leon Ames as William Wheeler
- Constance Worth as Betty
- Dorothy Tree as Pearl Adams
- Al Shean as Dave - Convict (uncredited)

== Crime Doctor Films ==
- Crime Doctor (1943)
- The Crime Doctor's Strangest Case (1943)
- Shadows in the Night (1944) (aka The Crime Doctor's Rendezvous)
- Crime Doctor's Warning (1945)
- The Crime Doctor's Courage (1945)
- Just Before Dawn (1946) (aka Exposed by the Crime Doctor)
- The Crime Doctor's Man Hunt (1946)
- The Millerson Case (1947) (aka The Crime Doctor's Vacation)
- The Crime Doctor's Gamble (1947)
- The Crime Doctor's Diary (1949)
