= Crime Doctor =

Crime Doctor may refer to:

- Crime Doctor (character), a fictional criminal psychologist in a radio and film series
  - Crime Doctor (film) (1943), first movie in the series
  - Crime Doctor (radio program)
- The Crime Doctor (1934 film), an unrelated 1934 film starring Otto Kruger
- Crime Doctor (comics), a comic book villain from DC Comics
- The Crime Doctor, a book by Ernest William Hornung
