= Eric Taylor (screenwriter) =

American screenwriter

- Born: June 17, 1897; Chicago, Illinois
- Died: September 8, 1952 (aged 55); San Francisco, California
- Occupations: Screenwriter, short story writer
- Writing career
- Genres: Crime fiction, Mystery fiction

Eric Taylor (June 17, 1897 – September 8, 1952) was an American screenwriter with over fifty titles to his credit. He began writing crime fiction for the pulps before working in Hollywood. He contributed scripts to The Crime Club, Crime Doctor, Dick Tracy, Ellery Queen, and The Whistler series, as well as six Universal monster movies.

== Career ==
Taylor wrote for various pulp magazines in the 1920s and 30s, including Black Mask, Clues, and Dime Detective. He published seven stories with Black Mask: "Jungle Justice" (1928), "The Murder Rap" (1928), "Boulevard Louis" (1928), "A Pinch of Snuff" (1929), "Red Death" (1935), "Murder to Music" (1936), and "The Calloused Hand" (1936).

In 1936, Taylor began writing for newly-formed Republic Pictures. Over the next three years he received a credit on six Republic movies and one with Universal. Beginning in 1939, Taylor began working with producers Larry Darmour and Rudolph Flothow. Taylor's first assignments under Darmour and Flothow were a number of action-adventure movies starring Jack Holt. From 1940 to 1942, Taylor contributed to eight Ellery Queen movies for Columbia Pictures. In 1942, Columbia replaced Ellery Queen with two other mystery series, both based on radio programs: The Crime Doctor and The Whistler. Taylor wrote on six Crime Doctor and two Whistler movies. From 1941 to 1946, Taylor also contributed to six Universal monster movies, including entries in the Frankenstein and Dracula series. He wrote two Dick Tracy movies for RKO Pictures in 1945 and 1947. In the 1950s he returned to Republic Pictures where he wrote six more movies, five of which were Westerns.

In the early 1950s Taylor prolifically wrote many episodes for the American television series The Roy Rogers Show, The Adventures of Kit Carson and Ramar of the Jungle.

== Personal life ==
Little is known of Taylor's personal life. He was born in Chicago in 1897 and died in 1952 in San Francisco of a heart attack while on vacation with his wife.

== Works ==
- 1953 White Goddess (episodes of Ramar of the Jungle edited into a feature film)
- 1952 Big Jim McLain
- 1952 Colorado Sundown
- 1951 Pals of the Golden West
- 1951 South of Caliente
- 1951 Heart of the Rockies
- 1950 North of the Great Divide
- 1950 Destination Big House
- 1949 Prison Warden
- 1949 The Devil's Henchman
- 1949 The Secret of St. Ives
- 1947 Dick Tracy Meets Gruesome
- 1946 Crime Doctor's Man Hunt
- 1946 The Lie Detector
- 1946 Mysterious Intruder
- 1946 The Spider Woman Strikes Back
- 1946 Just Before Dawn
- 1945 Splitface
- 1945 Doctor's Warning
- 1945 The Doctor's Courage
- 1944 Shadows in the Night
- 1944 The Whistler
- 1943 Strangest Case
- 1943 Son of Dracula
- 1943 Phantom of the Opera
- 1943 No Place for a Lady
- 1942 The Lido Mystery
- 1942 A Desperate Chance
- 1942 The Ghost of Frankenstein
- 1942 A Close Call
- 1941 The Murder Ring
- 1941 The Perfect Crime
- 1941 The Black Cat
- 1941 The Great Swindle
- 1941 Ellery Queen's Penthouse Mystery
- 1940 Ellery Queen, Master Detective
- 1940 Mutiny of the Seas
- 1940 Black Friday
- 1939 Fugitive at Large
- 1939 Trapped in the Sky
- 1938 Orphans of the Street
- 1938 His Exciting Night
- 1938 Romance on the Run
- 1938 The Case of the Missing Blonde
- 1937 The Wrong Road
- 1937 Jim Hanvey, Detective
- 1937 Navy Blues
- 1936 Happy Go Lucky
