= The Gentleman from Nowhere =

1948 film by William Castle

- Directed by: William Castle
- Written by: Edward Anhalt (writer)
- Produced by: Rudolph C. Flothow
- Cinematography: Vincent J. Farrar
- Edited by: Henry Batista
- Distributed by: Columbia Pictures
- Release date: 9 September 1948
- Running time: 65 minutes
- Country: United States
- Language: English

The Gentleman from Nowhere is a 1948 American crime-drama film directed by William Castle.

== Plot ==
Warner Baxter plays a security guard, wounded in a robbery of furs, who arouses the suspicions of an insurance investigator. The guard may or may not be a chemist who has been missing for seven years, declared dead, and whose widow collected $200,000 on his insurance policy.

== Cast ==
- Warner Baxter as Earl Donovan / Robert Ashton
- Fay Baker as Catherine Ashton
- Luis Van Rooten as F.B. Barton
- Charles Lane as Fenmore
- Wilton Graff as Larry Hendricks
- Grandon Rhodes as Edward Dixon
- Noel Madison as Vincent Sawyer
- unbilled players include Stanley Blystone, Selmer Jackson and Robert Emmett Keane
