= Ray Collins (actor) =

American actor (1889–1965)

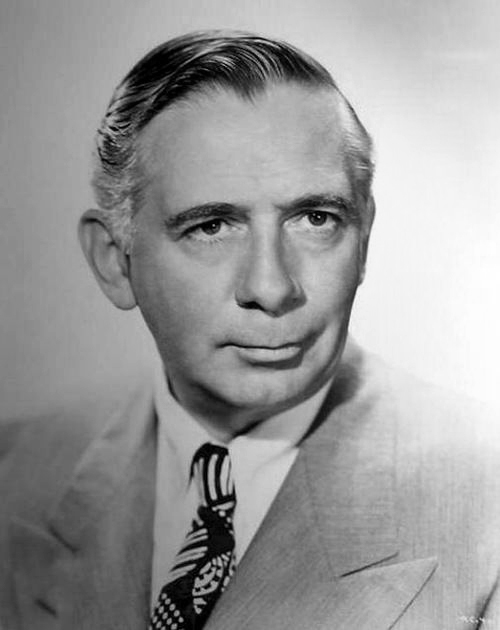
- Collins in 1940
- Born: Ray Bidwell Collins; December 10, 1889; Sacramento, California, U.S.
- Died: July 11, 1965 (aged 75); Santa Monica, California, U.S.
- Resting place: Forest Lawn Memorial Park, Hollywood Hills, California
- Occupation: Actor
- Years active: 1902–1964
- Spouses: Margaret Marriott (m. 1909; div. 1924) Joan Uron (m. 1926)
- Children: Junius Leonard Collins

Ray Bidwell Collins (December 10, 1889 – July 11, 1965) was an American character actor in stock and Broadway theatre, radio, films, and television. With 900 stage roles to his credit, he became one of the most successful actors in the developing field of radio drama. A friend and associate of Orson Welles for many years, Collins went to Hollywood with the Mercury Theatre company and made his feature-film debut in Citizen Kane (1941), as Kane's political rival. Collins appeared in more than 75 films and had one of his best-remembered roles on television, as Los Angeles homicide detective Lieutenant Arthur Tragg in the CBS-TV series Perry Mason.

== Life and career ==
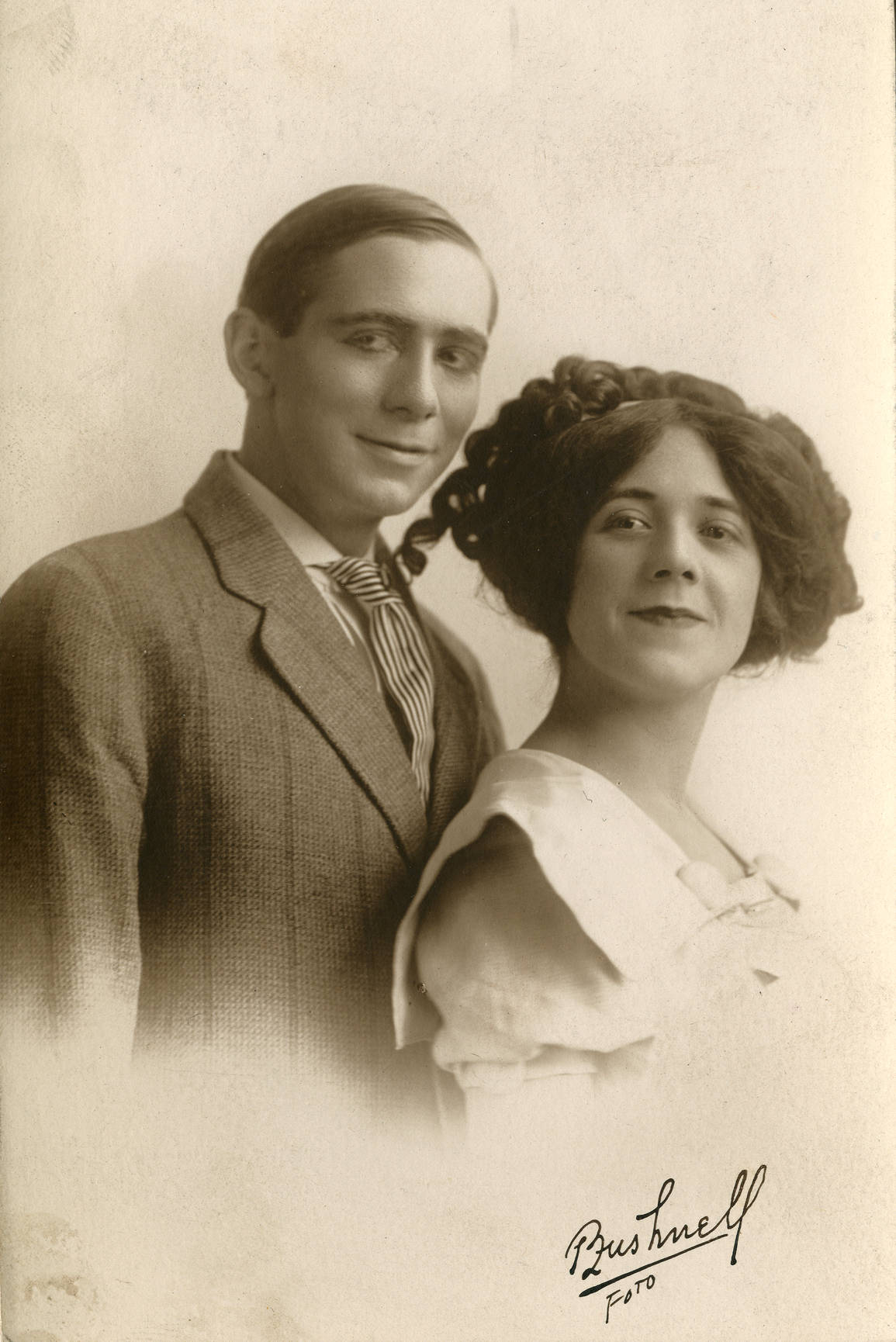
Collins and wife Margaret Marriott, a vaudeville team, in 1912

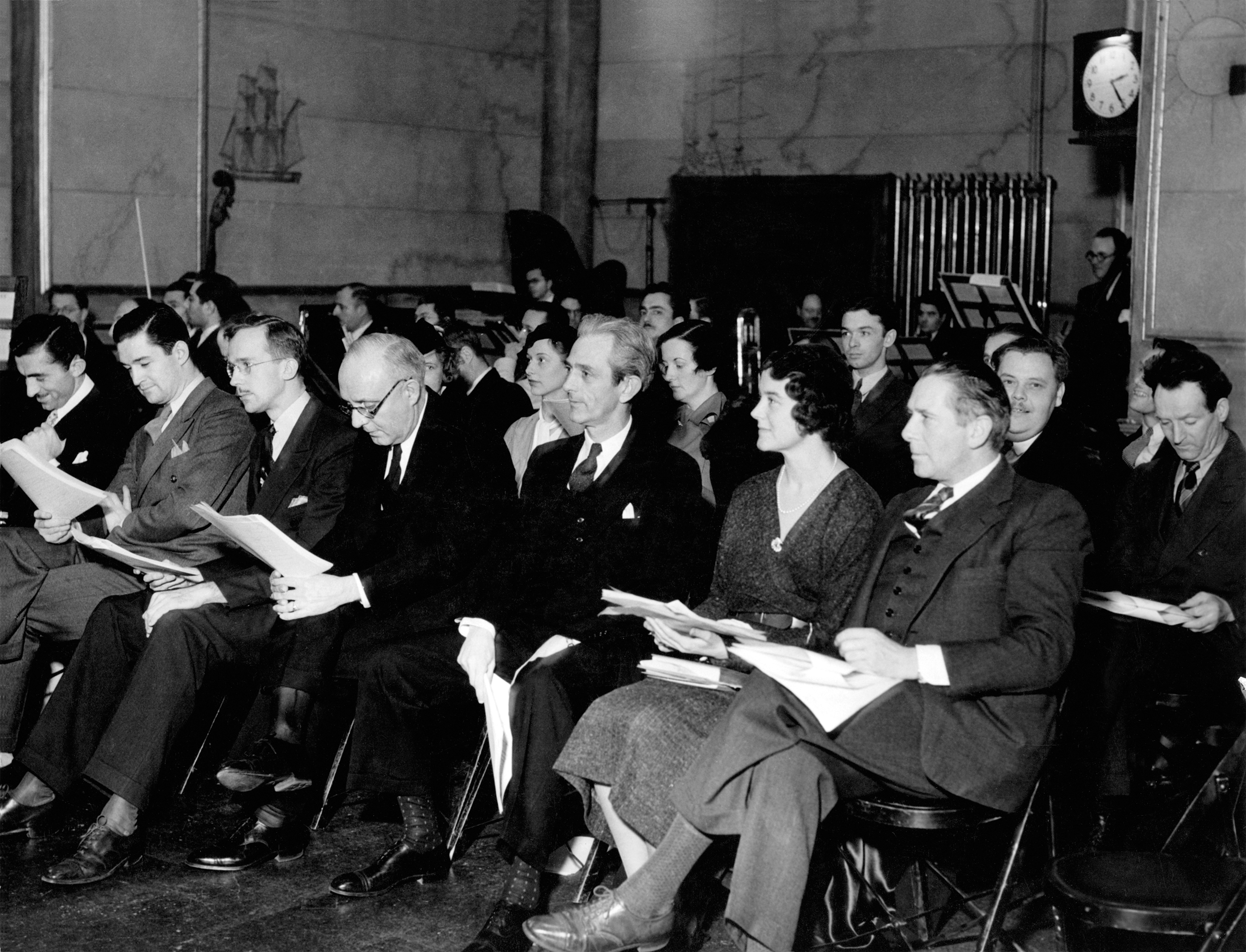
Collins (front row right) at work on CBS Radio's The March of Time

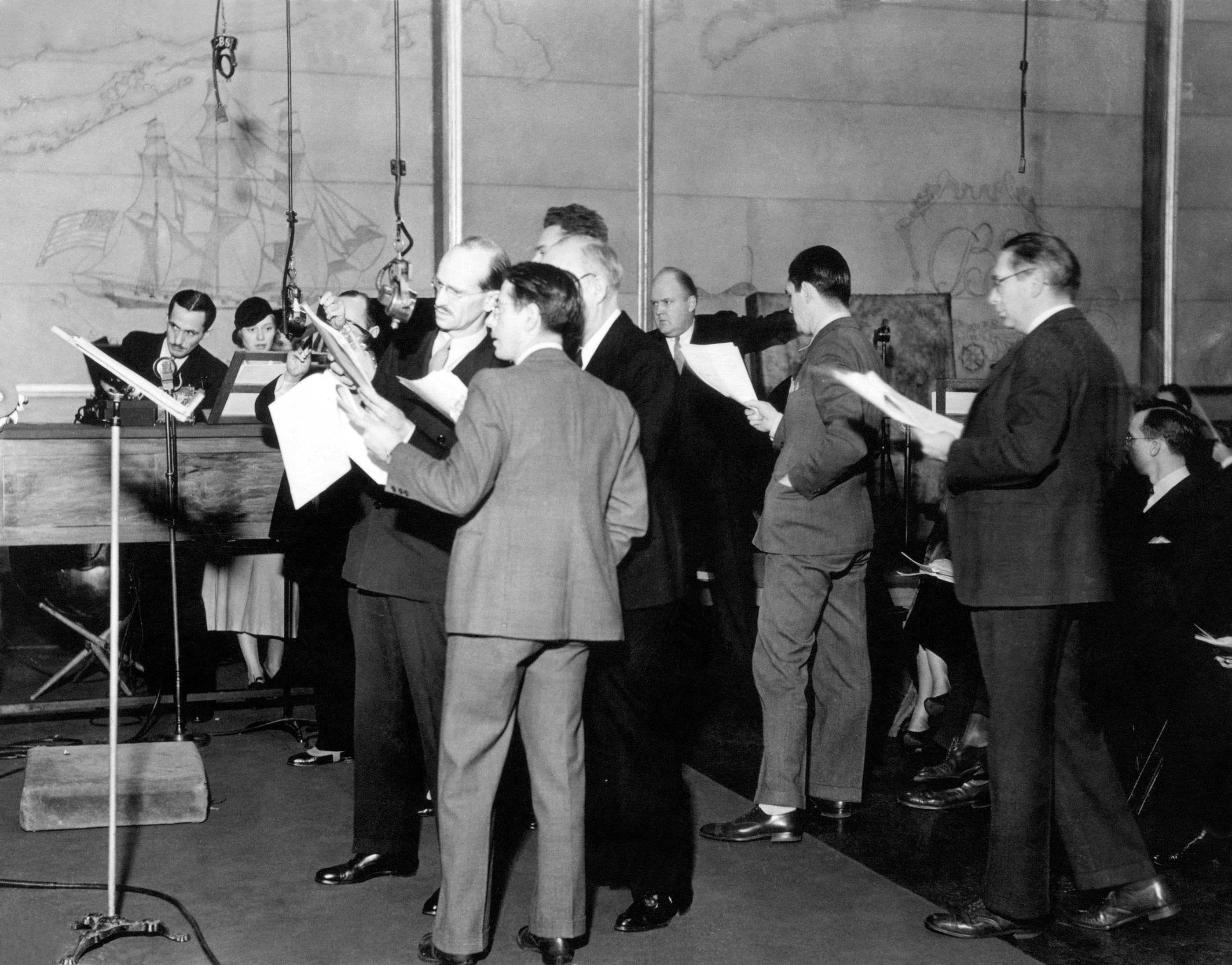
Presenting The March of Time (Collins standing at right)

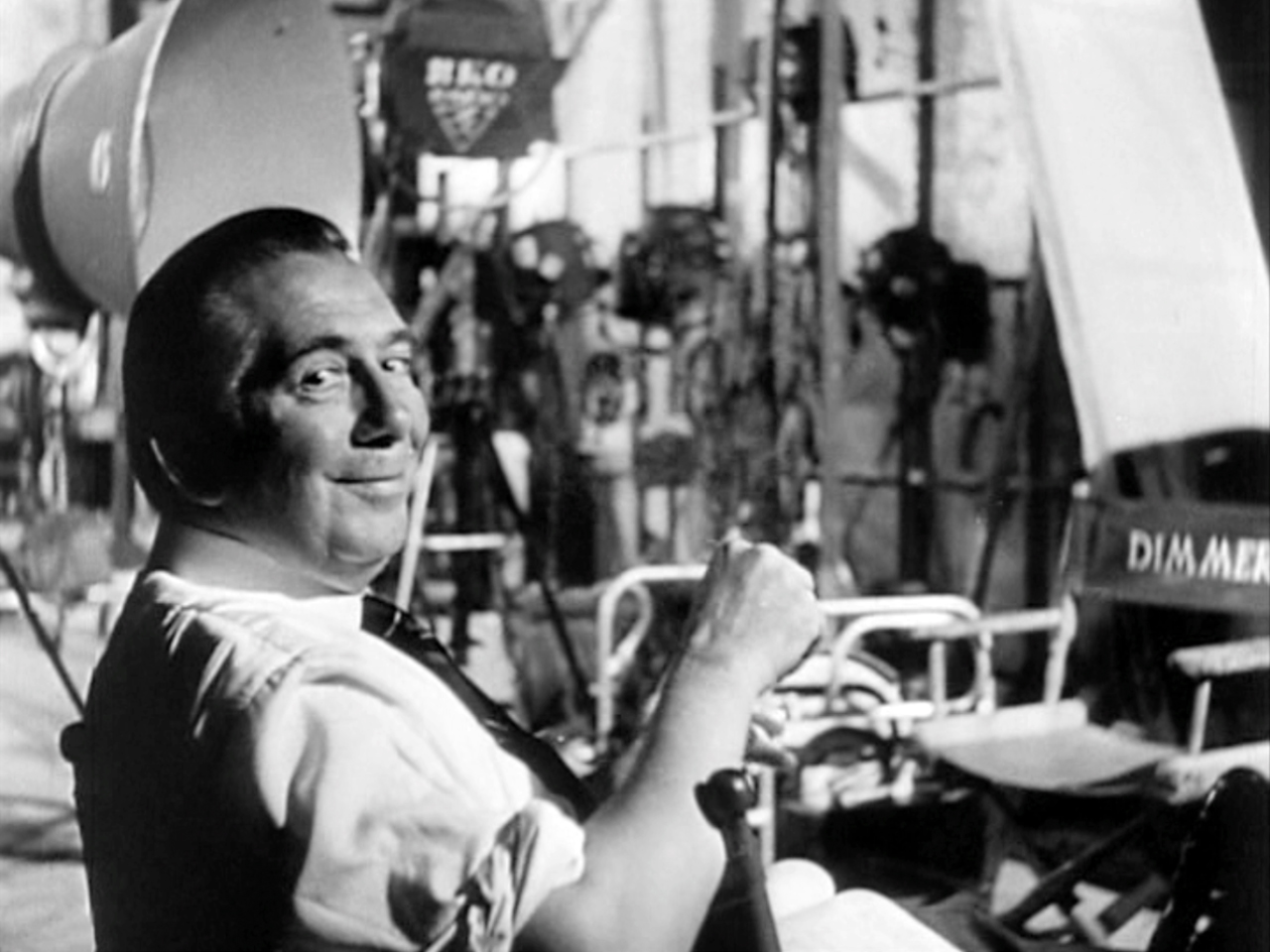
Collins on the set of Citizen Kane (1941)

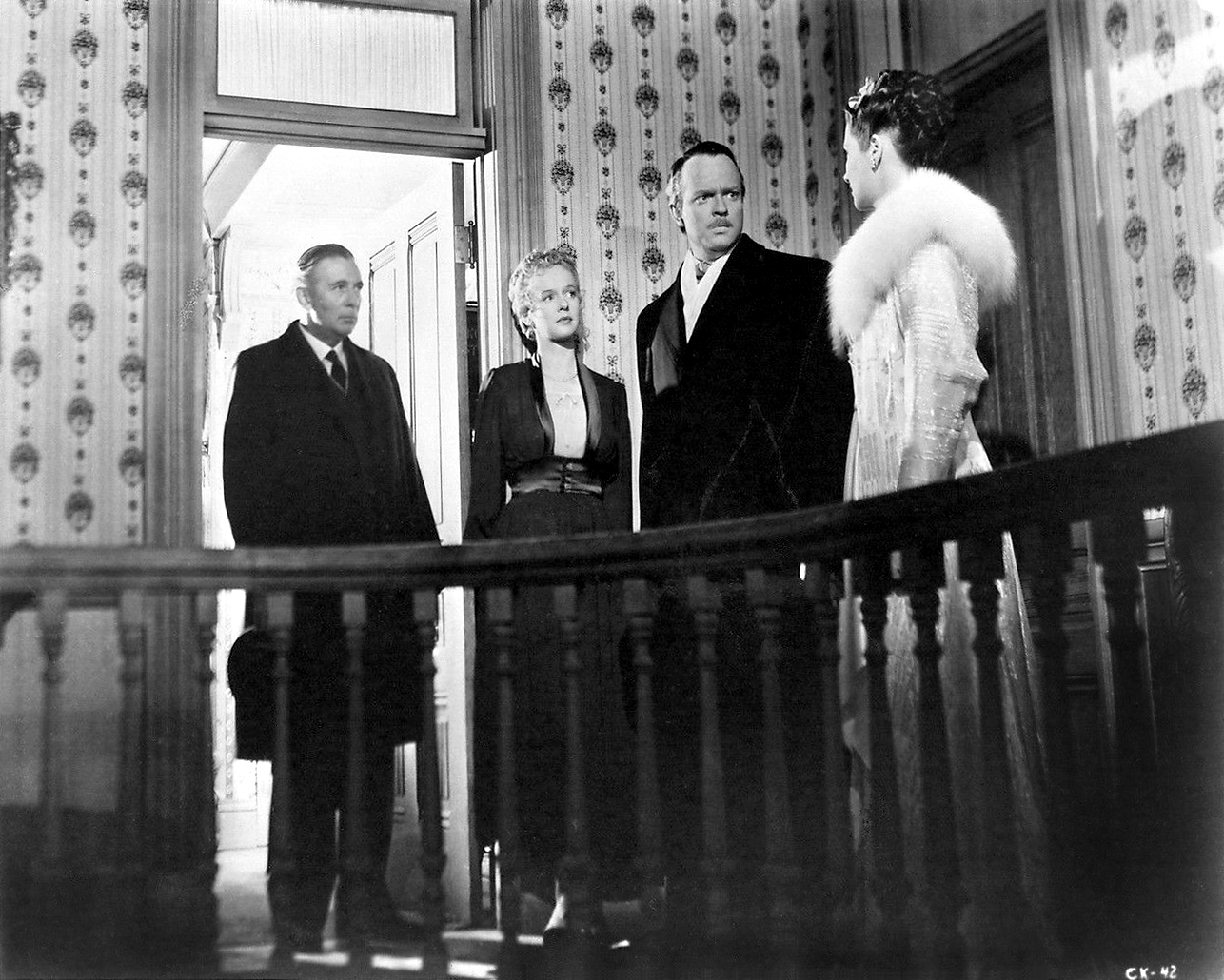
Collins, Dorothy Comingore, Orson Welles, and Ruth Warrick in Citizen Kane

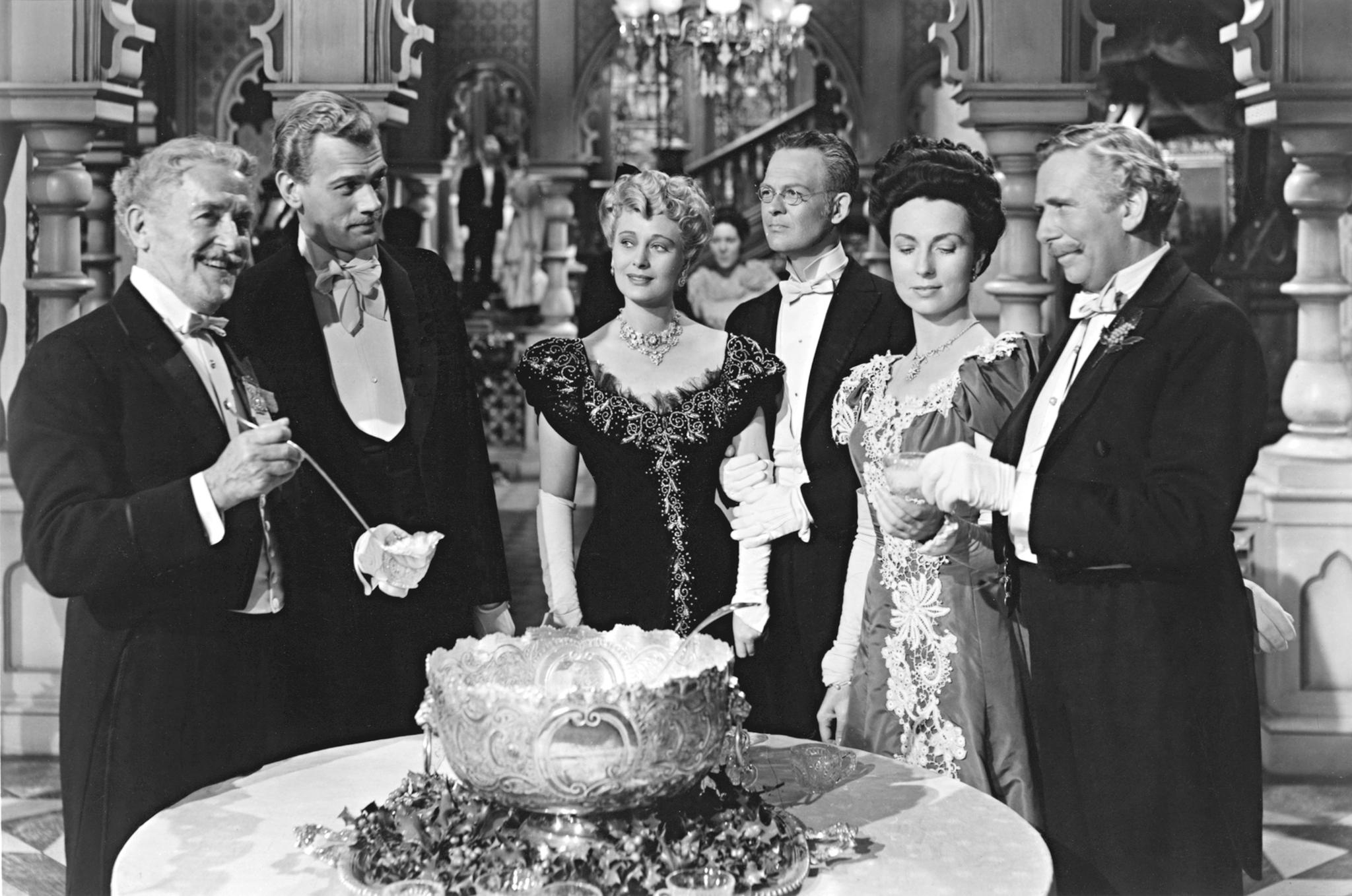
The Magnificent Ambersons (1942)
Richard Bennett, Joseph Cotten, Dolores Costello, Don Dillaway, Agnes Moorehead, and Collins

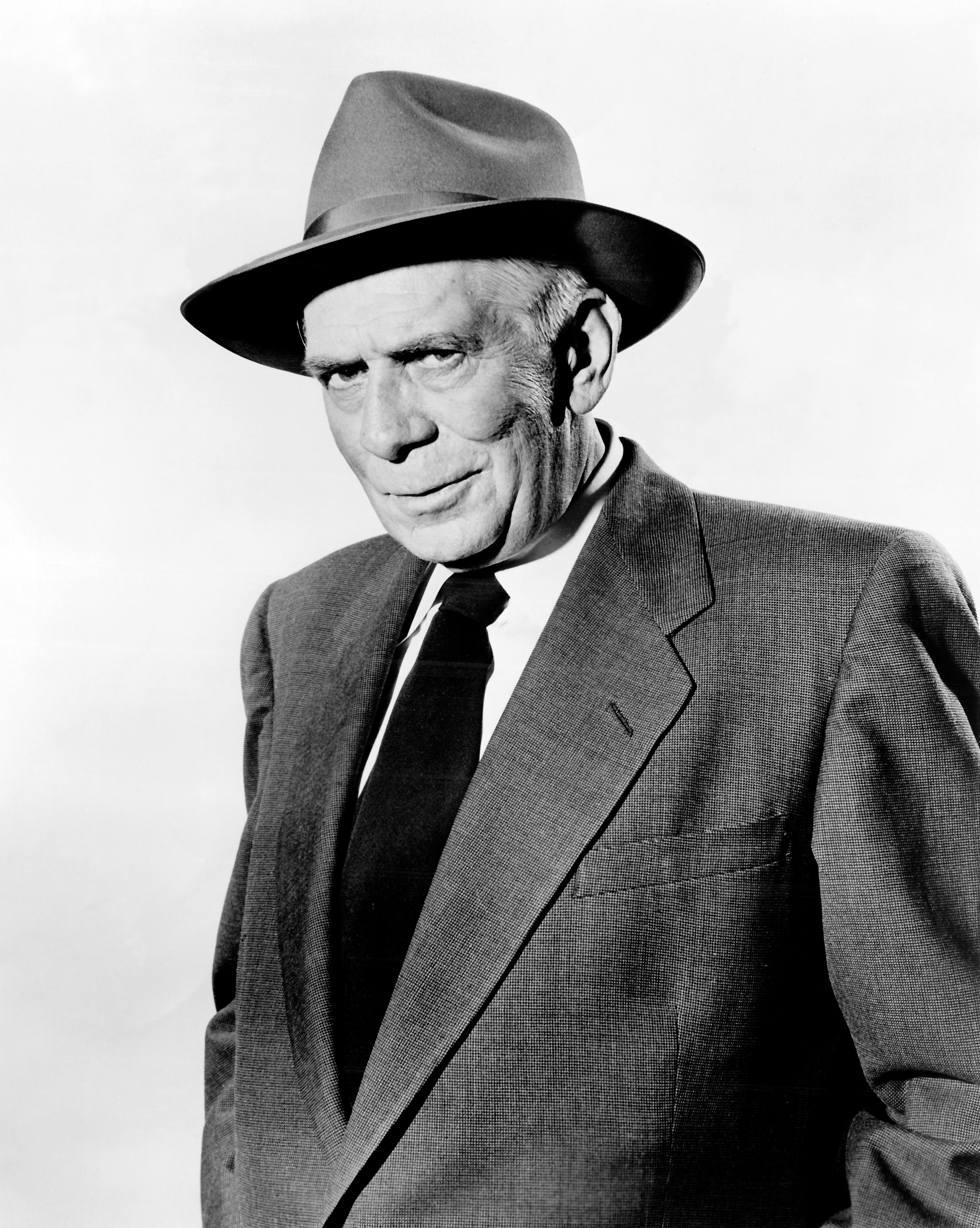
Collins as Lt. Tragg in Perry Mason (1957)

Ray Bidwell Collins was born December 10, 1889, in Sacramento, California, to Lillie Bidwell and William Calderwood Collins. His father was a newspaper reporter and dramatic editor on The Sacramento Bee. His mother was the niece of John Bidwell, pioneer, statesman, and founder of society in the Sacramento Valley area of California in the 19th century. Collins was inspired as a young boy to become an actor after seeing a stage performance by his uncle, Ulric Collins, who had performed the role of Dave Bartlett in the Broadway production of Way Down East. He began putting on plays with neighborhood children in Sacramento. Collins made his professional stage debut at age 13, at the Liberty Playhouse in Oakland.

In December 1912, Collins and his first wife, Margaret Marriott, were a vaudeville team, who performed at the Alhambra Theatre in Seattle. In July 1914, the couple and their young son, Junius, moved to Vancouver, British Columbia, where Collins worked as an actor. In 1922, he was part of a stock company, Vancouver's Popular Players, which enacted plays at the original Orpheum Theatre. He operated his own stock company for five years at his own theatre, the Empress Theatre, in Vancouver. Collins toured in vaudeville and made his way to New York.

Collins worked prodigiously in his youth. Between the ages of 17 and 30, he was, it is said, out of work as an actor for a total of five weeks. In 1924, he and Marriott were divorced. That same year, he opened in Conscience, and after that, he was almost continually featured in Broadway plays and other theatrical productions until the Great Depression began. In 1926, he married Joan Uron. At the start of the Great Depression, Collins turned his attention to radio, where he was involved in 18 broadcasts a week, sometimes working as many as 16 hours a day. He also played parts in short films, starting in 1930, including the Vitaphone Varieties series based on Booth Tarkington's Penrod stories.

In 1934, Collins began a long association with Orson Welles, which led to some of his most memorable roles. They met when Welles joined the repertory cast of The American School of the Air, his first job in radio. In 1935, Welles won a place in the prestigious company that presented the news dramatization series The March of Time—an elite corps of actors, including Collins, Agnes Moorehead, Everett Sloane, and Paul Stewart, who would soon form the core of Welles's Mercury Theatre.

On radio, Collins was in the distinguished repertory cast of the weekly historical drama Cavalcade of America for six years. Collins and Welles worked together on that series and others, including Welles's serial adaptation of Les Misérables (1937) and The Shadow (1937–1938).

Collins became a member of the repertory company of Welles's CBS Radio series The Mercury Theatre on the Air (1938) and its sponsored continuation, The Campbell Playhouse (1938–1940). Through the run of the series, Collins played many roles in literary adaptations, including Squire Livesey in "Treasure Island", Dr. Watson in "Sherlock Holmes", and Mr. Pickwick in "The Pickwick Papers". Collins's best-known (albeit uncredited) work on this series, however, was in "The War of the Worlds", the celebrated broadcast in which he played three roles, most notably the rooftop newscaster who describes the destruction of New York. Additionally, he originated the title role in the popular Crime Doctor series.

Along with other Mercury Theatre players, Collins made his feature-film debut in Citizen Kane (1941), in which he portrayed ruthless political boss Jim W. Gettys. He appeared in Welles's original Broadway production of Native Son (1941) and played a principal role in Welles's second film, The Magnificent Ambersons (1942). His ongoing radio work included Welles's wartime series, Ceiling Unlimited and Hello Americans (1942), and the variety show The Orson Welles Almanac (1944).

Having returned to his native California, Collins appeared in more than 75 major motion pictures, including Leave Her to Heaven (1945); The Best Years of Our Lives (1946); Crack-Up (1946); A Double Life (1947); two entries in the Ma and Pa Kettle series; and the 1953 version of The Desert Song, in which he played the nonsinging role of Kathryn Grayson's father. He displayed comic ability in The Bachelor and the Bobby-Soxer (1947) and The Man from Colorado (1948), and played a supporting role in Welles's Touch of Evil (1958).

On television, Collins was a regular in The Halls of Ivy (1954–1955), starring Ronald Colman. He appeared as Judge Harper in a 1955 TV adaptation of the holiday classic Miracle on 34th Street, starring Thomas Mitchell, Teresa Wright, and MacDonald Carey. In 1957, Collins joined the cast of the CBS-TV series Perry Mason and gained fame as Los Angeles police homicide detective Lieutenant Arthur Tragg.

By 1960, Collins found his physical health declining and his memory waning, problems that in the next few years brought an end to his career. About the difficulty in remembering his lines, he said: "Years ago, when I was on the Broadway stage, I could memorize 80 pages in eight hours. I had a photographic memory. When I got out on the stage, I could actually — in my mind — see the lines written on top of the page, the middle, or the bottom. But then radio came along, and we read most of our lines, and I got out of the habit of memorizing. I lost my natural gift. Today it's hard for me. My wife works as hard as I do, cueing me at home."

In October 1963, Collins filmed his last Perry Mason episode, "The Case of the Capering Camera", broadcast January 16, 1964. Although clearly Collins would not return to work on the series, his name appeared in the opening title sequence through the eighth season, which ended in May 1965. Executive producer Gail Patrick Jackson was aware that Collins watched the show every week and wished not to discourage him.

== Death ==
On July 11, 1965, Collins died of emphysema at St. John's Hospital in Santa Monica, California, at age 75. Masonic funeral services were held at Forest Lawn Memorial Park, Hollywood Hills.

== Private life ==
Collins supported Thomas Dewey in the 1944 United States presidential election.

== Theatre credits ==
Ray Collins played 900 roles on the legitimate stage.

Date	Title	Role	Notes
June 23 – July 5, 1924	The Blue Bandanna	Gentleman Jim Delano	Vanderbilt Theatre, New York
September 11, 1924 – January 1925	Conscience	Jeff Stewart	Belmont Theatre, New York
March 26, 1925 –	Eve's Leaves	Theodore Corbin	Wallack's Theatre, New York
September 28 – October 1925	The Bridge of Distances	Captain Aylmer Herryot	Morosco Theatre, New York
August 30 – December 1926	The Donovan Affair	Nelson	Fulton Theatre, New York
September 18 – October 1928	The Big Fight		Majestic Theatre, New York
November 9, 1928 – January 1929	On Call	John Q. Smith	Waldorf Theatre, New York
September 16 – October 1929	A Strong Man's House	Allen	Ambassador Theatre, New York
February 26–28, 1931	Paging Danger	Kenneth Holden	Booth Theatre, New York
March 24 – June 28, 1941	Native Son	Paul Max	St. James Theatre, New York

== Radio credits ==
Date	Title	Role	Notes
1930 –	The American School of the Air	Repertory cast	
February 9, 1931 –	The Eno Crime Club		Mystery drama series
March 6, 1931 –	The March of Time	Repertory cast	
January 16, 1933 –	Just Plain Bill		Serial drama
July 25, 1936	Five Star Theatre		"Behind That Curtain", conclusion of a Charlie Chan mystery
July 14 – September 22, 1935	America's Hour	Repertory cast	Patriotic documentary drama
1935–41	Cavalcade of America	Repertory cast	Weekly anthology drama series
March 22, 1936	Terror by Night		"The Bells"
February 23 – September 16, 1936	Peter Absolute	Augustus Crabtree	Weekly dramatic serial Collins plays a strolling tragedian in this story of a boy's adventures during the early days of the Erie Canal
June 1, 1936 –	Wilderness Road	Daniel Boone	Frontier serial drama
July 25, 1936	Columbia Workshop	Repertory cast	"Broadway Evening"
August 1, 1936	Columbia Workshop	Repertory cast	"Cartwheel"
September 2, 1936 – August 1937	The Heinz Magazine of the Air	John	Serial drama segment, "Trouble House"
September 12, 1936	Columbia Workshop	Repertory cast	"A Voyage To Brobdingnag"
July 23 – September 3, 1937	Les Misérables		Seven-episode weekly series First drama by Orson Welles's nascent Mercury Theatre radio company
August 30, 1937	Shakespearean Cycle		"Twelfth Night"
September 26, 1937 – September 11, 1938	The Shadow	Commissioner Weston; Repertory cast	
December 3, 1937	Grand Central Station		Starring Martin Gabel
December 23, 1937	The Kate Smith Hour		"Blessed Are They"
July 11, 1938	The Mercury Theatre on the Air	Russian Captain	"Dracula"
July 18, 1938	The Mercury Theatre on the Air	Ben Gunn	"Treasure Island"
July 25, 1938	The Mercury Theatre on the Air	Prosecutor	"A Tale of Two Cities"
August 1, 1938	The Mercury Theatre on the Air		"The Thirty-Nine Steps"
August 8, 1938	The Mercury Theatre on the Air		"My Little Boy", "The Open Window", "I'm a Fool"
August 15, 1938	The Mercury Theatre on the Air		"Abraham Lincoln"
August 22, 1938	The Mercury Theatre on the Air		"The Affairs of Anatol"
August 29, 1938	The Mercury Theatre on the Air	Abbé Faria	"The Count of Monte Cristo"
September 5, 1938	The Mercury Theatre on the Air	The Professor	"The Man Who Was Thursday"
September 25, 1938	The Mercury Theatre on the Air	Dr. Watson	"Sherlock Holmes"
September 29, 1938	Columbia Workshop		"The Lighthouse Keeper"
October 9, 1938	The Mercury Theatre on the Air		"Hell on Ice"
October 16, 1938	The Mercury Theatre on the Air	Mr. Parcher	"Seventeen"
October 23, 1938	The Mercury Theatre on the Air	Detective Fix	"Around the World in Eighty Days"
October 27, 1938	Columbia Workshop		"Air Raid"
October 27, 1938 – August 26, 1939	County Seat	Doc Will Hackett	Serial drama
October 30, 1938	The Mercury Theatre on the Air	Mr. Wilmuth; Mr. Harry McDonald; Announcer from Broadcasting Building roof	"The War of the Worlds"
November 6, 1938	The Mercury Theatre on the Air	Marlow	"Heart of Darkness", "Life with Father"
November 13, 1938	The Mercury Theatre on the Air		"A Passenger to Bali"
November 20, 1938	The Mercury Theatre on the Air	Samuel Pickwick	"The Pickwick Papers"
December 9, 1938	The Campbell Playhouse	Frank Crawley	"Rebecca"
December 15, 1938	Columbia Workshop		"A Trip to Czardis"
December 16, 1938	The Campbell Playhouse		"Call It a Day"
December 23, 1938	The Campbell Playhouse		"A Christmas Carol"
December 30, 1938	The Campbell Playhouse		"A Farewell to Arms"
1938	No Help Wanted		The story of the WPA, produced for BBC broadcast by the radio division of the Federal Theatre Project
January 6, 1939	The Campbell Playhouse		"Counsellor-at-Law"
January 13, 1939	The Campbell Playhouse	Thomas Birkitt	"Mutiny on the Bounty"
January 20, 1939	The Campbell Playhouse	Hibbard	"The Chicken Wagon Family"
January 27, 1939	The Campbell Playhouse	Faye	"I Lost My Girlish Laughter"
February 3, 1939	The Campbell Playhouse	Professor Gottlieb	"Arrowsmith"
February 10, 1939	The Campbell Playhouse	Dr. Traherne	"The Green Goddess"
February 17, 1939	The Campbell Playhouse		"Burlesque"
February 24, 1939	The Campbell Playhouse		"State Fair"
March 10, 1939	The Campbell Playhouse		"Royal Regiment"
March 10, 1939	The Campbell Playhouse	Shad O'Rory	"The Glass Key"
March 17, 1939	The Campbell Playhouse		"Beau Geste"
March 24, 1939	The Campbell Playhouse	Oliver Webb	"Twentieth Century"
March 31, 1939	The Campbell Playhouse	Windy	"Show Boat"
April 2, 1939	Americans All, Immigrants All		26-episode CBS cultural documentary drama series produced by the U.S. Department of the Interior and the WPA "Contributions in Science"
April 7, 1939	The Campbell Playhouse		"Les Misérables"
April 9, 1939	Americans All, Immigrants All		"Contributions in Arts and Crafts"
April 14, 1939	The Campbell Playhouse		"The Patriot"
April 15, 1939	Arch Oboler's Plays		"Three Plays of the Ways of Men"
April 16, 1939	Americans All, Immigrants All		"Contributions in Social Progress"
April 23, 1939	Americans All, Immigrants All		"A New England Town"
April 28, 1939	The Campbell Playhouse		"Black Daniel"
April 30, 1939	Americans All, Immigrants All		"An Industrial City"
May 5, 1939	The Campbell Playhouse		"Wickford Point"
May 7, 1939	Americans All, Immigrants All		"Grand Finale"
May 12, 1939	The Campbell Playhouse		"Our Town"
May 19, 1939	The Campbell Playhouse	Uncle Phipps	"The Bad Man"
May 26, 1939	The Campbell Playhouse	Repertory cast	"American Cavalcade: The Things We Have"
May 12, 1939	The Campbell Playhouse		"Victoria Regina"
July 20, 1939	Columbia Workshop		"John Brown's Body"
September 10, 1939	The Campbell Playhouse	Governor	"Peter Ibbetson"
September 17, 1939	The Campbell Playhouse	Nat Miller	"Ah, Wilderness!"
September 24, 1939	The Campbell Playhouse	Willy Cameron	"What Every Woman Knows"
October 1, 1939	The Campbell Playhouse	Caderousse	"The Count of Monte Cristo"
October 8, 1939	The Campbell Playhouse	Slimane	"Algiers"
October 15, 1939	The Campbell Playhouse	Murdered Cop; Forgiving Judge; Unforgiving Farmer	"Escape"
October 29, 1939	The Campbell Playhouse	Fred Amberson	"The Magnificent Ambersons"
November 5, 1939	The Campbell Playhouse	Father Paul	"The Hurricane"
November 12, 1939	The Campbell Playhouse	Mr. Raymond	"The Murder of Roger Ackroyd"
November 19, 1939	The Campbell Playhouse	Lt. de Trevignac	"The Garden of Allah"
November 26, 1939	The Campbell Playhouse	Tubby	"Dodsworth"
December 3, 1939	The Campbell Playhouse		"Lost Horizon"
December 17, 1939	The Campbell Playhouse	Nicky Shayne	"There's Always a Woman"
December 24, 1939	The Campbell Playhouse		"A Christmas Carol"
December 31, 1939	The Campbell Playhouse		"Come and Get It"
January 14, 1940	The Campbell Playhouse	Jed Waterbury	"Theodora Goes Wild"
January 21, 1940	The Campbell Playhouse	The Rector	"The Citadel"
January 22, 1940 –	Life Begins	Alvin Craig	Serial drama
January 28, 1940	The Campbell Playhouse		"It Happened One Night"
April 18, 1940	Columbia Workshop		"Three Strikes and You're Out"
May 29, 1940	Mr. Keen, Tracer of Lost Persons		"The Case of the Woman Who Wasn't Needed"
June 5, 1940	Mr. Keen, Tracer of Lost Persons		"The Case of the Woman Who Wasn't Needed" (conclusion)
August 4, 1940 –	Crime Doctor	Dr. Benjamin Ordway	Weekly crime drama
December 22, 1940	Columbia Workshop		"The Plot to Overthrow Christmas"
April 6, 1941	The Free Company	Bill Knaggs	"His Honor, the Mayor"
May 9, 1941	Great Moments from Great Plays		"Ceiling Zero"
June 9, 1941	Salute to Canada Lee		Nationwide Mutual Network program that concludes with Canada Lee and Collins performing the last scene from Native Son; Cast: Paul Robeson (emcee), Eddie Anderson, Ray Collins, Duke Ellington, Canada Lee, Hattie McDaniel, Bill Robinson, Richard Wright
July 2, 1941	The Pursuit of Happiness		Episode dramatizing John Peter Zenger's fight for freedom of the press"
July 6, 1941	Columbia Workshop		"Between Americans"
July 25, 1936	Columbia Workshop		"Ann Was an Ordinary Girl"
August 24, 1941	Columbia Workshop		"Job"
September 22, 1941	The Orson Welles Show	The Devil	Segment titled "The Right Side"
September 29, 1941	The Orson Welles Show		Segment titled "The Interlopers"
October 6, 1941	The Orson Welles Show		
October 20, 1941	The Orson Welles Show		With cast members from The Magnificent Ambersons, which begins shooting the following week
November 3, 1941	The Orson Welles Show		
November 10, 1941	The Orson Welles Show		
November 16, 1941	Red Cross Roll Call		Hour-long program on all major radio networks to benefit the American Red Cross; Cast: Judith Anderson, Lionel Barrymore, Roy Collins, Raymond Massey, Paul Muni ("Narrative in Red and White")
December 1, 1941	The Orson Welles Show		
December 15, 1941	Cavalcade of America		"The Great Man Votes", broadcast from Hollywood
December 22, 1941	The Orson Welles Show		
January 12, 1942	The Orson Welles Show	Phil	"The Apple Tree"
January 19, 1942	The Orson Welles Show		"My Little Boy"
April 20, 1942	Cavalcade of America		"In This Crisis"
May 25, 1942	Cavalcade of America		"Young Tom Jefferson"
June 14, 1942	Towards the Century of the Common Man		UN Flag Day program
November 9, 1942	Ceiling Unlimited		"The Flying Fortress"
November 22, 1942	Hello Americans		"The Andes"
November 23, 1942	Ceiling Unlimited		"The Navigator"
November 29, 1942	Hello Americans		"The Islands"
January 31, 1943	Hello Americans		"Bolivar's Idea"
April 27, 1943	Suspense		"The Diary of Saphronia Winters"
September 9, 1943	Suspense		"Marry for Murder"
January 26, 1944	The Orson Welles Almanac		
August 17, 1944	Suspense		"The Diary of Saphronia Winters"
November 27, 1944	Cavalcade of America		"Witness for the People"
December 19, 1944	This Is My Best	Santa Claus	"The Plot to Overthrow Christmas"
April 10, 1945	This Is My Best		"The Master of Ballantrae"
November 13, 1945	This Is My Best		"Colonel Paxton and the Haunted Horse"
May 14, 1946	This Is My Best		"Tugboat Annie Sails Again"

== Film and television credits ==
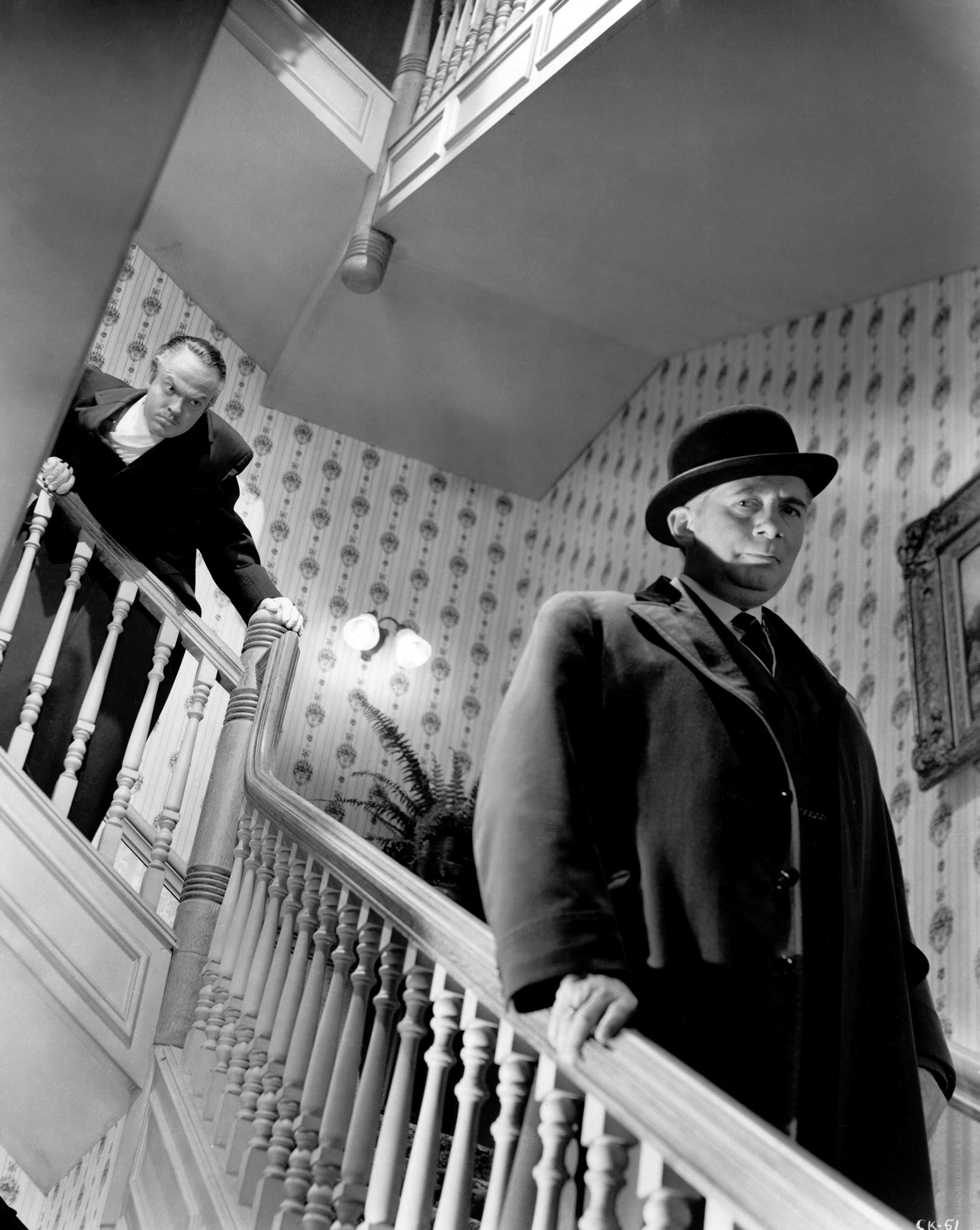
Collins in his feature film debut, Citizen Kane (1941)

Year	Title	Role	Notes
1930	Scotch Love		Short
1930	The Substitute		Short
1930	The Pest of Honor		Short
1930	Masquerade		Short
1931	Snakes Alive	Mr. Schofield	Penrod short
1931	The Season's Greetings	Mr. Schofield	Short
1932	His Honor, Penrod	Mr. Schofield	Penrod short
1932	Hot Dog	Mr. Schofield	Penrod short
1932	The Side Show Mystery		Short
1932	Murder in the Pullman		Short
1932	The Transatlantic Mystery		Short
1932	Lonesome Manor		Short
1932	If I'm Elected		Short
1932	You're Killing Me		Short
1940	Citizen Kane trailer	Himself, Jim W. Gettys	Short
1941	Citizen Kane	Jim W. Gettys	Feature film debut
1942	The Magnificent Ambersons	Jack Amberson	
1942	The Big Street	Professor B	
1942	Highways by Night	Uncle Ben	
1942	The Navy Comes Through	Captain McCall	
1943	Commandos Strike at Dawn	Bergesen	
1943	The Human Comedy	Mr. Matthew Macauley	
1943	Slightly Dangerous	Snodgrass	
1943	Crime Doctor	Dr. John Carey	
1943	Salute to the Marines	Colonel Mason	
1943	Whistling in Brooklyn	Grover Kendall	
1944	Madame Curie	Lecturer's voice	
1944	See Here, Private Hargrove	Brodie S. Griffith	
1944	The Hitler Gang	Cardinal Faulhaber	
1944	The Eve of St. Mark	Deckman West	
1944	The Seventh Cross	Ernst Wallau	
1944	Barbary Coast Gent	Johnny Adair	
1944	Can't Help Singing	Senator Martin Frost	
1945	Roughly Speaking	Mr. Randall	
1945	The Unseen	off-screen Narrator	uncredited
1945	The Hidden Eye	Phillip Treadway	
1945	Leave Her to Heaven	Glen Robie	
1946	Up Goes Maisie	Mr. Floyd Hendrickson	
1946	Miss Susie Slagle's	Dr. Elijah Howe	
1946	Badman's Territory	Colonel Farewell	
1946	Night in Paradise	Leonides	
1946	Boys' Ranch	David Banton	
1946	Three Wise Fools	Judge Watson	
1946	Crack-Up	Dr. Lowell	
1946	The Best Years of Our Lives	Mr. Milton	
1946	Two Years Before the Mast	Mr. Gordon Stewart	
1946	The Return of Monte Cristo	Emil Blanchard	
1947	The Red Stallion	Barton	
1947	The Bachelor and the Bobby-Soxer	Dr. Matt Beemish	
1947	The Senator Was Indiscreet	Fred Houlihan	
1948	The Swordsman	Mac-Ian MacArden	
1948	Homecoming	Lieutenant Colonel Avery Silver	
1948	Good Sam	Reverend Daniels	
1948	For the Love of Mary	Harvey Elwood	
1948	Command Decision	Major Desmond Lansing	
1948	The Man from Colorado	Big Ed Carter	
1949	Hideout	Arthur Burdette	
1949	Red Stallion in the Rockies	Matthew Simpson	
1949	It Happens Every Spring	Professor Greenleaf	
1949	The Fountainhead	Enright	
1949	Free for All	Mr. A. B. Blair	
1949	The Heiress	Jefferson Almond	
1950	Francis	Colonel Hooker	
1950	Paid in Full	Dr. Fredericks	
1950	The Reformer and the Redhead	Commodore John Balwind Parker	
1950	Summer Stock	Jasper G. Wingait	
1950	Kill the Umpire	Jonah Evans	
1951	Vengeance Valley	Arch Strobie	
1951	You're in the Navy Now	Rear Admiral L.E. Tennant	
1951	Ma and Pa Kettle Back on the Farm	Jonathan Parker	
1951	Reunion in Reno	Judge Thomas Kneeland	
1951	The Racket	Mortimer X. Welsh	
1951	I Want You	Judge Turner	
1952	Invitation	Dr. Warren Pritchard	
1952	Young Man with Ideas	Edmund Jethrow	
1952	Dreamboat	Timothy Stone	
1953	Ma and Pa Kettle on Vacation	Jonathan Parker	
1953	The Desert Song	General Birabeau	
1953	Column South	Brigadier General Storey	
1953	The Kid from Left Field	Fred F. Whacker	
1953	Bad for Each Other	Dan Reasonover	
1953	Cavalcade of America	Daniel Webster	TV episode "The Last Will of Daniel Webster"
1954	Rose Marie	Inspector Appleby	
1954	Athena	Mr. Tremaine	
1954	Lux Video Theatre	Barton Keyes	TV episode "Double Indemnity"
1954–1955	The Halls of Ivy	Merriweather	TV series
1955	The Desperate Hours	Sheriff Masters	
1955	Texas Lady	Micah Ralston	
1955	Climax!	Jerome Harris	TV episode "The Champion"
1955	You Are There	P. T. Barnum	TV episode "P. T. Barnum Presents Jenny Lind"
1955	Science Fiction Theatre	Milton Otis	TV episode "The Frozen Sound"
1955	Science Fiction Theatre	Hugh Fredericks	TV episode "Target Hurricane"
1955	The 20th Century Fox Hour	Judge Harper	TV episode "The Miracle on 34th Street"
1956	Ford Star Jubilee	Oliver Webb	TV episode "Twentieth Century"
1956	Front Row Center	Crocker	TV episode "The Challenge"
1956	Never Say Goodbye	Dr. Bailey	
1956	The Solid Gold Cadillac	Alfred Metcalfe	
1956	Science Fiction Theatre	Dr. Paul Sinclair	TV episode "Sound That Kills"
1956	Sneak Preview		TV episode "Real George"
1956	Studio One	Gen. Sam Woolery	TV episode "The Star-Spangled Soldier"
1956	Studio One		TV episode "A Special Announcement"
1956	Father Knows Best	Dean Walton	TV episode "Betty Goes to College"
1956	Zane Grey Theatre	Evan Gracie	TV episode "The Long Road Home"
1956	Alfred Hitchcock Presents	Herbert Brenner	TV episode "Conversation Over a Corpse"
1956	The Joseph Cotten Show	Corbett	TV episode "The Trial of Mary Surratt"
1957	Spoilers of the Forest	Eric Warren	
1957	Playhouse 90	Harris Clayton	TV episode "Invitation to a Gunfighter"
1957–1964	Perry Mason	Lieutenant Arthur Tragg	TV series
1958	Touch of Evil	Adair	
1960	I'll Give My Life	John Bradford	
