= Shadows in the Night (1944 film) =

1944 film by Eugene Forde

- Directed by: Eugene Forde
- Written by: Eric Taylor
- Based on: Crime Doctor radio show 1940-1947 by Max Marcin
- Produced by: Rudolph C. Flothow
- Starring: Warner Baxter; Nina Foch; George Zucco
- Cinematography: James S. Brown Jr.
- Edited by: Dwight Caldwell
- Production company: Larry Darmour Productions
- Distributed by: Columbia Pictures
- Release date: July 27, 1944
- Running time: 67 minutes
- Country: United States
- Language: English

Shadows in the Night is a 1944 American mystery film directed by Eugene Forde and starring Warner Baxter, Nina Foch and George Zucco. It is part of the Crime Doctor series of films made by Columbia Pictures. It is also known by the alternative title of Crime Doctor's Rendezvous.

== Plot summary ==
Dr. Robert Ordway has a visit from Lois Garland in the middle of the night to get advice on a dream that she's been having. She doesn't know whether it's reality or a dream, but she sees an apparition, feels compelled to follow it, and winds up by the sea. Dr. Ordway wants Lois to stay in a hotel and not go back to the house and visit him later in the day. When Lois leaves, we see a mysterious figure had broken into the doctor's house and was listening to their conversation from the dining room. Against the doctor's advice, Lois goes back to the seaside house where she talks to Dr. Ordway in the morning by phone and he agrees to come spend the weekend at the house.

When the doctor arrives at the house she introduces him to her sister and her brother-in-law. Feeling uneasy about the room she's been staying in, she asks Dr. Ordway if they could switch rooms for the night. He agrees. In the middle of the night a mysterious gas fills the room and Dr. Ordway wakes up to see a mysterious figure by the window. He feels compelled to follow this figure, starts to sleepwalk, and awakes by the sea. Another person who is staying at the house, Doc Stacey, finds Dr. Ordway laying by the water and rushes over to him. Dr. Ordway assures Doc Stacey that he is OK and goes back to the house. When Dr. Ordway goes back to his room, he stumbles upon a body in the hallway. He rushes into Lois‘ room to wake her to identify the body, but when they go back into the hallway, the body is missing. They both go back to bed.

In the morning, Dr. Ordway goes to the sea to walk along the beach when he finds the mysterious body that he saw in the hallway that night. He informs the police of what he saw that night but no one believes him and chalk it up to him sleepwalking. The authorities and the members of the house are deeming the death an accident and no one wants to admit that the victim was murdered. Before Dr. Ordway has to appear in court, he sets out to discover the murderer.

== Cast ==
- Warner Baxter as Dr. Robert Ordway
- Nina Foch as Lois Garland
- George Zucco as Frank Swift
- Edward Norris as Jess Hilton
- Lester Matthews as Stanley Carter
- Ben Welden as Nick Kallus
- Jeanne Bates as Adele Carter
- Charles Halton as Doc Stacey
- Arthur Hohl as Riggs
- Minor Watson as Frederick Gordon
- Charles C. Wilson as the Sheriff

== Bibliography ==
- Erickson, Hal. From Radio to the Big Screen: Hollywood Films Featuring Broadcast Personalities and Programs. McFarland, 2014.
