= Warner Baxter =

American actor (1889–1951)

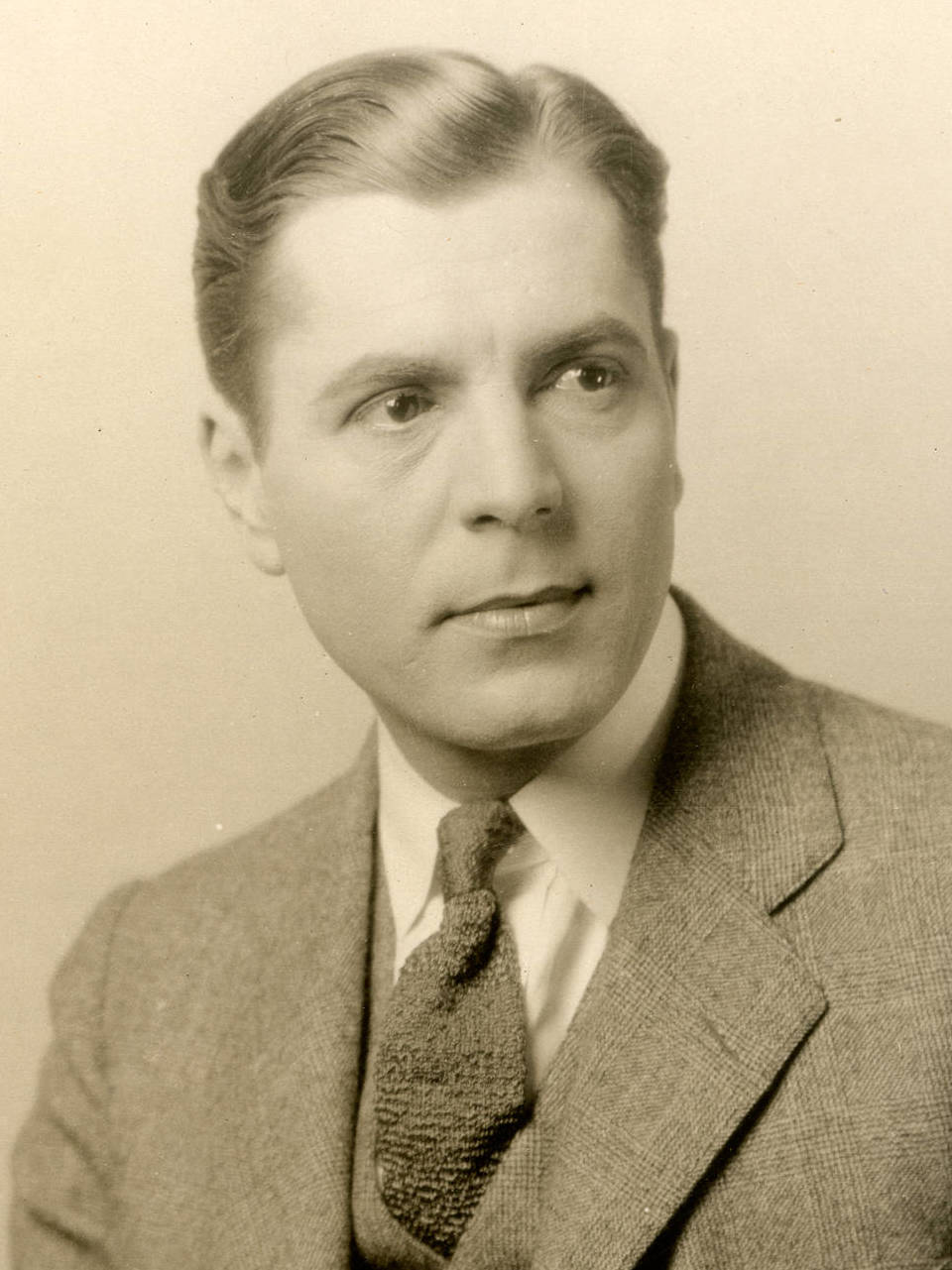
- Baxter in 1924
- Born: Warner Leroy Baxter; March 29, 1889; Columbus, Ohio, U.S.
- Died: May 7, 1951 (aged 62); Beverly Hills, California, U.S.
- Resting place: Forest Lawn Memorial Park, Glendale, California
- Occupation: Actor
- Years active: 1914–1950
- Spouses: Viola Caldwell (m. 1911; div. 1913) Winifred Bryson (m. 1918)

Warner Leroy Baxter (March 29, 1889 – May 7, 1951) was an American film actor from the 1910s to the 1940s. Baxter is known for his role as the Cisco Kid in the 1928 film In Old Arizona, for which he won the Academy Award for Best Actor at the 2nd Academy Awards. He frequently played womanizing, charismatic Latin bandit types in Westerns, and played the Cisco Kid or a similar character throughout the 1930s, but had a range of other roles throughout his career.

Baxter starred in 110 films in total beginning his movie career in silent films with his most notable roles being in The Great Gatsby (1926) and The Awful Truth (1925). Baxter's notable sound films are In Old Arizona (1929), 42nd Street (1933), Slave Ship (1937) with Wallace Beery, Kidnapped (1938) with Freddie Bartholomew, and the 1931 ensemble short film The Stolen Jools. In the 1940s, he was well known for his recurring role as Dr. Robert Ordway in the Crime Doctor series of 10 films.

For his contributions to the motion-picture industry, Baxter has a star on the Hollywood Walk of Fame.

== Early life ==
Baxter was born on March 29, 1889, in Columbus, Ohio, to Edwin F. Baxter, a cigar stand operator, and Jennie (Jane) B. Barrett. Baxter's father died before Warner was five, and he and his mother went to live with her brother. They later moved to New York City, where he became active in dramatics, both participating in school productions and attending plays. In 1898, the two moved to San Francisco, where he graduated from Polytechnic High School. The pair were temporarily displaced by the 1906 San Francisco earthquake, then returned to Columbus in 1908. After selling farm implements for a living, Baxter worked for four months as the partner of Dorothy Shoemaker in an act on the Keith Vaudeville Circuit.

== Film career ==
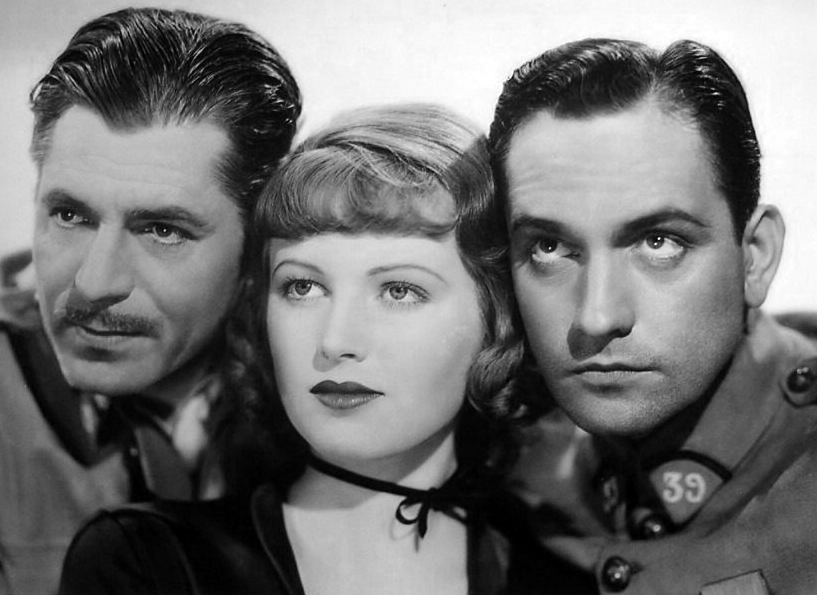
Baxter (left) with June Lang and Fredric March

Baxter began his film career as an extra in 1914 in a stock company. He had his first starring role in 1921 in Sheltered Daughters. The same year, he acted in First Love, The Love Charm, and Cheated Hearts.

Baxter starred in 48 features during the 1920s. His most notable silent roles were in The Great Gatsby (1926), Aloma of the South Seas (1926) as an island love interest opposite dancer Gilda Gray, and as an alcoholic doctor in West of Zanzibar (1928) with Lon Chaney.

David Shipman wrote in 1970,

"He is the beau ideal, a Valentino without a horse and the costume of a sheik. He is the fellow the girls meet around the corner, that is, if the fellow were Warner Baxter. He is the chap the lonely woman on the prairie sees when she looks at the men's ready-to-wear pages in the latest mail order catalogue"; this appraisal by Jim Tully appeared in Picturegoer in 1936. Baxter was certainly the inspiration for artwork in mail-order catalogues and adverts for pipes, the prototype for men modelling cardigans or pullovers or tweeds. During the early sound period, he was one of Hollywood's leading actors. There was no éclat with him, no scandals, no Hollywood careering. Women liked him because he was mature and reliable. He was a good work-horse of an actor, often at the mercy of his material. When it was good, he gave positive, likeable performances. It was a long career but he is hardly remembered today.

Baxter's most notable starring role was as The Cisco Kid in In Old Arizona (1929), the first all-talking Western, for which he won the second Academy Award for Best Actor. He also starred in 42nd Street (1933), Grand Canary (1934), Broadway Bill (1934), and Kidnapped (1938).

In 1930, the studio planned a sequel but discovered that the rights they had acquired only allowed one direct adaptation of O. Henry’s story. As a workaround, Baxter starred in The Arizona Kid as Chico Cabrillo, the Arizona Kid, a character similar to the Cisco Kid. He later returned to the role of the Cisco Kid in The Cisco Kid (1931), The Stolen Jools (1931), and The Return of the Cisco Kid (1939 film)

By 1936, Baxter was the highest-paid contract actor in Hollywood, but by 1943, he had slipped to B movie roles, and he starred in a series of Crime Doctor films for Columbia Pictures. Baxter had roles in more than 100 films from 1914 to 1950. In 1936, Baxter had what Leonard Maltin considered his finest job of acting in John Ford's The Prisoner of Shark Island.

=== Personal troubles and breakdown ===
During the mid-1930s Baxter began to have career and personal troubles. The studio system and being a top leading man with Fox made him wealthy beyond his dreams but it also let him in for some significant personal problems. Baxter said he was envious of his friend Ronald Colman. "Look at that guy. He only makes one or two pictures a year. I've got to work practically every day in the year." He seemed unable to pry himself away from his salary as a contract star. Some of his better roles in this period were on loan out from his home studio, Fox Picture Corporation. His MGM loan out for Robin Hood of El Dorado was an example. Director William Wellman's recollections in the 2015 biography by his son went into some detail. Baxter, according to Wellman, was aging and troubled by that, as evidenced by a major drinking problem. Baxter told Wellman he was fine during the day but as evening approached he was "gone". Adding to his own insecurities as a leading man, his home studio was not known for having a strong story department. They relied on the formula of having their major stars repeat the same type of stories and characters when it reverberated with an audience. In many cases, even for Will Rogers, it often would decrease the value of the actor's contract.

By 1939, he was publicly complaining about being teamed with new bright and very young actresses as he was advancing in years. He said working with Loretta Young was fine as she had been around since the silent days and fans did not view her as a youngster, but the new crop such as Lynn Bari and Arleen Whelan made him feel very uncomfortable. As his 20th Century Fox contract was nearing completion, he was openly talking of retiring, a decision he was making with his wife Winifred Bryson. By 1941, columnist Jimmie Fidler was stating the retirement talk was on the level. Some time between Adam Had Four Sons and Lady in the Dark he suffered a mental breakdown. Over the subsequent years, he was fairly candid about it in interviews. He said "It's like chasing a rainbow. You never see the end of it. Each part you get has to be better than the last one and before you know it you've got a nervous breakdown."

The reported $284,000 (about $6,490,000 in 2025) Baxter earned in 1936 was the highest paid to a contract actor that year. By 1947, he was reduced to earning $30,000 (about $685,000 in 2025) per picture in a mere two-picture deal. He was, however, more comfortable both with his career and his life, giving much credit to his wife. "I never take a role until we both talk it over. I have a high opinion of her judgment". He said he no longer cared about high budget films or being a star. "I don't need the money, and I work just to keep interested. I had a good part in a big picture about six years ago. There was tension in making it and I felt myself getting nervous again." They moved to their beach house in Malibu, California, soaking up the sun and gradually getting better. Baxter felt that the best role in motion pictures was being a leading man in a series. He had reached that conclusion during the production years of the various Crime Doctor films. "It's wonderful. I make two of them a year. Columbia has juggled it so I can make two in a row. That takes about eight weeks of my time. The rest of the year I relax. I travel. I enjoy life".

== Personal life ==
Baxter married Viola Caldwell in 1911, but they were soon separated and then divorced in 1913. He married actress Winifred Bryson in 1918, remaining married until his death in 1951. Through his marriage to Bryson he was an uncle by marriage to actress Betty Bryson. Betty Bryson was born Elizabeth Bryson Meikklejohn, daughter of Winifred's sister, Vivian.

On August 5, 1931, Baxter survived uninjured with 40 other cast and crew members the train derailment of the Southern Pacific Argonaut east of Yuma on route to Tucson for location shooting for The Cisco Kid. Two trainmen were killed in the derailment. Baxter, Conchita Montenegro, and Edmund Lowe were among the passengers in cars at the end of the train.

The Baxter beach house was at 77 Malibu Beach, Malibu, California, for many years as noted in its 1942 voter roll. He also had a cabin in the San Jacinto Mountains. He was very active in Malibu civic affairs and was named honorary mayor of Malibu from 1946, replacing Brian Donlevy, through 1949. For a number of years, he had an 80-acre working ranch about 12 miles north of Palm Springs at Desert Hot Springs, the Warner Baxter Ranch, later renamed the Circle B Ranch. It was used for years as a location for western films. It was listed for sale in mid 1945 for a price of $40,000 and sold over a year later.

During the war, Baxter was chairman of the Malibu Rationing Board and also did some troop entertaining in Army camps in the Fresno and Bakersfield areas. He and his entertainers put on dozens of day and night shows for the service men.

Baxter was a close friend of William Powell, with whom he had starred in three silent films, the best of which was The Great Gatsby, now considered lost. He was at Powell's side when Jean Harlow died in 1937. His friendship with Ronald Colman was perhaps even deeper. While tennis and the film industry were the origins of their friendship going back to their earlier days at Paramount Studios, Colman and his wife Benita Hume named Baxter and Tim McCoy as godfathers to their daughter Juliet Benita Colman at her christening in 1944. Juliet Colman's biography of her father describes in detail the very private social circle of cocktails, dinner and games of tennis or poker held between her father's Hollywood house at 2092 Mound Street above and behind the Castle Argyle, and Baxter's home on South Beachwood Drive.

When not acting, Baxter was an inventor who co-created a searchlight for revolvers in 1935, which allowed a shooter to more clearly see a target at night. He also developed a radio device that allowed emergency crews to change traffic signals from two blocks away, providing them with safe passage through intersections. He financed the device's installation at a Beverly Hills intersection in 1940.

== Death ==
Baxter suffered from arthritis for several years, as well as a chronic illness which caused eating difficulties and induced malnutrition. In 1951, he underwent a lobotomy as a last resort to ease the chronic pain. On May 7, 1951, he died of pneumonia at age 62 and was interred in Forest Lawn Memorial Park Cemetery in Glendale, California in a private funeral service described as markedly reminiscent of the film capital's earlier days. Among his pallbearers were friends Ronald Colman and William Powell. He left all his property to his wife.

Winifred married St. Louis architect Ferdinand Herman Menger at the Desert Inn in Las Vegas, Nevada, on October 15, 1953. They would remain married until the end of her life.

== Recognition ==
In 1960, Baxter posthumously received a motion pictures star on the Hollywood Walk of Fame at 6284 Hollywood Boulevard.

== Filmography ==
Year	Film	Role	Notes
1914	Her Own Money	Lew Alden	uncredited
1918	All Woman		uncredited
1919	Lombardi, Ltd.		uncredited
1921	First Love	Donald Halliday	incomplete; Museum of Modern Art (New York)
1921	Cheated Hearts	Tom Gordon	
1921	The Love Charm	Thomas Morgan	
1921	Sheltered Daughters	Pep Mullins	
1922	If I Were Queen	Vladimir	
1922	A Girl's Desire	Jones/Lord Dysart	
1922	The Ninety and Nine	Tom Silverton/Phil Bradbury	
1922	The Girl in His Room	Kirk Waring	
1922	Her Own Money	Lew Alden	
1923	St. Elmo	Murray Hammond	lost
1923	Blow Your Own Horn	Jack Dunbar	
1923	In Search of a Thrill	Adrian Torrens	
1923	Those Who Dance	Bob Kane	extant; Library of Congress (per Tave/IMDb review)
1924	Christine of the Hungry Heart	Stuart Knight	extant; Library of Congress (per Tave/IMDb review)
1924	The Female	Col. Valentia	lost
1924	His Forgotten Wife	Donald Allen/John Rolfe	extant; Library of Congress
1924	Alimony	Jimmy Mason	lost
1924	The Garden of Weeds	Douglas Crawford	lost
1925	The Best People	Henry Morgan	lost
1925	A Son of His Father	Big Boy Morgan	
1925	Rugged Water	Calvin Horner	lost
1925	Welcome Home	Fred Prouty	extant
1925	The Awful Truth	Norman Satterlee	print preserved at UCLA Film and Television (per IMDb)
1925	The Air Mail	Russ Kane	incomplete
1925	The Golden Bed	Bunny O'Neill	extant
1925	Mismates	Ted Carroll	lost
1926	Aloma of the South Seas	Nuitane	lost
1926	The Runaway	Wade Murrell	lost
1926	Mannequin	John Herrick	extant
1926	The Great Gatsby	Jay Gatsby	lost
1926	Miss Brewster's Millions	Thomas B. Hancock Jr	lost
1927	The Coward	Clinton Philbrook	
1927	Singed	Royce Wingate	
1927	Drums of the Desert	John Curry	lost
1927	The Telephone Girl	Matthew Standish	
1927	Craig's Wife	Walter Craig	lost
1928	Danger Street	Rolly Sigsby	
1928	Ramona	Alessandro	extant
1928	Three Sinners	James Harris	lost
1928	The Tragedy of Youth	Frank Gordon	lost
1928	West of Zanzibar	Doc	directed by Tod Browning; extant
1928	A Woman's Way	Tony	lost
1928	In Old Arizona	The Cisco Kid	Academy Award for Best Actor – extant
1929	Romance of the Rio Grande	Pablo Wharton Cameron	
1929	Behind That Curtain	Col. John Beetham	extant
1929	The Far Call	?	lost
1929	Thru Different Eyes	Jack Winfield	extant (special silent version only, incomplete)
1929	Linda	Dr. Paul Randall	extant
1930	Renegades	Deucalion	extant
1930	Such Men Are Dangerous	Ludwig Kranz	extant; Library of Congress
1930	The Arizona Kid	Chico Cabrillo /The Arizona Kid	extant; Library of Congress
1931	Their Mad Moment	Esteban Cristera	
1931	Doctors' Wives	Dr. Judson Penning	
1931	The Stolen Jools	The Cisco Kid	
1931	Daddy Long Legs	Jervis Pendleton	
1931	The Squaw Man	James 'Jim' Wingate, aka Jim Carston	extant
1931	The Cisco Kid	The Cisco Kid	
1931	Surrender	Sgt. Dumaine	
1932	Six Hours to Live	Capt. Paul Onslow	
1932	Man About Town	Stephen Morrow	
1932	Amateur Daddy	Jim Gladden	
1933	Dangerously Yours	Andrew Burke	
1933	42nd Street	Julian Marsh	
1933	I Loved You Wednesday	Philip Fletcher	
1933	Paddy the Next Best Thing	Lawrence Blake	
1933	Penthouse	Jackson 'Jack' Durant	
1934	Hell in the Heavens	Lt. Steve Warner	
1934	As Husbands Go	Charles Lingard	
1934	Grand Canary	Dr. Harvey Leith	
1934	Stand Up and Cheer!	Lawrence Cromwell	
1934	Such Women Are Dangerous	Michael Shawn	
1934	Broadway Bill	Dan Brooks	
1935	Under the Pampas Moon	Cesar Campo	
1935	One More Spring	Jaret Otkar	
1935	La Fiesta de Santa Barbara	Himself	short film
1936	White Hunter	Capt. Clark Rutledge	
1936	To Mary - with Love	Jack Wallace	
1936	The Road to Glory	Captain Paul La Roche	
1936	The Prisoner of Shark Island	Dr. Samuel Mudd	
1936	King of Burlesque	Kerry Bolton	
1936	The Robin Hood of El Dorado	Joaquin Murrieta	
1937	Wife, Doctor and Nurse	Dr. Judd Lewis	
1937	Vogues of 1938	George Curson	
1937	Slave Ship	Jim Lovett	
1938	I'll Give a Million	Tony Newlander	
1938	Kidnapped	Alan Breck	
1939	Barricade	Hank Topping	
1939	Wife, Husband and Friend	Leonard Borland aka Logan Bennett	
1939	The Return of the Cisco Kid	The Cisco Kid	
1940	Earthbound	Nick Desborough	
1941	Adam Had Four Sons	Adam Stoddard	
1943	Crime Doctor	Dr. Robert Ordway/Phil Morgan	first of 10 films in the Crime Doctor B-film series
1943	Crime Doctor's Strangest Case	Dr. Robert Ordway	
1944	Shadows in the Night	Dr. Robert Ordway	
1944	Lady in the Dark	Kendall Nesbitt	
1945	Crime Doctor's Warning	Dr. Robert Ordway	
1945	The Crime Doctor's Courage	Dr. Robert Ordway	
1946	Crime Doctor's Man Hunt	Dr. Robert Ordway	
1946	Just Before Dawn	Dr. Robert Ordway	
1947	Crime Doctor's Gamble	Dr. Robert Ordway	
1947	The Millerson Case	Dr. Robert Ordway	
1948	The Gentleman from Nowhere	Earl Donovan/Robert Ashton	
1949	The Crime Doctor's Diary	Dr. Robert Ordway	last of the Crime Doctor series
1949	The Devil's Henchman	Jess Arno	
1949	Prison Warden	Warden Victor Burnell	
1950	State Penitentiary	Roger Manners	
1952	O. Henry's Full House		clip of Baxter from The Cisco Kid

== See also ==
- List of actors with Academy Award nominations

== Bibliography ==
- Van Neste, Dan. "The Accidental Star: The Life and Films of Warner Baxter." Albany, Georgia: BearManor Media, 2023
