= The Crime Doctor's Diary =

1949 film by Seymour Friedman

- Directed by: Seymour Friedman
- Written by: Edward Anhalt; David Dressler
- Based on: Crime Doctor; 1940-47 radio program by Max Marcin
- Produced by: Rudolph C. Flothow
- Starring: Warner Baxter; Stephen Dunne; Lois Maxwell
- Cinematography: Vincent J. Farrar
- Edited by: Jerome Thoms
- Music by: Mischa Bakaleinikoff
- Production company: Larry Darmour Productions
- Distributed by: Columbia Pictures
- Release date: March 15, 1949
- Running time: 61 minutes
- Country: United States
- Language: English

The Crime Doctor's Diary is a 1949 American mystery film directed by Seymour Friedman and starring Warner Baxter, Stephen Dunne and Lois Maxwell. It is the last of the Crime Doctor series of films made by Columbia Pictures.

== Plot ==
The Crime Doctor faces his greatest challenge yet.

The psychiatrist/sleuth helps a parolee framed for arson, now up for murder.

== Cast ==
- Warner Baxter as Dr. Robert Ordway
- Stephen Dunne as Steve Carter
- Lois Maxwell as Jane Darrin
- Adele Jergens as Inez Gray
- Robert Armstrong as George 'Goldie' Harrigan
- Don Beddoe as Phillip Bellem
- Whit Bissell as Pete Bellem

== Bibliography ==
- Erickson, Hal. From Radio to the Big Screen: Hollywood Films Featuring Broadcast Personalities and Programs. McFarland, 2014.
