= The Crime Doctor's Courage =

1945 film by George Sherman

- Directed by: George Sherman
- Written by: Eric Taylor
- Based on: Crime Doctor; 1940-47 radio program by Max Marcin
- Produced by: Rudolph C. Flothow
- Starring: Warner Baxter; Nina Foch; George Zucco
- Cinematography: L. William O'Connell
- Edited by: Dwight Caldwell
- Music by: Mario Castelnuovo-Tedesco
- Production company: Larry Darmour Productions
- Distributed by: Columbia Pictures
- Release date: February 27, 1945
- Running time: 70 minutes
- Country: United States
- Language: English

The Crime Doctor's Courage is a 1945 American mystery film directed by George Sherman and starring Warner Baxter, Hillary Brooke and Jerome Cowan. It is part of the Crime Doctor series of films made by Columbia Pictures.

== Cast ==
- Warner Baxter as Dr. Robert Ordway
- Hillary Brooke as Kathleen Carson
- Jerome Cowan as Jeffers 'Jeff' Jerome
- Mark Roberts as Bob Rencoret
- Lloyd Corrigan as John Massey
- Emory Parnell as Police Captain Birch
- Joseph Stephen Crane as Gordon Carson
- Charles Arnt as Butler
- Anthony Caruso as Miguel Bragga
- Lupita Tovar as Dolores Bragga

== Bibliography ==
- Erickson, Hal. From Radio to the Big Screen: Hollywood Films Featuring Broadcast Personalities and Programs. McFarland, 2014.
