= The Crime Doctor's Gamble =

1947 film by William Castle

- Directed by: William Castle
- Written by: Raymond L. Schrock; Jerry Warner; Edward Bock
- Based on: Crime Doctor; 1940-47 radio program by Max Marcin
- Produced by: Rudolph C. Flothow
- Starring: Warner Baxter; Micheline Cheirel; Roger Dann
- Cinematography: Philip Tannura
- Edited by: Dwight Caldwell
- Music by: Mischa Bakaleinikoff
- Production company: Larry Darmour Productions
- Distributed by: Columbia Pictures
- Release date: November 27, 1947
- Running time: 66 minutes
- Country: United States
- Language: English

The Crime Doctor's Gamble is a 1947 American mystery film directed by William Castle and starring Warner Baxter, Micheline Cheirel and Roger Dann. It is part of the Crime Doctor series of films made by Columbia Pictures.

== Plot ==
While in Paris, Doctor Robert Ordway assists the local police to investigate a murder.

== Cast ==
- Warner Baxter as Dr. Robert Ordway
- Micheline Cheirel as Mignon Duval Jardin
- Roger Dann as Henri Jardin
- Steven Geray as Jules Daudet
- Marcel Journet as Inspector Jacques Morrell
- Eduardo Ciannelli as Maurice Duval
- Maurice Marsac as Anton Geroux
- Henri Letondal as Louis Chabonet
- Jean Del Val as Theodore - Butler
- Leonardo Scavino as Brevoir - Auctioneer
- Wheaton Chambers as Brown
- Emory Parnell as O'Reilly
- George Davis as Paul Romaine
- Frank Arnold as Buyer
- Paul Bradley as Lecture Guest
- Peter Camlin as Wagon Driver
- Jack Chefe as Jacques, Waiter
- Marcel De la Brosse as Buyer
- Bernard DeRoux as Coroner
- Dolores Graham as Apache Dancer
- Don Graham as Apache Dancer
- Anton Kosta as Jauvet
- Max Linder as Lecture Guest
- Alphonse Martell as Institute Superintendent
- Nanette Vallon as Charwoman
- Robert Verdaine as Detective
- Jacques Villon as Clerk

== Bibliography ==
- Erickson, Hal. From Radio to the Big Screen: Hollywood Films Featuring Broadcast Personalities and Programs. McFarland, 2014.
