= The Crime Doctor's Strangest Case =

1943 film by Eugene Forde

- Directed by: Eugene Forde
- Written by: Eric Taylor
- Based on: Crime Doctor radio show 1940-1947 by Max Marcin
- Produced by: Rudolph C. Flothow
- Starring: Warner Baxter; Lynn Merrick; Gloria Dickson
- Cinematography: James S. Brown Jr.
- Edited by: Dwight Caldwell
- Music by: Michel Michelet
- Production company: Larry Darmour Productions
- Distributed by: Columbia Pictures
- Release date: December 9, 1943
- Running time: 68 minutes
- Country: United States
- Language: English

The Crime Doctor's Strangest Case is a 1943 American mystery film directed by Eugene Forde and starring Warner Baxter, Lynn Merrick and Gloria Dickson. It is the second in a series of Crime Doctor films made by Columbia Pictures.

== Plot ==
Dr. Robert Ordway gets a visit from Jimmy Trotter, who he helped out during his time on the parole board, and his fiancé Ellen, to get advice on their upcoming marriage. When Dr. Ordway finds out what job Jimmy is doing, a secretary for businessman Walter Burns, he advises him to leave this job and find one with a reputable company. In the past Jimmy was accused of poisoning his boss when he worked as a secretary before. Dr. Ordway also advises the two not to get married just yet until Jimmy can find a different job. That night Dr. Ordway pays a visit to the Burns House to talk to Mr. Burns to find out why he hired Jimmy when no one else would, only to discover that Walter Burns is dead and has been poisoned. Fearing that he would be suspected of this murder, Jimmy Trotter runs from the house. While Jimmy is on the run, Dr. Trotter works with Ellen, who married Jimmy after their visit with Dr. Ordway earlier that day. Dr. Ordway follows the clues and helps the police find the real murderer of Mr. Walter Burns, helping Jimmy Trotter once again escape a prison sentence.

== Cast ==
- Warner Baxter as Dr. Robert Ordway
- Lynn Merrick as Ellen Trotter
- Gloria Dickson as Mrs. Keppler / Evelyn Fenton Cartwright
- Barton MacLane as Detective Rief
- Jerome Cowan as Mallory Cartwright
- Reginald Denny as Paul Ashley
- Rose Hobart as Mrs. Diana Burns
- Virginia Brissac as Patricia Cornwall
- Lloyd Bridges as Jimmy Trotter
- Constance Worth as Betty Watson
- Sam Flint as Addison Burns
- Creighton Hale as Dr. Carter
- Thomas E. Jackson as Detective Yarnell
- George Lynn as Walter Burns
- Ray Walker as Mr. George H. Fenton

== Bibliography ==
- Erickson, Hal. From Radio to the Big Screen: Hollywood Films Featuring Broadcast Personalities and Programs. McFarland, 2014.
