= Just Before Dawn (1946 film) =

1946 film by William Castle

- Film poster
- Directed by: William Castle
- Written by: Eric Taylor
- Screenplay by: Aubrey Wisberg; Eric Taylor
- Based on: Crime Doctor; 1940-47 radio program by Max Marcin
- Produced by: Rudolph C. Flothow
- Starring: Warner Baxter; Adele Roberts; Martin Kosleck
- Cinematography: Henry Freulich; Philip Tannura
- Edited by: Dwight Caldwell
- Music by: Mischa Bakaleinikoff
- Distributed by: Columbia Pictures
- Release date: March 7, 1946
- Running time: 65 minutes
- Country: United States
- Language: English

Just Before Dawn (1946) is the sixth Crime Doctor film produced by Columbia Pictures. It was directed by William Castle and written by Eric Taylor and Aubrey Wisberg. The film stars Warner Baxter, Adele Roberts, Mona Barrie and Martin Kosleck. It is also known as Exposed by the Crime Doctor.

== Plot ==
Renowned psychiatrist and criminologist Dr. Robert Ordway, the "Crime Doctor", is called on an emergency to a party at his next door neighbor, where a man, Walter Foster, suffers from a diabetic seizure and has collapsed on the floor. Robert administers insulin to the man, using the man's own case, but a short while after the injection is made the man dies.

Suspecting something out of the ordinary, Robert calls on his friend, Inspector Burns, who works in the homicide division. Burns concludes that the man was poisoned.

Robert's services are used to aid in the investigation, and he gets a list of the guests at the party. He starts questioning them, one by one, beginning with the dead man's sister, Claire Foster. She tells him she has no clue to what her brother meant by his last words: "I've given you one face."

Next is Claire's lover, Jack Swayne, owner of a health institute. He and Walter did not get along well, and Walter was opposed to him marrying his sister. Jack also tells Robert that Walter had financial problems, and Robert pays a visit to the attorney who handled Walter's affairs, Allen S. Tobin. He learns that Walter had spent most of what he had inherited from his father and also wanted to borrow money from his sister.

Claire calls Robert and asks him to come to her apartment right away. Apparently he doesn't get there fast enough, since he finds the home empty and Claire has been kidnapped (by Casper). Robert goes on to investigate both the murder and the kidnapping.

When he visits his neighbor Harriet, she reveals that she and her husband are selling the house, giving as reason that they cannot stay in a house where a murder took place. Robert talks to her real estate agent, Alec Girard, to have this information confirmed. Girard confirms the sale but states the true reason: they are divorcing.

Later in the day he gets a visit from Clyde, who tells him all about Harriet's romantic involvement with Walter. According to Clyde, Harriet had given Walter money from her own account. Clyde ends with telling Robert about the other woman Walter was seeing, Connie Day, who works at a mortuary.

After many phone calls, Robert finds out the mortuary where Connie works. He calls and sets up a meeting with her, but Connie is locked into a room at her office by one of the other employees. The person trapping her is Casper, who suspects that Connie is involved in a scam to blackmail the owner of the mortuary, Karl Ganns.

Casper goes to visit Robert, posing as a man who is concerned about his brother Louie's mental health. As soon as Casper and Louie enter Robert's office, Louie shoots Robert in the head. Robert's vision is impaired but he is not seriously wounded. After the shot, Casper pushes Louie out through the window, where he plunges to his death.

Since there are no fingerprints after Casper's visit, Robert suspects that a plastic surgeon might be involved. Robert gets his eyesight back, but pretends to be still blind. Looking at criminal records, he manages to match the signature he got from Casper with Gypsy Corsello, a hardened criminal, who must have had plastic surgery to change his facial features.

Robert poses as a criminal himself, Pete Hastings, to get close to Gypsy. He tells Gypsy he wants to change his appearance and is sent to the Ganns mortuary. Before Robert arrives, Gypsy hears a news report on the radio that notorious criminal Pete Hastings is dead, and calls Ganns ahead to warn him.

When Robert arrives to the mortuary, Ganns tries to poison him with an injection, but Robert manages to break free and knock out Ganns. The police arrive to arrest both Ganns and Gypsy, and both Claire and Connie are found dead in the localities. Still the head of the criminal operation, the plastic surgeon, seems to be on the loose. All the remaining suspects are invited to a party at Robert's house, where he continues to pretend he is blind. After all the other guests have gone, Alec Girard comes back and says he has forgotten his glasses. He spikes a drink for Robert with poison and waits for Robert to swallow it. Then he confesses to Robert that he killed Walter because Walter had knowledge about Girard's past as a surgeon. Walter became a problem when he started blackmailing Girard.

Girard is unaware that the police are listening to the conversation in the next room, and as soon as he is done they rush in to arrest him. The poison is then pumped out of Robert's stomach.

== Cast ==
- Warner Baxter as Dr. Robert Ordway
- Adele Roberts as Claire Foster (as Adelle Roberts)
- Martin Kosleck as Karl Ganss
- Mona Barrie as Harriet Travers
- Marvin Miller as Casper (Gypsy Corsello)
- Charles D. Brown as Insp. Burns
- Robert Barrat as Clyde Travers (as Robert H. Barrat)

== Production ==
While still a work-in-progress, the film was referred to as Exposed by the Crime Doctor. Warner Baxter returned as the "crime doctor" Dr. Robert Ordway for the sixth time. The film was directed by William Castle with assistance from Carl Hieke. Rudolph C. Fluthow was in charge of production for Columbia Pictures, while Audrey Wisburg and Eric Taylor wrote the screenplay. Henry Freulich and Philip Tannura signed on as cinematographers. Mischa Bakaleinikoff headed the musical direction, and Dwight Caldwell edited the film. Although still goosebumps-inducing, the film was relatively milder in its delivery of horror, compared to the preceding films in the series.

== See also ==
- List of films featuring diabetes

== Bibliography ==
- Michael R. Pitts (2010). Columbia Pictures Horror, Science Fiction and Fantasy Films, 1928—1982. McFarland. ISBN 978-0-7864-5766-3.
