= The Millerson Case =

1947 film by George Archainbaud

- Directed by: George Archainbaud
- Written by: Carlton Sand; Gordon Rigby
- Screenplay by: Raymond L. Schrock
- Based on: Crime Doctor; 1940-47 radio program by Max Marcin
- Produced by: Rudolph C. Flothow
- Starring: Warner Baxter; Nancy Saunders; Clem Bevans
- Cinematography: Philip Tannura
- Edited by: Dwight Caldwell
- Music by: Irving Gertz
- Production company: Larry Darmour Productions
- Distributed by: Columbia Pictures
- Release date: May 29, 1947
- Running time: 72 minutes
- Country: United States
- Language: English

The Millerson Case is a 1947 American mystery drama film directed by George Archainbaud and starring Warner Baxter, Nancy Saunders and Clem Bevans. In the 8th film of Columbia's Crime Doctor series, Dr. Robert Ordway (Warner Baxter) is vacationing in the Blue Ridge Mountains district of West Virginia when a Typhoid fever epidemic breaks out. Three deaths occur, with the first two being typhoid-caused. The death of the third person is from poisoning.

== Plot summary ==
Dr. Robert Ordway is vacationing in the Blue Ridge Mountains district of West Virginia when a typhoid epidemic breaks out. Three deaths occur with the first two being typhoid-caused but the death of the third person, Ward Beachey, is a case of poisoning.

Ordway learns that Beachey was the town Romeo with many enemies and that most of those had access to the poison. Doc Millerson, who has a suspicion who the guilty party is, receives a note in a woman's handwriting requesting a meeting at the river bank. He goes there and is killed in an ambush by a rifle shot. Following the note as a clue, Ordway visits the house of Walker Bell and traps Minnich's young daughter into confessing that her father made her write the note. Minnich confesses he had killed Beachey for trying to break up his home and Doc Millerson because he suspected him.

== Cast ==
- Warner Baxter as Dr. Robert Ordway
- Nancy Saunders as Belle Englehart
- Clem Bevans as Sheriff Luke Akers
- Griff Barnett as Doc Sam Millerson
- Paul Guilfoyle as Jud Rookstool
- James Bell as Walker Bell
- Addison Richards as Dr. Wickersham
- Mark Dennis as Bije Minnich
- Robert Kellard as Dr. Prescott (as Robert Stephens)
