= Crime Doctor's Man Hunt =

1946 film by William Castle

- Directed by: William Castle
- Written by: Eric Taylor; Leigh Brackett
- Based on: Crime Doctor; 1940-47 radio program by Max Marcin
- Produced by: Rudolph C. Flothow
- Starring: Warner Baxter; Ellen Drew; William Frawley
- Cinematography: Philip Tannura
- Edited by: Dwight Caldwell
- Music by: Paul Sawtell
- Production company: Larry Darmour Productions
- Distributed by: Columbia Pictures
- Release date: October 24, 1946
- Running time: 61 minutes
- Country: United States
- Language: English

Crime Doctor's Man Hunt is a 1946 American mystery film directed by William Castle and starring Warner Baxter, Ellen Drew and William Frawley. It is part of the Crime Doctor series of films made by Columbia Pictures.

The film's sets were designed by the German art director Hans Radon.

== Plot ==
A man goes to a psychiatrist, complaining that he has been entering fugue states. Afterward, the man's fiancée visits the doctor to find out what's going on. He sends her away.

Later, the Crime Doctor sees the man dead — being carried by two thugs. No one knows anything and some question if the man was even dead. Meanwhile, we find that a mysterious woman hired the thugs to dispose of the body.

The Crime Doctor is on his own to find out what has happened. He investigates a nearby abandoned house where he is attacked by the two thugs who then flee. He tracks down the owner of the house whose daughter turns out to be the fiancée, Irene. We also learn that the mysterious woman is her estranged "sister," Natalie.

With the police, he sets up a trap to catch Natalie. But it is actually Irene with a blond wig and glasses.

== Partial cast ==
- Warner Baxter as Dr. Robert Ordway
- Ellen Drew as Irene Cotter
- William Frawley as Inspector Harry B. Manning
- Frank Sully as Rigger
- Claire Carleton as Ruby Farrell
- Bernard Nedell as Waldo
- Jack Lee as Sgt. Bradley
- Francis Pierlot as Gerald Cotter

== Bibliography ==
- Erickson, Hal. From Radio to the Big Screen: Hollywood Films Featuring Broadcast Personalities and Programs. McFarland, 2014.
