= Crime Doctor (radio program) =

1940s radio crime drama

- Other names: Max Marcin's Crime Doctor
- Genre: Crime drama
- Running time: 25 minutes
- Country of origin: United States
- Language: English
- Syndicates: CBS
- Starring: Ray Collins; House Jameson; John McIntire; Hugh Marlowe; Brian Donlevy; Everett Sloane
- Announcer: Ken Roberts; Charles O'Connor; Nelson Case
- Created by: Max Marcin
- Written by: Max Marcin
- Directed by: Paul Monroe; Jack Johnstone
- Produced by: Max Marcin
- Original release: August 4, 1940 – October 19, 1947
- Sponsored by: Philip Morris Cigarettes

Crime Doctor is a radio crime drama in the United States. Sponsored by Philip Morris cigarettes, it was broadcast on CBS August 4, 1940 – October 19, 1947.

== Premise ==
Crime Doctor featured two premises that were unusual—if not unique—in radio crime drama. The first was that the central figure, Dr. Benjamin Ordway, had survived amnesia. Radio historian John Dunning described the situation as follows:

Originally a criminal himself, he got zapped on the head and lost his memory. With the help of a kind doctor, he began to build a new life and identity, studying medicine and eventually going into psychiatry. ... He decided to specialize in criminal psychiatry because of his intense interest in, and understanding of, the criminal mind.

A photographic story about the program in a 1946 issue of Radio Mirror magazine contained the following comment: "Dr. Ordway ... has become such a favorite with the Police Department of his city that he is constantly being called upon for his shrewd and eager opinions in baffling murder cases. Invariably, his keen medical mind fastens upon the one clue in a case which might otherwise be lost."

The second unusual premise was that, as a 1943 advertisement for a radio station noted, stories dealt with the rehabilitation of criminals. The background for this aspect of the program was that before suffering amnesia, Ordway had been a criminal mastermind. Thus, he went from heading a criminal gang to helping to rehabilitate criminals.

In 1943, Crime Doctor was reported to be one of three then-current programs "credited with being based on actual case histories of criminals and trials." The others were Famous Jury Trials and Gang Busters.

== Format ==
The program underwent a change in format in 1942. Although Ordway remained the central character, the stories were presented differently. Crime Doctor initially had Ordway as a member of the parole board. When a convict came before the board, Ordway heard the presentation and then asked a "jury" selected from the studio audience to decide the prisoner's fate. Each jury contained an equal number of men and women.

After the 1942 revision, Ordway worked from home, no longer officially affiliated with government entities, "working with ex-convicts and helping them keep out of trouble, while at the same time aiding the local police in the unending fight against crime." In this phase of the program, listeners knew the culprit's identity from the beginning of the episode; the mystery was how he would be caught. Near the end of each episode, the announcer said, "Ladies and gentlemen, in exactly 57 seconds, Dr. Ordway will be back to tell you the piece of evidence overlooked by the suspect."

== Creator's criminal connections ==
Max Marcin created Crime Doctor for radio. He also produced the program and wrote its scripts—260 of them as of December 1945. Marcin had been a police reporter for the New York World newspaper. A contemporary newspaper story reported, "In those days he knew practically every underworld character in New York, some of them intimately." Thus, Marcin had much information from which he could draw for plots. The article noted that Marcin's characters "seem so true to life because they are from life," adding that he maintained his underworld contacts. At one point, in 1945, Marcin even had his name featured in the program's title, when it was changed to Max Marcin's Crime Doctor.

== Characters and Cast ==
Character	Actor/Actress
Dr. Benjamin Ordway	Ray Collins; House Jameson; John McIntire; Hugh Marlowe; Brian Donlevy; Everett Sloane
District Attorney Miller	Edgar Stehli
Harold Sayers	Walter Vaughan
Inspector Ross	Walter Greaza
Frieda	Edith Arnold

Sources: On the Air: The Encyclopedia of Old-Time Radio, The Big Broadcast: 1920-1950

In 1942, McIntire left the program. Ed Jerome replaced him in the cast, portraying a new lead, Dr. Leroy Hart.

Announcers were Ken Roberts, Charles O'Connor Nelson Case and Carl Frank. Ray Bloch led the orchestra.

== Adaptation ==
In 1943, Columbia Pictures began making movies based on the Crime Doctor program, producing a total of 10 films about the character. All starred Warner Baxter in the role, renamed Robert Ordway.

== See also ==
- Crime Doctor (character)—the character on which the radio program and movies were based;
- Crime Doctor (film)—the first of the movies based on the Crime Doctor radio program
