= Crime Doctor (character) =

Phil Morgan/Dr. Benjamin Ordway/Dr. Robert Ordway
- Created by: Max Marcin
- Portrayed by: Ray Collins (radio); House Jameson (radio); John McIntire (radio); Hugh Marlowe (radio); Brian Donlevy (radio); Everett Sloane (radio); Warner Baxter (films)

In-universe information
- Gender: Male
- Occupation: Criminal/criminal psychiatrist
- Nationality: American

The Crime Doctor is a fictional character created by Max Marcin. Criminal Phil Morgan suffers amnesia and becomes criminal psychologist Dr. Ordway. He uses his expertise to solve crimes as well as to help patients.

The character was the hero of the CBS radio program Crime Doctor on Sunday nights between 1940 and 1947. Dr. Benjamin Ordway was played by Ray Collins, House Jameson, Brian Donlevy, Hugh Marlowe, Everett Sloane and John McIntire.

Columbia Pictures Corporation made a series of 10 low-budget "Crime Doctor" mysteries from 1943 through 1949. In them, Dr. Robert Ordway was played exclusively by Warner Baxter. In the first film, as an in-joke, Collins played the supporting role of Dr. John Carey, the Crime Doctor's doctor. Baxter was in poor health much of the time while working on the series, and two years after making the tenth film, he died of pneumonia.

== Films ==
- Crime Doctor (1943)
- The Crime Doctor's Strangest Case (1943)
- Shadows in the Night (1944) (a.k.a. The Crime Doctor's Rendezvous)
- Crime Doctor's Warning (1945)
- The Crime Doctor's Courage (1945)
- Just Before Dawn (1946) (a.k.a. Exposed by the Crime Doctor)
- The Crime Doctor's Man Hunt (1946)
- The Millerson Case (1947) (a.k.a. The Crime Doctor's Vacation)
- The Crime Doctor's Gamble (1947)
- The Crime Doctor's Diary (1949)
