= Rudolph Flothow =

German-born movie and television producer

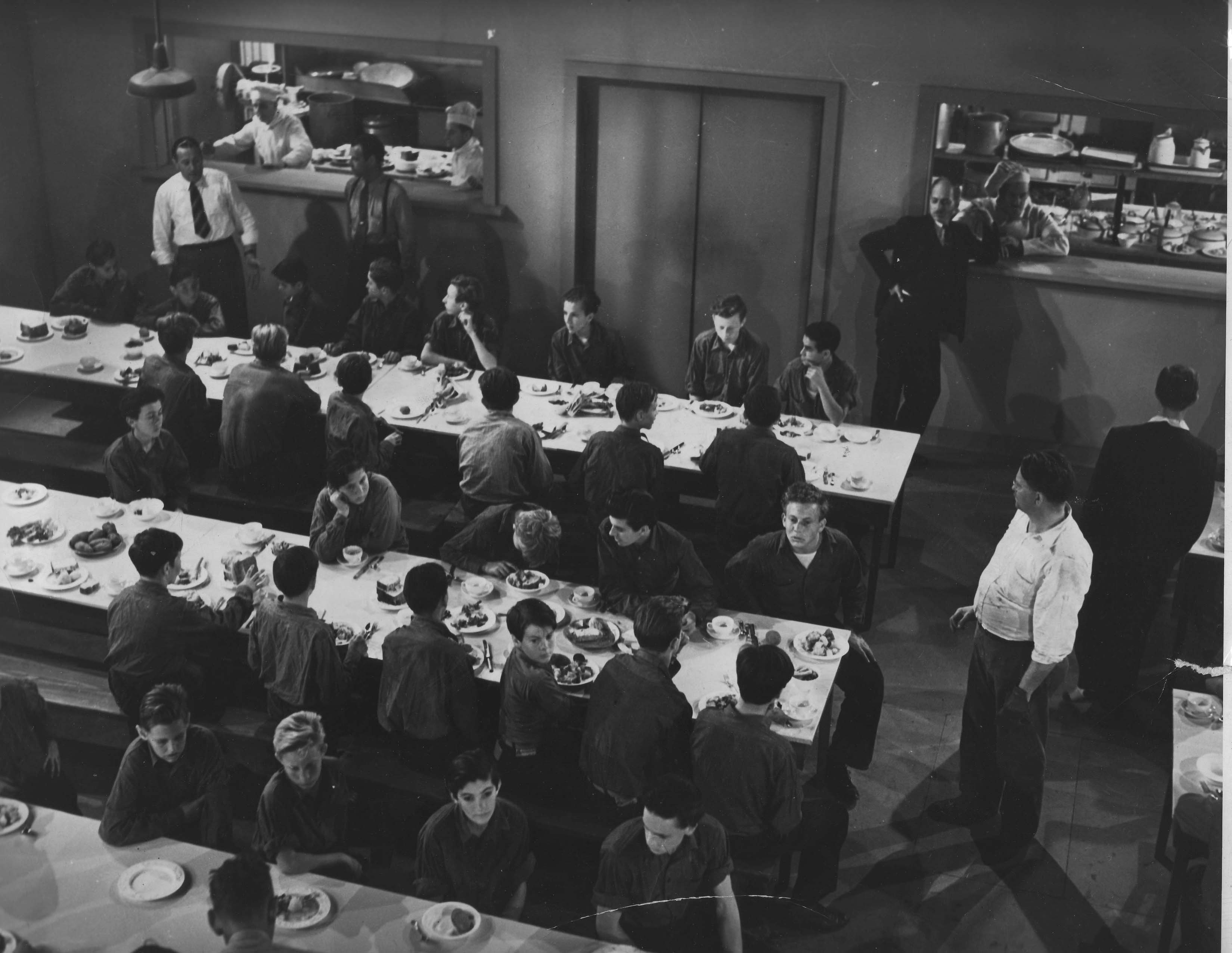
Rudolph C. Flothow (leaning against back wall) on the set of a film shoot in the 1930s.

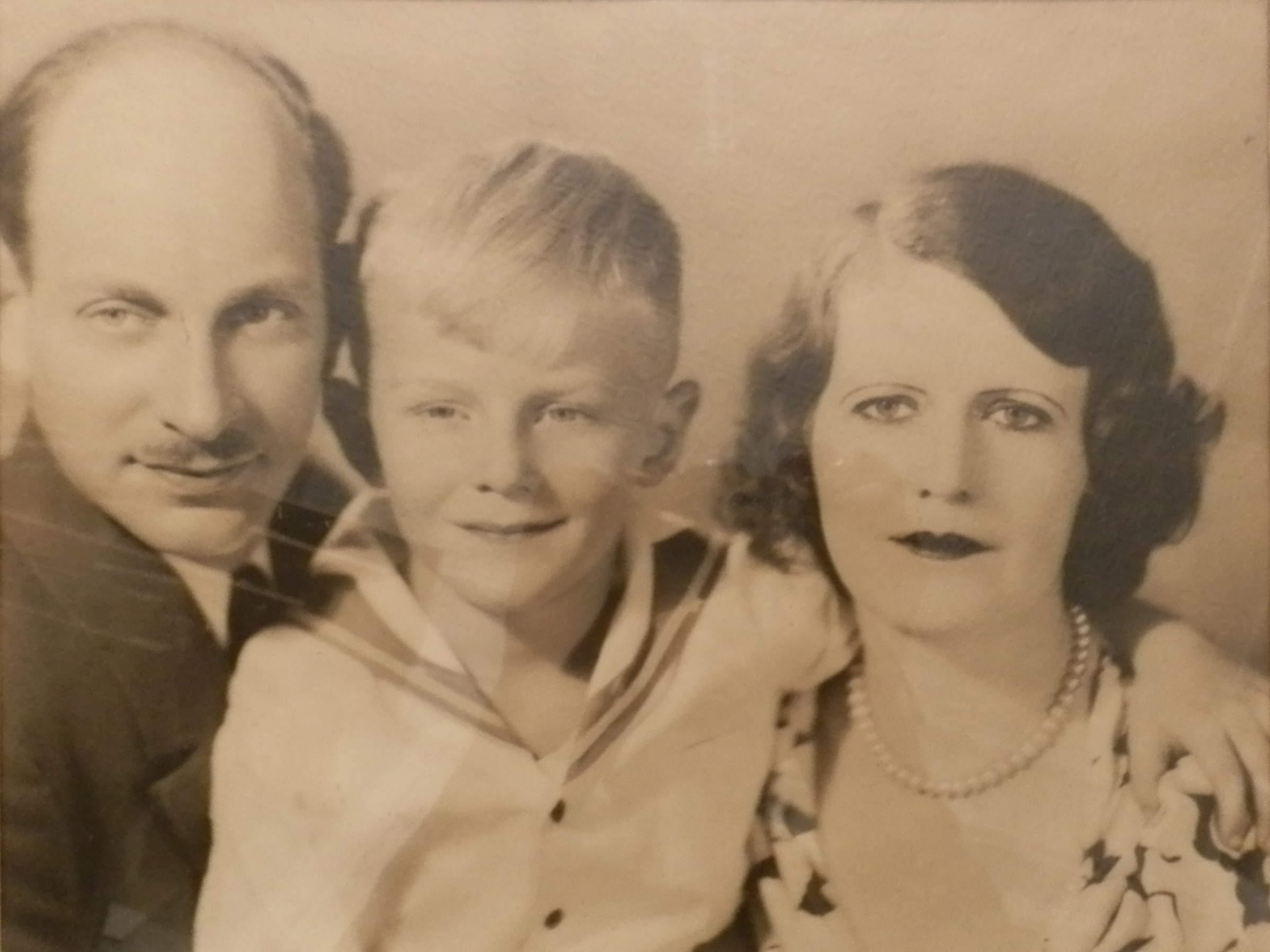
Rudolph C. Flothow with son Rudy and wife Martha

Rudolph C. Flothow (November 23, 1895 - December 21, 1971) was a movie and television producer active from 1915 through the mid-1950s, producing more than 45 films and over 80 television episodes. Most of his productions were crime films for Columbia Pictures, including the 1943 Batman serial, and Crime Doctor, Whistler, Boston Blackie, and Ellery Queen films. He directed the sound sequences in the early sound feature Lucky Boy, starring George Jessel.

== Life and career ==
Flothow was born November 23, 1895, in Frankfurt, Germany, into a mercantile family involved in the China shipping trade, and was apparently a distant relation of the Bavarian composer Friedrich von Flotow. He emigrated to the U.S. in 1914. He married a former model, Martha Tekla Sikorski, the daughter of Polish immigrants, and had one son, Rudy Flothow. His half-brother Wolfgang Hoeffer, a U.S. counterintelligence agent, was found shot to death in the immediate aftermath of Otto John's defection to East Germany.

His earliest involvement in the film industry was in distribution, joining Paramount in 1915. Flothow consistently worked with small budgets, with film shoots typically lasting just 21 days. Flothow had a reputation for delivering a lot of movie for the money, an impression reinforced by Ralph Bellamy's recollection of Flothow as being "always on the set" during the filming of the Ellery Queen films.

In the wake of the film industry's slowdown in the late 1940s, Flothow transitioned into the nascent television market, with the idea of doing for television syndication "...just what he had done before, hard-hitting, low-cost shows, a lot of male-driven action". The result was Ramar of the Jungle, a syndicated television program that reran for decades. The program's African setting had its source in Flothow's longstanding fascination with Africa, crystallizing in a dressing-room conversation with Jon Hall.

Flothow "used a regular stable of heavies. He was actually very fond of these guys with mean faces who were actually very sweet."

He died on December 21, 1971, in Culver City, California.
