= The Whistler (1944 film) =

1944 film by William Castle

- Theatrical release poster
- Directed by: William Castle
- Screenplay by: Eric Taylor
- Based on: The Whistler; 1942-55 radio series by J. Donald Wilson
- Produced by: Rudolph C. Flothow
- Starring: Richard Dix; Gloria Stuart; J. Carrol Naish
- Narrated by: Otto Forrest
- Cinematography: James S. Brown Jr.
- Edited by: Jerome Thoms
- Music by: Wilbur Hatch
- Production company: Larry Darmour Productions
- Distributed by: Columbia Pictures
- Release date: March 30, 1944 (United States)
- Running time: 60 minutes
- Country: United States
- Language: English

The Whistler is a 1944 American mystery film noir directed by William Castle and starring Richard Dix, Gloria Stuart and J. Carrol Naish. Based on the radio drama The Whistler, it was the first of Columbia Pictures' eight "Whistler" films starring Richard Dix produced in the 1940s.

== Plot ==
Industrialist Earl C. Conrad, who failed to rescue his wife at sea and now suffers from grief and guilt, arranges to have a hit man end his life. He does not know how he will be killed, but knows that it will happen within days. Suddenly Conrad learns that his wife is still alive, and he tries to call off the hit. Unfortunately, the underworld go-between who made the deal with him has been killed in the meantime, leaving Conrad unable to learn the identity of the actual hit man.

The pathological hired killer, obsessed with carrying out his mission, stalks Conrad as the frightened industrialist stays on the move. Always looking over his shoulder and trying to think of a way to survive, Conrad keeps running into other dangers, including the vengeance of the dead man's wife.

== Cast ==
- Richard Dix as Earl C. Conrad
- Gloria Stuart as Alice Walker
- J. Carrol Naish as The Killer
- Alan Dinehart as Gorman
- Otto Forrest as the voice of The Whistler (uncredited)
- Joan Woodbury as Antoinette 'Toni' Vigran (uncredited)
- Robert Emmett Keane as Charles 'Charlie' McNear (uncredited)
- Don Costello as Lefty Vigran aka Gorss (uncredited)

== Production ==
William Castle's debut movie Chance of a Lifetime had been poorly received but Harry Cohn decided to give him another chance and assigned the director to The Whistler. Castle had not liked the script for Lifetime but loved The Whistler script.

Castle wrote in his memoirs "I tried every effect I could dream of to create a mood of terror: low key lighting, wide angle lenses to give an eerie feeling and a handheld camera in many of the important scenes to give a sense of reality to the horror." Castle says he also made Dix give up smoking and go on a diet to make the actor more irritable, and keep him waiting on set and force him to redo scenes in order to increase the sense that he was haunted.

Cohn liked the movie although he made several suggestions to improve the film.

== Reception ==
When the film was released, film critic Bosley Crowther panned it, writing, "Such is the miserable expedient to which Richard Dix is reduced in this weary, illogical imitation of an Alfred Hitchcock (plus an early Fritz Lang) film. For an hour or thereabouts he stares and stumbles just out of reach of a relentless J. Carrol Naish, who first has the original intention of frightening Mr. Dix to death. Along that line, the producers might have made a likely serio-comic film, but they change Mr. Naish's mind too quickly and send him—and the picture—in for a real kill. And so we get the routine spectacle of a dragged-out killer-and-victim chase, all very serious and phony—and, consequently, very dull."

More recently, film critic Dennis Schwartz gave the film a more favorable review, writing, "This action-packed one-hour mystery story was the first film in a series spun off from the successful radio program of the '30s and '40s. It starts off with some whistling and a monologue by the unseen Whistler, just as it was done on radio: 'I am the Whistler...and I know many things, for I walk by night.' ... This well-done suspense story continues with the panicky Earl trying to track down the killer to cancel the contract, while the killer thinks he can scare his target to death by just tailing him. The film's theme is that man cannot change his destiny, and if his destiny is to die by murder...that's what it will be. The Whistler states at the end: 'I know because I am the Whistler.' The result is an entertaining B film."

Film critic Leonard Maltin gave it three out of four stars, writing: "[This] tense and moody tale of fate sets the ironic tone for the rest [of the Whistler series]. Naish shines as the principal hit man."

The movie was seen by the King Brothers who hired Castle to make When Strangers Marry (1946).

== Sequels ==
The film was a popular box office attraction and seven sequels were produced over the ensuing four years.

- The Whistler - 1944, directed by William Castle
- The Mark of the Whistler - 1944, directed by William Castle
- The Power of the Whistler – 1945, directed by Lew Landers
- Voice of the Whistler – 1945, directed by William Castle
- Mysterious Intruder – 1946, directed by William Castle
- The Secret of the Whistler – 1946, directed by George Sherman
- The Thirteenth Hour – 1947, directed by William Clemens
- The Return of the Whistler – 1948, directed by D. Ross Lederman

== See also ==
- Tribulations of a Chinaman in China (novel by Jules Verne, 1879)
- Flirting with Fate (1916)
- The Man in Search of His Murderer (1931)
- You Only Live Once (1952)
- Five Days (1954)
- Up to His Ears (1965)
- Tulips (1981)
- I Hired a Contract Killer (1990)
- Bulworth (1998)
- Shut Up and Shoot Me (2005)
