= Eunice Mays Boyd =

American mystery writer (1902-1971)

Eunice Mays Boyd (1902-1971) was an American mystery writer active during the Golden Age of Detective Fiction. Her output was slim at only seven solo novels (with four being published posthumously decades later).

== Biography ==
Boyd was born in Oregon in 1902 to lawyer Edwin Mays and poet Mable Ainsworth. Graduating from the University of California, Berkeley in 1924, she lived in Fairbanks, Alaska for 12 years, before divorcing her husband and settling in Elmwood with her now widowed mother and working for University president Robert Gordon Sproul.

Boyd published three acclaimed mysteries featuring F. Millard Smyth, a mild-mannered Alaskan grocer and amateur sleuth.

Boyd's final work released during her lifetime was the collaborative novel The Marble Forest, written with eleven other authors, including Anthony Boucher and Lenore Glen Offord. Collectively, they were credited as Theo Durrant. The book was adapted as the 1958 film Macabre.

Boyd's goddaughter is Elizabeth Reed Aden, who has also taken up writing. In the 2020s, while clearing up her mother's house for an estate sale, Aden discovered four of Boyd's unpublished manuscripts, which she subsequently set out to be released by Level Best Books. Additionally, Boyd's previous titles are also set to be reprinted.

== Bibliography ==
- The Marble Forest, 1951 (collaborative novel, filmed as Macabre)
- Dune House, 2021 (written circa 1949)
- Slay Bells, 2021 (written circa 1957)
- A Vacation to Kill For, 2023 (written circa 1968-1970)

=== The Alaska Mysteries (F. Millard Smyth series) ===
- Murder Breaks Trail, 1943
- Doom in the Midnight Sun, 1944
- Murder Wears Muklaks, 1945
- One Paw was Red, TBA (written circa 1947)
