= The Return of the Whistler =

1948 film by D. Ross Lederman

- Theatrical release poster
- Directed by: D. Ross Lederman
- Screenplay by: Edward Bock; Maurice Tombragel
- Story by: Cornell Woolrich (short story "All at Once, No Alice")
- Based on: The Whistler; 1942-55 radio series by J. Donald Wilson
- Produced by: Rudolph C. Flothow
- Starring: Michael Duane; Lenore Aubert; Dick Lane
- Narrated by: Otto Forrest
- Cinematography: Philip Tannura
- Edited by: Dwight Caldwell
- Music by: Mischa Bakaleinikoff
- Production company: Larry Darmour Productions
- Distributed by: Columbia Pictures
- Release date: March 18, 1948 (United States)
- Running time: 60 minutes
- Country: United States
- Language: English

The Return of the Whistler is a 1948 American mystery film noir based on the radio drama The Whistler. Directed by D. Ross Lederman, the production features Michael Duane, Lenore Aubert, and Dick Lane. This is the eighth and final entry in Columbia Pictures' "Whistler" series, produced in the 1940s. This was the only film in this series that did not star Richard Dix.

== Plot ==
Ted's (Michael Duane) car breaks down in a small town. He leaves his fiancée Alice (Lenore Aubert) at a hotel while he goes to the next town to get his car fixed. When he returns the next morning, she is missing. He requests to speak with the night clerk who tells him she checked out 30 minutes after he left the night before. He has a slight altercation with the night clerk at which point the police are summoned. The police do not suspect foul play and ask Ted to leave the hotel. When he leaves, a private detective, Gaylord Traynor (Richard Lane) follows him and offers his services to locate Ted's fiancée. On the drive back to the city and Ted's apartment, Ted tells Mr. Traynor the story of how they met and Mr. Traynor implies Ted has been conned. When they arrive at Ted's apartment all of Alice's belongings are still there. Ted gives Mr. Traynor a picture of Alice and finds her marriage certificate. Mr. Traynor knocks out Ted, steals the marriage certificate and leaves. It seems that Mr. Traynor was working for Mr. Barkley to find Alice and retrieve the marriage certificate.

Ted tracks down Alice by her husband's name from the marriage certificate. The husband, Mr. Barkley (James Cardwell) is there (not dead as Alice had claimed to Ted) and tells Ted that Alice has spells where she does not remember who she is and claims she is being held against her will and then escapes. Mr Barkley offers to allow Ted to speak with her so he can hear from her own mouth that she is still married. After Ted leaves, it is clear Alice is being held against her will after all. The people holding her captive were her in-laws. They were holding her captive because she was the heir to the Barkley estate, having inherited it from her husband. The in-laws did not want to lose the estate to Alice.

Ted returns to his apartment still unsettled about Alice's circumstances, but still not being able to prove she is being held against her will. In the glove box of his car he finds her passport. He discovers she has only been in the country, from France, for a few weeks, not the several years Alice's husband asserted. Since Alice was forced into admitting she is married to Mr. Barkley, Ted must prove on his own that Mr. Barkley is lying.

Ted goes back to the Barkley house and is attacked by a dog. The grounds keeper tells Ted the family has left for good and has put Alice in a rest home because her "bad spells" have been getting worse. Ted runs off after finding out the name of the doctor treating her.

Mr. Traynor is still investigating the case and he has found a picture of Alice and her husband, but the man in the picture is not the Mr. Barkley whom Mr. Traynor and Ted have met. Ted goes to the hospital where Alice is being held and finds her just as the in-laws arrive to finish the financials with the doctor. An altercation ensues between Mr. Barkley and Ted when Mr. Traynor arrives with police, exposing the true story.

Ted and Alice are seen in the final scene walking into a wedding chapel together.

== Cast ==
- Michael Duane as Theodore Anthony 'Ted' Nichols
- Lenore Aubert as Alice Dupres Barkley
- Dick Lane as Gaylord Traynor
- James Cardwell as Barkley
- Ann Shoemaker as Mrs. Barkley
- Sarah Padden as Mrs. Hulskamp

== Reception ==
=== Critical response ===
Film critic Dennis Schwartz generally liked the film, and wrote, "D. Ross Lederman (Texas Cyclone/Adventure in Iraq/Two-Fisted Law) skillfully directs the last of the eight entries in Columbia's superior Whistler mystery series, that was based on a popular radio show at the time. It was the only episode without the film's previous star Richard Dix, who retired. Dix's presence is missed. He was not a continuous character, but he added a certain spark to the characters whether as the dubious private detective or villain ... The first half was exciting, but in the second half when we learn what all the mystery means the film loses its power and deadens ... The less than compelling payoff has the engineer tracking his fiance to the asylum and rescuing her with the help of the guilt-ridden private dick, who changes allegiances when he's convinced the family who hired him are criminals."
