= The Whistler (radio series) =

American radio series

The Whistler is an American radio mystery drama which ran from May 16, 1942, until September 22, 1955, on the west-coast regional CBS radio network. The show was also broadcast in Chicago and over Armed Forces Radio. On the West Coast of the United States, it was sponsored by the Signal Oil Company: "That whistle is your signal for the Signal Oil program, The Whistler." There were also two short-lived attempts to form east-coast broadcast spurs: July 3 to September 25, 1946, sponsored by the Campbell Soup Company; and March 26, 1947, to September 29, 1948, sponsored by Household Finance. The program was also adapted into a film noir series by Columbia Pictures in 1944.

== Characters and story ==
I...am the Whistler, and I know many things, for I walk by night. I know many strange tales, many secrets hidden in the hearts of men and women who have stepped into the shadows. Yes... I know the nameless terrors of which they dare not speak!

One opening to The Whistler

Each episode of The Whistler began with the sound of footsteps and a person whistling. (The Saint radio series with Vincent Price used a similar opening.) The haunting signature theme tune was composed by Wilbur Hatch and featured Dorothy Roberts whistling with an orchestra.

A character known only as the Whistler was the host and narrator of the tales, which focused on crime and fate. He often commented directly upon the action in the manner of a Greek chorus, taunting the characters, guilty or innocent, from an omniscient perspective. The stories followed a formula in which a person's criminal acts were typically revealed either by an overlooked but important detail or by the criminal's own stupidity. An ironic ending, often grim, was a key feature of each episode. But on rare occasions, such as "Christmas Bonus" broadcast on Christmas Day 1944, the plot's twist of fate caused the story to end happily for the protagonist.

Bill Forman, a veteran radio announcer, had the title role of the Whistler for the longest period of time. Others who portrayed the Whistler at various times were Gale Gordon, Joseph Kearns, Marvin Miller (announcer for the show, who occasionally filled in for Forman and played supporting roles), and Bill Johnstone (who had the title role on radio's The Shadow from 1938 to 1943). Cast members included Betty Lou Gerson, Hans Conried, Joseph Kearns, Cathy Lewis, Elliott Lewis, Gerald Mohr, Lurene Tuttle and Jack Webb.

Writer-producer J. Donald Wilson established the tone of the show during its first two years, and he was followed in 1944 by producer-director George Allen. Other directors included Sterling Tracy and Sherman Marks with final scripts by Joel Malone and Harold Swanton. Of the 692 episodes, over 200 no longer exist. In 1946, a local Chicago version of The Whistler with local actors (including Everett Clarke as the Whistler) aired Sundays on WBBM, sponsored by Meister Brau beer.

== Parallel productions ==
In March 1948, conflict between two sponsors led to CBS's broadcasting of two versions of The Whistler concurrently. Signal Oil sponsored the program from the Rocky Mountains westward, and Household Finance was the sponsor in the eastern half of the United States. The trade publication Variety reported, "When the two clients couldn't agree on how the script should be treated, CBS stepped in and ordered two different yarns and an entire new production setup for each sponsor." The resulting change created the following structures:

Parallel Productions of The Whistler in 1948
Position	West Version	East Version
Star	Bill Forman	Bill Johnstone
Director	George Allen	William N. Robson
Music Director	Wilbur Hatch	Lud Gluskin

== Films and television ==
=== Films ===
The Whistler was adapted into a film noir series of eight films by Columbia Pictures. The "Voice of the Whistler" was provided by an uncredited Otto Forrest. In the first seven films, veteran actor Richard Dix played the main character in the story – a different character in each film, ranging from mild-mannered sympathetic heroes to flawed and forceful villains. In the eighth film, made after Dix's retirement, Michael Duane played the main character.

- The Whistler – 1944, directed by William Castle
- The Mark of the Whistler – 1944, directed by William Castle
- The Power of the Whistler – 1945, directed by Lew Landers
- Voice of the Whistler – 1945, directed by William Castle
- Mysterious Intruder – 1946, directed by William Castle
- The Secret of the Whistler – 1946, directed by George Sherman
- The Thirteenth Hour – 1947, directed by William Clemens
- The Return of the Whistler – 1948, directed by D. Ross Lederman

=== Television ===
A syndicated TV version of The Whistler was produced and aired for a brief period in 1954. Bill Forman, the most frequently employed radio voice of the show's title character, reprised that role on TV.

=== Cultural references ===
On April 21, 1964, the show was parodied on an episode of The Jack Benny Program entitled "I Am the Fiddler," an expanded reboot of an earlier, like-named, audio-only Benny parody, which aired during the October 20, 1946 episode of his radio show.

In the 1990 film The Two Jakes, set in Los Angeles in the late 1940s, the opening narrative of The Whistler can be heard on the car radio as private detective J.J. Gittes (played by Jack Nicholson) cruises the streets.

== See also ==
- Audio theatre
- The Mysterious Traveler
- Old-time radio
