= It's a Small World (1950 film) =

1950 film

- Directed by: William Castle
- Written by: William Castle; Otto Schreiber
- Produced by: Peter Scully
- Cinematography: Karl Struss
- Edited by: Peter Sullivan
- Music by: Karl Hajos
- Distributed by: Eagle-Lion Films
- Release date: 1950 (United States)
- Running time: 69 minutes
- Country: United States
- Language: English

It's a Small World is a 1950 American film directed by William Castle.

== Plot ==
Throughout his life, Harry faces the limitations of being a small person. He is reduced to carnival or shoe-shining jobs until a young pickpocket woman introduces him to criminal activity.

== Cast ==
- Paul Dale as Harry Musk
- Lorraine Miller as Buttons
- Will Geer as William Musk – Father
- Nina Koshetz as Rose Ferris
- Steve Brodie as Charlie
- Anne Sholter as Dolly Burke
- Todd Karns as Sam
- Margaret Field as Janie at Age 16
- Shirley Mills as Susan Musk at Age 16 (as Shirley O. Mills)
- Thomas Browne Henry as Jackson (as Tom Brown Henry)
- Harry Harvey as Town Doctor
- Paul E. Burns as Italian Truck Farmer
- Jacqui Snyder as Susan Musk at Age 8
- Lora Lee Michel as Janie at Age 8

== Production ==
Producer Peter Scully and director William Castle launched a global search for midget actors, resulting in the receipt of 300 inquiries and the casting of Paul Dale and Anne Sholter. The midgets were consulted as technical advisers and helped provide perspectives on challenges commonly faced by midgets in their relations with taller people. Castle was careful to avoid exploitation of the midgets, saying: "We never mention the word 'freak'. We show midgets as human beings. We show the problems they face as people, not monstrosities."

Production of the film was conducted in secrecy and began in early November 1949, completed by the end of the month.

The film's budget was slightly more than $100,000 and was financed by a $50,000 loan that Scully and Castle obtained from friends.

Scully and Castle had planned a series of three films starring Dale, with the next feature to be titled "One in a Million", but the projects did not materialize and Dale never appeared in another feature film.

== Reception ==
Although the film was first screened in select cities in May 1950, it was not released in New York until 1951 and in Los Angeles until 1952.

In a contemporary review for the Los Angeles Daily News, critic Ezra Goodman wrote: "Though rather awkwardly and melodramatically developed, the picture is sufficiently honest and far enough off the beaten motion picture path to command audience."

Reviewer Reed Porter of the Los Angeles Mirror called the film "an unusual and fascinating off-beat screen achievement, well acted".

== Home media ==
The film was released on DVD in 2010.
