= Dark Venture =

American radio anthology thriller series (1945-1947

Dark Venture is an American radio anthology thriller series that was broadcast on ABC's West Coast network beginning on May 30, 1945. It was moved to the full ABC network on February 19, 1946, and remained there until it ended on February 10, 1947. It was created by director Leonard Reeg and producer J. Donald Wilson. John Lake narrated the show.

== Overview ==
Dark Venture originated at the ABC's KECA facilities in Los Angeles. The series ran for 52 episodes between February 1946 and February 1947. ABC took Dark Venture series nationwide on February 19, 1946.

The first episode of Dark Venture began with an introduction by Lake:

“Over the minds of mortal men come many shadows… shadows of greed and hate, jealousy and fear. Darkness is absence of light… so in the sudden shadows which fog the minds of men and are to be found in the strange impulses which urge them on to their venture…in the dark.”

The introduction had subtle changes in different episodes to reflect the journeying into the unknown.

The stories on Dark Venture gave the listener the murderer's point of view. The episodes were an adventure of a distorted reality where people were scheming ways to kill someone and try to get away with it. The killers had no sense of right or wrong and nothing would get in their way. Victims were usually killed by strangulation, knifing, or shooting.

Killers devised cruel mind games such as tricking a wife into believing she was going insane, or manipulating a business associate into thinking he was being stalked by a lover who did not exist. Both of these elaborate plots were thought up to provide a scapegoat for the murderer. However, small details that they forgot to cover ultimately unraveled their evil plan at the end of each episode.

Actors who appeared on the series included Bill Johnstone, Dwight Hauser, and Betty Moran.

Episodes included "A Simple Case of Murder" on July 2, 1946.

== Production ==
Dark Venture was broadcast on ABC's West Coast network before it was extended to the full ABC network. The series was created by Wilson. Reeg was the director, and Larry Marcus was the writer. Harry Walstrom was the commercial spokesman, and Dean Fossler provided music. Wildroot Cream-Oil was the sponsor.

After Dark Venture joined the full ABC network, two shows were performed each week. The episode broadcast to the eastern half of the United States had music from an orchestra; an organ provided music for the one that the western half of the country heard. The story had to be cut by three minutes for the West to allow time for commercials that were not used in the East.

== Television ==
Bell International attempted a television version of Dark Venture in 1949. The project apparently did not go beyond filming a pilot.
