= Lawrence B. Marcus =

American screenwriter

- Born: July 19, 1917; Beaver, Utah, U.S.
- Died: August 28, 2001 (aged 84); Woodland Hills, California, U.S.
- Education: New York University
- Occupation: Screenwriter
- Spouse: Viva Knight
- Children: 1

Lawrence B. Marcus (July 19, 1917 – August 28, 2001) was an American screenwriter. He was nominated for an Academy Award in the category Best Adapted Screenplay for the film The Stunt Man.

Marcus worked on newspapers in Illinois, Massachusetts, and Ohio before he took a class in writing for radio at the University of Chicago. After the establishment of the Federal Writers' Project, he was appointed to head the Illinois division's radio department. He also served in the United States Army Air Forces. His assignment there was to write radio programs that would increase enlistments.

Marcus's work on radio included writing Dark Venture.

== Personal life and death ==
Marcus was married, and they had a son. Marcus died in August 2001 of Parkinson's disease at the Motion Picture & Television Fund cottages in Woodland Hills, California, at the age of 84.

== Selected filmography ==
- Backfire (1950)
- Dark City (1950)
- Cause for Alarm! (1951; based on his radio work)
- Paula (1952)
- The Bigamist (1953)
- The Unguarded Moment (1956)
- Witness for the Prosecution (1957)
- Diamond Safari (1958)
- Voice in the Mirror (1958)
- Brainstorm (1965)
- A Covenant with Death (1967)
- Petulia (1968)
- Justine (1969)
- Going Home (1971)
- Alex & the Gypsy (1976)
- The Stunt Man (1980; co-nominated with Richard Rush)
