= The Tingler =

1959 horror film

- Pressbook ad for The Tingler
- Directed by: William Castle
- Written by: Robb White
- Produced by: William Castle
- Starring: Vincent Price; Judith Evelyn
- Cinematography: Wilfred M. Cline
- Edited by: Chester W. Schaeffer
- Music by: Von Dexter
- Color process: Black and white
- Production company: William Castle Productions
- Distributed by: Columbia Pictures
- Release date: July 29, 1959
- Running time: 82 minutes
- Country: United States
- Language: English
- Budget: $400,000

The Tingler is a 1959 American horror film produced and directed by William Castle. It is the third of five collaborations between Castle and writer Robb White, and starring Vincent Price.

The film tells the story of a scientist who discovers a parasite in human beings, called a "tingler", which feeds on fear. The creature earned its name by making the spine of its host "tingle" when the host is frightened. In line with other Castle horror films, including Macabre (1958) and House on Haunted Hill (1959), Castle used gimmicks to sell the film. The Tingler remains most well known for a gimmick called "Percepto!", a vibrating device, in some of the theater chairs, which the onscreen action activated.

Released in the United States on July 19, 1959, The Tingler received mixed reviews, but has since gone through some critical reevaluation and is now considered a camp cult film.

A sequel novel, The Tingler Unleashed (ISBN 979-8988682349), written by Gary J. Rose, was published in August 2023 as "a contemporary reimagining that pays homage to the 1959 cinematic masterpiece by William Castle", taking place and continuing the events of the original film fifty years later; an unabridged audiobook recording of the novel was released on October 16, 2023.

== Plot ==
A pathologist, Dr. Warren Chapin, discovers that the tingling of the spine in states of extreme fear is due to the growth of a creature that every human being seems to have, called a "tingler," a parasite attached to the human spine. It curls up, feeds, and grows stronger when its host is afraid, effectively crushing the person's spine if curled up long enough. The host can weaken the creature and stop its curling by screaming.

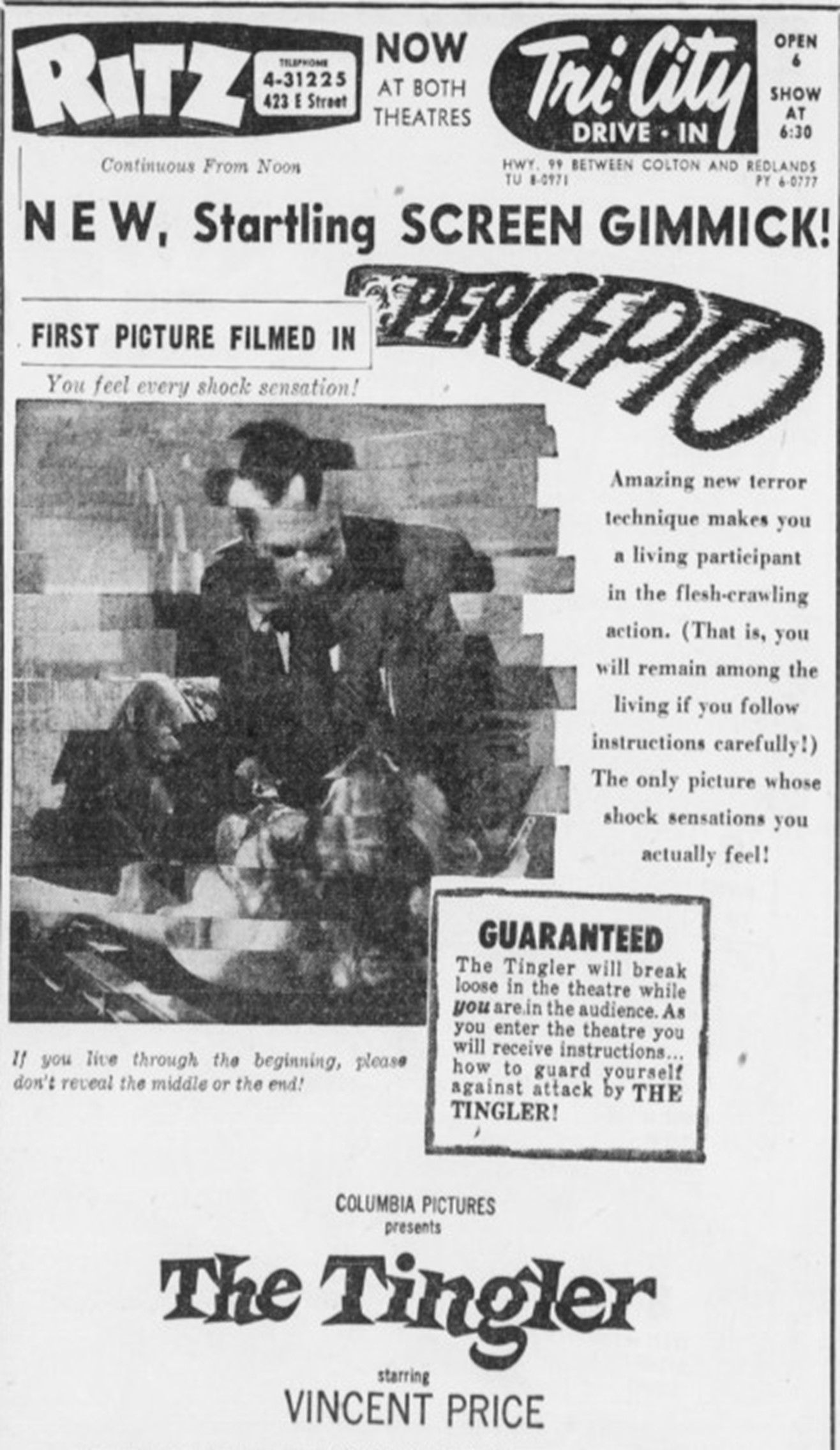
Advertisement from 1959

Movie theater owner Oliver Higgins, who shows exclusively silent films, is an acquaintance of Dr. Chapin. Higgins' wife, Martha, is deaf and mute and therefore cannot scream. She becomes quite nervous even at the sight of blood, which triggers her nervousness when Warren accidentally pricks himself. It gives Chapin the idea that she may very well be likely to have a visible Tingler to examine in her due to her inability to scream. He keeps this in mind while returning to his wife Isabel, who he lives with along with her sister Lucy. While Warren and Isabel have a rocky marriage because she is unfaithful, he uses her for a test of his theory about the Tingler by frightening her into believing he will shoot her dead. When he shoots her, she faints, which gives Warren the chance to X-ray her spine that reveals the form of the Tingler, which resembles a centipede.

Later on, David presents Warren with a new drug that apparently has a significant effect on the nervous system: LSD. Warren tries out the drug to induce fear in himself, although eventually is compelled to scream. After he recovers, he goes to the movie theater to look at Martha and her nervousness. He gives her an injection while telling Higgins about a prescription for barbiturates. Later that night, Higgins starts to see weird, apparently supernatural events appear in her room. She dies of fright. During her autopsy, Chapin removes a tingler from her spine. Isabel tries to use the creature to kill Warren by letting it out but Lucy, arriving home at the same time the creature is at the neck of Warren, screams, which stops the Tingler from moving, although it is established that it cannot be killed by conventional methods, which suggests that the death of the person leads to the demise of the Tingler in it. Chapin plans to not reveal the Tingler to the scientific public and instead wishes to put the Tingler back in the body of Martha.

After they contain the tingler and return to Higgins' house, it is revealed that Higgins is the murderer; he frightened his wife to death, knowing that she could not scream because she was mute. The centipede-like creature eventually breaks free from the container that held it and is released into the theater below the house. The tingler latches onto a woman's leg, and she screams until it releases its grip. Chapin controls the situation by shutting off the lights and telling everyone in the theater to scream. When the tingler has left the theater, they resume the movie and go to the projection room, where they find the tingler and capture it.

Guessing that the only way to neutralize the tingler is to reinsert it inside Martha's body, Chapin does so. After he leaves, Higgins, who has admitted his guilt to Chapin, is alone in the room. As if by supernatural forces, the door slams shut and locks itself, and the window closes, echoing what happened just before Martha was frightened to death. The tingler causes the body of Martha to rise from the bed, staring at her husband. Higgins is so terrified that he is unable to scream. The screen fades, and Dr. Chapin's voice says, "Ladies and gentlemen, just a word of warning. If any of you are not convinced that you have a tingler of your own, the next time you are frightened in the dark... don't scream."

=== Film prologue ===
In a similar manner as Universal's Frankenstein (1931), Castle opened the film with an on-screen warning to the audience:

I am William Castle, the director of the motion picture you are about to see. I feel obligated to warn you that some of the sensations—some of the physical reactions which the actors on the screen will feel—will also be experienced, for the first time in motion picture history, by certain members of this audience. I say 'certain members' because some people are more sensitive to these mysterious electronic impulses than others. These unfortunate, sensitive people will at times feel a strange, tingling sensation; other people will feel it less strongly. But don't be alarmed—you can protect yourself. At any time you are conscious of a tingling sensation, you may obtain immediate relief by screaming. Don't be embarrassed about opening your mouth and letting rip with all you've got, because the person in the seat right next to you will probably be screaming too. And remember this—a scream at the right time may save your life.

== Cast ==
- Vincent Price as Dr. Warren Chapin
- Judith Evelyn as Mrs. Martha Ryerson Higgins
- Darryl Hickman as Dave Morris
- Patricia Cutts as Isabel Stevens Chapin
- Pamela Lincoln as Lucy Stevens
- Philip Coolidge as Oliver 'Ollie' Higgins

== Production ==
After the financial success of House on Haunted Hill, Castle moved his independent production unit from Allied Artists to Columbia to produce The Tingler. Price was on board again, with Hickman playing his assistant and newcomer Lincoln playing his sister-in-law. Cutts played Price's unfaithful wife Isabel. The Tingler was Price's second and final film with Castle and the fifth performance that would ultimately brand him as "The Master of Menace".

Castle convinced Hickman, who was Lincoln's real-life fiancé, to join the cast as her fiancé in the film. At first Hickman declined, but agreed after Castle convinced him it would help Lincoln's career. According to Hickman, Castle did such a good job of convincing him it would help Lincoln that he worked for no salary. Hickman, who was 5'10", was required to wear lifts for the scenes with 6'4" Vincent Price to offset the disparity of their heights.

Evelyn was hired at the request of Price, who had worked with her on Broadway. She also received attention in another prominent "non-speaking role" as the suicidal "Miss Lonelyhearts" in Hitchcock's Rear Window (1954). Dal McKennon, the projectionist (uncredited in the film), had a successful career as the voice of many screen and TV characters, including "Buzz Buzzard" in the Woody Woodpecker cartoons and "Gumby" in the TV clay animation series. Jack Dusick, make-up artist for The Tingler, was the father of singer/actress Michele Lee.

White, the story author, was partly inspired by his encounter with a centipede while living in the British Virgin Islands.

White had experimented with LSD at UCLA after hearing about it from Aldous Huxley and decided to work it into the script. It is the first depiction of LSD use in a major motion picture. At the time, the drug was legal. The title of the book that Vincent Price's character reads before taking LSD—Fright Effects Induced by Injection of Lysergic Acid LSD25—is printed on the back of the book, not the front. This was done for a better shot of the expositional title of the book, explaining the effects of LSD to the audience.

Location shots were filmed at the Columbia Ranch in Burbank, California.

The movie playing in the theater when the tingler escapes was the 1921 silent film Tol'able David.

== Analysis ==
A subplot of the film involves the fates of a movie theater specializing in silent films and its owners. According to Kevin Heffernan, this reflects the conditions of the movie theater industry in the late 1950s. There were many discount theaters trying to establish their own market niche by showing older films. For the owners of these small theaters, it was a thankless and poorly paid job, as described in the trade journals of this period. When Ollie describes at length the work load involved in cleaning the building, he echoes real-life complaints. This provides the motive for his murder, as he is trying to escape a hopeless life.

Another subplot involves dysfunctional married lives. Most prominent is that of Warren to Isabelle, who is clearly unfaithful to him. She stays out until the early hours of the morning and is seen giving her lover a farewell kiss. In another scene, Warren enters through the front door of his house and hears the back door slam. He then discovers two used glasses of wine and a forgotten tie clip. In an argument between them, she does not deny her unfaithfulness, but counters by accusing her husband of neglecting her. While spending so many hours in his laboratory, he has lost contact with living people, leaving her no choice but to seek human affection elsewhere. The marriage of Ollie and Martha is also an unhappy one. He claims that Martha would have killed him if she could.

Martha is depicted as a woman with a whole range of obsessive and phobic traits. Tim Lucas has described her as a silent film character in a sound film. The idea of a terrified, mute woman was not fully original. According to Heffernan, it was probably inspired by The Spiral Staircase (1946).

The scene with the LSD trip offers a display of "stylized and exaggerated performance". The eyes of Warren shift from side to side, gazing suspiciously at his environment, while describing feelings of unease and apprehension. He loosens his tie, when he thinks himself unable to breathe. He opens a window while insisting that it is nailed shut. He sees a hanging skeleton as a moving figure, and describes the walls of the room as closing in on him. Finally he visibly struggles with the urge to scream, and succumbs to it.

== Gimmicks ==
William Castle was known for his movie gimmicks, and The Tingler featured one of his best: "Percepto!". Previously, he had offered a $1,000 life insurance policy against "Death by Fright" for Macabre (1958) and sent a skeleton flying above the audiences' heads in the auditorium in House on Haunted Hill (1959). The gimmicks for The Tingler increased the film's cost from $400,000 to $1 million.

=== Percepto: "Scream for your lives!" ===
"Percepto!" was a gimmick where Castle attached electrical "buzzers" to the underside of some seats in theaters where The Tingler was screened to provide "tingling" sensations during certain scenes. The buzzers were small surplus airplane wing deicing motors left from World War II. The cost of this equipment added $250,000 to the film's budget. It was used predominantly in larger theaters. The prologue claimed some people might not be susceptible to the "tingling" to take account that not all seats were wired.

During the climax of the film, The Tingler was unleashed in the movie theater, while the audience watched a climactic fight scene in Tol'able David (1921). The film stops and, in some real-life theaters, the house lights came on, a woman screamed and pretended to faint and was then taken away in a stretcher; all part of the show arranged by Castle. From the screen, the voice of Price mentioned the fainted lady and asked the rest of the audience to remain seated. The film-within-a-film resumed and was interrupted again. The projected film appeared to break as the silhouette of the tingler moved across the projection beam. The image of the film went dark, all lights in the auditorium (except fire exit signs) went off, and Price's voice warned the audience, "Ladies and gentlemen, please do not panic. But scream! Scream for your lives! The tingler is loose in this theater!" This cued the theater projectionist to activate the Percepto! buzzers, giving some audience members an unexpected jolt, followed by a highly visible physical reaction. The voices of scared patrons were heard from the screen, replaced by the voice of Price, who explained that the tingler was paralyzed and the danger was over. At this point, the film resumed its normal format, which was used for its epilogue.

An alternate warning was recorded for drive-in theaters; this warning advised the audience the tingler was loose in the drive-in. Castle's voice was substituted for Price's in this version.

Castle's autobiography, Step Right Up!: I'm Gonna Scare the Pants off America, erroneously stated that "Percepto!" delivered electric shocks to the theater seats.

In the 1980 book The Golden Turkey Awards by Harry and Michael Medved, Percepto won the award for "The Most Inane and Unwelcome 'Technical Advance" in Hollywood History".

Two Joe Dante films contain scenes which reference the "Percepto!" gimmick: Gremlins 2: The New Batch (1990) and Matinee (1993).

=== Fainting customers and medical assistance ===
To enhance the climax even more, Castle hired fake "screamers and fainters" planted in the audience. There were fake nurses stationed in the foyer and an ambulance outside of the theater. The "fainters" would be carried out on a gurney and whisked away in the ambulance, to return for the next showing.

=== "Bloody Bathtub" scene ===
Although The Tingler was filmed in black-and-white, a short color sequence was spliced into the film. It showed a sink (in black-and-white) with bright-red "blood" flowing from the taps and a black-and-white Evelyn watching a bloody red hand rising from a bathtub, likewise filled with the bright red "blood". Castle used color film for the effect. The scene was accomplished by painting the set white, black and gray and applying gray makeup to the actress to simulate monochrome.

== Release ==
Test engagements started in Detroit on August 5, 1959, with further engagements in Boston, Baltimore and San Francisco.

== Reception ==
Contemporary reviews of The Tingler were mixed. Shortly after the film's release, Howard Thompson of The New York Times said, "William Castle has been serving some of the worst, dullest little horror entries ever to snake into movie houses". In his August 1959 appraisal of the picture, "Ron" of Variety disagreed with Thompson, calling it "highly entertaining" and characterizing "Percepto" as "effective, not so much because of the 'tingle' but because it 'menacingly' moves closer and closer in waves and, coupled with a whirring noise and sound-track heartbeats and screams, puts the filmgoer in the midst of the horror."

In the decades after its initial release, the film has been praised by some other reviewers for its sheer camp qualities. Time Out London in its 2005 review regarded the screenplay as "ingeniously ludicrous",

Later, writing on behalf of Slant Magazine in 2009, Chuck Bowen said, "Ludicrousness aside, Tingler is still one of the more confident Castle pictures: a well paced, at times intentionally, funny parody of 1950s domestication, with every couple in the story trying to off one another for a variety of amusingly convoluted reasons. Think Burn After Reading with dime store production values and a plastic spinal cord at its center."

Dread Central called the film Castle's "magnum opus", while Nerdist singled out Price's performance, saying, "Vincent Price is typically great and as always commits himself fully to the proceedings, even if it’s utterly absurd."

American film director John Waters included The Tingler in a list of his favorite films.

== Home media ==
Sony Pictures Home Entertainment released the film on DVD for its 40th anniversary in 1999. The film was later included on the William Castle Film Collection DVD set, released on October 20, 2009.

Scream Factory (under Sony license) released a Blu-ray edition of the film in August 2018.

Shown on the MeTV show Svengoolie on October 15, 2022.

== See also ==
- List of American films of 1959
- List of films featuring hallucinogens

== Sources ==
- Brottman, Mikita (2004). "Ritual, Tension, and Relief: The Terror or The Tingler". In Grant, Barry Keith; Sharrett, Christopher (eds.). Planks of Reason: Essays on the Horror Film. Scarecrow Press. ISBN 978-0-810850132.
- Browne, Pat (2001). The Guide to United States Popular Culture. Popular Press. ISBN 0-87972-821-3.
- Castle, William (1976). Step Right Up!: I'm Gonna Scare the Pants off America. New York: Putnam. ISBN 978-0-578066820.
- Heffernan, Kevin (2004). "'A Sissified Bela Lugosi': Vincent Price, William Castle, and AIP's Poe Adaptations". Ghouls, Gimmicks, and Gold: Horror Films and the American Movie Business, 1953–1968. Duke University Press. ISBN 978-0-822332152.
