= The Secret of the Whistler =

1946 film by George Sherman

- Theatrical release poster
- Directed by: George Sherman
- Screenplay by: Richard H. Landau; Raymond L. Schrock
- Based on: The Whistler; 1942-55 radio series by J. Donald Wilson
- Produced by: Rudolph C. Flothow
- Starring: Richard Dix; Leslie Brooks; Michael Duane
- Narrated by: Otto Forrest
- Cinematography: Allen G. Siegler
- Edited by: Dwight Caldwell
- Music by: Herschel Burke Gilbert
- Production company: Larry Darmour Productions
- Distributed by: Columbia Pictures
- Release date: November 7, 1946 (United States)
- Running time: 65 minutes
- Country: United States
- Language: English

The Secret of the Whistler is a 1946 American mystery film noir based on the radio drama The Whistler. Directed by George Sherman, the production features Richard Dix, Leslie Brooks and Michael Duane. It is the sixth of Columbia Pictures' eight "Whistler" films produced in the 1940s, all but the last starring Dix.

== Plot ==
Ralph Harrison (Richard Dix) is married to Edith (Mary Currier), a rich woman who has been suffering heart attacks. Upset by her condition, he finds consoling companionship with an artist's model, the unscrupulous gold-digger Kay (Leslie Brooks).

He falls in love with Kay. Edith's health then improves. Edith overhears Ralph professing his love for Kay. Edith threatens Ralph, saying she'll take him out of her will. He decides to poison her, with her own medicine, before she can meet with her lawyers.

After Edith dies, Ralph marries Kay, who becomes suspicious of how Edith died and worried for her own fate. Finding incriminating diary pages and the medicine, she has the medicine analyzed, discovering that it was poisoned.

Ralph overhears Kay's phone conversation with the lab. Pretending to embrace her, he strangles her to death, just as the police arrive and arrest him for murder - but not for the murder of Edith, because she had not taken the poisoned medicine but died of a heart attack.

== Cast ==
- Richard Dix as Ralph Harrison
- Leslie Brooks as Kay Morrell
- Michael Duane as Artist Jim Calhoun
- Mary Currier as Edith Marie Harrison
- Mona Barrie as Linda Vail
- Ray Walker as Joseph Aloysius 'Joe' Conroy
- Claire Du Brey as Laura - Harrison's Servant
- Otto Forrest as The Whistler

== Reception ==
TV Guide rated it 3/5 stars and called it "engrossing as usual and well acted".
