= Nina Vale =

American actress

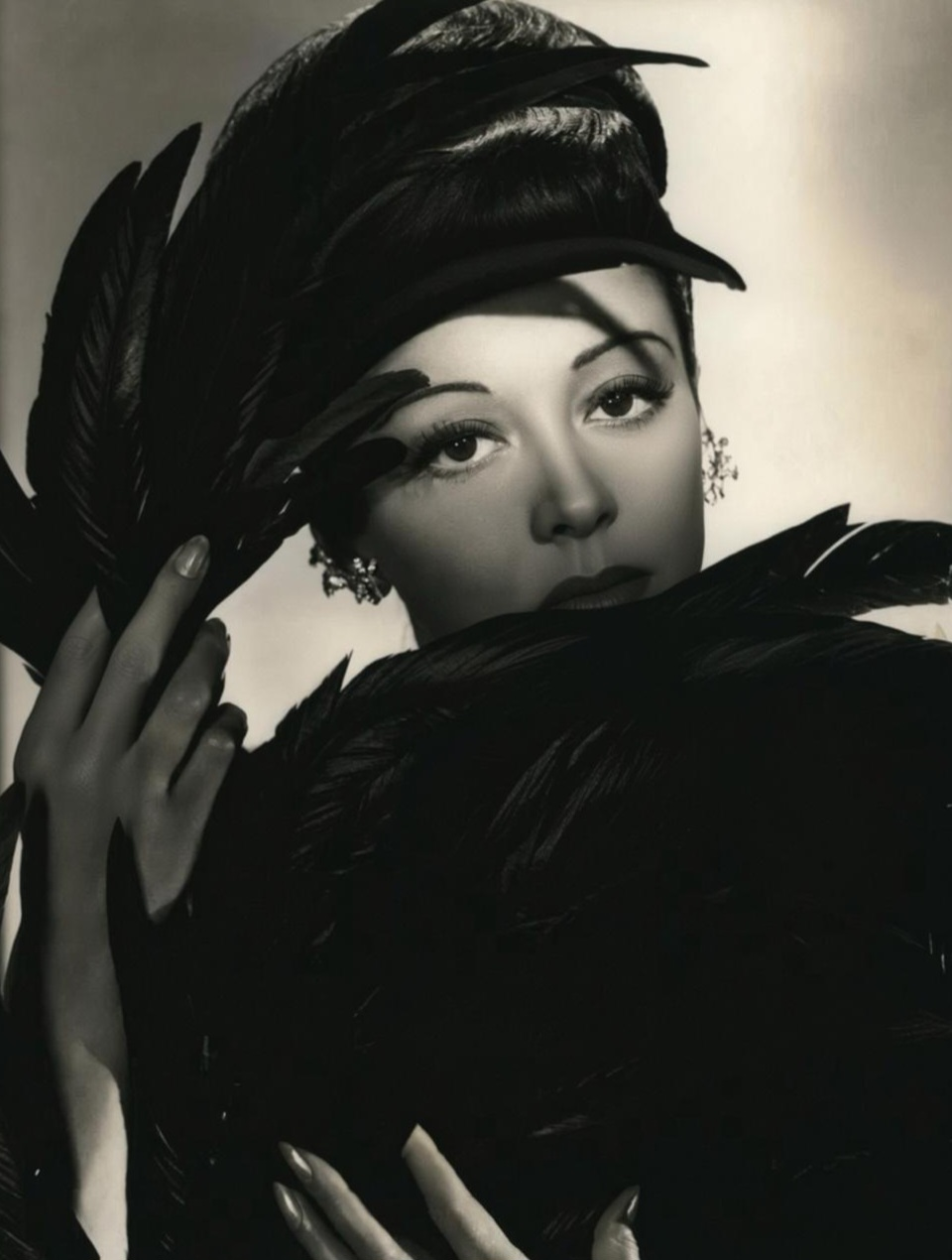
- Vale in 1945
- Born: Anne Bradshaw Hunter; August 12, 1918; Cambridge, Massachusetts, U.S.
- Died: January 30, 1964 (aged 45); Arlington, Massachusetts, U.S.
- Occupations: Actress, dancer
- Years active: 1941–1959

Anne Bradshaw Hunter (August 12, 1918 – January 30, 1964), billed alternately as Anne Hunter, Ann Hunter, or Nina Vale was an American actress and dancer, who had three leading roles in films of the 1940s, most notably in the 1945 noir, Cornered, opposite erstwhile crooner turned private eye/tough guy Dick Powell.

== Early years ==
Born Anne Bradshaw Hunter in Cambridge, Massachusetts, and raised in nearby Arlington, Vail was one of four daghters born to Nova Scotia natives Bertha Jean (née Bradshaw) and Clarence David Hunter.

Because her parents objected to her desire to become an actress, she left home in her teenage years and went to New York City.

== Stage ==
Vale was a dramatics student of Benno Schneider in New York. Her work on stage there included acting in The Women. Later, she played a Russian sniper in a road-show production of Doughgirls. In 1948, she was in Joy to the World in New Haven, Connecticut. In 1949, she co-starred in a production of the comedy Reunion in Vienna.

In 1959, she was billed as Anne Hunter in a performance of Passion, Poison, and Petrifaction.

== Film ==
Vale's first film was The Gay Falcon for RKO Pictures.

== Dance ==
In New York, Vale danced in The Girl from Wyoming and was featured in a New Faces revue. She also danced in a Los Angeles production of the operetta Bittersweet.

== Death ==
Vale died, aged 45, on January 30, 1965, in Arlington, Massachusetts. Although no survivors are mentioned in the brief New York Times funeral announcement, she did predecease both her mother and at least two sisters.

== Filmography ==
Year	Title	Role	Notes
1941	The Gay Falcon	Elinor Benford	(as Anne Hunter)
1942	One Dangerous Night	Coatroom Girl	(uncredited)
1943	Hi Diddle Diddle	Sandra	(as Ann Hunter)
1945	Keep Your Powder Dry	WAC	(uncredited)
1945	A Royal Scandal	Lady in Waiting	(uncredited)
1945	Week-End at the Waldorf	Information Desk Attendant	(uncredited)
1945	Cornered	Señora Camargo	
1946	Mysterious Intruder	Joan Hill - Gale's Secretary	(final credited film role)
1950	A Life of Her Own	Miss Lamson	(uncredited)
1957	Alfred Hitchcock Presents; Ep. "Reward to Finder"	Saleslady	(as Ann Hunter)
1959	Deadline; Ep. "Lonely Hearts Killer"	Marie	(as Ann Hunter; final screen role)
