= The Adventures of Bill Lance =

Radio crime drama between 1944 and 1948

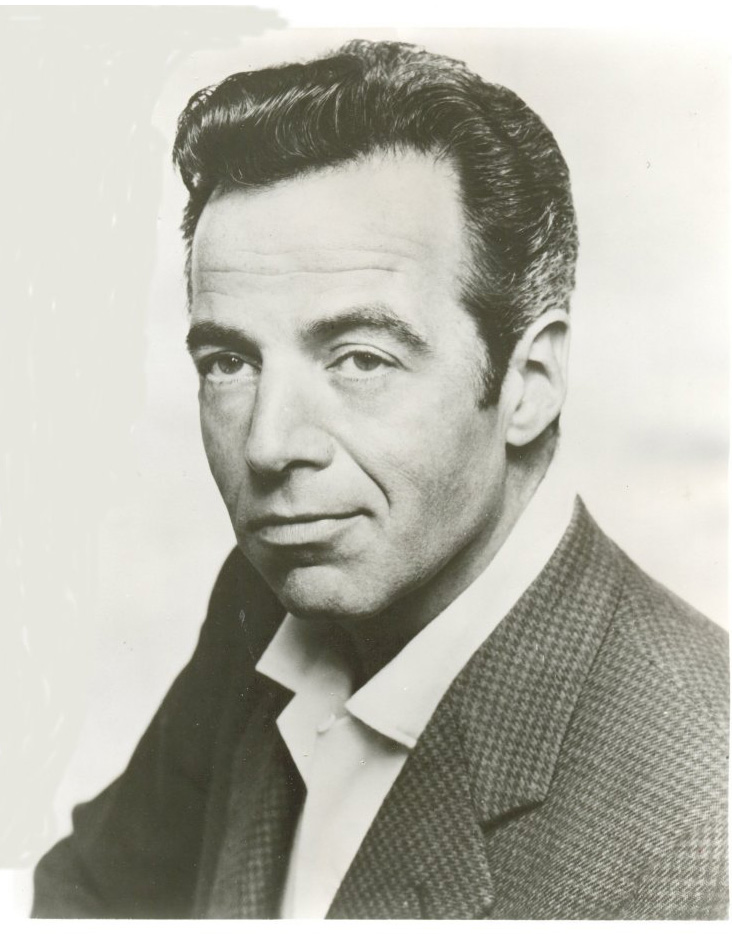
- Gerald Mohr played Bill Lance in the 1947-1948 version of the program.
- Genre: Detective drama
- Running time: 30 minutes
- Country of origin: United States
- Language(s): English
- Syndicates: CBS West Coast (1944-1945); ABC (1947-1948)
- Starring: John McIntire; Pat McGeehan; Gerald Mohr
- Announcer: Dick Joy; Owen James
- Created by: J. Donald Wilson
- Written by: J. Donald Wilson; Stewart Sterling; Sylvia Richards; Maurice Zimm; Martha Chapin
- Directed by: Mel Williamson
- Original release: April 23, 1944 – January 4, 1948
- Sponsored by: Planters Peanuts

The Adventures of Bill Lance is a 30-minute American radio crime drama, created by J. Donald Wilson, which aired on a regional network from April 23, 1944, until September 9, 1945, and on a national network from June 14, 1947, to January 4, 1948.

Initially heard on CBS West Coast Sundays at 9 p.m., the series began April 23, 1944, with John McIntire as Bill Lance, a detective who traveled to exotic locales. Pat McGeehan took over the role the following March until the series ended September 9, 1945. Howard McNear played Lance's pal, Ulysses Higgins. Others in the cast included Mercedes McCambridge, Cathy Lewis, Joseph Kearns and Frank Graham. The announcers were Dick Joy and Owen James. Milton Charles supplied the music. The program was sponsored by Planters peanuts.

With Gerald Mohr in the title role, the series returned on ABC June 14, 1947 (the first time it was broadcast nationwide), airing Saturdays at 9pm until August, then Mondays at 9 p.m. until September, then Sundays at 5 p.m. Produced by Dwight Hauser, with music by organist Rex Koury, this series ran until January 4, 1948.
