= William Castle =

American filmmaker (1914–1977)

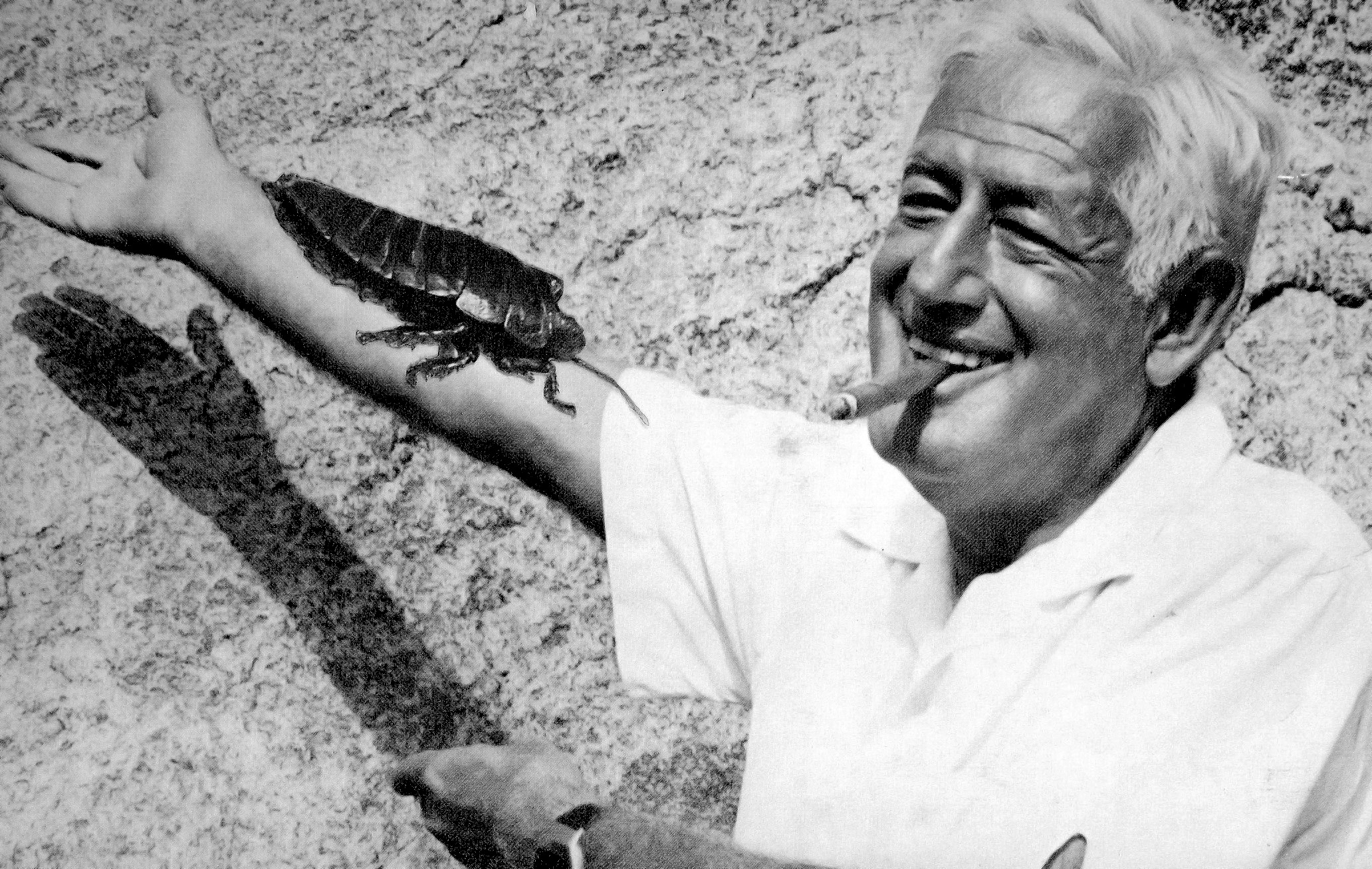
- Castle with a fake cockroach, c. 1974–1975
- Born: William Schloss Jr. April 24, 1914; New York City, New York, U.S.
- Died: May 31, 1977 (aged 63); Los Angeles, California, U.S.
- Occupations: Director; producer; screenwriter; actor
- Years active: 1937–1975
- Spouse: Ellen Falck (m. 1948)
- Children: 2

William Castle (born William Schloss Jr.; April 24, 1914 – May 31, 1977) was an American filmmaker and actor. He was best known as a director of horror and thriller B-movies in the 1950s and '60s, for which he devised innovative and distinctive promotional gimmicks.

Born in New York City and orphaned at 11, Castle dropped out of high school at 15 to work in the theater. He came to the attention of Columbia Pictures for his talent for promotion and was hired. He learned the trade of filmmaking and became a director, acquiring a reputation for being able to churn out competent B-movies quickly and on budget. He eventually struck out on his own, producing and directing thrillers, which, despite their low budgets, he effectively promoted using gimmicks, a trademark for which he is best known.

The Golden Globes likened Castle to P. T. Barnum, writing that "with his flair for mad inventiveness and sheer audacity, [Castle] was definitely one of the most outlandish films promoter/producer/director of all time." His distinctive gimmicks and B-movie aesthetics influenced filmmakers like Alfred Hitchcock, John Waters, Robert Zemeckis, and Joe Dante.

== Early life ==
Castle was born in New York City, the son of Jewish parents Saidie (Snellenberg) and William Schloss. His mother died when he was nine. When his father followed a year later, he was left an orphan at the age of 11. He then lived with his older sister.

"Schloss" is German for "castle", and Castle later translated his surname into English as his professional name after people had trouble pronouncing his birth name.

== Career ==
=== Getting started ===
At 13, Castle saw the play Dracula, starring Bela Lugosi, and was entranced. He watched performance after performance, eventually managing to meet Lugosi himself. He wrote in his autobiography Step Right Up! I'm Gonna Scare the Pants off America: "I knew then what I wanted to do with my life—I wanted to scare the pants off audiences." Lugosi recommended him for the position of assistant stage manager for the road company tour of the play. The 15-year-old dropped out of high school to take the job. He spent his teenage years working on Broadway in jobs ranging from set-building to acting, which proved good training for the future filmmaker.

He obtained Orson Welles' telephone number and persuaded Welles to lease him the Stony Creek Theatre in Connecticut. (Welles was leaving to begin filming Citizen Kane.) He hired German actress Ellen Schwanneke; upon learning that, under then-current theater guild regulations, German-born actors could appear only in plays originally performed in Germany, Castle claimed he had hired her for the nonexistent play Das ist nicht für Kinder (Not for Children), then spent the following weekend writing the play and having it translated into German. When Nazi Germany sent Schwanneke an invitation to a Munich performance, Castle seized the opportunity for an outrageous publicity stunt. He released to the newspapers what he claimed was a telegram he had sent turning down the request, portraying his star as "the girl who said no to Hitler." To add to the sensationalism, he secretly vandalized the theatre and painted swastikas on the exterior. It worked—the resulting publicity ensured the play's success.

=== Columbia Pictures and other studios ===
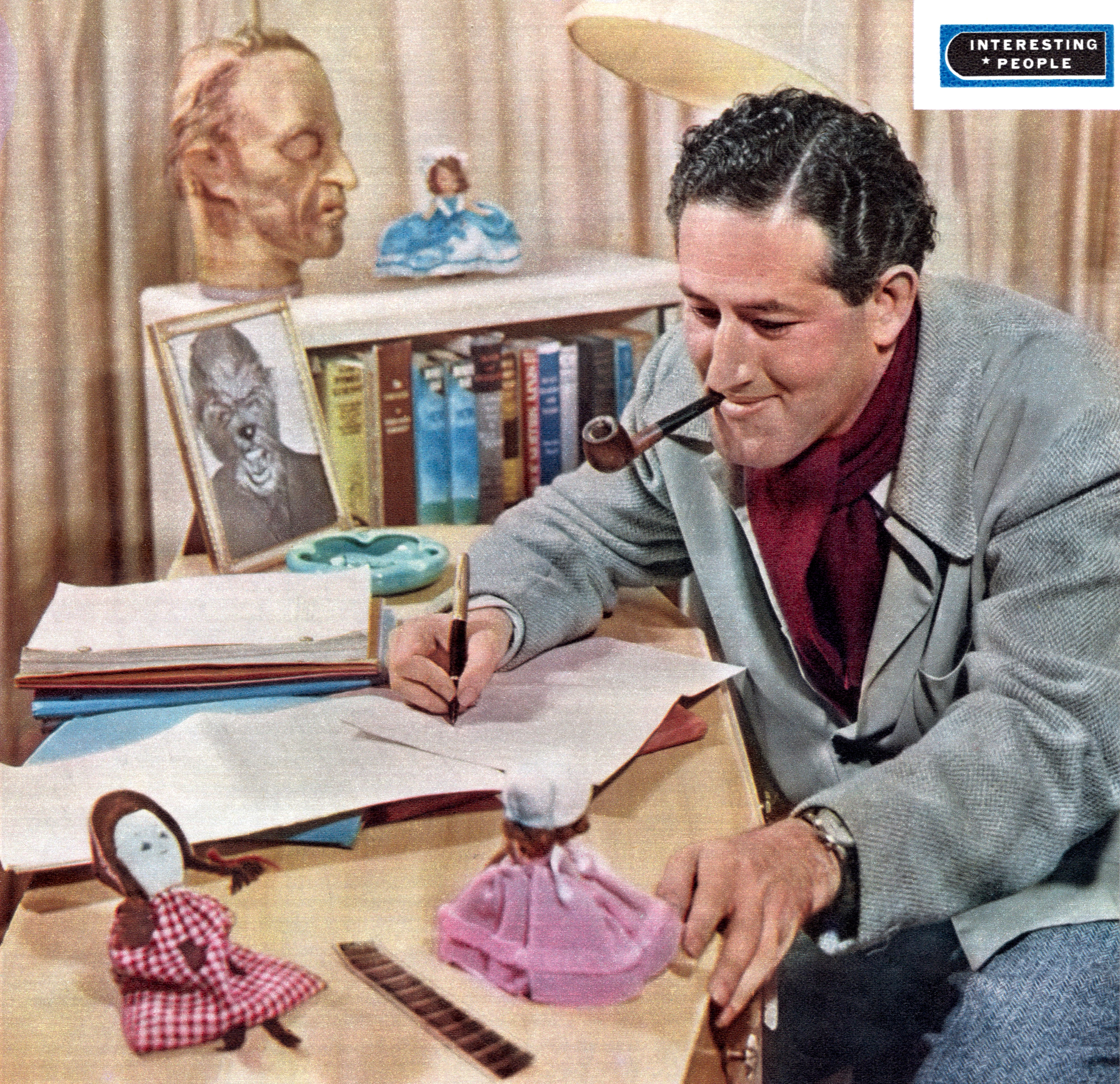
William Castle, director at Columbia Pictures (1946)

He left for Hollywood at 23 to work for Harry Cohn at Columbia Pictures. Beginning as a dialogue director for Music in My Heart (1940), he and several others, such as Fred Sears, Mel Ferrer, Henry Levin and Robert Gordon, were selected as feature film directors.

In the 2007 documentary Spine Tingler! The William Castle Story, Castle's daughter states he had a dynamic, outgoing personality that attracted others. He was one of the few people Cohn liked. He learned the film business and graduated to directing inexpensive B-movies, the first being The Chance of a Lifetime, released in 1943. He directed four movies in The Whistler series, and gained a reputation for making films quickly and under budget. He also worked as an associate producer on Orson Welles' film noir The Lady from Shanghai (1947), doing much second unit location work.

=== On his own: the gimmicks ===
Castle began making films independently. The inspiration of the 1955 French psychological thriller Les Diaboliques set the genre he would choose. He financed his first movie, Macabre (1958), by mortgaging his house. He came up with the idea to give every customer a certificate for a $1,000 life insurance policy from Lloyd's of London in case they should die of fright during the film. He stationed nurses in the lobbies with hearses parked outside the theaters. Macabre was a hit.

Other films (and gimmicks) followed:

- House on Haunted Hill (1959), filmed in "Emergo". A skeleton with red lighted eye sockets attached to wire floated over the audience in the final moments of some showings of the film to parallel the action on screen when a skeleton rises from a vat of acid and pursues the villainous wife of Vincent Price's character. Once word spread about the skeleton, kids enjoyed trying to knock it down with candy boxes, soda cups, or any other objects at hand.

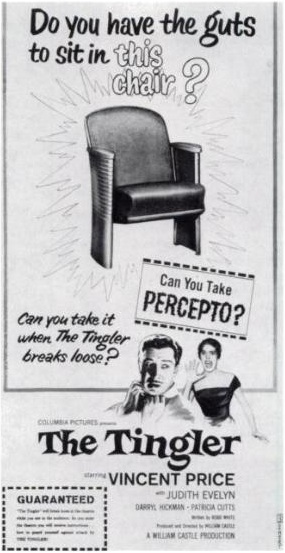
The Tingler, 1959: "Can You Take Percepto?"

- The Tingler (1959), filmed in "Percepto". The title character is a creature that attaches itself to the human spinal cord. It is activated by fright and can be destroyed only by screaming. Castle purchased military surplus airplane wing de-icers (consisting of vibrating motors) and had a crew travel from theatre to theatre, attaching them to the undersides of some of the seats. (In that era, a movie did not necessarily open on the same night nationwide.) In the finale, one of the creatures is said to have gotten loose in the movie theater itself. The buzzers were activated as the film's star, Vincent Price, warned the audience to "scream—scream for your lives!" Some sources incorrectly state the seats were wired to give electrical jolts. Filmmaker and Castle fan John Waters recounted in Spine Tingler! how, as a youngster, he searched for a seat that had been wired to enjoy the full effect.
- 13 Ghosts (1960), filmed in "Illusion-O." Each patron received a handheld ghost viewer/remover. During certain segments of the film, a person could see the ghosts by looking through the red cellophane or hide them by looking through the blue. Without the viewer, the ghosts were somewhat visible. The DVD release included red/blue glasses (not 3D glasses, as sometimes reported) to replicate the effect.
- Homicidal (1961). There was a "fright break" with a timer overlaid on the film's climax, as the heroine approaches a house harboring a sadistic killer. The audience had 45 seconds to leave and get a full refund if they were too frightened to see the remainder of the film. In an early showing, wily patrons simply sat through the movie a second time and left at the break to get their money back; to prevent this in future, Castle had different color tickets printed for each showing. About 1% of patrons still demanded refunds. John Waters described Castle's response:

"William Castle simply went nuts. He came up with "Coward's Corner," a yellow cardboard booth, manned by a bewildered theater employee in the lobby. When the Fright Break was announced, and you found that you couldn't take it anymore, you had to leave your seat and, in front of the entire audience, follow yellow footsteps up the aisle, bathed in a yellow light. Before you reached Coward's Corner, you crossed yellow lines with the stenciled message: "Cowards Keep Walking." You passed a nurse (in a yellow uniform?...I wonder), who would offer a blood-pressure test. All the while a recording was blaring, "Watch the chicken! Watch him shiver in Coward's Corner!" As the audience howled, you had to go through one final indignity – at Coward's Corner you were forced to sign a yellow card stating, 'I am a bona fide coward.' "

In a trailer for the film, Castle explained the use of the Coward's Certificate and admonished the viewer not to reveal the ending to friends "or they will kill you. If they don't, I will."

- Mr. Sardonicus (1961). The audience could vote on the villain's fate in a "punishment poll" during the climax—Castle appeared on screen to explain two options. Each member of the audience was given a card with a glow-in-the-dark thumb they could hold up or down to decide if Mr. Sardonicus should be cured or die. Supposedly no audience ever chose mercy, so the alternate ending was never screened. Though Castle claimed in his autobiography that the merciful version was shot and shown occasionally, many suspect otherwise. In the drive-in version, drivers were asked to flash their car headlights to choose.
- Zotz! (1962). Each patron was given a "magic" (gold colored, plastic, glow-in-the-dark) coin.
- 13 Frightened Girls (1963). Castle launched a publicized worldwide casting hunt for the prettiest girls from different countries (not 13 as in the title, but 15). He filmed slightly different versions, highlighting each girl for the release in her country.
- Strait-Jacket (1964). Advised by his financial backers to eliminate gimmicks, Castle hired Joan Crawford to star and sent her on a promotional tour to select theatres. At the last minute, Castle had cardboard axes printed that were handed out to patrons.
- I Saw What You Did (1965). Another Joan Crawford vehicle, this film was initially promoted using giant plastic telephones, but after a rash of prank phone calls and complaints, the Bell Telephone Company monopoly refused Castle permission to use them or mention telephones. So he turned the back rows of theatres into "Shock Sections." Seat belts were installed to keep patrons from being jolted from their chairs in fright.
- Bug (1975). Castle advertised a million-dollar life insurance policy for the film's star, "Hercules" the cockroach.

At the height of his popularity, Castle had a fan club with 250,000 members.

=== Rosemary's Baby ===
According to Spine Tingler! The William Castle Story, he mortgaged his home (again) and obtained the movie rights to the Ira Levin novel before it was published, hoping to finally direct a prestigious A-movie himself. In his autobiography, Castle claimed that he was the second director to have been approached for the film project, after Alfred Hitchcock. He made a deal with Paramount Pictures, then under Robert Evans, who insisted on hiring director Roman Polanski. Castle had to settle for producing the film. He had a cameo, playing the grey-haired man standing outside the phone booth where Rosemary, played by Mia Farrow, is attempting to get in touch with her obstetrician.

Castle was unable to build on the film's success. He suffered kidney failure soon after its release. By the time he recovered, all momentum had been lost, and he went back to making B-movies. His most significant acting role was also his last—as the director of the doomed "Waterloo" epic in The Day of the Locust in 1975.

== Personal life ==
Castle married German-born Ellen Falck in 1948. They had two children. He was a lifelong smoker, and often appeared in public and in advertisements with his trademark cigar.

=== Death ===
Castle died on May 31, 1977, in Los Angeles, California, of a heart attack. He is interred in the Forest Lawn Memorial Park Cemetery in Glendale, California.

== Legacy ==
Alfred Hitchcock decided to make Psycho after noting the financial success of 1950s B-movies by Castle and Roger Corman.

Among his admirers is filmmaker John Waters, who wrote, "William Castle was my idol. His films made me want to make films... William Castle was God." Waters portrayed Castle in the episode "Hagsploitation" in the first season of the FX television anthology series Feud (2017), depicting the notorious rivalry between Bette Davis and Joan Crawford through the production and aftermath of What Ever Happened to Baby Jane? (1962).

He is Robert Zemeckis's "favorite filmmaker." Zemeckis co-founded Dark Castle Entertainment, which was intended to remake Castle's films. They remade two of Castle's movies, House on Haunted Hill in 1999 and Thirteen Ghosts in 2001 together with his daughter Terry Ann Castle as co-producer. Dark Castle Entertainment went on to produce original material and remakes of non-Castle films.

A documentary focusing on Castle's life, Spine Tingler! The William Castle Story, directed by Jeffrey Schwarz, premiered at AFI Fest 2007 in Los Angeles on November 8, 2007. It won the Audience Award for Best Documentary.

The protagonist in the 1993 film Matinee, played by John Goodman, is based on Castle.

== Filmography ==
=== Film ===
Year	Title	Functioned as			Notes
Year	Title	Director	Writer	Producer	Notes
1939	Coney Island	Yes	No	No	Documentary short
1943	Black Marketing	Yes	No	No	Documentary short
1943	The Chance of a Lifetime	Yes	No	No	
1943	Klondike Kate	Yes	No	No	
1944	The Whistler	Yes	No	No	
1944	She's a Soldier Too	Yes	No	No	
1944	When Strangers Marry	Yes	No	No	
1944	The Mark of the Whistler	Yes	No	No	
1945	Voice of the Whistler	Yes	Yes	No	
1945	Crime Doctor's Warning	Yes	No	No	
1946	Just Before Dawn	Yes	No	No	
1946	Mysterious Intruder	Yes	No	No	
1946	The Return of Rusty	Yes	No	No	
1946	Crime Doctor's Man Hunt	Yes	No	No	
1947	The Crime Doctor's Gamble	Yes	No	No	
1947	The Lady from Shanghai	2nd unit	Uncred.	Associate	
1948	Texas, Brooklyn & Heaven	Yes	No	No	
1948	The Gentleman from Nowhere	Yes	No	No	
1949	Johnny Stool Pigeon	Yes	No	No	
1949	Undertow	Yes	No	No	
1950	It's a Small World	Yes	Yes	No	
1951	The Fat Man	Yes	No	No	
1951	Hollywood Story	Yes	No	No	
1951	Cave of Outlaws	Yes	No	No	
1953	Fort Ti	Yes	No	No	
1953	Serpent of the Nile	Yes	No	No	
1953	Conquest of Cochise	Yes	No	No	
1953	Slaves of Babylon	Yes	No	No	
1954	Masterson of Kansas	Yes	No	No	
1954	Charge of the Lancers	Yes	No	No	
1954	The Battle of Rogue River	Yes	No	No	
1954	The Iron Glove	Yes	No	No	
1954	Jesse James vs. the Daltons	Yes	No	No	
1954	Drums of Tahiti	Yes	No	No	
1954	The Saracen Blade	Yes	No	No	
1954	The Law vs. Billy the Kid	Yes	No	No	
1955	The Americano	Yes	No	No	
1955	New Orleans Uncensored	Yes	No	No	
1955	The Gun That Won the West	Yes	No	No	
1955	Duel on the Mississippi	Yes	No	No	
1956	The Houston Story	Yes	No	No	
1956	Uranium Boom	Yes	No	No	
1958	Macabre	Yes	No	Yes	
1959	House on Haunted Hill	Yes	No	Yes	
1959	The Tingler	Yes	No	Yes	
1960	13 Ghosts	Yes	No	Yes	
1961	Homicidal	Yes	No	Yes	
1961	Mr. Sardonicus	Yes	No	Yes	
1962	Zotz!	Yes	No	Yes	
1963	13 Frightened Girls	Yes	No	Yes	
1963	The Old Dark House	Yes	No	Yes	
1964	Strait-Jacket	Yes	No	Yes	
1964	The Night Walker	Yes	No	Yes	
1965	I Saw What You Did	Yes	No	Yes	
1966	Let's Kill Uncle	Yes	No	Yes	
1967	The Busy Body	Yes	No	Yes	
1967	The Spirit Is Willing	Yes	No	Yes	
1968	Project X	Yes	No	Yes	
1974	Shanks	Yes	No	Executive	
1975	Bug	No	Yes	Yes	

==== Producer only ====
Year	Title	Director
1968	Rosemary's Baby	Roman Polanski
1969	Riot	Buzz Kulik

==== Writer only ====
Year	Title	Director	Notes
1942	North to the Klondike	Erle C. Kenton	
1945	Dillinger	Max Nosseck	Uncredited

==== Acting roles ====
Year	Title	Role	Notes
1937	When Love Is Young	Reporter	Uncredited
1937	It Could Happen to You	Dignified Reporter	Uncredited
1937	The Man Who Cried Wolf	Customer at Box Office	Uncredited
1940	The Lady in Question	Angry Juror	Uncredited
	He Stayed for Breakfast	Police Officer	Uncredited
1944	When Strangers Marry	Man in Photograph	Uncredited
1950	It's a Small World	Police Officer	Uncredited
1951	Hollywood Story	Himself	Uncredited
1959	The Tingler	Himself	
1960	13 Ghosts	Himself	
1961	Homicidal	Himself	
1961	Mr. Sardonicus	Himself	
1962	Zotz!	Himself	
1966	Let's Kill Uncle	Russell Harrison	Uncredited
1967	The Spirit Is Willing	Mr. Hymer	Uncredited
1968	Rosemary's Baby	Man by Pay Phone	Uncredited
1974	Shanks	Grocer	
1975	Shampoo	Sid Roth	
1975	The Day of the Locust	Director	

=== Television ===
Year	Title	Functioned as			Notes
Year	Title	Director	Writer	Producer	Notes
1956	The Man Called X	Yes	No	No	Episode: "Assassination"
1956	Science Fiction Theatre	Yes	No	No	Episode: "Who Is This Man?"
1957	The Court of Last Resort	Yes	No	No	Episode: "The Jim Thompson Case"
1957	The Californians	Yes	No	No	2 episodes
1957–58	Men of Annapolis	Yes	Yes	Yes	Director; 11 episodes Writer; 1 episode Producer; 37 episodes
1958	Man with a Camera	Yes	No	No	Episode "Closeup on Violence"
1958	Target	Yes	No	No	2 episodes
1958	Meet McGraw	No	No	Yes	4 episodes
1963	The Plot Thickens	No	Yes	No	Unsold pilot
1972–73	Ghost Story	No	No	Yes	22 episodes

==== Acting roles ====
Year	Title	Role	Notes
1959	A Christmas Festival	The Cold Man	TV movie
1974	The Sex Symbol	Jack P. Harper	TV movie
1972–73	Ghost Story	Man Leaving Bar, J.B. Filmore	2 episodes

== Stage credits ==
Year	Title	Functioned as			Venue	Notes
Year	Title	Director	Writer	Other	Venue	Notes
1928	Dracula	No	No	Yes	Various (U.S. tour)	Assist. stage manager
1940	Not for Children	Yes	Uncred.	No	Stony Creek Theatre, Branford	
1944	Meet a Body	Yes	No	No	Forrest Theatre, New York	
1945	Star-Spangled Family	Yes	No	No	Biltmore Theatre, New York	

=== Acting roles ===
Year	Title	Role	Venue	Notes
1922	The Torch-Bearers	Teddy Spearing	48th Street Theatre, New York	
1922	The Torch-Bearers	Teddy Spearing	Vanderbilt Theatre, New York	
1931	Ebb Tide	Slim Carter	New Yorker Theatre, New York	
1931	No More Frontier	Mord Bailey	Provincetown Playhouse, New York	
1934–35	The Great Waltz	Ensemble member	Center Theatre, New York	
1935–36	Jubilee	Ensemble member	Imperial Theatre, New York	
1937–38	Hooray for What!	Ensemble member	Winter Garden Theatre, New York	
1940	Walk With Music	Stuart Hobson	Ethel Barrymore Theatre, New York	
1941	Liberty Jones	Ensemble member	Shubert Theatre, New York	

== Bibliography ==
- Castle, William, with introduction by John Waters (1976, republished 1992, republished 2010). Step Right Up! I'm Gonna Scare the Pants Off America: Memoirs of a B-Movie Mogul. New York, Putnam. ISBN 0886876575 (Pharos edition 1992). ISBN 9780578066820 (William Castle Productions 2010).
- Castle, William and Joseph, Robert, with introduction by Orson Welles (1945). Hero's Oak. New York, The Reader's Press.
- Waters, John (1983). Crackpot: The Obsessions of John Waters. New York, Macmillan Publishing Company. Chapter 2, "Whatever Happened to Showmanship?," was originally published in American Film December 1983 in a slightly different form.
- Castle, William (2011). "From the Grave: The Prayer." William Castle Productions. ISBN 0615507573.
- Documentary. Spine Tingler! The William Castle Story (2007) Director: Jeffrey Schwarz.
- Robert Bloch. Once Around the Bloch: An Unauthorised Autobiography. NY: Tor Books, 1993. Chapter 35 deals with Bloch's experiences scripting Strait-Jacket for Castle.
