= Voice of the Whistler =

1945 film by William Castle

- Theatrical release poster
- Directed by: William Castle
- Screenplay by: William Castle; Wilfred H. Petitt
- Story by: Allan Radar
- Based on: The Whistler; 1942-55 radio series by J. Donald Wilson
- Produced by: Rudolph C. Flothow
- Starring: Richard Dix; Lynn Merrick; Rhys Williams
- Narrated by: Otto Forrest
- Cinematography: George Meehan
- Edited by: Dwight Caldwell
- Music by: Mario Castelnuovo-Tedesco
- Production company: Larry Darmour Productions
- Distributed by: Columbia Pictures
- Release date: October 30, 1945 (United States)
- Running time: 60 minutes
- Country: United States
- Language: English

Voice of the Whistler is a 1945 American mystery film noir directed by William Castle and starring Richard Dix, Lynn Merrick, and Rhys Williams. It was the fourth of Columbia Pictures' eight "Whistler" films produced in the 1940s, all based on the radio drama The Whistler.

== Plot ==
A dying millionaire, trying to do good, marries his penniless young nurse so she can inherit his wealth and live in comfort. He then miraculously recovers, but the troubles for both husband and wife are just beginning.

== Cast ==
- Richard Dix as John Sinclair, alias John Carter
- Lynn Merrick as Joan Martin Sinclair
- Rhys Williams as Ernie Sparrow
- James Cardwell as Fred (Doc) Graham
- Tom Kennedy as Ferdinand / Hammerlock
