= The Power of the Whistler =

1945 film by Lew Landers

- Theatrical release poster
- Directed by: Lew Landers
- Screenplay by: Aubrey Wisberg
- Based on: The Whistler; 1942-55 radio series by J. Donald Wilson
- Produced by: Leonard S. Picker
- Starring: Richard Dix; Janis Carter
- Narrated by: Otto Forrest
- Cinematography: L. William O'Connell
- Edited by: Reg Browne
- Production company: Larry Darmour Productions
- Distributed by: Columbia Pictures
- Release date: April 19, 1945 (United States)
- Running time: 66 minutes
- Country: United States
- Language: English

The Power of the Whistler is a 1945 film noir thriller film based on the radio drama The Whistler. Directed by Lew Landers, the production features Richard Dix. It is the third of Columbia Pictures' eight "Whistler" films produced in the 1940s, seven starring Dix.

== Plot ==
Dix plays a man who after almost getting hit by a car and then hitting his head on a pole, becomes an amnesiac who learns about his name and past through the help of amateur fortune teller Jean Lang (Janis Carter).

The fortune teller sees the mysterious-looking man when she is in a restaurant with her sister and the sister's boyfriend. Without meeting him, she predicts that he will be near death in the coming day.

Charmed by his pleasant, cultured manner, she resolves to help him uncover the mystery of his life. She continues to do so, even as she encounters signs that they may find something scary.

== Cast ==
- Richard Dix as William Everest
- Janis Carter as Jean Lang
- Jeff Donnell as Frances
- Loren Tindall as Charlie Kent
- Tala Birell as Constantina Ivaneska
- John Abbott as Kaspar Andropolous

== Reception ==
Critic Leonard Maltin said of the film, "Third Whistler entry is a little padded but still genuinely eerie."
