= Dillinger (1945 film) =

1945 film by Max Nosseck

- Theatrical release poster
- Directed by: Max Nosseck
- Written by: William Castle (uncredited); Philip Yordan
- Produced by: Frank and Maurice King
- Starring: Lawrence Tierney; Edmund Lowe; Anne Jeffreys; Elisha Cook Jr. Eduardo Ciannelli
- Cinematography: Jackson Rose
- Edited by: Edward Mann
- Music by: Dimitri Tiomkin
- Production company: Monogram Pictures
- Distributed by: Monogram Pictures
- Release date: April 6, 1945
- Running time: 70 minutes
- Country: United States
- Language: English
- Budget: $150,000 or $65,000 or $193,000
- Box office: $2 million or $4 million

Dillinger is a 1945 gangster film telling the story of John Dillinger.

The film was directed by Max Nosseck. Dillinger was the first major film to star Lawrence Tierney. The B-movie was shot in black and white and features a smoke-bomb bank robbery edited into the film from the 1937 Fritz Lang film You Only Live Once. The film was released on DVD by Warner Bros. for the Film Noir Classic Collections 2 in 2005, even though the film generally is not regarded as being film noir. Some sequences were shot at Big Bear Lake, California.

== Plot summary ==
A newsreel plays, summing up the gangster life of John Dillinger in detail. At the end of the newsreel, Dillinger's father walks onto the stage and speaks to the movie audience about his son's childhood back in Indiana, which he says was ordinary and not very eventful, but concedes that his son had ambitions and wanted to go his own way. The young Dillinger left his town to find his fortune in Indianapolis, but soon ran out of money. The scene fades to a restaurant, where John is on a date and finds himself humiliated by the waiter who refuses to accept a check for the meal; John excuses himself, runs into a nearby grocery store and robs it for $7.20 in cash. He makes the clerk at the store believe he has a gun in his hand under the jacket.

John is soon arrested for this felony, and he is sentenced to prison. When incarcerated, he becomes good friends with Specs Green, his cellmate. Specs is an infamous bank robber whose gang – Marco Minnelli, Doc Madison and Kirk Otto – are also in the same prison. John is impressed by Specs and his experience and intelligence, and begins to look up to him as a father figure.

Because John has a much shorter sentence, he decides he will be the gang's outside help when he is released, intending to facilitate their escape. As soon as John is free, he holds up the box office at a movie theater. Before he does, he flirts with the female clerk, Helen Rogers, with the result that she refuses to identify him in the police line-up after the robbery. Instead she goes on a date with John.

John continues his criminal spree of robberies for money to finance the escape of Specs' gang. When he has enough, he devises a plan to smuggle a barrel of firearms to the gang at their quarry job site. The plan succeeds, they add John to their gang, then start a crime wave of robberies in the American Midwest.

Specs sends John to scout for new targets because he is the only one not recognized by the witnesses at the quarry at the time of the gang's escape. John checks out the Farmer's Trust Bank, where he poses as a potential customer to get inside the office. He reports back to the gang that the security system is too sophisticated for them to bypass.

Specs still wants to hit the bank, and getting tired of John's ego and trigger-happiness, he decides to get help from outside the gang. John suggests another way to get into the bank – with gas bombs. John convinces the rest of the gang of his way, and they successfully rob the bank. Back at the hideout, John demands the leader's usual double share of the loot. Specs, angry that John is usurping his as the gang's leader, tips off police that John will at a dentist's office at a certain time. John is captured but escapes from jail, then kills Specs and takes his place as the leader of the gang. Running low on cash, they decide to rob a mail train. In the process, gang member Kirk Otto is killed.

The gang part for a few weeks to lie low, and John and Helen go on a big shopping spree. They meet with the rest of the gang at a cabin lodge owned by Kirk's surrogate parents. They stay there for a while, but when the elderly couple calls the police, Dillinger kills them. Later, they realize that the police are closing in on them, so they plan to head to the Western States and continue robbing banks. Before heading west, Dillinger and his girlfriend hide out in Chicago for a few months. His girlfriend takes notice of "wanted" posters for Dillinger offering a $15,000 reward. Tiring of hiding in his room, Dillinger disguises himself and he and his girlfriend go out to spend an evening at the Biograph movie theater. Dillinger comments on his girlfriend's red dress. It becomes clear she has tipped off the police when they surround the theater as Dillinger watches the movie and mention that he will come out with a woman in a red dress. Exiting the theater, Dillinger sees the police coming after him. In a gunfight, he is killed in an alley, his only money is $7.20 – the same amount he took in his first robbery.

== Cast ==
- Lawrence Tierney as John Dillinger
- Edmund Lowe as Specs Green
- Anne Jeffreys as Helen Rogers
- Eduardo Cianelli as Marco Minelli
- Marc Lawrence as Doc Madison
- Elisha Cook Jr. as Kirk Otto
- Ralph Lewis as Tony
- Elsa Janssen as Mrs. Otto
- Ludwig Stössel as Mr. Otto
- Constance Worth as Blonde
- Fred Aldrich as Convict (uncredited)
- Walter Long as Mug (uncredited)

== Production ==
Philip Yordan was an emerging writer who had been collaborating with George Beck. The King Brothers had a deal with Monogram Pictures and asked Beck to write for them but could not offer Beck's regular fee so he recommended Yordan instead. Yordan wrote Dillinger, after working on three filmed scripts for the Kings. He wrote the last of these scripts, When Strangers Marry, with the help of the film's director William Castle. Castle also helped Yordan with the Dillinger script as he hoped to direct it.

Yordan recalled that Castle was of great assistance on the script, saying "I had a secretary and I dictated the whole script to her. William Castle was supposed to direct it. He was sitting with me as I dictated. Everybody thought this poor bastard was a cheap talent and I couldn't get him work. He worked, he made these little horror pictures at Columbia. But he couldn't work on the bigger pictures."

According to Hollywood Reporter, the original story for the script, John Dillinger, Killer, was written by William K. Howard and Robert Tasker. Yordan, who was officially the King Brothers' script editor, saw to it that he was frequently the only credited writer on their films.

According to Philip Yordan, all the major studios had agreed not to make movies that might glorify actual gangsters by name, but Monogram was not part of it. This is incorrect, as 20th Century Fox completed and released the film Roger Touhy, Gangster a month or so before Monogram announced the Dillinger project. The only censorship that applied was a wartime prohibition of the export and import of 'Gangster' films, particularly in England - this could negatively affect a film's profitability. Because of this the budget for the film was kept low, the cost-cutting can be seen in the extensive use of footage from other films. The prohibition on films depicting real-life criminals was not introduced by the Hays office in August 1945 to prevent a new cycle of gangster movies building on the popularity of the Touhy and Dillinger films and Crime, Inc.

The King Brothers wanted an unknown star to play the role of Dillinger because "it would be difficult for the public to accept a familiar face in the role" and placed adverts in the trade press "WANTED FOR MURDER, JAIL BREAK, ROBBERY A Tough Guy to Play JOHN DILLINGER". A month later, after visiting the Kings' office in person, and by one account, stealing a copy of the Dillinger script he found on a desk when nobody was there on his first visit, Lawrence Tierney was confirmed in the role.

== Release ==
Yordan says Louis B. Mayer asked Frank King to destroy the negative, but King refused when Mayer did not offer any compensation.

The Hays Office, Warner Bros and Paramount requested that advertising for the film in New York referencing James Cagney, Humphrey Bogart and Alan Ladd remove those actor's names. On the opening day of screening in New York, police attended screening to see if any fugitives attended, but no arrests were made.

The movie was banned in Chicago.

== Reception ==
=== Critical ===
Variety wrote, "with a no-name cast, Dlllinger is doubtful boxoffice though its obvious modest budget shouldn't be difficult to recoup on the duals... the pic smacks of the same intensity imparled to gangland pictures of the '30s, when such films seemed the boxoffice rage. But in 1945 Dillinger, as most such pix, seems passe... Dillinger at this late date was hardly worth the try."

=== Box office ===
The film was a huge box office hit, and by May 1945 had earned an estimated $1 million, making it one of the most successful films in the history of Monogram. Yordan says the film made $4 million of which he got a third.

Steve Broidy of Monogram did not start making more gangster films as a result of Dillinger but did greenlight a series of exploitation films such as Divorce, Black Market Babies and Allotment Wives. He said Dillinger was helped at the box office by a lifting of ban on gangster films in England on the day the film was released. As mentioned the success of the film let to a prohibition on films depicting real-life criminals introduced by the Hays office in August 1945

Lawrence Tierney was launched as a film star, although he was put under contract at another studio, RKO.

=== Lawsuits ===
Dillinger's sister sued Monogram for $500,000 claiming emotional distress.

=== Awards ===
Yordan was nominated for the Oscar for Writing Original Screenplay, earning Monogram Pictures its first Oscar nomination for a feature-length film release. Variety estimated that this Oscar would most likely go to Dillinger or Salty O'Rourke but the eventual winner was Marie Louise. Yordan believes the Academy, led by Walter Wanger, deliberately overlooked Dillinger in favor of "some picture made in Switzerland that nobody had ever seen".

Yordan also said that "Darryl Zanuck ran that picture again and again, and used it for the basis of many pictures at Fox. In other words, I had created a style."

The film is recognized by American Film Institute in these lists:

- 2003: AFI's 100 Years...100 Heroes & Villains:
  - John Dillinger – Nominated Villain

== See also ==
- List of American films of 1945
- List of hood films
