= The Thirteenth Hour (1947 film) =

1947 film by William Clemens

- Theatrical release poster
- Directed by: William Clemens
- Screenplay by: Edward Bock; Raymond L. Schrock
- Story by: Leslie Edgley
- Based on: The Whistler; 1942-1955 radio series by J. Donald Wilson
- Produced by: Rudolph C. Flothow
- Starring: Richard Dix; Karen Morley; John Kellogg
- Narrated by: Otto Forrest
- Cinematography: Vincent J. Farrar
- Edited by: Dwight Caldwell
- Music by: Arthur Morton
- Production company: Larry Darmour Productions
- Distributed by: Columbia Pictures
- Release date: February 6, 1947 (United States)
- Running time: 66 minutes
- Country: United States
- Language: English

The Thirteenth Hour is a 1947 American mystery film noir based on the radio drama The Whistler. Directed by William Clemens, the production features Richard Dix, Karen Morley and John Kellogg. It is the seventh of Columbia Pictures' eight "Whistler" films produced in the 1940s. This was the last of Dix's seven starring roles in the series, and one of only two that featured him in a sympathetic light. Suffering from heart disease, Dix was unable to continue his acting career and died in September 1949 at the age of 56.

== Plot ==
Trucking company owner/driver Steve Reynolds finds himself caught up in a feud with a rival firm. A masked assailant associated with the adversarial company attacks Steve and steals his truck. The thief runs down and kills a policeman and leaves other clues pointing at Reynolds as the murderer. With only a glove that has diamonds stashed inside the thumb, and the help of his love interest and her son, Reynolds evades police while working to clear himself.

== Cast ==
- Richard Dix as Steve Reynolds
- Karen Morley as Eileen Blair
- John Kellogg as Charlie Cook
- Jim Bannon as Jerry Mason
- Regis Toomey as Don Parker
- Bernadene Hayes as Mabel Sands
- Mark Dennis as Tommy Blair
