= The Mark of the Whistler =

1944 film by William Castle

- Theatrical release poster
- Directed by: William Castle
- Screenplay by: George Bricker
- Story by: Cornell Woolrich (short story "Dormant Account")
- Based on: The Whistler; 1942-55 radio series by J. Donald Wilson
- Produced by: Rudolph C. Flothow
- Starring: Richard Dix; Janis Carter
- Narrated by: Otto Forrest
- Cinematography: George Meehan
- Edited by: Reg Browne
- Music by: Mario Castelnuovo-Tedesco
- Production company: Larry Darmour Productions
- Distributed by: Columbia Pictures
- Release date: October 9, 1944 (United States)
- Running time: 60 minutes
- Country: United States
- Language: English

The Mark of the Whistler, aka The Marked Man, is a 1944 American mystery film noir based on the radio drama The Whistler. Directed by William Castle, the production features Richard Dix, Porter Hall and Janis Carter. It is the second of Columbia Pictures' eight "Whistler" films produced in the 1940s, all but the last starring Dix.

== Plot ==
A drifter claims the money in a dormant bank account. Later, he becomes the target of men who are the sons of the man's old partner, who is now in prison due to a conflict with him over the money.

== Cast ==
- Richard Dix as Lee Selfridge Nugent
- Janis Carter as Patricia Henley
- Porter Hall as Joe Sorsby
- Paul Guilfoyle as 'Limpy' Smith
- John Calvert as Eddie Donnelly
- Matt Willis as Perry Donnelly
- Bill Raisch as the truck driver, best known for playing the One Armed Man in The Fugitive. He lost an arm in World War II between the making of this film and The Fugitive.

== Reception ==
Bosley Crowther, the film critic for The New York Times, gave the film a mixed review, writing "The dodges by which a fellow successfully stakes a phony claim to a dormant account in a savings bank and swindles $29,000 lend some fair to middling interest to Columbia's latest Whistler-series film—one called The Mark of the Whistler...In this dubious demonstration, the film does present a criminal case with the patient documentation familiar in crime-and-punishment shorts. But the things that happen to this defrauder after he has got the cash are just the claptrap of cheap melodrama—and they are bluntly presented that way."
