= Macabre (1958 film) =

1958 film by William Castle

- Directed by: William Castle
- Screenplay by: Robb White
- Based on: The Marble Forest; 1951 novel by Theo Durrant (Note: "Theo Durrant" is a pseudonym for the group of twelve authors (Terry Adler, Anthony Boucher, Eunice Mays Boyd, Florence Ostern Faulkner, Allen Hymson, Cary Lucas, Dana Lyon, Lenore Glen Offord, Virginia Rath, Richard Shattuck, Darwin L. Teilhet, and William Worley) who each contributed one chapter to the novel; the pseudonym was taken from a San Francisco murderer executed in 1898.)
- Produced by: William Castle
- Starring: William Prince; Jim Backus
- Cinematography: Carl E. Guthrie
- Edited by: John F. Schreyer
- Music by: Les Baxter
- Color process: Black and white
- Production company: William Castle Productions
- Distributed by: Allied Artists
- Release date: March 1958
- Running time: 72 minutes
- Country: United States
- Language: English
- Budget: $120,000 (estimated)
- Box office: $5,000,000 (USA) (January 1970) (sub-total)

Macabre is a 1958 American horror film directed by William Castle, written by Robb White, and starring William Prince and Jim Backus. The film falls into both the horror and suspense genres. It was released in March 1958, and played in some areas on a double bill with The Black Scorpion (1957).

It involved one of Castle's first forays into using the promotional gimmicks that later made him famous. A certificate for a $1,000 life insurance policy from Lloyd's of London was given to each customer in case they should die of fright during the film.

== Plot ==
The film is set in the small town of Thornton, California. The plot consists of a frame story set in the present (c. 1958), an extended flashback to 1955, and an extended flashback set months before the present story. Below the events are given in chronological order.

Before 1955, Jode Wetherby is the wealthiest man in town. His two daughters, Alice and Nancy Wetherby, are the heiresses to his large fortune. Alice dates police chief Jim Tyloe, but fatefully marries Rodney Barrett. This starts an enmity between Tyloe and Barrett. Meanwhile Nancy, although blind, is enjoying a life consisting of casual sexual relationships, fast cars and voyages abroad.

In 1955, Alice has a difficult pregnancy. Barrett keeps her isolated at their home while he spends time with his mistress, the young widow Sylvia Stevenson. When Alice is about to give birth, her husband is out drinking with Sylvia and does not answer a phone call for help. Alice dies in childbirth, while giving birth to their daughter, Marge Barrett. Tyloe later meets with Barrett to inform him of both the birth and the death. He then beats Barrett, swearing that he will pay for Alice's death.

Months before the present, Nancy returns to town. She has a secret affair with her new chauffeur Nick and a casual fling with Tyloe, but turns down Tyloe's marriage proposal. Shortly after, Nancy learns that she is pregnant. She does not want to be a mother or a wife, and begs her brother-in-law Barrett for an abortion; he declines. Days before the present, Nancy dies in either a suicide or a botched abortion. Barrett is not available to get her proper medical treatment.

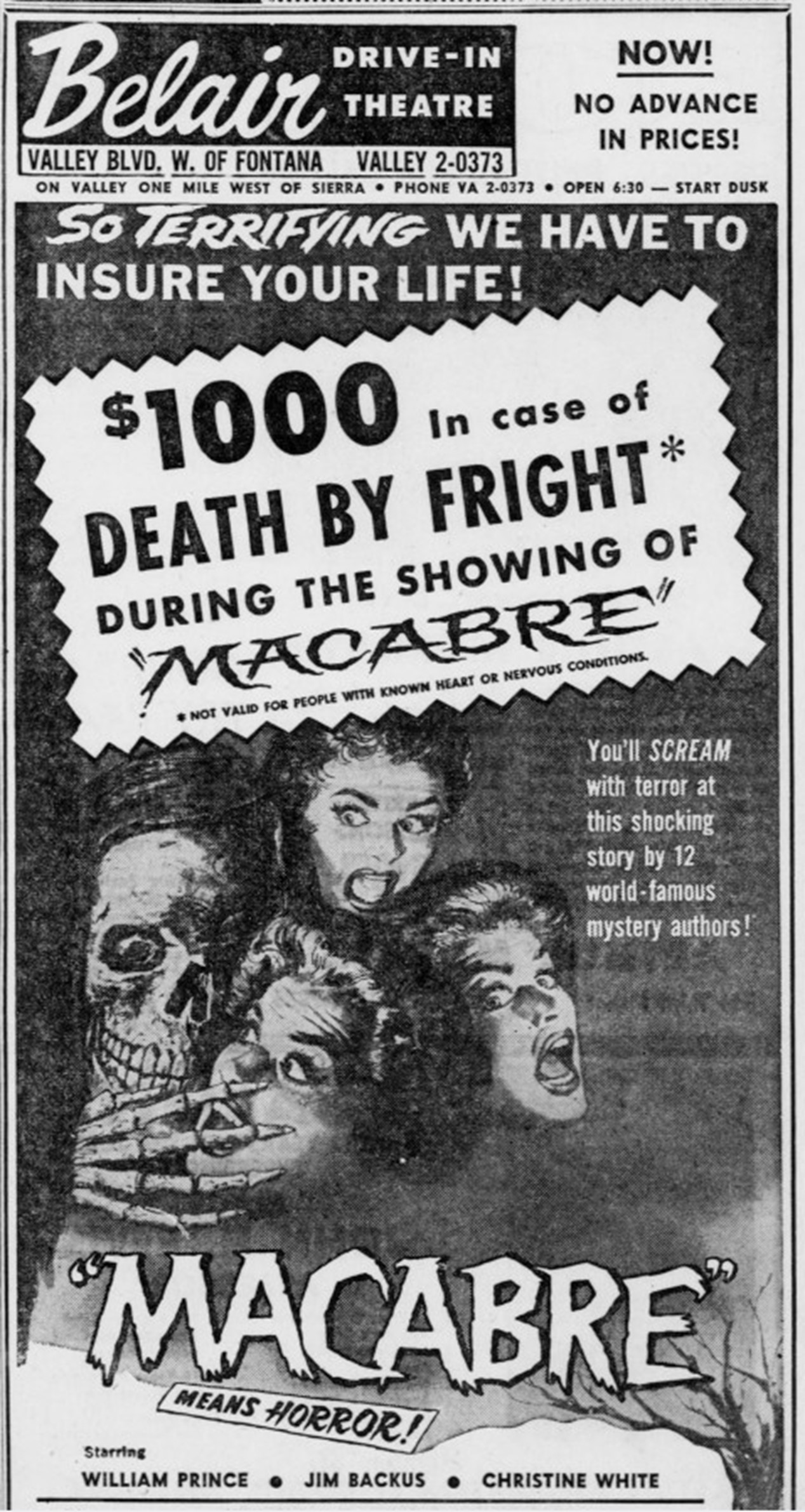
Drive-in advertisement from 1958

In the present, Barrett lives with his three-year-old daughter Marge and her nanny, Miss Kushins. The town has lost trust in him, and only a single patient is willing to consult him. Barrett's nurse assistant, Polly Baron, attempts to convince him that they should move away, but Barrett is looking forward to marrying Sylvia. At some point, Marge disappears from home, where she was last seen playing with her teddy bear. Polly receives a mysterious phone call, where the caller claims that he has kidnapped Marge and buried her alive. The caller also implies that Marge is in the company of the dead.

Barrett and Baron theorize that Marge has been buried in a used grave, and search for clues at the local graveyard. They also search the funeral parlor of Ed Quigley, where a child's coffin was recently stolen. The Wetherby family stages a midnight funeral for Nancy, during which the lost child's coffin is discovered. Within is the seemingly decayed corpse of Marge. Her grandfather Jode has a heart condition and seeing Marge like this shocks him to death.

Quigley shoots Barrett and reveals that the child "corpse" is actually a mannequin. Barrett had set up a fake kidnapping plot, and paid Quigley to help him, but Quigley had regrets. The wounded Barrett is allowed to return to his office, where he explains to Polly the details of his scheme: he was after the Wetherby inheritance for years, had allowed Alice and Nancy to die to eliminate the heiresses, and orchestrated the fake kidnapping to scare his father-in-law to death. The mysterious phone call was a prerecorded message to give him an alibi. Barrett dies before explaining where Marge is. Polly discovers the little girl sleeping safely in a secret room at the doctor's office.

== Cast ==
- William Prince as Rodney Barrett
- Jim Backus as Police Chief Jim Tyloe
- Christine White as Nancy Wetherby
- Jacqueline Scott as Polly Baron
- Susan Morrow as Sylvia Stevenson
- Jonathan Kidd as Ed Quigley
- Philip Tonge as Jode Wetherby
- Dorothy Morris as Alice Barrett
- Howard Hoffman as Hummel
- Ellen Corby as Miss Kushins
- Linda Guderman as Marge Barrett
- Robert Colbert as Nick, Nancy’s chauffeur (uncredited)

== Production ==
In July 1957, William Castle formed the production company Susina Associates with Robb White and announced their intention to make five films over the following sixteen months, the first of which would be Macabre. Castle mortgaged his Beverly Hills house to finance the film. He pitched his insurance policy gimmick to Howard Koch, and interested Koch and Aubrey Schenck enough to invest in the project as well. According to Macabre assistant director Paul Wurtzel, Koch helped Castle by letting him use Bel-Air Productions (Note: Koch's production company along with Schenck and Edwin Zabel; Wurtzel was regularly assistant director to Koch.) staff and its facilities at American National for cost plus a percentage.

Sources differ as to how much the film cost to make, putting it anywhere from $80,000 to $150,000 with $90,000 often cited. Production occurred from 29 July through 12 August 1957. Exteriors were filmed in Chino, California and interior shooting took place at Ziv Studios. (Note: Ziv had purchased American National Studios in 1955.) Castle marketed Macabre to several distributors before Allied Artists picked it up for $125,000.

== Release ==
Castle employed a method he called "barnstorming" which involved following the film to different markets and promoting it along the way. In addition to the ads touting the $1,000 insurance policy, (Note: Lloyd's stipulated its name could not be used on printed marketing materials.) methods used for Macabre included hiring fake nurses to stand by in the lobby and parking hearses outside theaters. Castle arrived at the premiere by emerging from a coffin; at a Minneapolis theater he also sealed himself in a coffin like the kidnapped child of the story. The promotions proved successful and Macabre grossed as much as $5 million. It made $1 million in its first year.

== Reception ==
Writing for Famous Monsters in 1962, Joe Dante included Macabre among his worst horror films list. Dante described the film as "admittedly offbeat but tasteless horror tale" that was "too grim for real punch."
