= When Strangers Marry =

1944 film by William Castle

- Theatrical release poster
- Directed by: William Castle
- Screenplay by: Philip Yordan; Dennis J. Cooper
- Story by: George Moskov
- Produced by: Frank King; Maurice King
- Starring: Dean Jagger; Kim Hunter; Robert Mitchum; Neil Hamilton
- Cinematography: Ira H. Morgan
- Edited by: Martin G. Cohn
- Music by: Dimitri Tiomkin
- Production company: King Brothers Productions
- Distributed by: Monogram Pictures
- Release date: August 21, 1944 (United States)
- Running time: 67 minutes
- Country: United States
- Language: English
- Budget: $75,000 or $50,000

When Strangers Marry (rerelease title Betrayed) is a 1944 American suspense film directed by William Castle and starring Dean Jagger, Kim Hunter, Robert Mitchum, and Neil Hamilton.

== Plot ==
A rich drunk man is murdered in a hotel in Philadelphia. Millie Baxter, a naïve woman, comes to New York City from her hometown in Ohio to be with her salesman husband Paul Baxter, whom she had met only months before. Before she can find him, she learns that the police think he is the murderer. She is helped by Fred Graham, a friend from Ohio. Eventually she finds Paul, but he is acting suspiciously and living under a false name.

== Cast ==
- Dean Jagger as Paul Baxter
- Kim Hunter as Millie Baxter
- Robert Mitchum as Fred Graham (billed as Bob Mitchum)
- Neil Hamilton as Det. Lt. Blake
- Lou Lubin as Jacob Houser
- Milton Kibbee as Charlie (billed as Milt Kibbee)
- Dewey Robinson as Newsstand Owner
- Claire Whitney as Wife on Train
- Edward Keane as Husband on Train
- Virginia Sale as Hotel Chambermaid
- Dick Elliott as Sam Prescott
- Lee "Lasses" White as Old Man (billed as Lee White)
- Marta Mitrovich as Baby's Mother
- Billy Nelson as Louisville Driver
- Rhonda Fleming as Girl on Train (uncredited)
- Sam McDaniel as pullman porter

== Production ==
The film was originally known as Love from a Stranger and then I Married a Stranger.

Producers Frank and Maurice King liked The Whistler, a film that director William Castle had made, and borrowed him from Columbia Pictures for $500 a week. Castle later said that the script originally offered to him was "horrible", the story of a gangster who is killed, rejected from heaven and returned to earth. Castle had previously directed Chance of a Lifetime from a script that he disliked and did not wish to repeat the experience. He advised the King brothers that they should not make the film, and they agreed. The brothers introduced Castle to writer Philip Yordan, with whom he devised a new story idea that the Kings liked. Yordan gave the story to aspiring novelist Dennis Cooper, but Yordan later rewrote Cooper's work. Cooper and Yordan were given joint screenwriting credit in the film.

With only seven days and a budget of $50,000, filming took place in June 1944. Neil Hamilton and Kim Hunter were borrowed from Selznick International. Castle persuaded the leads to rehearse without pay and on their own time.

When Strangers Marry marked Rhonda Fleming's film debut in a small role. Fleming later claimed that she had been cast when Castle saw her walking through the backlot and said "you'll do." She also said that she was not paid for her role.

Robert Mitchum's role is among his earliest, and he had previously appeared in Johnny Doesn't Live Here Anymore for the King brothers. The Kings later claimed that they had Mitchum under a multi-picture contract and tried to enforce it, but he made no further films for them.

Castle was slated to next direct Dillinger for the King brothers but instead accepted an offer to direct the Broadway play Meet a Body.

== Reception ==
=== Critical response ===
Variety's review was positive: "Only thing wrong with this film is its misleading title. Tag, When Strangers Marry, suggests another of the problem plays of newlyweds when in reality pic is a taught (sic) psychological thriller about a murderer and a manhunt full of suspense and excitement."

In a contemporary review of the film, Orson Welles wrote: "It isn't as slick as Double Indemnity or as glossy as Laura, but it's better acted and better directed ... than either." Welles would later work with Castle on The Lady from Shanghai.

James Agee later wrote: "The story has locomotor ataxia at several of its joints and the intensity of the telling slackens off toward the end; but taking it as a whole, I have seldom, for years now, seen one hour so energetically and sensibly used in a film". Agee continues: "Bits of it, indeed, gave me a heart-lifted sense of delight in real performance and perception and ambition which I have rarely known in any film context since my own mind, and that of moving-picture making, were both sufficiently young."

== Adaptation ==
The film was adapted for an episode of Lux Video Theatre as "I Married a Stranger."

== Bibliography ==
- Castle, William (1976). Step right up!: ... I'm gonna scare the pants off America. Putnam.
