= Strait-Jacket =

1964 film by William Castle

- Theatrical release poster
- Directed by: William Castle
- Written by: Robert Bloch
- Produced by: William Castle
- Starring: Joan Crawford
- Cinematography: Arthur E. Arling
- Edited by: Edwin H. Bryant
- Music by: Van Alexander
- Color process: Black and white
- Production company: William Castle Productions
- Distributed by: Columbia Pictures
- Release date: January 8, 1964
- Running time: 93 minutes
- Country: United States
- Language: English
- Box office: $2,195,000 (rentals)

Strait-Jacket is a 1964 American psychological horror film directed and produced by William Castle, written by Robert Bloch and starring Joan Crawford. Its plot follows a woman who, having murdered her husband and his lover 20 years prior, is suspected of a series of axe murders following her release from a psychiatric hospital.

Released by Columbia Pictures in January 1964, the film was the first of two written for Castle by Bloch, the second being The Night Walker (1964). It was promoted with the tagline "Keep saying to yourself - It's only a film... It's only a film... It's only a film...".

== Plot ==
Lucy Harbin catches her husband Frank and his mistress, Stella, having sexual relations, and hacks them to death with an axe in front of their young daughter Carol. Lucy is confined to an asylum. Carol is sent to live with Lucy's brother Bill and his wife, Emily, on their farm.

Twenty years later, Lucy is released by the hospital's board into the care of Bill and Emily. Carol, who works as a sculptor in the converted guest house, is anxious about the reunion. Lucy is withdrawn and fragile. Carol encourages Lucy to update her look, resulting in Lucy resembling herself from the time of the murders. Lucy begins hearing children chanting a variation of the folk rhyme about Lizzie Borden that names Lucy, Frank and Stella instead. One night, Lucy awakens and finds Frank and Stella's heads in her bed. She runs to the other family members for help, but the heads are gone when they return to her room.

Carol invites her boyfriend, Michael Fields, to meet her mother. Carol and Michael intend to become engaged but have yet to obtain the blessing of their parents. Dressed in her new clothes, Lucy aggressively flirts with Michael, who becomes uncomfortable and leaves. Lucy's psychiatrist from the asylum, Dr. Anderson, stops by the farm to check on her. Lucy is paranoid and evasive during their conversation, then storms off. Anderson tells Carol he was opposed to releasing Lucy from the asylum, and their conversation confirms she was released too soon, so he plans to take her back to the hospital. While looking for Lucy, he is lured into the windmill tower and killed with an axe by an unseen assailant. Noticing the doctor's car is still in the driveway at nightfall, Carol hides it in the barn while farmhand Leo Krause spies on her. When Carol finds Lucy, Lucy cannot remember the past few hours and fears she may have murdered Anderson.

Leo blackmails Carol to give him Anderson's car. He later finds Anderson's body in the slaughterhouse freezer and is decapitated by the killer.

Carol convinces Lucy to have dinner with Michael and his wealthy parents at their mansion, accompanied by Bill and Emily. While the rest of the party is touring the property, Michael's parents Allison and Raymond inform Lucy that they forbid Carol from marrying their son because of Lucy's asylum stay. Vowing that Allison and Raymond will be unable to prevent the marriage, Lucy leaves the mansion in a rage and runs into the fields. Bill and Michael go out to look for her.

While Allison awaits their return, Raymond is hacked to death in the bedroom closet. Investigating his absence, Allison finds his corpse and is attacked by the killer, who wears Lucy's clothes and a mask of Lucy's face. The real Lucy, returning to apologize for her outburst, subdues the killer, removing the mask to reveal Carol. Carol confesses she always hated Lucy for leaving her without parents growing up.

Sometime later, Lucy pieces together what happened: Carol, anticipating Raymond and Allison would oppose her marrying Michael, planned to murder them and frame Lucy. She sculpted severed heads of Frank and Stella and planted them in the bedroom, played the nursery rhyme on a tape recorder, cut Frank's head out of all the photos in their family album, and made over Lucy to look like she did at the time of the murders, all to make everyone suspect that Lucy was still dangerously insane. She killed Anderson to prevent him from taking Lucy away before her plan was complete. Bill and Lucy pack up the guest house as they prepare to visit Carol, who is now locked up in the same asylum Lucy was held in. Lucy is convinced that now she can finally help Carol.

== Cast ==
- Joan Crawford as Lucy Harbin
- Diane Baker as Carol Cutler
- Leif Erickson as Bill Cutler
- Howard St. John as Raymond Fields
- John Anthony Hayes as Michael Fields
- Rochelle Hudson as Emily Cutler
- George Kennedy as Leo Krause
- Edith Atwater as Mrs. Allison Fields
- Mitchell Cox as Dr. Anderson

Strait-Jacket featured the first big-screen appearance of Lee Majors in the uncredited role of Frank Harbin, Lucy Harbin's husband, seen in the opening minutes of the film. Patricia Crest, the actress who plays Stella, is also uncredited.

== Production ==
=== Development ===
After the success of What Ever Happened to Baby Jane? (1962), Joan Crawford and other older actresses, including Bette Davis and Barbara Stanwyck, appeared in many horror movies throughout the 1960s. Strait-Jacket is one of the examples of the genre sometimes referred to as psycho-biddy, hagsploitation, or Grande Dame Guignol.

=== Casting ===
Crawford replaced Joan Blondell in the role of Lucy Harbin after Blondell was injured at home prior to shooting and could not fulfill her commitment. Crawford's negotiations included script and cast approval, a $50,000 salary, and 15 percent of the profits. Anne Helm, who was originally cast in the role as Carol, was replaced by Diane Baker, reportedly at Crawford's insistence. Baker and Crawford had appeared together in the film The Best of Everything (1959). Baker said that Helm had problems with Crawford. According to Baker, speaking on the “making-of” featurette on the DVD release, Crawford had said, "it wasn't working out, her timing was off, she wasn't getting it, she wasn't seeing eye-to-eye, or she wasn't working the way Crawford wanted to work".

=== Promotion ===
During the film's original release, moviegoers were given little cardboard axes as they entered the theater. At the end of the closing credits, the Columbia logo's torch-bearing woman is shown in her traditional pose, but decapitated, with her head resting at her feet on her pedestal.

== Reception ==
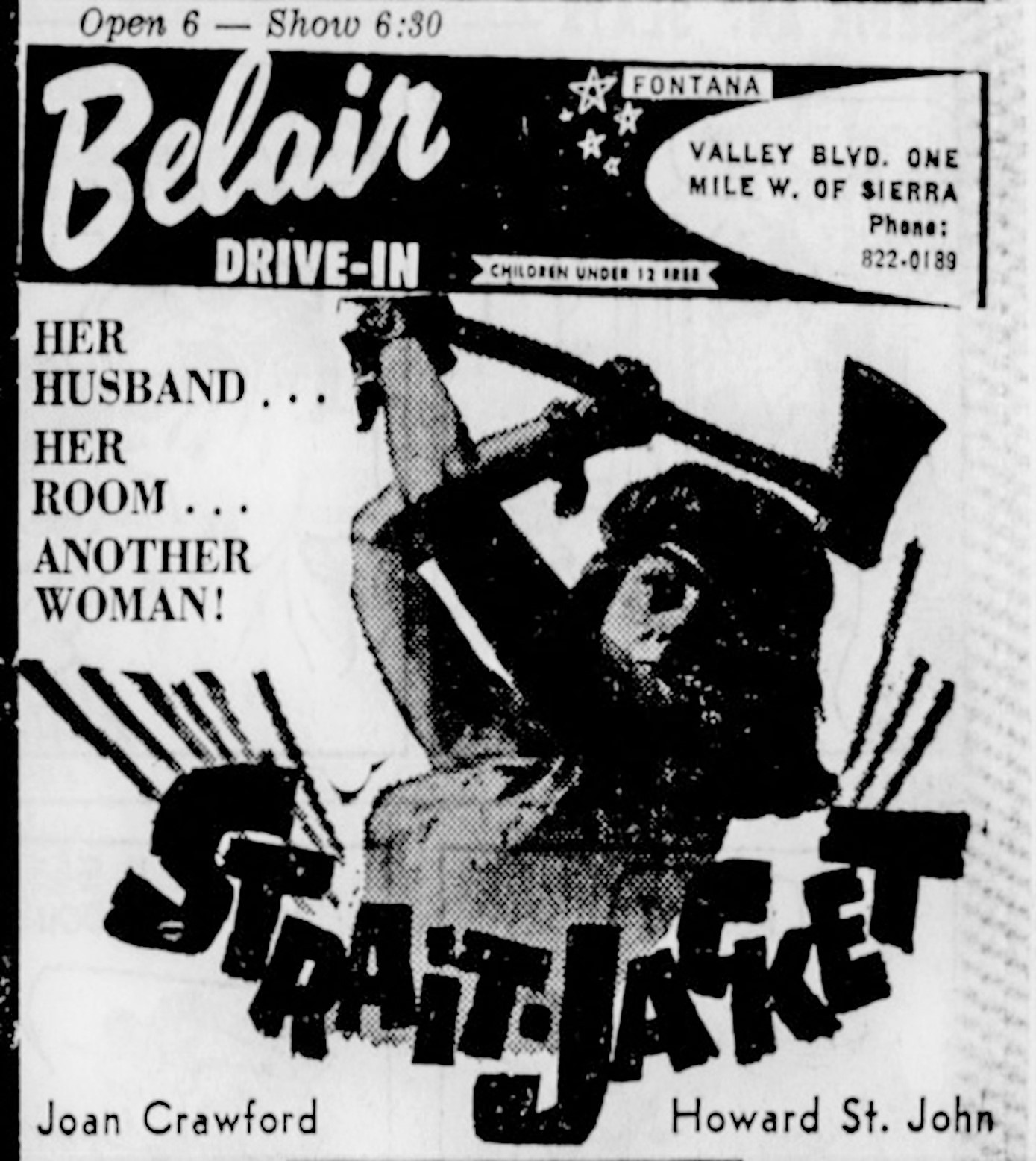
Drive-in advertisement from 1964.

The film received mixed reviews from contemporary critics, while most praised Crawford's performance; the general critical consensus being that she was better than the material. Variety noted, "Miss Crawford does well by her role, delivering an animated performance." Judith Crist commented in the New York Herald Tribune that "it's time to get Joan Crawford out of those housedress horror B movies and back into haute couture...this madness-and-murder tale...might have been a thriller, given Class A treatment." Elaine Rothschild in Films in Review wrote: "I am full of admiration for Joan Crawford, for even in drek like this she gives a performance."

Bosley Crowther, however, wrote a scathing review of both the film and Crawford's performance in The New York Times, declaring: "Joan Crawford has picked some lemons, some very sour lemons, in her day, but nigh the worst of the lot is "Strait-Jacket". He goes on to call the film a "disgusting piece of claptrap." Richard L. Coe of The Washington Post also hated the film, calling it "likely to stand as the worst picture of the year ... Apart from the absurdity of the plot and the chilling predictability of lines and situations, 'Strait-Jacket' is inexcusable for its scenes of violence."

The film has received a more positive reception from modern critics. The film is listed in Golden Raspberry Award founder John Wilson's book The Official Razzie Movie Guide as one of The 100 Most Enjoyably Bad Movies Ever Made. The film also maintains an 89% rating on review aggregation website Rotten Tomatoes, based on 9 reviews.

Assisted by Castle's promotion gimmicks, including in-person appearances by Crawford, the film was a big hit, making in 2019 adjusted grosses $60.8 million at the American box office.

== Home media ==
Strait-Jacket was released on Region 1 DVD on March 12, 2002. On February 4, 2014, it was re-released on Region 1 DVD as part of the Sony Pictures Choice Collection online program.

Shout! Factory released the film on Blu-ray on August 21, 2018. Mill Creek Entertainment also released the film along with Berserk! on a double feature Blu-ray on October 2, 2018.

== Legacy ==
An excerpt from the film is seen on TV in the 1994 John Waters film Serial Mom.

At the conclusion, the Columbia logo is seen decapitated (with her head resting at its base, near her feet) as a tongue-in-cheek ode to the film's axe murder theme.

The promotion of Strait-Jacket by the studio, the director, and Crawford are addressed in the episode "Hagsploitation" of the 2017 television miniseries Feud.

== See also ==
- List of American films of 1964
