= Richard Dix =

American actor (1893–1949)

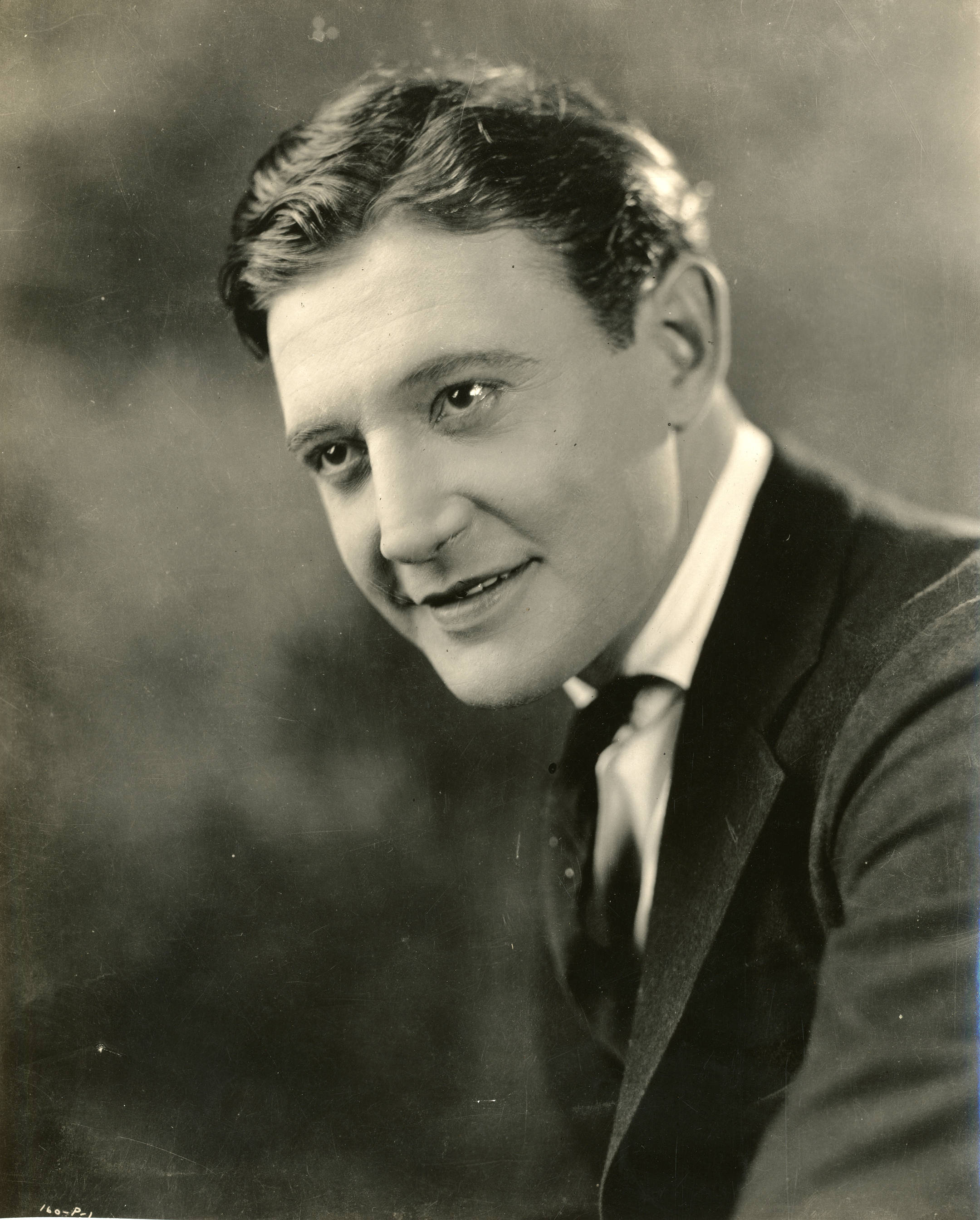
- Dix in 1923
- Born: Ernst Carlton Brimmer; July 18, 1893; Saint Paul, Minnesota, U.S.
- Died: September 20, 1949 (aged 56); Los Angeles, California, U.S.
- Resting place: Forest Lawn Memorial Park (Glendale)
- Occupation: Actor
- Years active: 1914–1947
- Spouses: Winifred Coe (m. 1931; div. 1933) Virginia Webster (m. 1934)
- Children: 4
- Awards: Hollywood Walk of Fame

Ernst Carlton Brimmer (born ; July 18, 1893 – September 20, 1949), known professionally as Richard Dix, was an American motion picture actor who achieved popularity in both silent and sound film. His standard on-screen image was that of the rugged and stalwart hero. He was nominated for the Academy Award for Best Actor for his lead role in the Best Picture-winning epic Cimarron (1931).

Dix appeared in 101 film roles, credited from his first appearance. Plagued by alcoholism, he died at 56, just two years after his film career had ended.

== Early life ==
Dix was born Ernst Carlton Brimmer on July 18, 1893, in Saint Paul, Minnesota. He received his schooling there, intending to become a surgeon to please his father. Standing 6 feet and weighing 180 pounds, Dix excelled in sports, especially football and baseball. His obvious acting talent in his school dramatic club also led him to leading roles in most of the school plays. After a year at the University of Minnesota, he took a position at a bank, and trained for the stage in the evening. His professional start was with a local stock company, and this led to similar work in New York City. He then went to Los Angeles and became leading man for the Morosco Stock Company. His success there earned him a contract with Paramount Pictures.

== Career ==
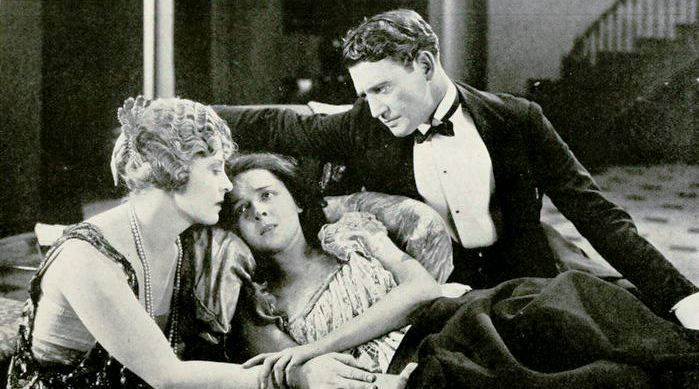
Gertrude Astor, Colleen Moore and Dix filming The Wall Flower in 1922

Upon arrival at Paramount studios Brimmer changed his name to Richard Dix. He began his Hollywood film career in dramas and romantic comedies. His first Western was in 1923, To the Last Man, his seventeenth picture, immediately followed by his best-remembered early role in Cecil B. Demille's silent version of The Ten Commandments.

Able to successfully bridge the transition from silent films to talkies and remain a leading man, he was nominated for the Academy Award for Best Actor in 1931 for his performance as Yancey Cravat in RKO's Cimarron. Based on the popular novel by Edna Ferber, it took the Best Picture award. Another memorable starring role for Dix was in a followup RKO blockbuster, the adventure The Lost Squadron.

Redskin in 1929 was Dix's last silent film

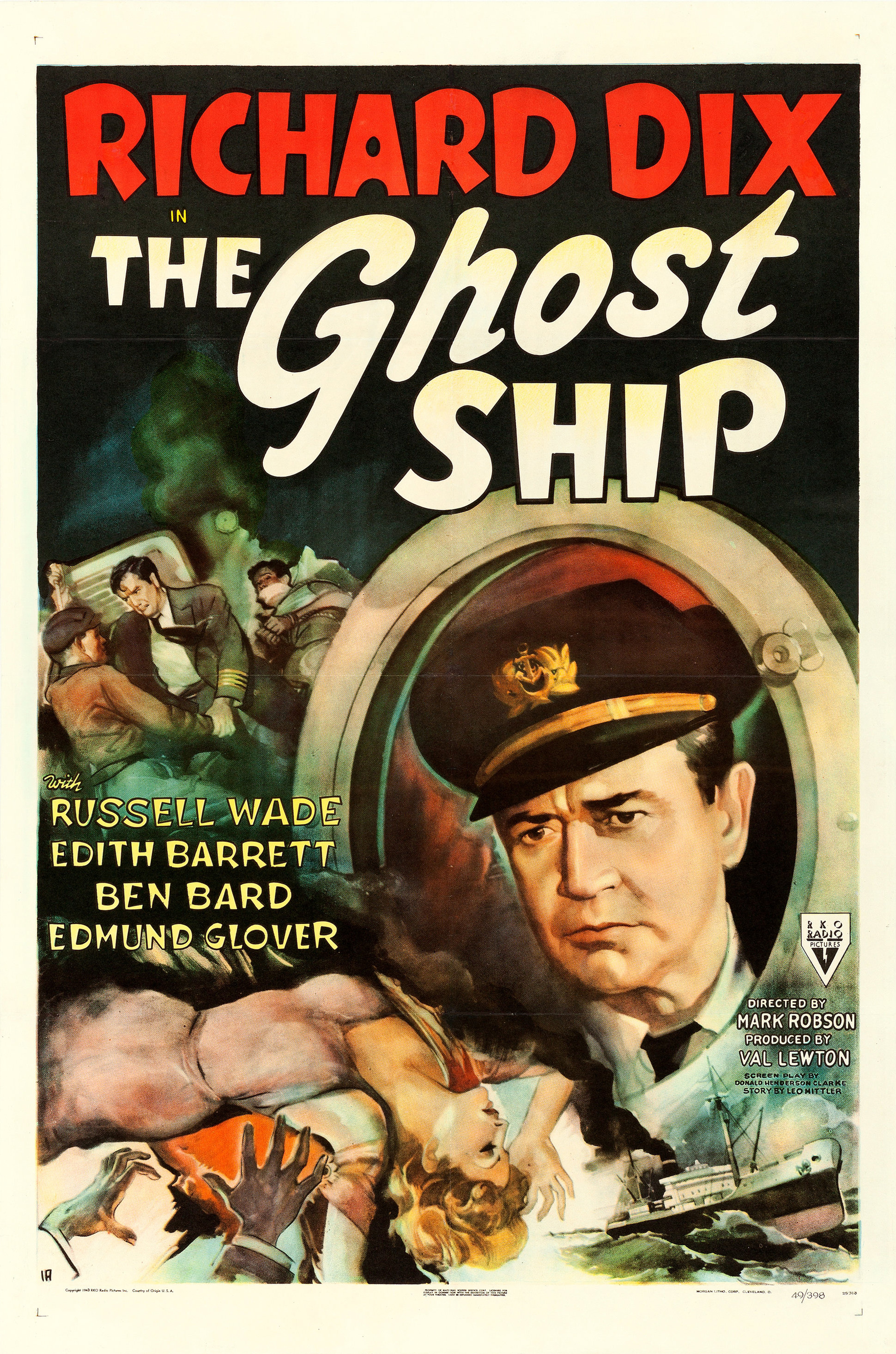
Dix was deep into B films by 1943; the budget for The Ghost Ship was a mere $150,000.

Plagued by alcoholism, Dix was unable to maintain his A-list leading man status, and spiraled into B pictures. He starred in the 1935 British futuristic film The Tunnel, as well as The Great Jasper and Blind Alibi in the late 1930s. Dix also starred as the homicidal Captain Stone in the Val Lewton production of The Ghost Ship.

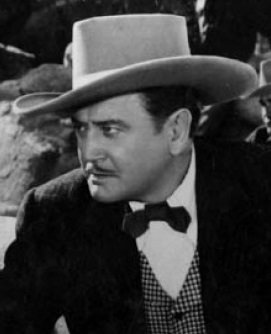
The Kansan in 1943 was another B picture, and Dix's last Western

In 1941, Dix played Wild Bill Hickok in Badlands of Dakota and portrayed Wyatt Earp the following year in Tombstone, the Town Too Tough to Die.

In 1944, he starred in The Whistler, a feature film produced by Columbia Pictures based on the popular radio program. The film adaptation was popular enough to become a series; Dix's final seven films were all films in the "Whistler" series. In these offbeat, crime-related stories, Dix did not play "The Whistler" (who was an unseen narrator who recounted strange, ironic tales as he walked by night). Instead Dix essayed a variety of characterizations, playing a completely different starring role in each film -- some sympathetic, others villainous and hard-boiled, but all of them victims of fate and circumstances conspiring against them. Dix retired from acting after the seventh of these films, The Thirteenth Hour. He suffered a heart attack in October 1948 and continued to have heart trouble until his death within the year.

== Personal life ==
Dix supported Thomas Dewey in the 1944 United States presidential election.

After years of fighting alcoholism, Dix suffered a serious heart attack at 56 on September 12, 1949 (either on a train from New York to Los Angeles or while on board a ship returning from France). He died eight days later at the Hollywood Presbyterian Hospital, and is interred in Forest Lawn Memorial Park Cemetery in Glendale, California.

== Legacy ==
Dix has a star on the Hollywood Walk of Fame in the Motion Pictures section at 1610 Vine Street. It was dedicated February 8, 1960.

== Filmography ==
=== Silent Films ===
Year	Title	Role	Notes
1917	One of Many	James Lowery	Lost film
1921	Not Guilty	Paul Ellison / Arthur Ellison	Lost film
1921	All's Fair in Love	Bobby Cameron	Lost film
1921	Dangerous Curve Ahead	Harley Jones	Lost film
1921	The Poverty of Riches	John Colby	Lost film
1922	Yellow Men and Gold	Parrish	Lost film
1922	Fools First	Tommy Frazer	Lost film
1922	The Wall Flower	Walt Breen	Lost film
1922	The Bonded Woman	Lee Marvin	A copy is held at Gosfilmofond
1922	The Sin Flood	Bill Bear	Lost film
1922	The Glorious Fool	Billy Grant	Lost film
1923	The Christian	John Storm	A copy is held at the George Eastman House
1923	Quicksands	Lieutenant Bill	Lost film
1923	Souls for Sale	Frank Claymore	
1923	The Woman with Four Faces	Richard Templar	Lost film
1923	Racing Hearts	Robby Smith	Lost film
1923	To the Last Man	Jean Isbel	A copy is held at Gosfilmofond
1923	The Ten Commandments	John McTavish	Copies are held at George Eastman and the Library of Congress
1923	The Call of the Canyon	Glenn Kilbourne	Copies are held at Gosfilmofond and the Library of Congress
1924	The Stranger	Larry Darrant	Lost film
1924	Icebound	Ben Jordan	Lost film
1924	Unguarded Women	Douglas Albright	Lost film
1924	Sinners In Heaven	Alan Croft	Lost film
1924	Manhattan	Peter Minuit	
1925	Too Many Kisses	Richard Gaylord Jr	A copy is held at the Library of Congress
1925	A Man Must Live	Geoffrey Farnell	Lost film
1925	The Shock Punch	Randall Lee Savage	A copy is held at the Library of Congress
1925	Men and Women	Will Prescott	Lost film
1925	The Lucky Devil	Randy Farnum	A copy is held at the Library of Congress
1925	The Vanishing American	Nophaie	A copy is held at the Library of Congress
1925	Womanhandled	Bill Dana	A copy is held at the Library of Congress
1926	Let's Get Married	Billy Dexter	A copy is held at the Library of Congress
1926	Fascinating Youth	Himself (cameo)	Lost film
1926	Say It Again	Bob Howard	Lost film
1926	The Quarterback	Jack Stone	A copy is held at the Library of Congress
1927	Paradise for Two	Steve Porter	Lost film
1927	Knockout Reilly	Dundee "Knockout" Reilly	Lost film
1927	Man Power	Tom Roberts	Lost film
1927	Shanghai Bound	Jim Bucklin	Lost film
1927	The Gay Defender	Joaquin Murrieta	Lost film
1928	Sporting Goods	Richard Shelby	Lost film
1928	Easy Come, Easy Go	Robert Parker	Lost film
1928	Warming Up	Bert Tulliver	Lost film filmed in silent and Movietone sound version with music and sound effects only
1928	Moran of the Marines	Michael Moran	Lost film
1929	Redskin	Wingfoot	A copy is held at the Library of Congress; partly filmed in Technicolor

=== Sound films ===
Year	Title	Role	Notes
1929	Nothing But the Truth	Robert Bennett	
1929	The Wheel of Life	Captain Leslie Yeullet	
1929	The Love Doctor	Dr. Gerald Summer	
1929	Seven Keys to Baldpate	William Halliwell Magee	
1930	Lovin' the Ladies	Peter Darby	
1930	Shooting Straight	Larry Sheldon	
1931	Cimarron	Yancey Cravat	Nominated—Academy Award for Best Actor
1931	Young Donovan's Kid	Jim Donovan	Lost film
1931	The Public Defender	Pike Winslow	
1931	Secret Service	Captain Lewis Dumont	
1932	The Lost Squadron	Capt. "Gibby" Gibson	
1932	Roar of the Dragon	Captain Chauncey Carson	
1932	Hell's Highway	Frank 'Duke' Ellis	
1932	The Conquerors	Roger Standish / Roger Standish Lennox	
1933	The Great Jasper	Jasper Horn	
1933	No Marriage Ties	Bruce Foster	
1933	Ace of Aces	2nd Lt. Rex "Rocky" Thorne	
1933	Day of Reckoning	John Day	
1934	Stingaree	Stingaree	
1934	His Greatest Gamble	Phillip Eden	
1934	West of the Pecos	Pecos Smith	Lost film
1935	The Arizonian	Clay Tallant	
1935	The Tunnel	Richard 'Mack" McAllan	
1936	Yellow Dust	Bob Culpepper	
1936	Special Investigator	William "Bill" Fenwick	
1936	Devil's Squadron	Paul Redmond	
1937	The Devil's Playground	Jack Dorgan	
1937	The Devil is Driving	Paul Driscoll	
1937	It Happened in Hollywood	Tim Bart	
1938	Blind Alibi	Paul Dover	
1938	Sky Giant	Capt. W.R. "Stag" Cahill	
1939	Twelve Crowded Hours	Nick Green	
1939	Man of Conquest	Sam Houston	
1939	Here I Am a Stranger	Duke Allen	
1939	Reno	William Shayne aka Bill Shear	
1940	The Marines Fly High	Lt. Danny Darrick	
1940	Men Against the Sky	Phil Mercedes	
1940	Cherokee Strip	Marshal Dave Lovell	
1941	The Round Up	Steve Payson	
1941	Badlands of Dakota	Wild Bill Hickok	
1942	Tombstone, the Town Too Tough to Die	Wyatt Earp	
1942	Eyes of the Underworld	Police Chief Richard Bryan	
1942	American Empire	Dan Taylor	
1943	Buckskin Frontier	Stephen Bent	
1943	The Kansan	John Bonniwell	
1943	Top Man	Tom Warren	
1943	The Ghost Ship	Captain Will Stone	
1944	The Whistler	Earl C. Conrad	
1944	The Mark of the Whistler	Lee Selfridge Nugent	
1945	The Power of the Whistler	William Everest	
1945	Voice of the Whistler	John Sinclair (John Carter)	
1946	Mysterious Intruder	Don Gale	
1946	The Secret of the Whistler	Ralph Harrison	
1947	The Thirteenth Hour	Steve Reynolds	
