= Lenore Glen Offord =

American writer and critic (1905–1991)

Lenore Glen Offord (October 24, 1905 – April 24, 1991) was an American writer and reviewer of detective fiction.

Offord was born in Spokane, Washington and attended Mills College in Oakland, California. She graduated in 1925 with a degree in English. She attended the University of California at Berkeley the following year.

Offord authored twelve books, eight of which are mysteries set in the San Francisco area.

Offord was the San Francisco Chronicle's mystery critic for more than thirty years, initially taking over Anthony Boucher's column during World War II. She received the Edgar Award for Outstanding Criticism in 1952.

A long-time devotée of the Sherlock Holmes stories, Offord was the first female member of the Baker Street Irregulars in 1958.

== Personal life ==
Lenore Glen married Harold R. Offord in 1929. They had one daughter.

== Select bibliography ==
- Murder on Russian Hill, also known as Murder Before Breakfast (1938)
- Cloth of Silver (1939)
- The 9 Dark Hours (1941)
- Clues to Burn (1942)
- Skeleton Key (1943)
- The Glass Mask (1944)
- My True Love Lies, also known as And Turned to Clay (1947)
- Smiling Tiger (1949)
- The Marble Forest, also known as The Big Fear (1951) (co-author)
- Enchanted August (1956)
- The Girl in the Belfry (1957) (with Joseph Henry Jackson)
- Walking Shadow (1959)

== Sources ==
"Mike Grost on Lenore Glen Offord," http://gadetection.pbworks.com/w/page/7931275/Offord%2C%20Lenore%20Glen
