= J. Donald Wilson =

American radio & film writer and producer (1904–1984)

- Born: John Donald Wilson; June 5, 1904; Kansas City, Missouri, U.S.
- Died: January 26, 1984 (aged 79); Van Nuys, California, U.S.
- Occupations: Radio writer; film writer; producer; voice actor
- Spouse(s): Loraine Wilson (1948; divorced) Christine McIntyre (m. 1953)
- Writing career
- Years active: 1936–1960

John Donald Wilson (June 5, 1904 – January 26, 1984) was a radio and film writer, producer, and voice actor, born in Kansas City, Missouri.

He created the title character in the radio series The Whistler, a show that he wrote. His other radio writing, producing, and directing work included The New Adventures of Nero Wolfe, The Adventures of Bill Lance, and Dark Venture.

He did voice work in radio in the 1930s. He voiced Mickey Mouse in select 1938 broadcasts of The Mickey Mouse Theater of the Air as well as other characters in Disney productions such as The Reluctant Dragon. He was the announcer on Strange As It Seems and Charlie Chan. After more than a decade of acting on radio, he became production head of ABC and later was promoted to vice president.

In 1952, Wilson produced Mystery Theater, a Friday night television program in Los Angeles. In the era of live TV, when holding TV programs to their intended durations was a problem, Wilson was noted for keeping Mystery Theater on time by using techniques that he had practiced with radio programs. Reading scripts aloud ahead of time and marking where optional cuts could be made provided the ability to adapt if a program began to run long.

He was known for his work on films such as The Whistler and Key Witness.

He inverted his first and middle names so as not to be confused with Don Wilson, the announcer on The Jack Benny Program. In 1938, it was announced that he had adopted the name Norman Wilson, but at some point he went back to J. Donald Wilson.

He was married to Loraine Wilson, who sued him for divorce in 1948 over numerous affairs, including one with his secretary Tania Karl. Wilson was later married to Christine McIntyre. He reportedly suffered a nervous breakdown in 1946, but was soon back at work. He died in 1984.

== Filmography ==
Year	Title	Role	Notes
1936	To Spring	Head Elf	Voice, uncredited
1939	Society Dog Show	Judge	Voice, uncredited
1941	The Reluctant Dragon	Mayor, Knight	Voice, uncredited
1942	Bambi	Chipmunk #2	Voice, uncredited
