= Tribulations of a Chinaman in China =

1879 novel by Jules Verne

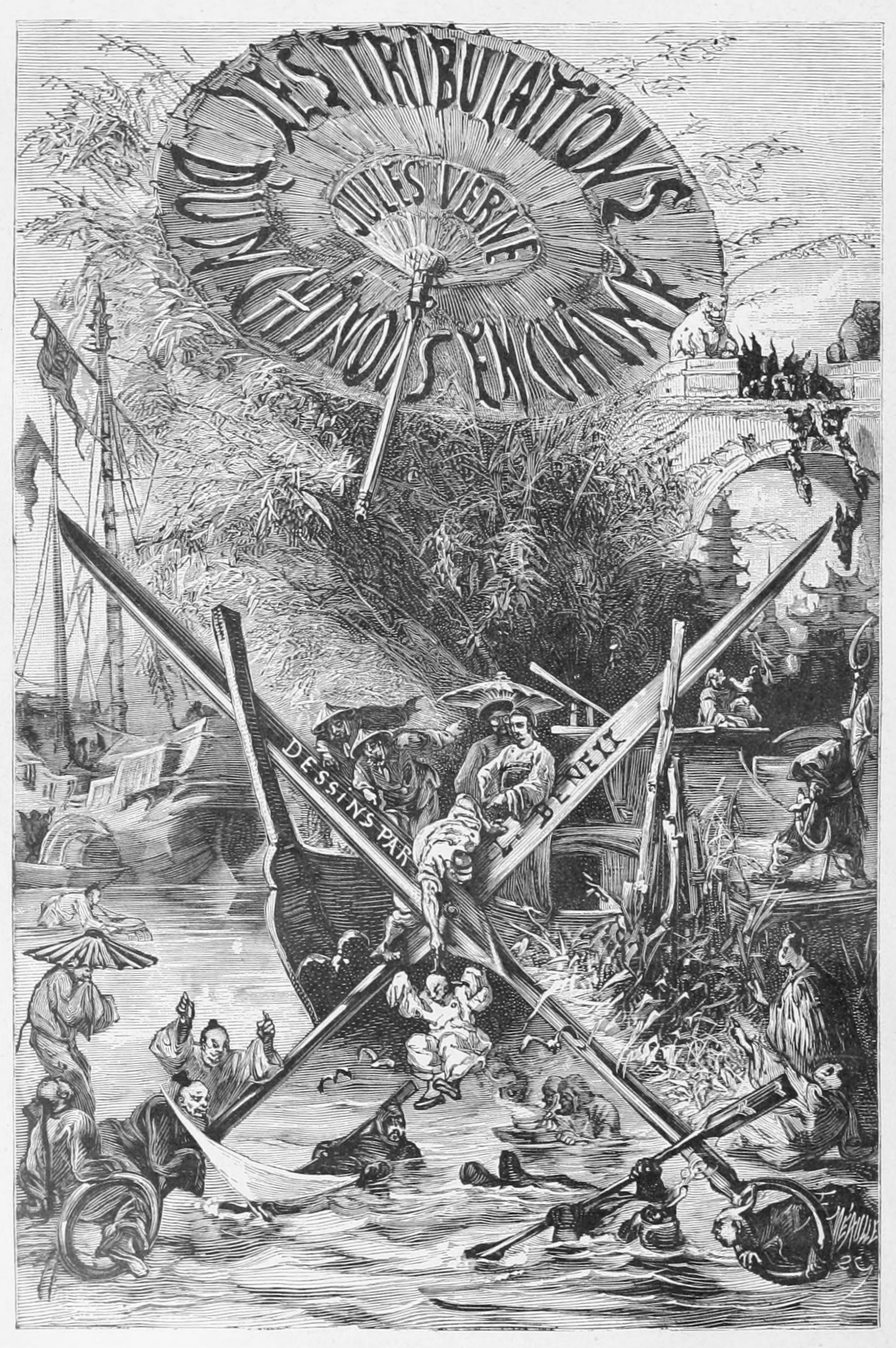
- Title page of the French original edition
- Author: Jules Verne
- Original title: Les Tribulations d'un Chinois en Chine
- Illustrator: Léon Benett
- Language: French
- Series: The Extraordinary Voyages #19
- Genre: Adventure novel
- Publisher: Pierre-Jules Hetzel
- Publication date: 1879
- Publication place: France
- English publication date: 1879
- Media type: Print (Hardback)
- Preceded by: The Begum's Fortune
- Followed by: The Steam House

Tribulations of a Chinaman in China (French: Les Tribulations d'un Chinois en Chine) is an adventure novel by Jules Verne, first published in 1879. The story is about a rich Chinese man, Kin-Fo, who is bored with life, and after some business misfortune decides to die.

== Plot summary ==
Kin-Fo is an extremely wealthy man from Shanghai who certainly does not lack material possessions. However, he is terribly bored and when news reaches him about his major investment abroad, a bank in the United States, going bankrupt, Kin-Fo decides to die. He signs up for a $200,000 life insurance covering all kinds of accidents, death in war, and even suicide; the philosopher Wang (Kin-Fo's old mentor) and Kin-Fo's fiancée are to be the beneficiaries. He rejects seppuku and hanging as means of dying, and is about to take opium laced with poison when he decides that he does not want to die without having ever felt a thrill in his life. Kin-Fo hires Wang (actually a former warrior of the Taiping Rebellion) to murder him before the life insurance expires.

After a while news reaches Kin-Fo that the American bank he had invested in was not bankrupt, but instead had pulled off a stock market trick and is now wealthier than ever. However, Wang has already disappeared. Together with two bodyguards assigned by the insurance company, and his loyal but lazy and incompetent servant Soun, Kin-Fo travels around the country in an effort to run away from Wang and the humiliation from the affair.

One day he receives a message from Wang, stating that he cannot stand the pain of having to kill one of his friends, and instead decided to take his own life while giving the task of killing Kin-Fo to a bandit he once knew. Kin-Fo, Soun and the two bodyguards now try to get to the bandit, planning to offer money in return for his life. The ship they travel with is hijacked, and they are forced to use their life vests with built-in sails to return to land.

After being kidnapped by the bandit they were looking for, they are blindfolded and returned to Kin-Fo's home, where his old friends (including Wang, who turns out to have staged the entire situation to teach him a lesson about how valuable life is) are waiting for him. He marries his young, beautiful fiancée after all and they live happily ever after.

== Style ==
The book is a traditional adventure, similar in style to Around the World in Eighty Days, one of the author's better-known books. However, it does contain more humour as well as criticism of topics such as the British opium trade in China.

== Translations ==
An English translation was serialized in The Leisure Hour in 1880.

Grace Virginia Lord, known by her pen name Virginia Champlin, was an American translator active in the late 19th century. She was born in 1834 and died in 1885. Champlin is best known for her English translations of Jules Verne's works, including The Tribulations of a Chinaman in China (1879)

== Film versions ==
A 1965 film starring Jean-Paul Belmondo, Up to His Ears, was loosely based on this novel.

A 1987 film, The Tribulations of a Chinese Gentleman, was directed by Wu Yigong, starring Chen Peisi, Rosalind Chao and Rolf Hoppe.

=== Films with similar plots ===
- Flirting with Fate (1916)
- The Man in Search of His Murderer (1931)
- Let George Do It (1938)
- Love, Honor, and Oh Baby! (1940)
- The Whistler (1944)
- You Only Live Once (1952)
- Five Days (1954)
- Comme un cheveu sur la soupe (1957)
- The Odd Job (1978)
- Tulips (1981)
- I Hired a Contract Killer (1990)
- Bulworth (1998)
- Shut Up and Shoot Me (2005)
