= 1st Golden Rooster Awards =

Award ceremony for films of 1981

The 1st Golden Rooster Awards honored the best in mainland Chinese film of 1981. The ceremony was held in Hangzhou, Zhejiang Province, May 22, 1981.

== Winners and Nominees ==
Best Film	Best Director
Legend of Tianyun Mountain; Evening Rain; The Court	Xie Jin－Legend of Tianyun Mountain; Wu Yonggang/Wu Yigong－Evening Rain; Xie Tieli－The Stars are Bright Tonight
Best Actor	Best Actress
N/A; Li Zhiyu－Evening Rain	Zhang Yu－Romance on Lushan Mountain/Evening Rain; Wang Fuli－Legend of Tianyun Mountain; Tian Hua－The Court
Best Supporting Actor/Actress	Best Writing
Shi Ling/Ouyang Ruqiu/Mao Weihui/Lin Bin/Zhong Xinghuo/Lu Qing－Evening Rain	Ye Nan－Evening Rain; Lu Yanzhou－Legend of Tianyun Mountain
Best Chinese Opera Film	Best Documentary
空缺	刘少奇同志永垂不朽; 网上群星; 喜浪藻; 黄山观奇; 跨征途
Best Animation	Best Popular Science Film
Three Monks	生命与蛋白质——人工合成胰岛素; 试管苗; 蓝色的血液
Best Cinematography	Best Art Direction
Legend of Tianyun Mountain－Xu Qi	Legend of Tianyun Mountain－Ding Chen/Chen Shaomian
Best Music	Best Sound Recording
Evening Rain－Gao Tian; Romance on Lushan Mountain－Lu Qiming	N/A
Best Editing	Best Stunt
N/A; Legend of Tianyun Mountain－Zhou Dingwen	N/A; White Snake－Jiang Yisu/Tong Lei/Dai Shengchao/Qin Xiaocheng/Pu Weizhong
Best Costume	Best Make Up
N/A	N/A
Best Property	
N/A	

== Special Award ==
- Special Jury Award
  - Film: Miao Miao
  - Voice Actor: Xiang Junshu
