= Sanmao =

Sanmao may refer to:

- Sanmao (town) (三茅镇), town in Yangzhong City, Jiangsu, PR China

Written as Chinese: 三毛; lit. 'thirty cents or three hair':

- Sanmao (comics), a young comic book character created by Zhang Leping
- Sanmao (author), penname of Chen Ping, Taiwanese author
- Sanmao (actor), the pinyinized nickname of Hong Kong martial arts actor Sammo Hung
- Wanderings of Sanmao, a 2006 cartoon series based on the comic character
