= The Man in Search of His Murderer =

1931 film

- German: Der Mann, der seinen Mörder sucht
- Directed by: Robert Siodmak
- Written by: Ernst Neubach (play); Ludwig Hirschfeld; Curt Siodmak; Billy Wilder
- Produced by: Erich Pommer
- Starring: Heinz Rühmann; Lien Deyers; Hans Leibelt
- Cinematography: Otto Baecker; Konstantin Irmen-Tschet
- Edited by: Viktor Gertler
- Music by: Friedrich Hollaender; Franz Waxman
- Production company: UFA
- Distributed by: UFA
- Release date: 5 February 1931
- Running time: 97 minutes
- Country: Germany
- Language: German

The Man in Search of His Murderer (German: Der Mann, der seinen Mörder sucht) is a 1931 German comedy film directed by Robert Siodmak and starring Heinz Rühmann, Lien Deyers and Hans Leibelt. The film is partially lost; of the original 9 acts, only five (50 minutes) remain. It was one of the early leading roles for upcoming German star Heinz Rühmann. Co-writer Billy Wilder was at the beginning of his long career. It was shot at the Babelsberg Studios in Berlin and premiered at the city's Gloria-Palast. The film's sets were designed by the art director Robert Herlth and Walter Röhrig. It was remade in 1952 as You Only Live Once.

== Cast ==
- Heinz Rühmann as Hans Herfort
- Lien Deyers as Kitty
- Raimund Janitschek as Otto Kuttlapp
- Hans Leibelt as Adamowski
- Hermann Speelmans as Jim
- Friedrich Hollaender as Chairman of 'Weisse Weste'
- Gerhard Bienert as Policeman
- Eugen Boral as Member of 'Weisse Weste'
- Otti Dietze as Innkeeper
- Victor Palfi as Hans' Friend
- Greta Keller as Singer
- Franz Fiedler
- Eberhard Mack
- Erik Schuetz
- Roland Varno
- Wolfgang von Waltershausen
- Hermann Blaß
- Fritz Odemar

== See also ==
- Tribulations of a Chinaman in China (novel by Jules Verne, 1879)
- Flirting with Fate (1916)
- The Whistler (1944)
- You Only Live Once (1952)
- Five Days (1954)
- Up to His Ears (1965)
- Tulips (1981)
- I Hired a Contract Killer (1990)
- Bulworth (1998)
- Shut Up and Shoot Me (2005)

== Bibliography ==
- Hardt, Ursula (1996). From Caligari to California: Erich Pommer's Life in the International Film Wars. Berghahn Books. ISBN 978-1-57181-930-7.
- Kreimeier, Klaus (1999). The Ufa Story: A History of Germany's Greatest Film Company, 1918–1945. University of California Press. ISBN 978-0-520-22069-0.
