= Shut Up and Shoot Me =

Shut Up and Shoot Me (Czech: Sklapni a zastřel mě) is a 2005 Czech black comedy film. It was written and directed by Steen Agro and stars Karel Roden, Andy Nyman, and Anna Geislerová.

== See also ==
- Tribulations of a Chinaman in China (novel by Jules Verne, 1879)
- Flirting with Fate (1916)
- The Man in Search of His Murderer (1931)
- The Whistler (1944)
- Five Days (1954)
- Up to His Ears (1965)
- Tulips (1981)
- I Hired a Contract Killer (1990)
- Bulworth (1998)
