= Ai Mingzhi =

Chinese author and screenwriter

- Born: February 1925 Shanghai, Republic of China
- Died: June 29, 2017 (aged 92) Shanghai, People's Republic of China
- Spouse: Zhou Yinjun (周荫君)

Chinese name
- Chinese: 艾明之
Transcriptions
Standard Mandarin
- Hanyu Pinyin: Ài Míngzhī
- Wade–Giles: Ai^{4} Ming^{2}-chih^{1}

birth name
- Traditional Chinese: 黃志堃
- Simplified Chinese: 黄志堃
Transcriptions
Standard Mandarin
- Hanyu Pinyin: Huáng Zhìkūn

Huang Zhikun (February 1925 – 29 June 2017), better known by his pen name Ai Mingzhi, was a Chinese author and screenwriter who wrote many screenplays beginning in the 1950s. During the Cultural Revolution (1966–1976) he suffered persecution with all of his works banned, but he returned to writing in 1978.

== Works translated into English ==
- Seeds of Flame (火种), partially translated into English by Sidney Shapiro and Ho Yu-chih, was serialized in the April 1964 & May 1964 issues of Chinese Literature.

== Filmography ==
Year	English title	Original title	Director(s)	Notes
1954	A Great Beginning	伟大的起点	Zhang Ke	
1957	A Nurse's Diary	护士日记	Tao Jin	based on his novel Up and Down (浮沉)
1957	Happiness	幸福	Tian Ran, Fu Chaowu	
1958	Spring Hastens the Blossoms Blooming	春催桃李	Lin Yang	co-wrote with Ru Zhijuan
1958	Giant Wave	巨浪	Liu Qiong, Qiang Ming	
1959	Huangpu River Story	黄浦江的故事	Huang Zuolin	co-wrote with Chen Xihe
1959	An Evergreen Tree	常青树	Zhao Dan	
1960	Truly Great People of This Generation	风流人物数今朝	Zhao Ming, Jiang Junchao, Yu Zhongying	co-wrote with Fei Liwen
1964	Love on Green Mountain	青山恋	Zhao Dan, Xu Tao, Qian Qianli	
1982	Little Goldfish	小金鱼	Zhang Junxiang, Li Xiepu, Wang Ji	based on his novella The Unsinkable Lake (不沉的湖)
1983	Bright Moon on the Sea	海上升明月	Liu Qiong, Sha Jie, Deng Yimin	
1987	The Tribulations of a Chinese Gentleman	少爷的磨难	Wu Yigong	co-wrote with Si Minsan and Hans Borgelt based on Tribulations of a Chinaman in China
1991	The Quest for a Dream	千里寻梦	Yang Yanjin	co-wrote with Xu Yinhua
