= Si A Piao =

Si A Piao is a comic by Chinese Indonesian cartoonist Goei Kwat Siong. Written for children, it lacked dialog and relied on other aspects of storytelling as a way of catering to its audience. It was published in the section for young readers in Star Weekly. Agus Dernawan T. of The Jakarta Post described the main character, who, according to him, "Many suggested" was a mixture of Henry and Sanmao, as "a kind and helpful boy who loved to read" adding that he is "smart but sometimes forgetfull." After the Indonesian government, in 1960, stopped publication of the magazine that serialized the work, the comic stopped running.
