= Legend of Tianyun Mountain =

- Film poster
- Directed by: Xie Jin
- Written by: Lu Yanzhou (novel)
- Starring: Wang Fuli; Shi Jianlan; Shi Weijian; Zhong Xinghuo
- Cinematography: Xu Qi
- Music by: Ge Yan
- Production company: Shanghai Film Studio
- Release date: December 1, 1980 (China)
- Running time: 126 minutes
- Country: People's Republic of China
- Language: Mandarin

Legend of Tianyun Mountain (simplified Chinese: 天云山传奇; traditional Chinese: 天雲山傳奇; pinyin: Tiānyúnshān chuánqí) is a 1980 Chinese drama film about the Chinese people's sufferings from the long-term political campaigns from "Anti-Rightists" in the 1950s until the fall of the Gang of Four. It depicts the individuals' hardship in the political turmoils and critically reflects the impact of that special history after the formation of the People's Republic of China. The film is based on the novel written by Lu Yanzhou, and was directed by Xie Jin (with Huang Shuqin serving as assistant director), starring Wang Fuli, Shi Weijian, Zhong Xinghuo and Shi Jianlan.

== Plot ==
In the early 1950s, Song Wei and Feng Qinglan, two female newly graduates from school, join Tianyun Mountain Exploration Team. Song falls in love with Luo Qun, the newly appointed political commissar. In spring of 1957, Song is sent to study in the Party school and joins the CCP. When these two plan to get married, the Anti-Rightist Movement breaks out, and Luo is classified as "rightist" and deprived of his post. Wu Yao, who leads the political campaign in Tianyun Mountain, forces Song to break up with Luo. Under the political pressure, Song sends Luo a farewell letter, and later, marries Wu. Luo is sent to do drudgery in a rural village. On the other hand, Feng, who has hidden her admiration and love for Luo, leaves the exploration team and comes to Luo. They get married, despite outside duress, and live an impoverished but content life.

20 years later and after the fall of Gang of Four, Wu becomes the vice Party chief and head of the organization department of the region, and Song is also elevated to vice director of the organization department, though she has no real power. One day, a young girl, Zhou Yuzhen, tells Song about her encounter with a coachman named Luo Qun in Tianyun Mountain, who is still a non-rehabilitated rightist. Song feels guilty and decides to rectify Luo's injustice by herself. But her husband, Wu, viciously interferes with the case. Song stands up to the resistance and appeals to higher-ranking officers, and finally, Luo's case is straightened out. When the good news comes, however, the flame of Feng's life extinguishes due to long-drawn-out hardship. In the end, from a distance Song sees Luo standing in silent tribute in front of the grave of Feng.

== Cast ==
- Wang Fuli as Song Wei
- Shi Weijian as Luo Qun
- Shi Jianlan as Feng Qinglan
- Zhong Xinghuo as Wu Yao
- Hong Xuemin as Zhou Yuzhen

== Themes ==
This was the first time director Xie Jin focused on the Anti-Rightist Movement. The film intensively examines the historic tragedy that honest people were mistakenly condemned as "rightist", while analyzing the politics, ethics and morality of the movement. It also mixes the characters' emotional changes with China's political atmosphere and social problems, which underscores these themes.

== Awards and nominations ==
Legend of Tianyun Mountain won the Best Picture, Best Director, Best Cinematography, and Best Art Design awards at the first Golden Rooster Awards in 1981. It shared the Best Picture award with Evening Rain, another film about the Cultural Revolution.
