= Gone with the Rainy Season =

Writings by Taiwanese author Sanmao

1991 Chinese edition

Gone with the Rainy Season (Chinese 雨季不再来) is a collection of early writings by Taiwanese author Sanmao published in 1976. Capitalising on the success of her Stories of the Sahara published earlier that year, the book collects stories she had written as a teenager and in her early twenties published under the name Chen Ping.

These semi-autobiographical stories draw on her solitary teenage years and time spent studying abroad. The title story tells of a young woman waiting for her boyfriend while the rain falls without cease.

In 2024, a musical composition by Rachel C. Walker and Autumn Yunting Tsai based on Sanmao's work entitled Gone with the Rainy Season was performed at Monopol Berlin.
