= The Tribulations of a Chinese Gentleman (film) =

- Film poster
- Traditional Chinese: 少爺的磨難
- Simplified Chinese: 少爷的磨难
- Literal meaning: Tribulations of the Young Master
- Hanyu Pinyin: Shàoyé de Mónàn
- German: Ein Chinese sucht seinen Mörder
- Directed by: Wu Yigong
- Written by: Ai Mingzhi; Si Minsan; Hans Borgelt
- Based on: Tribulations of a Chinaman in China by Jules Verne
- Starring: Chen Peisi; Rosalind Chao; Rolf Hoppe
- Cinematography: Xia Lixing
- Edited by: Shen Chuanti
- Music by: Qu Xiaosong
- Production companies: Shanghai Film Studio; Hessischer Rundfunk; Manfred Durniok Filmproduktion; Saarländischer Rundfunk
- Release date: December 25, 1987 (W. Germany)
- Running time: 126 minutes
- Countries: China; West Germany

The Tribulations of a Chinese Gentleman is a 1987 Chinese-German period film directed by Wu Yigong (Zhang Jianya is credited as a "co-director"), based on Jules Verne's novel of the same name. The film stars Chinese comic Chen Peisi, American actress Rosalind Chao, and German actor Rolf Hoppe.

== Cast ==
- Chen Peisi
- Rosalind Chao
- Rolf Hoppe
