= Evening Rain =

- Film poster
- Directed by: Wu Yonggang; Wu Yigong
- Written by: Ye Nan
- Starring: Li Zhiyu; Zhang Yu; Lin Bin
- Cinematography: Cao Weiye
- Music by: Gao Tian
- Production company: Shanghai Film Studio
- Release date: March 12, 1980 (China)
- Running time: 86 minutes
- Country: China
- Language: Mandarin

Evening Rain (Chinese: 巴山夜雨; pinyin: Ba shan ye yu) is a 1980 Chinese drama film which reflects the fight between Chinese people and the Gang of Four during the ten years of turmoil in China. It was directed by Wu Yonggang and Wu Yigong with Li Zhiyu, Zhang Yu, Lin Bin (林彬) playing the leading roles. This movie won the first Golden Rooster Awards for Best Picture in 1981, an award shared with Xie Jin's Legend of Tianyun Mountain.

== Plot ==
During the time the "Gang of Four" is on the rampage in China, a poet named Qiu Shi who has been in prison for 6 years is secretly transferred from Sichuan to Wuhan by boat under the guard of Li Yan and Liu Wenying. They meet six passengers on the boat – a poor girl named Xing Hua who has to sell herself as a bride, a just woman teacher, an old actor of Beijing Opera, a frail elderly woman who has just lost her son, a young worker who has a clear stand on what to love and what to hate, and a little girl in rags.

One night, feeling hopeless about her life, Xin Hua attempts suicide by jumping into the river. Qiu Shi saves her and uses his own experience to encourage the poor girl. All the people aboard are deeply moved by this brave poet, including Li Yan and Liu Wenying. It turns out that the girl in rags is Qiu Shi's daughter. With the help of the passengers aboard, Qiu Shi with his daughter finally regain freedom.

== Filming locations ==
- The Three Gorges

== Accolades ==
List of awards and nominations
| Award | Category | Nominee | Result |
|---|---|---|---|
| 1st Golden Rooster Awards | Best Picture | | Won |
| 1st Golden Rooster Awards | Best Director | Wu Yonggang; Wu Yigong | Nominated |
| 1st Golden Rooster Awards | Best Screenplay | Ye Nan | Won |
| 1st Golden Rooster Awards | Best Actor | Li Zhiyu | Nominated |
| 1st Golden Rooster Awards | Best Actress | Zhang Yu | Won |
| 1st Golden Rooster Awards | Best Ensemble Supporting Cast | Shi Ling; Ouyang Ruqiu; Mao Weihui; Lin Bin; Zhong Xinghuo; Lu Qing | Won |
| 1st Golden Rooster Awards | Best Original Score | Gao Tian | Won |
| 4th Hundred Flowers Awards | Best Picture | | Nominated |
| 4th Hundred Flowers Awards | Best Actress | Zhang Yu | Nominated |
