= The Adventures of Sanmao the Waif =

- Poster of the French edition
- Directed by: Yan Gong; Zhao Ming
- Written by: Zhang Leping (story); Yang Hansheng (screenplay)
- Starring: Wang Longji; Ding Ran; Guan Hongda; Lin Zhen; Du Lei
- Cinematography: Zhu Jinming; Han Zhongliang
- Edited by: Fu Zhengyi
- Music by: Wang Yunjie
- Production company: Kunlun Film Company
- Release date: December 1949 (China)
- Running time: 70 minutes
- Country: China
- Language: Mandarin

The Adventures of Sanmao the Waif (also known as The Winter of Three Hairs, Wanderings of Three-Hairs the Orphan or An Orphan on the Streets) (Chinese: 三毛流浪记; pinyin: San Mao liu lang ji) is a 1949 Chinese film produced by Kunlun Film Company, directed by Zhao Ming and Yan Gong, and written by Yang Hansheng, Chen Baichen, and Li Tianji. The 1949 film is based on the Sanmao comic, created by Zhang Leping in 1935, which features the well-known Chinese cultural symbol of child poverty, Sanmao (meaning "three hairs"), a homeless orphan boy. The film, which stars Wang Longji, follows Sanmao through his adventures surviving and meeting new people on the streets of Shanghai. The film notably works to counterbalance the tragic story of Sanmao with humor and comedy. Sanmao's visual image of a small boy with a big head and three hairs is well known amongst Chinese people both old and young.

== Plot ==
The film begins in Old Shanghai with a homeless orphan named Sanmao (Three Hairs). Constantly battling hunger and coldness, he sleeps in garbage carts and eats anything he can find. He tries to mimic the actions of other homeless children, earning money by selling newspapers and picking up cigarette butts. However, without any parents or a family, he has no one to teach him how to survive or succeed.

Sanmao comes across a group of street urchins who - after an initial fight - take him in and look out for him, while working together. The little earnings that he manages to make still have to be given to their “Little Boss.” Though Sanmao finds camaraderie and friendship with the group of homeless children, he still envies the children who can attend school and who have parents who will buy anything for them. However he stays optimistic and resilient, and works hard.

On Children's Day, Sanmao is intrigued by celebratory parades in the street. He hears announcers shouting that children are the future of the nation and claiming that all children should have rights to good health, education, warmth, comfort and should be loved, protected, and respected. But ironically Sanmao and his homeless friends are beaten and chased away from the celebration by policemen when they attempt to join the Boy Scouts marching in the parade.

One day Sanmao is blamed for stealing a wallet that he found and was trying to return, but he is saved by the “Big Boss.” Big Boss convinces Sanmao to work for him with Big Boss's other “apprentices” as a pickpocket. Sanmao feels guilty after stealing his first wallet and returns it to the owner, but he is thrown into a cell by the gang and left there for three days without food. Afterwards, the Big Boss and his wife dress Sanmao as if he were their son and take him to a department store to shoplift material. Upon being caught, they run away, leaving Sanmao behind. Sanmao escapes the pursuing shopkeepers and returns to the streets. Unable to continue living on the street, Sanmao tries to sell himself (at a far lower price than a doll pictured in a toy-shop window) and is bought by a selfish rich woman who wants to adopt a son. Sanmao is renamed "Tom" and he is given etiquette classes to prepare him for the upcoming celebration of his adoption (which takes place in November 1948). But Sanmao does not want to become a prim, proper, and obedient “son”. On the night of the celebration, Sanmao goes outside to have a moment alone, and he sees his homeless friends outside the gates. They are hungry and he lets them in to give them food. The homeless children overrun the party, which comes to a chaotic end, and Sanmao flees the lavish home along with the other boys.

Sanmao returns to his harsh life, but is at least free on the streets. His days continue as before, until the Chinese Communist Party (CCP) victory in the Chinese Civil War in October 1949. Sanmao and his homeless friends encounter the parade in the streets of Shanghai, with hordes of locals celebrating the liberation. The people march in the streets, carry banners of the CCP leaders’ faces, and shout, “Long live Chairman Mao!” Countless homeless orphans like Sanmao join the march on the street and dance and celebrate.

== Cast ==
- Sanmao (Three Hairs): Wang Longji
- Little Boss: Ding Ran
- Big Boss: Guan Hongda
- Rich Wife: Lin Zhen
- Rich Husband: Du Lei
- Little Ox: Wang Gongxu
- Auntie: Huang Chen
- Lao San: Yang Shaoqiao

== Inspiration ==
The film is based on the 1947 cartoon series of the same title. The film shares some scenes with and extends Sanmao's adventures after the end of Zhang Leping's comic-strip. Zhang Leping was one of the most-well-known cartoonists of modern China, as well as vice president and active member of the Cartoon Propaganda Corps (a group of popular Chinese cartoonists who used their art to rally citizens during the outbreak of war with Japan) Zhang began publicizing his comic series in the Shanghai daily newspaper, Shen Bao, in 1935 where it immediately garnered attention from the public. Zhang's serial comic ran in the paper during and after World War II for a total of 12 years. The left-leaning cartoonist often used his drawings to portray inequality in China between the lower classes and the elites and brought attention to child poverty with his illustrations. Zhang's approach to his cartoon belonged to a specific Chinese form of visual expression, called Manhua, which was shaped by “an intellectual and ideological turn towards nationalism, aesthetic syncretism, and specific internationalism”. Director Zhao Ming also sourced Charlie Chaplin's films as inspiration for The Adventures of Sanmao the Waif, with the goal being to make the movie enjoyable for educated and uneducated people.

== Themes ==
Like the original comic, the film aimed to satirize and call out the apathetic actions and attitude towards child poverty that was held by many people during the 1930s and 1940s, as well as criticize the injustice and cruelty towards the poor in the old society. It extols the “Sanmao Spirit” of being strong, kind, optimistic, warm, and humorous even under challenging circumstances. Though the homeless character was not a new theme at this time, Zhang created a child character who retains his innocence and sense of moral justice despite his unfortunate circumstances. Sanmao's innocent optimism and sense of justice are large themes in The Adventures of Sanmao the Waif, seen in Sanmao's desire to go to school or when he returns the wallet after pickpocketing it.

The Adventures of Sanmao the Waif shows the lives of orphans, the “wandering children”, who struggle to survive on the streets in 1940s Shanghai. The “San Mao” character was a unique product of the Shanghai local culture of the time. The film depicts scenes representative of Shanghai urban modernity: the Shanghai dialects, the parades on the street, the police, the multitudes of homeless children scattered amongst the street corners. It highlights the inequality among children in the 1940s when Sanmao and his orphans friends were not allowed to celebrate Children's day with the richer children, despite the slogan "Children are the protagonists of the state's future! We must cherish the children and respect them!" In this scene, Sanmao wants to join the Boy Scout parade and prompts his homeless friends to join them, but unfortunately, they are chased away by the police. This scene alludes to the irony of China's supposed policies of protecting and supporting all children, as homeless children of lower classes are shunned from public celebrations and discriminated against by police officers. The Children's Day parade scene contains comedic elements as well as an important opportunity for Sanmao's character development. Zhao Ming affirmed this scene as crucial to the plot of the film. Ultimately, the film and this scene critique the Kuomintang government's inability to adequately support poorer children as well as bring attention to the tendency for impoverished children to be treated much more negatively than children of wealthier backgrounds.

The film uses comedy to criticize the injustice of the old society. The film's power comes largely from over exaggeration. For example, the famous sequence where the rich lady holds a party for Sanmao but Sanmao causes a farce with a group of homeless kids, is shadowing resistance against social norms in the old society. Unlike other films such as Myriad of Lights, which uses strict realism and tragedy to reveal the miserable destiny of the lower class, The Adventures of Sanmao the Waif adopts the form of romantic exaggerated comedy to express this theme.

The last parade scene where a dancer invites Sanmao and other vagrant children to leave the sidelines and join in the celebration, contrasts with the earlier Children's Day parade scene where Sanmao and his friends are chased away and beaten by the police after attempting to join the marching Boy Scouts. This contrast implies that the Old Society rejects this group of homeless youths, while New China embraces them. This ending scene of the film diverges from Zhang Leping's original serial comic in that it introduces overt support for the CCP, turning the character of Sanmao into a symbol of political liberation and social justice.

== Background ==
=== Zhang Leping ===
The creator of the original 1935 Sanmao comic, Zhang Leping, originated from a humble background, only attending a few years of elementary school. He gained experience as an apprentice in Shanghai later in his life and took courses at a professional school. Sources of Zhang's thought process when writing and creating the Sanmao series could be found in the prefaces of his comic strips. These introductions gave valuable insight into the political thought of Zhang as well as the goals he wished to achieve with the Sanmao comics. Unlike cartoonists such as Feng Zikai, Zhang did not keep diaries or essays about his artistic work, making the introductions of his comic strips vital to the understanding of his work.

Zhang Leping also displayed his artistic ideas through his contribution to published debates about comic art in specialized magazines. His son, Zhang Weijun, along with other of Leping's family members collected pictures, documents and the original Sanmao picture story books, which they made available to the public on the official Sanmao website. In recognition of his works, the Zhang Leping Memorial Hall was built in 1995 in the artist's hometown of Haiyan 海鹽, in which guests are able to visit the original physical pieces and art.

Zhang Leping also made major contributions to child advocacy in late 1940s Shanghai. On Children's Day preceding the film's release, he collaborated with Song Qingling to open a special exhibition and successful fundraising event, featuring sketches from The Wandering Life of Sanmao. He also auctioned off a set of watercolours, with proceeds going to the Shanghai Children's Programme of Song Qingling's China Welfare Fund. Attendees could donate goods and pledge financial support by becoming members of the “Sanmao Paradise Club”.

=== Production and political pressure ===
The film was produced and developed by Kunlun Film Company, a Shanghai company founded in May 1947 and established as a replacement for Lianhua Film Company which previously shut down due to extensive interference of the National Party. Having released several left-leaning themed films before 1949, like "Crows and Sparrows" (乌鸦与麻雀, 1949), "The Spring River Flows East" (一江春水向东流, 1947) and "Eight Thousand Li of Cloud and Moon" (八千里路云和月, 1947), Kunlun Film Company's engagement in the production of The Adventures of Sanmao the Waif confirmed that the movie would implement politically charged content. The film was made during the company's post war era, which was distinguished by “their urgent sense of political intervention, their emphasis on realistic representation (instead of idealistic in the 1930s) and their willingness to reach out to the masses”. Left-wing screenwriter Yang Hansheng, with revisions from Chen Baichen and Li Tianji, developed the initial script for the film but director Zhao Ming changed much of it, believing that the original script was too dramatic and divergent from Zhang Leping's original comic strips. Zhao Ming mentioned that he aimed to create a balance between light-hearted, humorous tones and the serious, tragic events that Sanmao experiences.

With development beginning in October 1948, the film's release was originally planned for release in the same year, but it was banned by the Kuomintang. In the initial stages of the film's production, Zhao Ming received an anonymous threatening letter, presumably from Kuomintang, which read, “If Sanmao carries on, you will have to watch your head.” Zhang Leping, who actively participated in the film's production received the same message a few days later. It was cleared for screening only after the People's Liberation Army took over Shanghai in October 1949. During this delay, a scene was added in which Sanmao experiences a turn of fortune concurrent with the political change. The director explains in his memoirs that the new ending was produced in haste, in the fervor of Shanghai's liberation and in the wake of shifting political circumstances in China. Premiering in December 1949, The Adventures of Sanmao the Waif became one of the first feature films to be screened after the creation of the People's Republic of China.

Since 1949, because of the political and revolutionary backgrounds in contemporary China, almost all the films had been produced among six major motifs:

1) praise and loyalty to Mao and the CCP,

2) revolution and class struggle,

3) comparison between the new and old society,

4) heroes and models,

5) love and family ties, and

6) backwardness and progress.

The latter five motifs all served the first one, praise and loyalty to Mao and the CCP. It was this idea that raised patriotism and nationalism, and formulated absolute standards in the political sense for the other five motifs.

The initial two versions of the film's ending did not feature the celebration of liberation. After the liberation of Shanghai in May 1949, Xia Yan, Director of the Art Department of Shanghai Military Management Committee, recommended adding the celebration parade that featured portraits of Mao Zedong and Zhu De.

== Release and screenings ==
Location	Year	
China	1949	Release
China	1958	Reissue
China	1980	Reissue
France	1981	Cannas Film Festival
Hong Kong	1981	
Germany	1982	Mannheim Film Festival
Portugal	1983	Figueira da Foz Film Festival
China	2019	Shanghai Film Festival (4k restored version)

== Critical reception ==
The Adventures of Sanmao the Waif received both domestic and international acclaim.

It was one of few films made with young audiences in mind, but appealed to many age groups, nationalities, and social classes. The film drew crowds from Hong Kong and Paris in as late as 1981. This phenomenon was termed by Voice of America as “a Sanmao Craze.”

After the Cultural Revolution in China, there was great interest in Chinese cinema from the late 1970s to the early 1980s. In order to draw attention to these films, Europe began screening Chinese films. Jean Florenzano bought the distribution rights to The Adventures of Sanmao the Waif and four other films including Street Angel (Yuan Muzhi, 1937), Crossroads (Shen Xiling, 1937), The Monkey King (Wan Laiming, 1961), and Troubled Laughter (Yang Yanjin, 1979) to help bring more exposure to Chinese cinema. The Adventures of Sanmao the Waif was screened at the Cannes Film Festival in 1981, as part of a special program, “Images Du Cinema Chinois”, that highlighted the shift of Chinese cultural politics towards an international market. The film was also screened at the International Film Festival Rotterdam in 1987.

== Awards ==
In 1983, the film won the Jury Award at the 12th Figueira Da Foz International Film Festival of Portugal.

In 1984, the film won the Special Mention Award at the 14th Giffoni International Film Festival of Italy.

== Legacy ==
The 1949 film Wanderings of Three-Hairs the Orphan has had an impact on Chinese culture and cinema, various aspects of media, education, and cultural remembrance. It is considered as one of the earliest narrative films in China to depict the intertwined themes of social transformation before and after liberation and the fate of children. Wanderings of Sanmao has been recognized as a representative work of early “New China cinema.” Educators frequently employ the film to delve into social issues and historical contexts, offering insights into poverty, inequality, and resilience in Chinese society. Scholars continue to dissect the film's portrayal of societal issues, emphasizing its role in shaping cultural narratives and its enduring relevance.

Sanmao remains a beloved figure, with the film's presence in exhibitions. The film has undergone multiple restorations and re-releases, most notably a 4K restored screening at the 2019 Shanghai International Film Festival.

== Further adaptations ==
Since its 1949 release, Wanderings of Three-Hairs the Orphan has sparked numerous adaptations across media. Live-action films including Sanmao Runs a Business (Huang Zuolin, 1958), San Mao Joins the Army (Zhang Jianya, 1992), and San Mao: The Orphan's Journey (2006). Animated adaptations such as The Adventures of San Mao (1949) and the San Mao Animation Series (1984). There have also been stage plays and musicals. Additionally, a TV series named Sanmao (1998) has earned acclaim for its fidelity to Zhang Leping's work.
