= Zhang Jianya =

Chinese film director (born 1951)

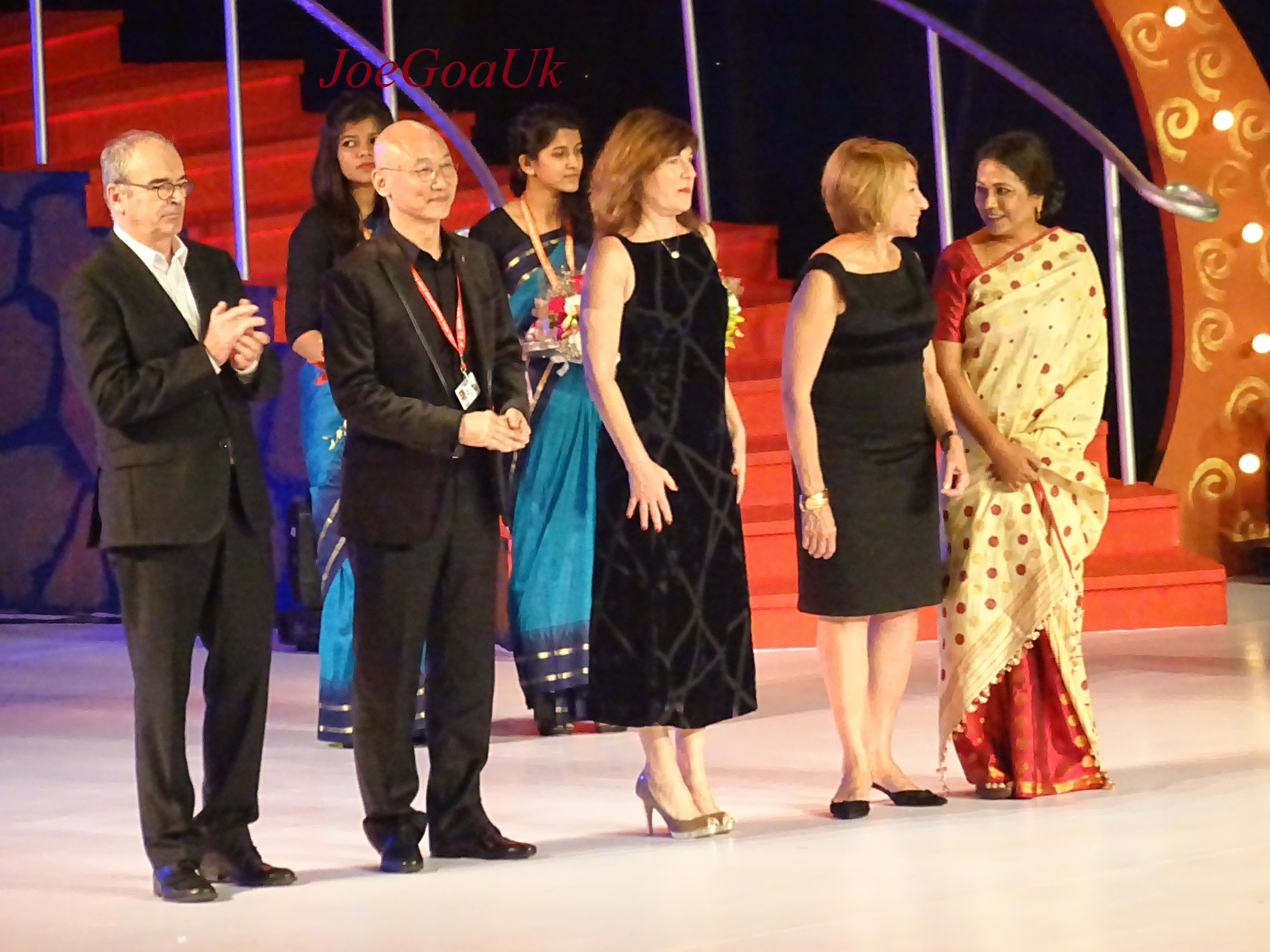
- Jianya (center) at IFFI 2014
- Born: 1951 (age 74–75); Putian, China
- Occupations: Film director and producer
- Years active: 1980s-present

Chinese name
- Traditional Chinese: 张建亚
- Simplified Chinese: 張建亞
Transcriptions
Standard Mandarin
- Hanyu Pinyin: Zhāng Jiànyà

Zhang Jianya (Chinese: 张建亚, pronounced [ʈʂɑ́ŋ tɕi̯ɛ̂ni̯â]) (born 1951) is a Chinese film director. As a graduate of the 1982 class of the Beijing Film Academy, Zhang is a founding member of the so-called Fifth Generation, a group that also includes in its numbers directors such as Zhang Yimou, Chen Kaige, and Tian Zhuangzhuang.

== Directorial career ==
Trained as a carpenter, Zhang's cinematic career began when he joined the Shanghai Film Studio in the mid-1970s as an actor. Upon his graduation in 1982, Zhang directed the children's film, Red Elephant, with his classmates, Tian, and Xie Xiaojing, and helped the studio head Wu Yigong direct the 1987 West German co-production, The Tribulations of Young Master. Beginning with 1988's Kidnapping Karajan, Zhang has carved himself a niche with urban comedies, often based in the city of Shanghai.

Zhang Jianya has also expanded his interests into producing in his role as the head of the 3rd Creative Group at the Shanghai Film Studio, as well as into other genres, including action-thrillers such as 1999's Crash Landing and 2002's Red Snow.

== Selected filmography ==
=== As director ===
Year	English Title	Chinese Title	Notes
1982	Red Elephant	红象	Co-directed with Tian Zhuangzhuang and Xie Xiaojing
1986	Trapped in a Frozen River	冰河死亡线	Solo-debut; also known as Ice River
1987	The Tribulations of Young Master	少爷的磨难	Co-directed with Wu Yigong
1988	Kidnapping Karajan	绑架卡拉扬	
1992	San Mao Joins the Army	三毛从军记	
1993	Mr. Wang: Flames of Desire	王先生之欲火焚身	
1994	Narrow Escape	绝境逢生	
1999	Crash Landing	紧急迫降	
2000	Happy Angels	开心哆来咪	
2003	Red Snow	極地營救	
2007	Call for Love	爱情呼叫转移	
2007	The Dream is Alive	东方大港	
2008	Fit Lover	爱情呼叫转移2: 爱情左右	
2014	My Amazing Trip to India		First Chinese film on India
