= Crash Landing (1999 film) =

- Film poster
- Directed by: Zhang Jianya
- Written by: Hao Jian
- Produced by: Zhu Yongde; Li Dianliang
- Starring: Shao Bing; Xu Fan; You Yong
- Cinematography: Yang Tao
- Edited by: Sun Huimin
- Music by: Pan Guoxing
- Production company: Shanghai Film Studio
- Release date: 1999
- Running time: 114 minutes
- Country: China
- Languages: Mandarin; English

Crash Landing (simplified Chinese: 紧急迫降; traditional Chinese: 緊急迫降; pinyin: Jǐnjí pòjiàng; lit. 'Emergency forced landing') is a 1999 Chinese thriller film directed by Zhang Jianya.

A Shanghai Film Studio production, Crash Landing follows the contours of many airplane disaster films, such as the Airport series, and stars Shao Bing, Xu Fan, and You Yong.

== Plot ==
Crash Landing follows the tense hours on board a stricken passenger aircraft that was on a routine flight from Shanghai to Beijing. Shortly after taking off, the pilot (Shao Bing) discovers that the plane's landing gear is unable to be retracted. Unable to continue, but unable to land, he and his flight attendant wife (Xu Fan), are forced to circle Shanghai.

Meanwhile, on the ground, a troubleshooter (You Yong) is called to see if he can get the aircraft safely back on the ground.

== Inspiration ==
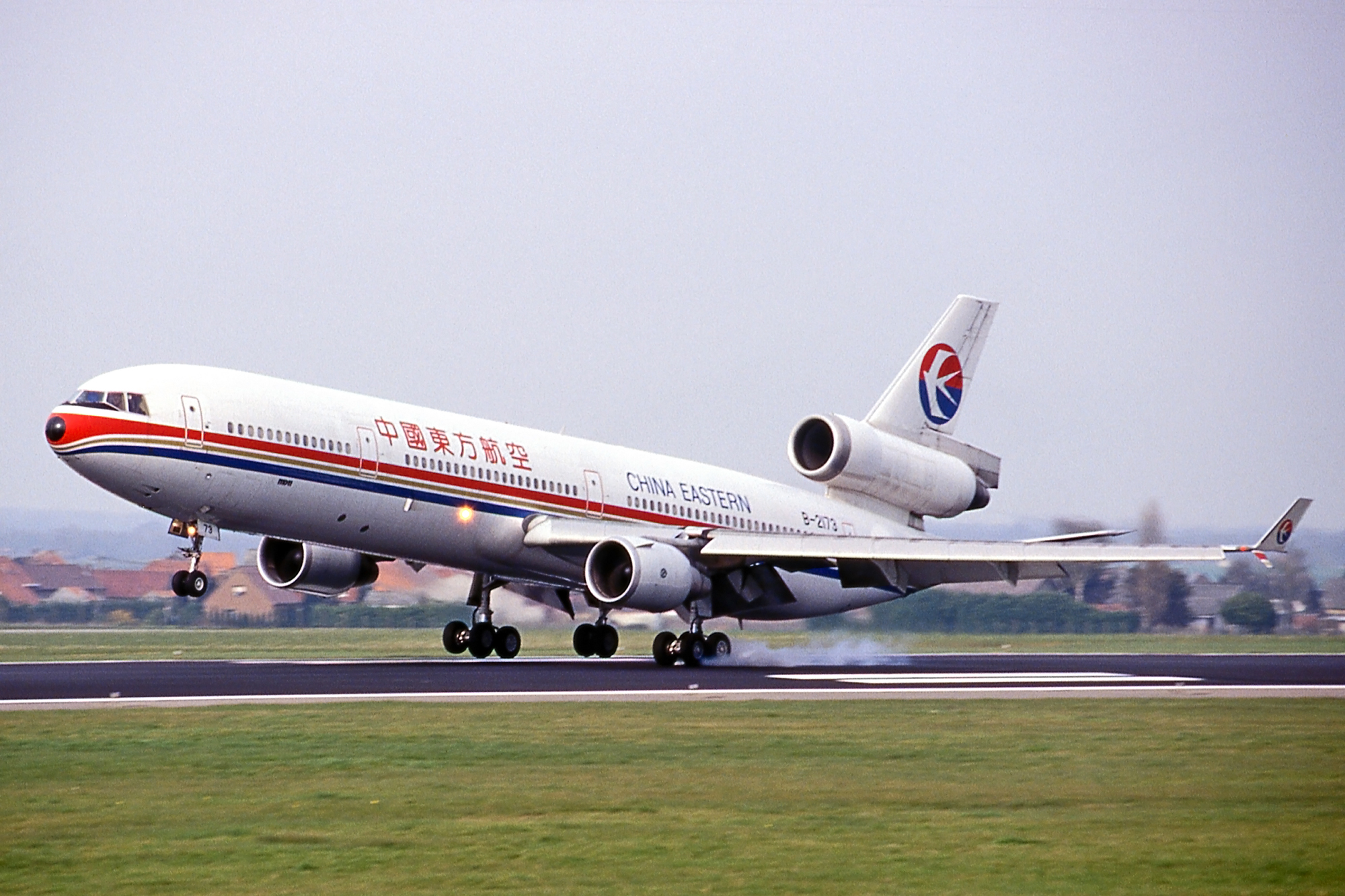
The aircraft involved in the related accident, registration B-2173

The film is inspired by the first emergency landing in China. On September 10, 1998, China Eastern Airlines Flight 586, a McDonnell-Douglas MD-11 flying from Shanghai Hongqiao International Airport to Los Angeles International Airport via Beijing Capital International Airport, suffered a nose gear failure after taking off from Shanghai. The aircraft landed back in Shanghai Hongqiao with the nose gear up on a foamed runway, with no fatality among 137 people onboard.

== Reception ==
Due to the film's scale and budget, Crash Landing was seen upon its release as a prime example of the growing sophistication of China's mainstream film industry, with one western media review calling it "one giant leap for Chinese cinema."
