= Zhao Ming =

Zhao Ming may refer to:

- Xiao Tong (萧统), formally Crown Prince Zhao Ming (昭明太子), son of Emperor Wu of the Liang Dynasty (502-577) compiler of the Zhao Ming essays, the first anthology of essays in China
- Zhao Ming of Shang, the second ruler of Predynastic Shang.
- Zhao Ming, film director; director of The Adventures of Sanmao the Waif (1949)
- Zhao Ming (footballer, born 1984) (赵铭 born 1984), Chinese football player
- Zhao Ming (footballer, born 1987) (赵铭 born 1987), Chinese football player
- Zhao Ming (actress) (赵铭 1987), Chinese actress who appears in the film Let the Bullets Fly 2010
