= Yang Hansheng =

Chinese screenwriter

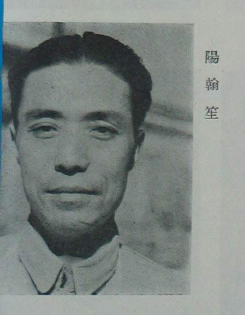
- Born: November 2, 1902; Gao County, China
- Died: June 7, 1993 (aged 90); Beijing, China
- Occupations: Screenwriter, playwright, writer
- Years active: 1930s–1970s

Yang Hansheng
- Chinese: 阳翰笙
Transcriptions
Standard Mandarin
- Hanyu Pinyin: Yáng Hànshēng
Yue: Cantonese
- Yale Romanization: Yeung4 Hon6 Sang1

Yang Hansheng (阳翰笙, Yáng Hànshēng; November 2, 1902 – June 7, 1993) was a Chinese screenwriter, playwright and writer, also known under the pseudonym Huahan (华汉, Huáhàn).

== Biography ==
Born as Ouyang Benyi (欧阳本义, Ōuyáng Běnyì), he joined the Chinese Communist Party in 1925 and was very active in revolutionary propaganda, writing numerous political dramas and screenplays, especially during the Second Sino-Japanese War from 1933 as a member of the Shanghai Yihua Film Company. He also held various political posts in the party and trade associations related to the revolutionary Left environment.

With the birth of the People's Republic of China, he was secretary general and vice-president of the China Federation of Literary and Art Circles, working closely with the head of government Zhou Enlai in the field of cultural policies.

Among his most significant works are the screenplays for the films Myriad of Lights, directed by Shen Fu (1948), and The Adventures of Sanmao the Waif, directed by Zhao Ming and Yan Gong (1949).

In 1966 he was arrested because of the Cultural Revolution, returning to writing only in 1977, after the death of Mao Zedong. After his release from prison, he was reinstated as Vice Chairman of the China Federation of Literary and Artistic Circles and chaired its daily work. He died in Beijing in 1993 at the age of 90.
