= The Desert Island =

- Film poster
- Directed by: Wu Yonggang
- Written by: Wu Yonggang
- Produced by: Lai Man-Wai
- Starring: Jin Yan; Zhang Zhizhi
- Cinematography: Hong Weilie
- Production company: Lianhua Film Company
- Release date: November 3, 1936 (China)
- Running time: 68 minutes
- Country: China
- Language: Mandarin

The Desert Island (Chinese: 浪淘沙; pinyin: Lang tao sha), also known as Waves Wash the Sand, is a 1936 Chinese crime thriller film directed by Wu Yonggang.

== Cast ==
- Jin Yan
- Zhang Zhizhi
