= Control (2013 film) =

2013 Chinese-Hong Kong film by Kenneth Bi

- Film poster
- Directed by: Kenneth Bi
- Written by: Kenneth Bi
- Produced by: Wang Zhonglei; Stephen Fung; Henry Fong; Stephen Lam; Rosa Li; Daniel Wu
- Starring: Daniel Wu; Yao Chen; Simon Yam; Leon Dai; Ady An; Shao Bing
- Cinematography: Roman Jakobi
- Edited by: Kenneth Bi
- Music by: Dan the Automator; Andre Matthias
- Production companies: Sil-Metropole Organisation; Huayi Brothers; Celestial Pictures; Media Asia Films; Le Vision Pictures
- Distributed by: Sil-Metropole Organisation
- Release dates: 22 November 2013 (China); 16 January 2014 (Hong Kong)
- Running time: 90 minutes
- Countries: China; Hong Kong
- Language: Mandarin
- Box office: $7,020,000

Control (Chinese: 控制) is a 2013 crime thriller film, directed by Kenneth Bi and starring Daniel Wu, Yao Chen, Simon Yam, Leon Dai, Ady An and Shao Bing. A Chinese-Hong Kong co-production, the film was released on 22 November 2013 in mainland China and on 16 January 2014 in Hong Kong.

== Plot ==
In a technologically advanced but morally corrupt floating city, diligent insurance agent Mark has been living with his schizophrenic mother for many years. However, his tranquil life is shattered by a mysterious phone call. To raise money for his ailing mother, Mark is forced to commit perjury in exchange for a hefty reward. Believing everything to be seamless, Mark soon discovers that a "mysterious person" knows about his actions and blackmails him into doing his bidding. During this ordeal, Mark reunites with his high school sweetheart, Jessie, who now works at a bank. Together, they decide to escape the control of the mysterious person. Little do they know, Jessie is also entangled in the web spun by the mysterious person, and their fates are tightly bound together. As Mark becomes implicated in a crime involving the mafia boss Tai Ge's dirty money, a shocking conspiracy begins to unravel, and the "mysterious person" is finally revealed. However, in the process of seeking revenge, Mark realizes he has fallen into an even greater danger.

== Cast ==
- Daniel Wu as Mark
- Yao Chen as Jessica
- Simon Yam as Tiger
- Leon Dai as Devil
- Ady An as Mimi
- Shao Bing as Sam
