= Spring Symphony (film) =

1983 film

- Directed by: Peter Schamoni
- Written by: Peter Schamoni
- Produced by: Wolfgang Hammerschmidt; Ralph T. Niemeyer; Peter Schamoni
- Starring: Nastassja Kinski; Herbert Grönemeyer; Rolf Hoppe
- Cinematography: Gérard Vandenberg
- Edited by: Elfie Tillack
- Music by: Herbert Grönemeyer
- Production companies: Allianz Filmproduktion; Berliner Filmförderung; Peter Schamoni Film
- Distributed by: Warner-Columbia Filmverleih
- Release date: 8 April 1983
- Running time: 103 minutes
- Country: West Germany
- Language: German

Spring Symphony (German: Frühlingssinfonie) is a 1983 West German historical drama film directed by Peter Schamoni and starring Nastassja Kinski, Herbert Grönemeyer, and Rolf Hoppe. It portrays the life of the pianist Clara Wieck and her relationship with the composer Robert Schumann.

The film's sets were designed by the art director Alfred Hirschmeier. It was shot at the Tempelhof Studios in Berlin and on location in various places in Saxony including Dresden, Leipzig and Zwickau.

== Cast ==
- Nastassja Kinski as Clara Wieck
- Rolf Hoppe as Friedrich Wieck
- Herbert Grönemeyer as Robert Schumann
- Anja-Christine Preussler as Clara as a Child
- Edda Seippel as Schumann's mother
- André Heller as Felix Mendelssohn
- Gidon Kremer as Paganini
- Bernhard Wicki as Baron von Fricken
- Gerda Rimpler as Baronin von Fricken
- Sonya Tuchmann as Baronesse von Fricken
- Margit Geissler as Christel
- Uwe Müller as Becker
- Inge Marschall as Clemenza Wieck
- Helmut Oskamp as Alwin Wieck
- Wolfgang Greese as Presiding Judge
- Gesa Thoma as Nanni
- Kitty Mattern as Princess Starnitz
- Walter Schuster as Professor Fischhof
- Peter Schamoni as Härtel
- H.G. Röhrig as Dorn
- Friedrich W. Bauschulte as Student
- Gerd Holtenau as Attorney at Law
- Marie Colbin as Parisian Lady

== Bibliography ==
- Mitchell, Charles P. (2004). The Great Composers Portrayed on Film, 1913 through 2002. Jefferson, NC: McFarland. ISBN 978-0-7864-1795-7.
