= Wang Fuli =

Chinese actress (born 1949)

- Born: 12 November 1949 (age 75)
- Awards: Golden Rooster Awards – Best Supporting Actress; 1986 Sunrise Hundred Flowers Awards – Best Supporting Actress; 1984 Our Niu Baisui; 1986 Sunrise Golden Eagle Awards – Best Actress; 1995 Xiao Lou Feng Jing

Chinese name
- Traditional Chinese: 王馥荔
- Simplified Chinese: 王馥荔
Transcriptions
Yue: Cantonese
- Jyutping: wong4 fuk1 lai6

Wang Fuli (Chinese: 王馥荔; born 12 November 1949) is a Chinese actress.

Wang was born in Xuzhou, Jiangsu Province, and her ancestral hometown was Tianjin. She graduated from Jiangsu Drama College in 1967, majoring in Peking Opera. Wang later served as an actress of Jiangsu Provincial Peking Opera Troupe. In 1980, she became an actress of Jiangsu Provincial Play Troupe. After 1975, she appeared a series of films presented by Changchun Film Studio and Shanghai Film Studio. Wang made her breakthrough in 1980 in the film Legend of Tianyun Mountain, for which she nominated Golden Rooster Award for Best Actress. In 1984, she acted as "Juhua" in Za Men De Niu Bai Sui and won the 7th Hundred Flowers Awards for Best Supporting Actress. In 1985, her performance in Sunrise as "Cuixi" won the 9th Hundred Flowers Awards for Best Supporting Actress and 6th Golden Rooster Awards for Best Supporting Actress in 1986. She also appeared in a couple of TV series, including "Scenery from Pavilion". In 1994 she appeared in Huang Jianxin's film, The Wooden Man's Bride.

Wang was a councilor of 5th Chinese Film Association, and the vice chairwoman of CFA Jiangsu committee.

== Filmography ==
- Golden Path I (1975)
- Golden Path II (1976)
- Horizon of Blue Sea (1979)
- Legend of Tianyun Mountain (1980)
- Xu Mao and His Daughters (1981)
- Romance of Blacksmith Zhang (1982)
- Our Niu Baisui (1983)
- Qiu Jin: A Revolutionary (1984)
- Sunrise (1985)
- The Men's World (1987)
- God of the Mountains (1992)
- The Wooden Man's Bride (1994)
- The Calligraphy Master (2015)
