= Shao Bing =

Chinese actor (born 1968)

- Born: 15 February 1968 (age 58); Hangzhou, Zhejiang, China
- Occupation: Actor

Chinese name
Transcriptions
Standard Mandarin
- Hanyu Pinyin: Shào Bīng
Yue: Cantonese
- Jyutping: Siu^{6} Bing^{1}

Shao Bing (邵兵) is a Chinese actor who has won a Huabiao Award.

== Filmography ==
=== Films ===
Year	Title	Role	Notes
1996	The Winner (贏家)		Nominated—Golden Rooster Award for Best Actor
1997	Spicy Love Soup (愛情麻辣烫)	photographer	
1998	Red River Valley (紅河谷)	Gasang	
1998	Rhapsody of Spring (春天的狂想)	Zhao Liming	Won—Huabiao Award for Outstanding Actor
1999	Crash Landing (緊急迫降)	Pilot Li	
1999	My Heart Will Go On (還我情心)		
2002	Red Snow (極地營救)		
2003	T.R.Y.		
2004	Fight for Justice (決戰梟雄)		
2005	The Myth (神話)	Nangong Yan	
2005	Sunrise, Sunset (日出日落)	Xia Zhi	
2008	The Butterfly Lovers (劍蝶)	General Tie	
2009	Give Love (愛得起)	Hilton	
2010	Let the Bullets Fly (讓子彈飛)	Two	
2010	Beyond the Sacred Land (聖地額濟納)		
2010	If You Are the One II (非誠勿擾2)	Li Jianqiang	
2011	Treasure Hunt (無價之寶)	Star	
2011	The Lost Bladesman (關雲長)	Zhang Liao	
2012	Happiness (幸福)		
2013	Saving General Yang (忠烈楊家將)	Yelü Yuan	
2013	Control	Sam	
2014	Breaking the Waves		
2014	Night of Adventure		
2015	Baby, Sorry		
2018	Bad Daddy		
2018	Father and Hero		
2019	Looking Up		

=== Television ===
Year	Title	Role	Notes
2004	Assassinator Jing Ke (荊軻傳奇)	Ying Zheng	
2007	The Sword And The Chess of Death (魔劍生死棋)		
2011	The Legend of Incorruptible Stone (廉石传奇)		
2013	The Patriot Yue Fei (精忠岳飛)	Han Shizhong	
2016	Ice Fantasy	Ice King	
2019	Arsenal Military Academy 烈火军校	Guo Shuting	
2020	" Cross Fire"	Lu Tian Ming	
2021	Wisher 致命愿望	Qiu Ke Fan	
