= Ru Zhijuan =

Chinese writer

- Born: October 30, 1925; Shanghai, Republic of China
- Died: October 7, 1998 (aged 72); Shanghai, People's Republic of China
- Spouse: Wang Xiaoping (王啸平)
- Children: 3, including Wang Anyi
- Writing career
- Language: Chinese
- Notable work: "Lilies" (1958)

Chinese name
- Traditional Chinese: 茹志鵑
- Simplified Chinese: 茹志鹃
Transcriptions
Standard Mandarin
- Hanyu Pinyin: Rú Zhìjuān
- Wade–Giles: Ju^{2} Chih^{4}-chüan^{1}

Ru Zhijuan (Wade–Giles: Ju Chih-chüan, 30 October 1925 – 7 October 1998) was a Chinese writer best known for her short stories. Ru was one of the most important writers of her generation. Her second daughter Wang Anyi is also a famous writer.

== Biography ==
Ru Zhijuan, the youngest of 5 children, was born in Shanghai to migrants from Hangzhou. When she was 3, her mother died and her father left; she and a brother were raised by their grandmother. She did not begin primary school until age 10, and a year later moved to Hangzhou with her grandmother, who died shortly after. She was sent to an orphanage in Shanghai. After a year each at a women's vocational school, a Christian missionary boarding school for girls, and a county school, she graduated from secondary school with only four years of schooling. She taught school for a short time in 1943 before joining the propaganda division of the New Fourth Army. In 1944, she married Wang Xiaoping, who was born in Singapore but arrived in China to fight the Japanese during the Second Sino-Japanese War. In 1947, she joined the Chinese Communist Party.

In 1955, she became the editor of the Monthly for Literature and Art, retiring in 1960 to write full-time.

In 1960, Ru published All Quiet in the Maternity Clinic, which was republished in a collection of the same name in 1962 and which received significant literary attention and analysis. Its setting in the maternity clinic of a people's commune was notable for being an uncommon site in other labor narratives of the period. The short story depicts the arrival of Sister He, a modern-trained midwife from the city, and Auntie Tan, and older midwife at the clinic. Largely narrated from Auntie Tan's perspective, All Quiet in the Maternity Clinic's narrative addresses the tensions and disagreements between the two nurses, with Auntie Tan's life experience in pre-liberation China resulting in her skepticism of Sister He's modern methods.

The 1958 short story "Lilies" was criticized by some for its "bourgeois sentimentality" but became popular after it was praised by Minister of Culture and author Mao Dun. Many of her stories of this period were intended to show popular support for the revolution and the communist party. She also dealt with the changes in Chinese society from traditional values. She did not publish any work from 1962 to 1965, because it was felt at the time that her work dealt with the worries of everyday people rather than more important issues.

She regained favour when the values from the Cultural Revolution were being reconsidered. They are generally critical of earlier policies and promote the new social norms.

She served as Chinese Communist Party Committee Secretary for the Shanghai Writer's Association. She died in Shanghai at the age of 73.

Her daughter Wang Anyi also became a prominent writer.

== Works translated into English ==
Year	Chinese title	Translated English title	Translator(s)
1958	百合花	"The Lilies on a Comforter"	Kai-yu Hsu
1958	百合花	"Lilies"	R. A. Roberts
1958	百合花	"Lilies"	Robert E. Hegel
1959	澄河边上	"On the Banks of the Cheng"	Gladys Yang
1959	春暖时节	"The Warmth of Spring"	
1959	春暖时节	"The Warmth of Spring"	Sabina Knight
1959	如愿	"A Promise Is Kept"	Yu Fanqin
1960	静静的产院	"The Maternity Home"	Tang Sheng
1961	三走严庄	"A Third Visit to Yanzhuang"	Qin Sheng
1961	同志之间	"Comradeship"	Gladys Yang
1961	阿舒	"Just a Happy-Go-Lucky Girl"	Wen Xue
1961	在那东海边上	"Between Two Seas"	Zhang Su
1962	第二步	"The Beginning of Tomorrow"	Zhang Su
1979	剪辑错了的故事	"A Story Out of Sequence"	Tian Fan, John Minford
1979	剪辑错了的故事	"A Badly Edited Story"	Wang Mingjie
1979	草原上的小路	"The Path Through the Grassland"	Yu Fanqin
1980	儿女情	"Sons and Successors"	Ellen Klempner
1980	儿女情	"My Son, My Son"	Nancy Lee
1980	我写〈百合花〉的经过	"How I Came to Write 'Lilies on a Comforter'"	John Balcom

== Filmography ==
Year	English title	Chinese title	Notes
1960	Their Wishes	她们的心愿	Segment 3: "Just Mention Your Need" (只要你说一声需要)
1961	Spring Hastens the Blossoms Blooming	春催桃李	Co-wrote with Ai Mingzhi

== Major awards ==
- 1980: 2nd National Short Story Prize, "A Story Out of Sequence" ("A Badly Edited Story")
