= Stories of the Sahara =

Autobiographical work of the Taiwanese writer Sanmao

- First English-language edition (publ. Bloomsbury UK)
- Author: Sanmao
- Language: Standard Chinese
- Genre: Memoir; travel writing
- Publisher: Crown Culture
- Publication date: 1976
- Publication place: Western Sahara
- ISBN: 978-957-33-0554-5
- OCLC: 284729268

Stories of the Sahara (Chinese: 《撒哈拉的故事》; pinyin: Sāhālā de gùshi) is an autobiographical account of the life and love of the Taiwanese author Sanmao while she was living in the Sahara Desert with her Spanish husband Jose Maria Quero y Ruiz. It was first published in book form in 1976, although some of the earlier stories were published in Taiwan's United Daily News as early as 1974.

In the work, she describes her encounters and neighbourly relationships with the Sahrawis, the local indigenous people of Western Sahara amongst whom she and her husband lived in close proximity; her adventures in exploring the Saharan desert; and her relationship with her husband, whom she married in 1973 in Western Sahara after successfully progressing through protracted bureaucratic red tape with the colonial Spanish authorities.

Stories of the Sahara is San Mao's first published collection of stories. Part travelogue, part memoir and a valentine to her husband and marriage in a foreign land, it quickly established Sanmao as a travel writer with a unique voice and perspective. It was met with immediate success, and reprinted four times within a month and a half of its first print-run. It remains extremely popular with Chinese-language readers across Taiwan, Mainland China and Hong Kong.

In a study on the wave of enthusiasm for Taiwanese music and literature that swept China in the 1980s, Hongwei Lu notes that "San Mao’s travel accounts of foreign cultures and life experiences gathered through her living and studying abroad provided post-Mao China with a taste of multiculturalism, and suggested the possibility of not only an expanded consciousness of the world, but a transformation of the way people think about the world and the possibility of being part of it."

Rights to the English-language translations were acquired by Bloomsbury Publishing from Crown Culture, and the British and American editions were scheduled to be published in 2019 and 2020, respectively.
