= Zhang Leping =

Chinese cartoonist (1910–1992)

Zhang Leping 张乐平
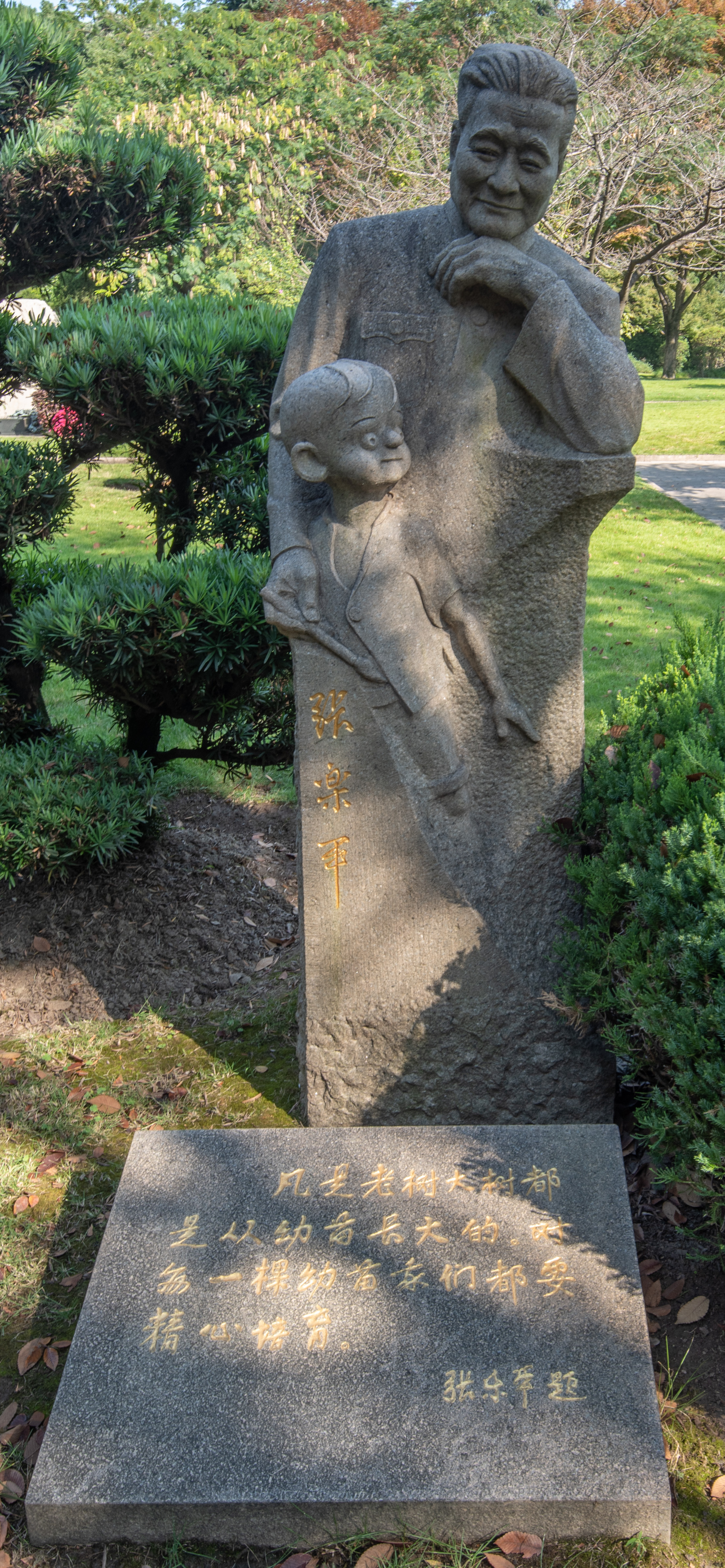
- A statue of Zhang Leping with his character Sanmao at his grave
- Born: November 10, 1910 Jiaxing, Zhejiang Province, Qing China
- Died: September 27, 1992 (aged 81) Shanghai
- Notable works: Sanmao

Vice Chair of the Shanghai Branch of China Artists Association
- In office 1962 – 1992

Zhang Leping (simplified Chinese: 张乐平; traditional Chinese: 張樂平; pinyin: Zhāng Lèpíng; [ʈʂáŋ lɤ̂pʰǐŋ]; November 10, 1910 – September 27, 1992) was a Chinese comic artist born in Jiaxing, Zhejiang province. He played a key role in the development of modern manhua in China, and is mostly remembered for his creation of the manhua Sanmao.

== Early life ==
In 1924, Zhang lived in extreme poverty and was unable to continue his primary school education. In the fall of 1927, his area was attacked by the Northern Expedition army. By 1928, at the age of 18 years, with the support of relatives, he was recommended by the teachers to re-enter school for a period of formal art education.

In a short time, the January 28 incident occurred in 1932 and his artistic skills became the highest demand. China would use comics in anti-Japanese advertising in publications. His comic career would officially begin in 1934. In just one year, he would become part of the anti-Japanese comic propaganda team.

When he initially created Sanmao in 1935 his main goal was to convey the hardship of the Japanese aggression in China through the eyes of the children, especially orphans. He wanted to express his concern for the young victims, particularly the real orphans on the streets. Therefore, Sanmao became the symbol for those children.

== Career ==
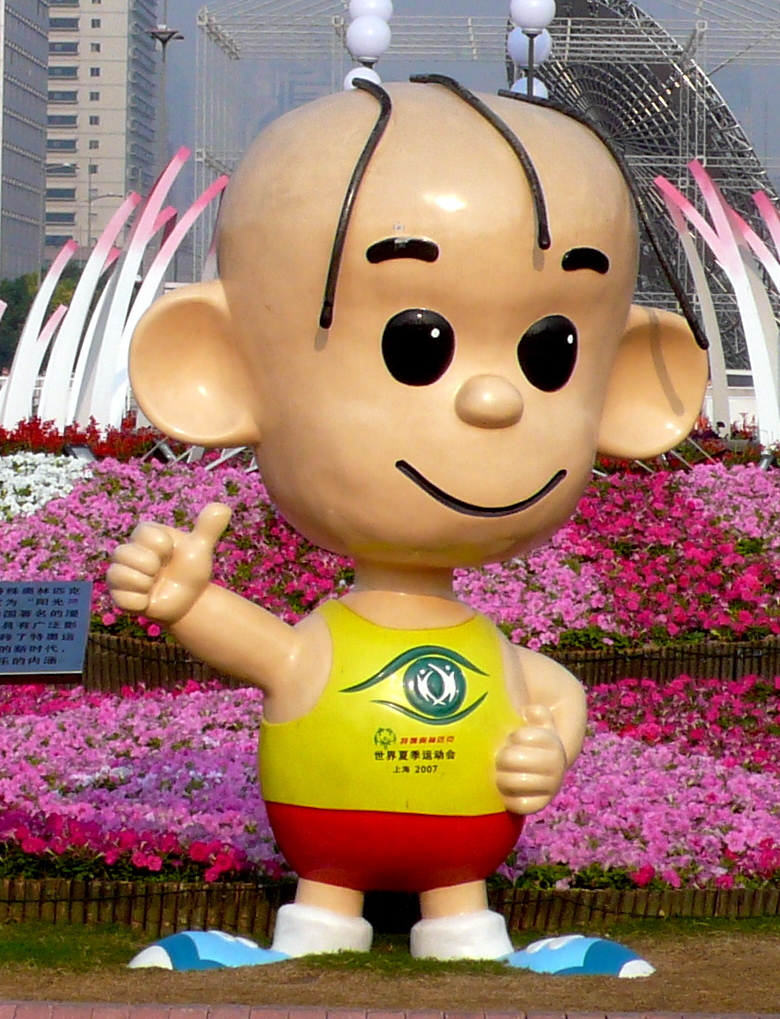
A statue of Zhang Leping's character Sanmao in Pudong

In the 1950s he worked for the Shanghai People's Fine Arts Publishing House, the Shanghai-based Liberation Daily and the Shanghai Youth and Children's Publishing House.

During the Cultural Revolution, Zhang faced persecution, and was consequently forced to stop writing. Following the Cultural Revolution, he transferred from Liberation Daily to the Children's Publishing House. On June 1, 1977, after ten years of absence, Zhang returned to his Sanmao comic.

In 1983, Zhang Leping received the "National Advanced Children and Young Workers" award. In the same year, he contracted severe Parkinson's disease; in spite of the difficulty in drawing he consequently encountered, he continued his cartooning career. In 1985, he received the "Yushu Award" and became the editor-in-chief of Shanghai's Manga World magazine. He produced his final comic strip in 1986, titled People to Old Age (人到老年).

In 1989, Sanmao, a famous Taiwanese female writer, came to Shanghai to find him, and he hailed her as a literary genius. In his later years, Zhang Leping devoted great enthusiasm to the cultural exchanges between the two sides of the Taiwan Straits. In 1991, he won the special prize for his People's Cross-Strait Love essay by the Central People's Broadcasting Station. On April 4, 1991, his last comic book, "Cat Feeding Rats", was published in the Liberation Daily. In the winter of the same year, Zhang decided to donate the manuscript of San Mao to the Shanghai Art Museum.

The Sanmao comics were translated throughout his career and introduced to other countries. The character has also been the main attraction in a number of movies, cartoons and other forms of on stage theatricals.

On September 27, 1992, Zhang Leping died in the Shanghai Huadong Hospital; he was 81 years old.

== After death ==
A public trial was held in 1997 in the First Intermediate People's Court of Shanghai to settle the lawsuit of who owned the rights to the Sanmao character and comics after the death of the author. The judgement was mostly in favor of the author's widow and children.

In 2007, Sanmao was used as the mascot of the Special Olympics in Shanghai in his honor. Additionally, the Zhang Leping Picture Book Award was founded in his honor in 2016. There is a memorial hall dedicated to Zhang in Jiaxing, his birthplace.
