= Wu Yonggang =

Chinese film director

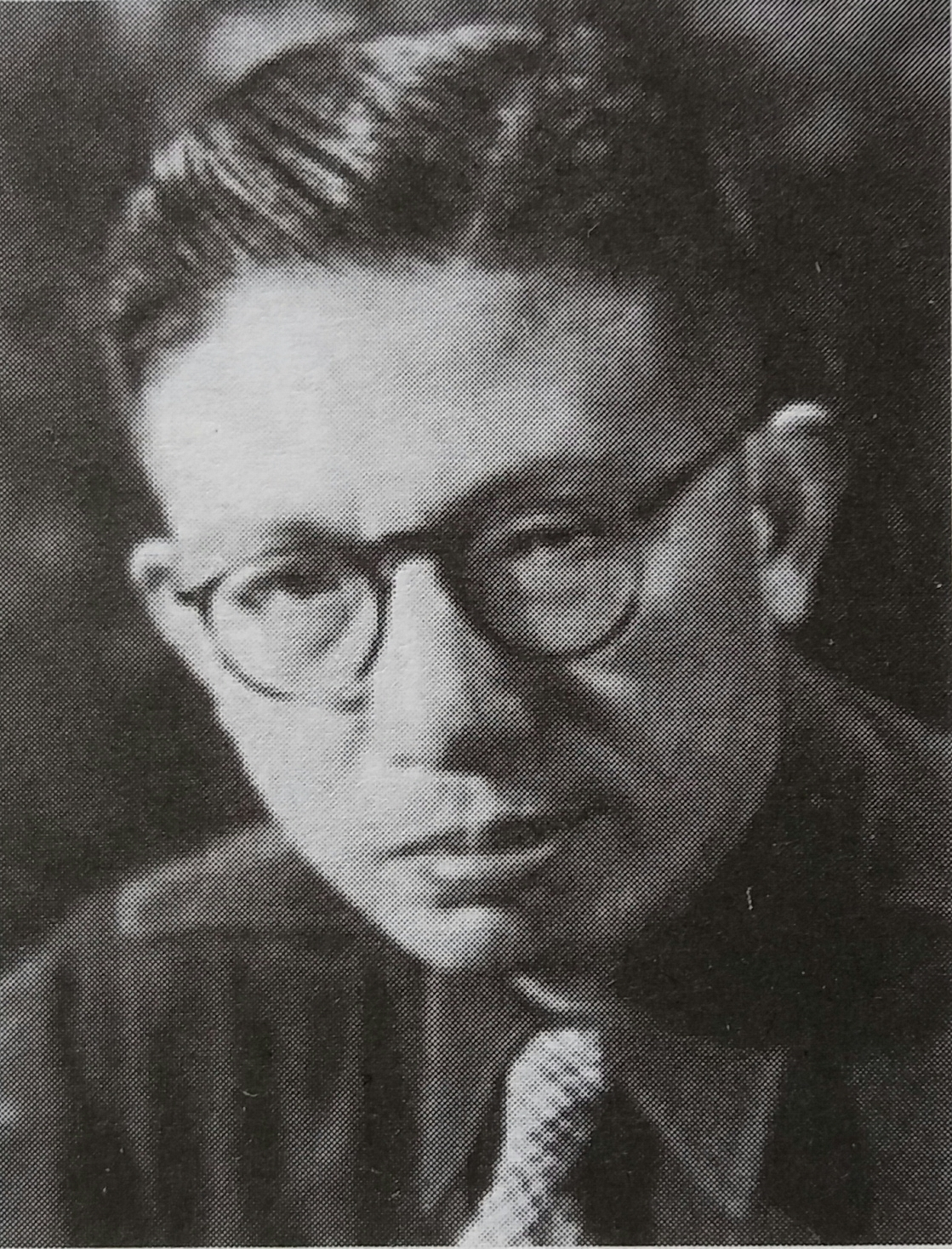
- Born: November 1, 1907; Shanghai, China
- Died: December 18, 1982 (aged 75)
- Occupation: Film director
- Years active: 1930s-1980s
- Awards: Golden Rooster Awards – Best Picture; 1981 Evening Rain

Chinese name
- Traditional Chinese: 吳永剛
- Simplified Chinese: 吴永刚
Transcriptions
Standard Mandarin
- Hanyu Pinyin: Wú Yǒnggāng

Wu Yonggang (November 1, 1907 – December 18, 1982) was a prominent Chinese film director during the 1930s. Today Wu is best known for his directorial debut, The Goddess (1934). Wu had a long career with the Lianhua Film Company in the 1930s, in Chongqing during the war, and in the mainland after the 1949 communist revolution.

== Biography ==
Wu Yonggang was born in Shanghai in 1907, but was considered a native of his ancestral home Wu County, Jiangsu in Chinese convention. Wu Yonggang was one of the major leftist film directors of pre-Communist China. For the early part of his career, Wu was a set designer with Dazhonghua Baihe, before transferring to the Shaw Brothers' Tianyi Film Company. He was eventually noticed by Shi Dongshan at the newly formed Lianhua Film Company. His first film from the director's chair, 1934's The Goddess (under contract with Lianhua), earned both him and the film's star, Ruan Lingyu, rave reviews. A prolific director, Wu continued to make films well into the 1970s until his retirement shortly before his death, including Evening Rain (co-directed with Wu Yigong), which won Best Picture at the first annual Golden Rooster Awards.

Acclaimed director Chen Kaige referred to Wu Yonggang as one of his most admired directors, and named The Goddess as his favorite film of the 1930s.

== Selected filmography ==
Year	English Title	Chinese Title	Notes
1934	The Goddess	神女	
1935	Little Angel	小天使	
1936	The Desert Island	浪淘沙	
1936	The Pioneers	壮志凌云	Also known as Soaring Aspirations
1938	Rouge Tears	胭脂泪	Wu's remake of his own debut The Goddess for the Xinhua Film Company
1946	Loyal Family	忠义之家	
1947	Waiting for Spring	迎春曲	
1947	Decision of a Lifetime	终生大事	
1950	The Far Away Village	遥远的乡村	
1952	Hasen and Jiamila	哈森与加米拉	
1956	Qiu Meets the Goddess of Flowers	秋翁遇仙记	
1958	Lin Chong	林冲	
1980	Evening Rain	巴山夜雨	Co-directed with Wu Yigong
