= Wanderings of Sanmao =

- Countries of origin: China; Thailand
- No. of episodes: 26

Original release
- Network: CCTV; True Spark
- Release: 2006 – present

Wanderings of San Mao (Chinese: 三毛流浪记) is a Chinese animated series in China based on the famous manhua character Sanmao. The series was invested, produced and broadcast by CCTV. It is also known as Story of San Mao's Vagrant Life or New Adventures of San Mao.

A 1-minute English clip of the series can be found in YouTube.

== Background ==
The main character of the animation, Sanmao, has been around since the 1930s among comic books in China. The character recently celebrated its 70th birthday in 2005, and this series is one of the many tributes to the longevity of San Mao. Other productions have taken place in the past including movies, stage plays, soap operas and puppet films. This series is different from the 1984 cartoon of the same name.

== Story ==
San Mao was a very poor orphan. He was wandering in Shanghai where people dreamed of riches in the 1930s. Sanmao, together with his baldheaded friend Xiao Laizi received grain unexpectedly from the entrepreneur Wu Zifu. Later he fell into a coma mysteriously, and the reporter Hou Yiwen would try to investigate the relationship between Wu Zifu and San Mao.
