= Sanmao (writer) =

Taiwanese novelist, translator and writer

Echo Chen Ping
- 陳平
- Born: Chen Mao-ping (陳懋平); March 26, 1943; Chongqing, Sichuan, China
- Died: 4 January 1991 (aged 47); Taipei Veterans General Hospital, Taipei, Taiwan
- Citizenship: Republic of China; Spain
- Education: Taiwan Provincial Taipei First Girls' High School (dropout)
- Alma mater: Chinese Culture University; Complutense University of Madrid
- Occupations: Writer, translator
- Spouse: José María Quero y Ruíz (m. 1973; died 1979)
- Relatives: Chen Siqing (father); Miao Jinlan (mother); Chen Tianxin (sister)
- Writing career
- Pen name: Sanmao (三毛)
- Language: Mandarin Chinese
- Period: 1943–1991
- Notable works: Stories of the Sahara; Gone with the Rainy Season

Sanmao (Chinese: 三毛; pinyin: Sānmáo) was the pen name of Echo Chen Ping (born Chen Mao-ping; 26 March 1943 – 4 January 1991), a Taiwanese writer and translator. Her works range from autobiographical writing, travel writing and reflective novels, to translations of Spanish-language comic strips. She studied philosophy and taught German before becoming a career writer. Her pen name was adopted from the main character of Zhang Leping's most famous work, Sanmao. In English, she was also known as Echo or Echo Chan, the first name she used in Latin script, after the eponymous Greek nymph. Since childhood, she was said to have avoided writing the character "Mao" (懋) as it was too complex; later in life, she legally changed her name to Chen Ping.

== Early life ==
She was born Chen Mao-ping in Chongqing to Chen Siqing, a lawyer, and Miao Jinlan. She had an older sister, Chen Tianxin. Her parents were devout Christians. Her family was from Zhejiang. After the Second Sino-Japanese War, the family moved to Nanjing. When she was six, her family moved to Taiwan due to the victory of the Chinese Communist Party in the Chinese Civil War. She disliked the restrictiveness of the Taiwanese school system.

As a child, she developed an interest in literature and read a range of writers from all countries, including Lu Xun, Ba Jin, Bing Xin, Lao She, and Yu Dafu, and works such as The Count of Monte Cristo, Don Quixote, and Gone with the Wind. She read Dream of the Red Chamber as a Grade 5 student during class. When asked what she wanted to become when she grew up, she said that she wanted to marry a great artist, specifically Pablo Picasso.

Due to her preoccupation with reading, Sanmao's grades suffered in middle school, particularly in mathematics. After an incident when a teacher drew black circles around her eyes and humiliated her in class, Sanmao dropped out. Her father home-schooled her in English and classical literature and hired tutors to teach her piano and painting.

In 1962, at age 19, Sanmao published her first essay.

== Career ==
Sanmao studied philosophy at the Chinese Culture University in Taiwan, with the goal of "[finding] the solution to problems in life." There, she dated a fellow student; however, becoming "disillusioned with romance," she moved to Madrid, Spain at age 20 and began studying at the Complutense University of Madrid. In Madrid, she met Spanish marine engineer José María Quero y Ruíz, whom she would later marry.

Sanmao later moved to Germany, where she intensively studied German, sometimes up to 16 hours per day. Within nine months, she earned a qualification to teach German and began studying ceramics.

At age 26, Sanmao returned to Taiwan. She was engaged to a teacher from Germany, but he died of a heart attack before they could marry. Sanmao returned to Madrid and began teaching English at a primary school, rekindled her relationship with Ruíz, and married him in 1973, in the then-Spanish-controlled Spanish Sahara.

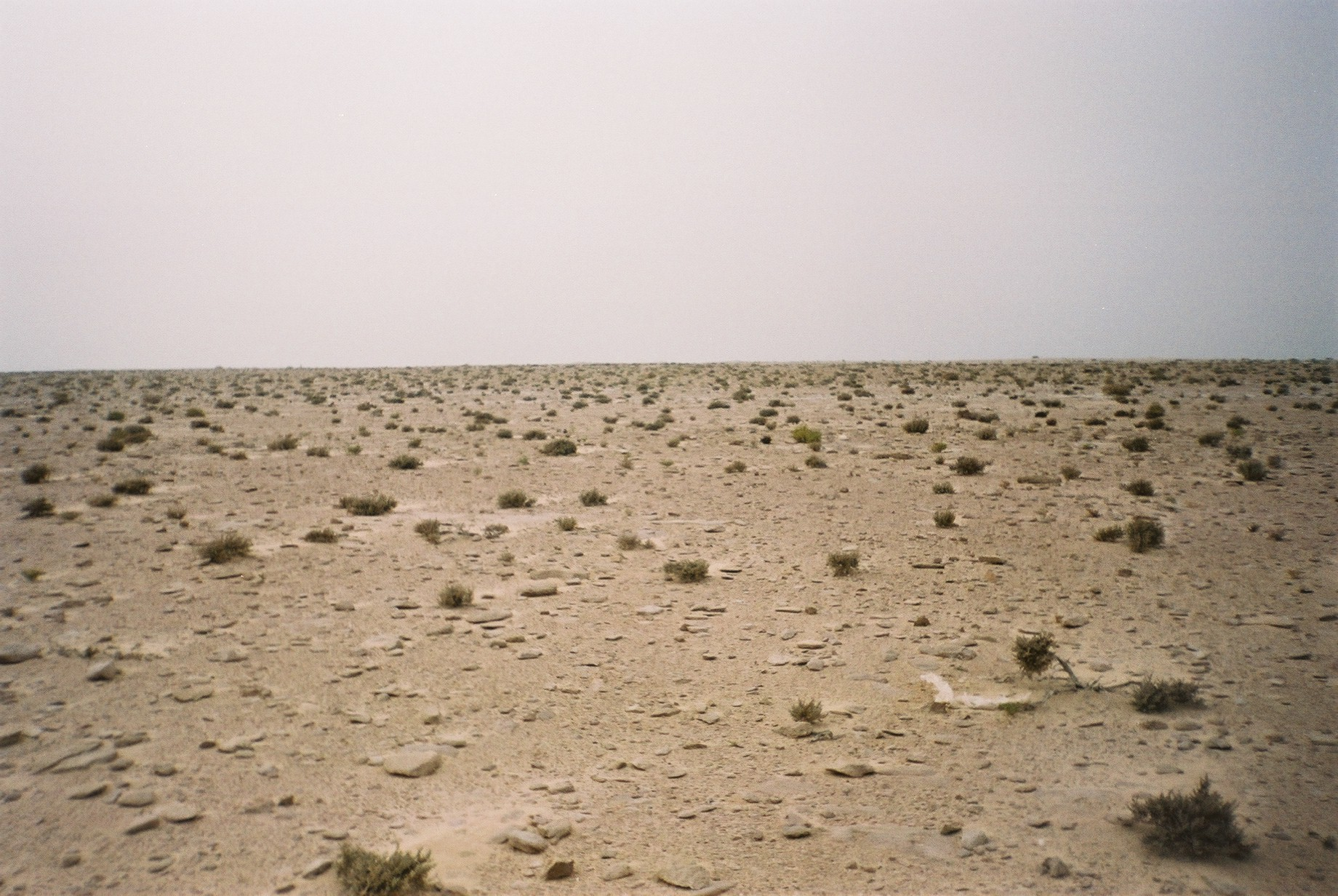
Desert in Sahara

In 1976 she published the autobiographical The Stories of the Sahara, based on her experiences living in the Spanish Sahara with Jose. Part travelogue and part memoir, it established Sanmao as an autobiographical writer with a unique voice and perspective. Following the book's immense success in Taiwan, British Hong Kong, and China, her early writings were collected under the title Gone with the Rainy Season. She continued to write, and her experiences in the Spanish Sahara and the Canary Islands were published in several more books.

On 30 September 1979, Jose drowned in a diving accident. In 1980 she returned to Taiwan, and in November 1981, she traveled to Central and South America on commission from Taiwanese publishers. These experiences were recorded in subsequent works. From 1981 to 1984, she taught and lectured at her alma mater, Chinese Culture University, in Taiwan. After this point, she decided to dedicate herself fully to writing.

Sanmao's books deal mainly with her own experiences studying and living abroad. They were extremely well received not only in Taiwan, but also in Hong Kong and China, and they remain popular. From 1976 to her death in 1991, Sanmao published more than 20 books. She also translated the comic Mafalda from Spanish to Chinese.

== Death ==
On 4 January 1991, at the age of 47, Sanmao committed suicide at Taipei Veterans General Hospital in Taipei by hanging herself with a pair of silk stockings.

Some fans, notably Zhang Jinran, claimed her death was a murder. Her apparent suicide came as a shock to many readers and was accompanied by public expressions of grief throughout the Chinese-speaking world. There has been much speculation regarding the reason for her suicide: a cancer scare, disappointment over losing the Taiwan film Golden Horse Film Festival and Awards for her script to the film Red Dust, a loss which she took poorly, or depression over her husband's death 12 years earlier. She was buried at the Chin Pao San Cemetery.

On 26 March 2019, Google commemorated Sanmao with a Doodle on her 76th birth anniversary.

In 2019, Sanmao was acknowledged in the New York Times Overlooked posthumous obituary feature for her book The Stories of the Sahara. Her work is lauded for its endurance through generations, inspiring young Taiwanese and Chinese women yearning for independence from conservative cultural norms.

English-language editions of The Stories of the Sahara were published posthumously by Bloomsbury Publishing, following an agreement with Crown Culture.

== Filmography ==
=== Film ===
Year	English title	Original title	Non Acting Role	Remark	Ref.
1990	Red Dust	滾滾紅塵	Screenwriter	with Yim Ho	
