= Rolf Hoppe =

German actor (1930–2018)

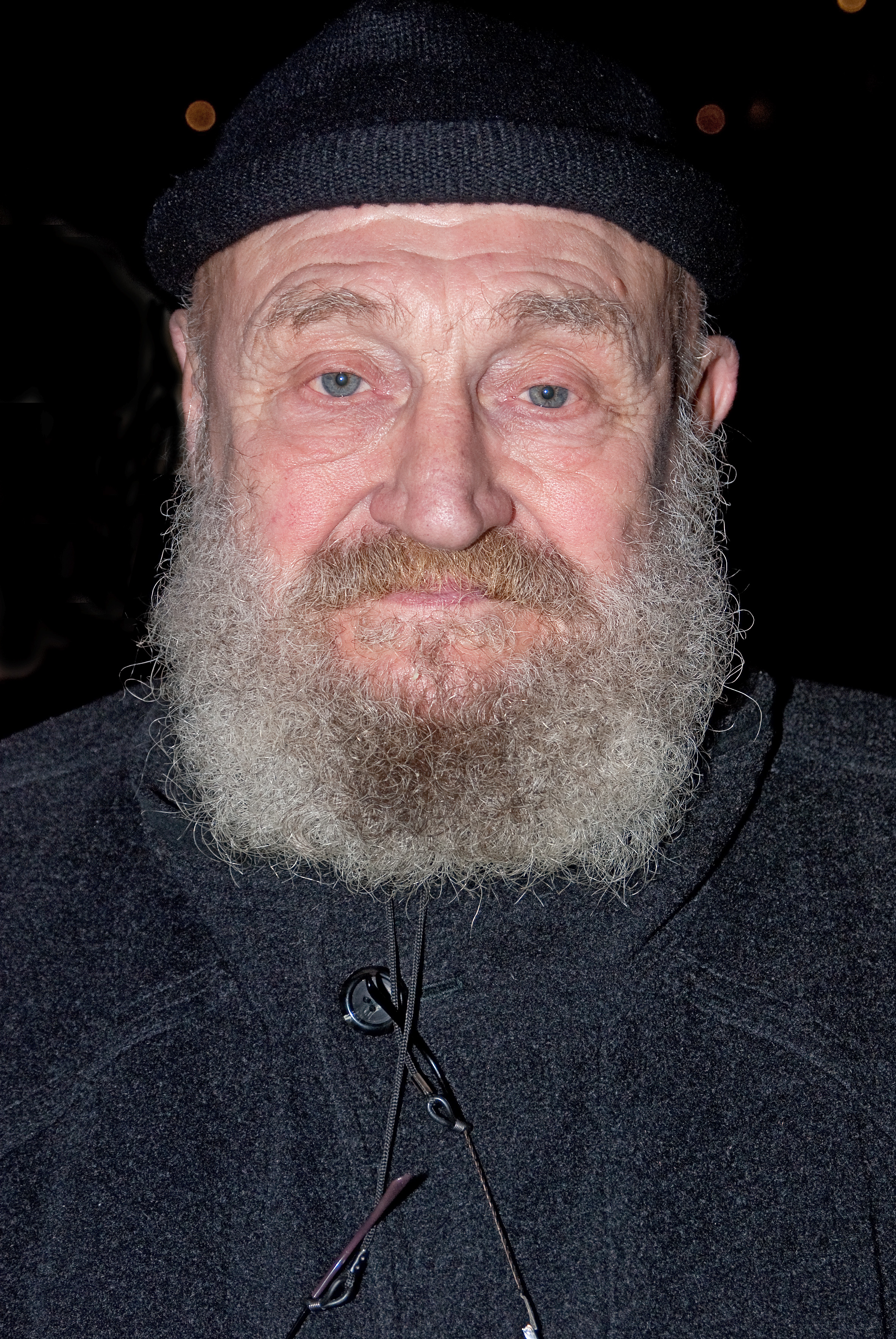
- Rolf Hoppe in 2009 at the 59th Berlin International Film Festival
- Born: 6 December 1930; Ellrich, Saxony, Prussia, German Reich
- Died: 14 November 2018 (aged 87); Dresden, Saxony, Germany
- Education: Staatliches Konservatorium, Erfurt
- Occupation: Actor
- Years active: 1948–2014
- Notable credits: Three Wishes for Cinderella; Mephisto
- Spouse: Friederike (m. 1962)
- Children: 2

Rolf Hoppe (6 December 1930 – 14 November 2018) was a prolific German stage, cinema, and television actor, who played in more than 400 films and theatre productions in a career which spanned over six decades.

To international audiences Hoppe is perhaps best known for his roles as the General in the Oscar-winning Mephisto (1981) and as the King in the East-German–Czechoslovak Holiday classic Three Wishes for Cinderella (1973).

== Early life ==
Hoppe was born the son of a master baker in Ellrich, Thuringia, Germany. After his apprenticeship as a baker, he worked from 1945 to 1948 as a coach driver.

== Career ==
Hoppe moved to Erfurt where he began formal training as an actor at the Staatliches Konservatorium from 1949 to 1951, during which time he supported himself by working as an animal handler at the Zirkus Aeros. He later performed at Thalia Theater in Halle (Saale) and at the Theater der jungen Welt (children's and youth theatre) in Leipzig. His stage performances included such notable venues as the Staatsschauspiel Dresden, the Deutsches Theater in Berlin, and the Salzburg Festival. Internationally, he worked in Switzerland, Italy, Poland and China.

In the East German DEFA movies, Hoppe frequently played villains in different Osterns ("Red Westerns") of the 1960s and 1970s. In the 1973 fairytale film Three Wishes for Cinderella, a Czechoslovak–East German co-production, he appeared as the King. One of Hoppe's most notable roles is that of "the General" (based on Hermann Göring) in István Szabó's drama Mephisto, which was awarded the 1981 Academy Award for Best Foreign Language Film. In Peter Schamoni's historical drama Spring Symphony, he played Friedrich Wieck, the strict piano teacher of Robert Schumann and father of Clara Wieck.

In addition to numerous appearances in feature films and television productions, Hoppe also worked as a voice-artist in children's radio plays and audio-books.

== Private life and death ==
Hoppe died 14 November 2018 in Dresden, where he lived in the suburb of Weißig. He was interred in the Waldfriedhof Weisser Hirsch (cemetery), Dresden. He was survived by his wife Friederike with whom he had two daughters: Josephine and Christine, the latter also an actress. His grandson Oscar Hoppe is an actor as well.

== Selected filmography ==
- 1963: Jetzt und in der Stunde meines Todes, as Portier
- 1965: Solange Leben in mir ist, as Abgeordneter
- 1965: Die besten Jahre, as Lehrer Klein
- 1965: Der Frühling braucht Zeit, as Rudi Wiesen
- 1965: Karla, as Lehrer Eiffler
- 1966: Fräulein Schmetterling, as Himmelblau
- 1967: Frau Venus und ihr Teufel, as Siegfried
- 1968: I Was Nineteen, as Major Behring
- 1968: Die Nacht im Grenzwald, as Bennigsen
- 1968: Spur des Falken, as Bashan
- 1968: Hauptmann Florian von der Mühle, as Polizeidirektor
- 1968: Mohr und die Raben von London, as Bankier
- 1968–1970: Ich – Axel Cäsar Springer (TV series)
- 1969: Lebende Ware, as Grabau
- 1969: Jungfer, Sie gefällt mir, as Reitender Bote
- 1969: Nebelnacht, as Herr Kranepuhl
- 1969: Weiße Wölfe, as James Bashan
- 1970: Tödlicher Irrtum, as Allison
- 1970: Jeder stirbt für sich allein (TV Mini-Series)
- 1971: Männer ohne Bart, as Gangster
- 1971: Goya or the Hard Way to Enlightenment, as Charles IV of Spain
- 1971–1973: Die Brüder Lautensack (TV miniseries)
- 1972: Leichensache Zernik, as Werner W. Bergmann
- 1972: The Stolen Battle, as Josef Barody
- 1972: Eolomea, as Prof. Oli Tal
- 1973: Das zweite Leben des Friedrich Wilhelm Georg Platow, as Dr. Hoppe
- 1973: Apachen, as Captain Burton
- 1973: Susanne und der Zauberring, as Schleusenwärter
- 1973: Die Hosen des Ritters von Bredow, as Ritter Götz von Bredow
- 1973: Three Wishes for Cinderella, as King
- 1973: Die Zwillinge (TV Movie), as Generaldirektor Beißer
- 1974: Orpheus in der Unterwelt, as Jupiter
- 1974: Leben mit Uwe, as Dr. Bohnsack
- 1974: Der nackte Mann auf dem Sportplatz, as Tautz
- 1974: Für die Liebe noch zu mager, as Onkel Carlo
- 1974: Ulzana, as Captain Burton
- 1974: Wie füttert man einen Esel, as Otto-Ernst Schuster
- 1974: Hans Röckle und der Teufel, as Meister Hans Röckle
- 1974: Johannes Kepler, as Emperor Rudolf II
- 1974: Kit & Co, as Shorty
- 1975: Between Day and Night
- 1975: Die Bösewichter müssen dran, as Christian
- 1975: Ikarus, as Brigadier
- 1975–1996: Polizeiruf 110: Die Rechnung geht nicht auf (TV Series), as Goertz / Hopfer / Paul Kramer
- 1976: Daniel Druskat (TV Mini-Series), as Herr Mühlstädt
- 1976: Das Licht auf dem Galgen, as Pfarrer Clark
- 1976: Unser stiller Mann, as Schuster
- 1976: Beethoven – Tage aus einem Leben, as Ignaz Schuppanzigh
- 1977: Zur See (TV Series), as Havarie-Kapitän Topf
- 1977: Unterwegs nach Atlantis, as Alexander Grey
- 1977: Die Flucht, as Der Runde
- 1977–1979: Das unsichtbare Visier (TV Series)
- 1978: Jörg Ratgeb – Maler, as Gaukler
- 1978: Sabine Wulff, as Professor
- 1978: Fleur Lafontaine, as Bullklein
- 1978: Volpone (TV Movie), as Volpone
- 1978: Ein Sonntagskind, das manchmal spinnt, as Lehrer Schütterow
- 1979: Schatzsucher, as Blinder
- 1980: Komödianten-Emil, as Kommissar
- 1980: Yunost Petra
- 1980: Levins Mühle, as Froese
- 1980: Heute abend und morgen früh
- 1981: Mephisto, as Tábornagy
- 1981: Pugowitza, as Hopf
- 1981: Feuerdrachen (TV Series), as Solka
- 1982: Rächer, Retter und Rapiere (TV Series), as Heinrich von Müffling
- 1982: Die Gerechten von Kummerow, as Superintendent
- 1982: Der lange Ritt zur Schule, as Trapper
- 1982: Sonjas Rapport
- 1982: Bahnwärter Thiel (TV Movie), as Pfarrer
- 1983: Spring Symphony, as Friedrich Wieck
- 1983: Mein Vater ist ein Dieb
- 1983: Martin Luther (TV Series)
- 1983–1985: Der Staatsanwalt hat das Wort (TV Series), as Clemens Gerlach / Tristan
- 1984: Woman Doctors, as Dr. Böblinger
- 1984: Who Was Edgar Allan? (TV Movie), as Edgar Allan
- 1985: Irrläufer (TV Movie), as Bergmann
- 1985: Grünstein's Clever Move, as Gefängnisdirektor
- 1985: Hälfte des Lebens
- 1985: Kaiser und eine Nacht, as Eddie
- 1985: Besuch bei Van Gogh, as Amadeus Bergk
- 1985: Die Gänse von Bützow, as Dr. Hane
- 1985: Sachsens Glanz und Preußens Gloria (TV Series), as Augustus III
- 1986: The House on the River, as Director Hüsgen
- 1986: Der Nachbar, as Georg Walz
- 1986: Boundaries of Time: Caspar David Friedrich (TV Movie)
- 1987: Johann Strauss: The King Without a Crown, as Duke Ernest II
- 1987: Liane, as Jürgens Vater
- 1987: Magnat, as Heinberg
- 1987: The Tribulations of a Chinese Gentleman
- 1988: Melanios letzte Liebe (TV Movie), as Melanio Altolaguirre
- 1988: Zimmer 36
- 1989: The Break, as Bruno Markward
- 1989: Pestalozzi's Mountain, as Zehender
- 1989: Bangkok Story, as Hart
- 1989: The Dancing Girl (舞姫), as Robert Koch
- 1989: Ein brauchbarer Mann, as Heiner Rudolf
- 1990: Kohl – ein deutscher Politiker
- 1991: Das Licht der Liebe
- 1991: Ende der Unschuld (TV Movie), as Otto Hahn
- 1991: Bronstein's Children, as Gefangener
- 1992: Die Männer vom K3 (TV Series), as Adolf Buchegger
- 1992: Schtonk!, as Karl Lentz
- 1992: Night on Fire, as Tobler
- 1992: The Democratic Terrorist, as Lodge Hecht
- 1992: Das große Fest (TV Movie), as Friedrich
- 1993: Durchreise – Die Geschichte einer Firma (TV Mini-Series)
- 1993: Die Lok, as Hans Kastler
- 1993–2000: Das Traumschiff (TV Series), as Kommisar Franz Engel / Kurt Steiner
- 1993–1999: Rosamunde Pilcher (TV Series), as Peter Green / Grenville Bayliss
- 1994: Die Elefantenbraut (TV Movie), as Krottendorf
- 1994: Constable Zumbühl, as Gemeindepräsident Mathis
- 1994: Mario and the Magician, as Prefecto Angiolieri
- 1994–2003: Tatort (TV Series), as Dr. Paul Knödgen / Karsunke / Mr. Sudhoff / Walter Severing / Karl Ammond / Tauber
- 1995: La piovra, season 7 (TV Mini-Series), as Professor Ramonte
- 1995: Zu treuen Händen (TV Movie), as Theo Krautinger
- 1995: Matulla und Busch (TV Movie), as Senft
- 1995: Inspector Rex (TV Series), as Erich Staller
- 1997: Geisterstunde – Fahrstuhl ins Jenseits (TV Movie), as Frank
- 1997: Lorenz im Land der Lügner, as König
- 1997: Der Hauptmann von Köpenick (TV Movie), as Zuchthausdirektor
- 1997: Comedian Harmonists, as Gauleiter Streicher
- 1997: Die Healthy, as Georg Mosbacher
- 1997: Reise in die Dunkelheit (TV Movie)
- 1998: Palmetto, as Felix Malroux
- 1998: Sugar for the Beast (TV Movie), as Prof. Weihrauch
- 1998: One Step Too Far (TV Movie), as Anwalt Bornstein
- 1999: Hans im Glück, as Reiter
- 1999: Klemperer – Ein Leben in Deutschland (TV Series), as Opa Findeisen
- 2000: Am Ende siegt die Liebe (TV Movie), as Max Sander
- 2000: Models (TV Movie), as Berhard Rief
- 2001: Die Verbrechen des Professor Capellari (TV Series), as Dr. Walter Schneider
- 2001: Der Bulle von Tölz (TV Series), as Dr. Berthold Schwaninger
- 2001–2006: SOKO Kitzbühel (TV Series), as Manninger / Santigo / Konsul Tichalski
- 2002: Der letzte Zeuge (TV Series), as Josef Karzmann
- 2002: Trenck (TV Movie), as Johann Kirnberger
- 2004: Wilsberg (TV Series), as Erwin Kuhn
- 2004: Donna Leon (TV Series), as Gabriele Cossato
- 2004: Am Kap der Liebe (TV Movie), as Ferdinand Hansen / Paul Freeman
- 2005: Alles auf Zucker!, as Rabbi Ginsberg
- 2007: Giganten (TV Series), as Johann Wolfgang von Goethe
- 2007: SOKO Rhein-Main (TV Series), as Rosenbaum
- 2007: Mein alter Freund Fritz
- 2007–2009: Commissario Laurenti (TV Series), as Galvano
- 2008: The Visit (TV Movie), as Georg Riemann
- 2009: Swinki, as Weber
- 2009: Oh, What a Mess (TV Movie), as Mosche 'Zaide' Pulver
- 2009: Eine Liebe in Petersburg (TV Movie), as Grischa
- 2010: Küstenwache (TV Series), as Gunther Breitscheid
- 2011: Bittere Kirschen
- 2011: Linda geht tanzen (TV Movie), as Wilhelm Hessler
- 2012: Shores of Hope, as Oberst Seler
- 2013: Die letzte Instanz (TV Movie), as Otmar Koplin
- 2014: Ohne Dich, as Hans
- 2016: The Bloom of Yesterday, as Professor Norkus

== Discography ==
- 2010: Hoppe spricht Schöne Frühlingslieder

== Awards ==
- 1971: National Prize of East Germany 1. class for art and literature
- 1981: Critics Award of the Hungarian Journalist. Association for his role in Mephisto
- 1995: Lessing Prize of the Free State of Saxony
- 1998: Grimme-Preis for his role in the TV miniseries Sardsch
- 2005: Goldene Henne for his lifetime achievement
- 2007: Art Award, City of Dresden
- 2010: Officer's Cross of the Order of Merit of the Federal Republic of Germany
