= Sanmao (comics) =

Chinese manhua character

Sanmao 三毛
- Sanmao
- Author: Zhang Leping
- Launch date: 1935
- Genre(s): manhua, pantomime comic, gag-a-day

Sanmao (Chinese: 三毛; pinyin: Sānmáo) is a manhua character created by Zhang Leping in 1935. He is one of the world's longest running cartoon characters and remains a landmark as one of the most famous and beloved fictional characters in China today.

The name Sanmao means "three hairs" in Chinese or "three mao" (a reference to his poverty). While the character has undergone a number of transitions over time, he has always been drawn with the trademark three strands of hair, which implies malnutrition as a result of poverty.

== History ==
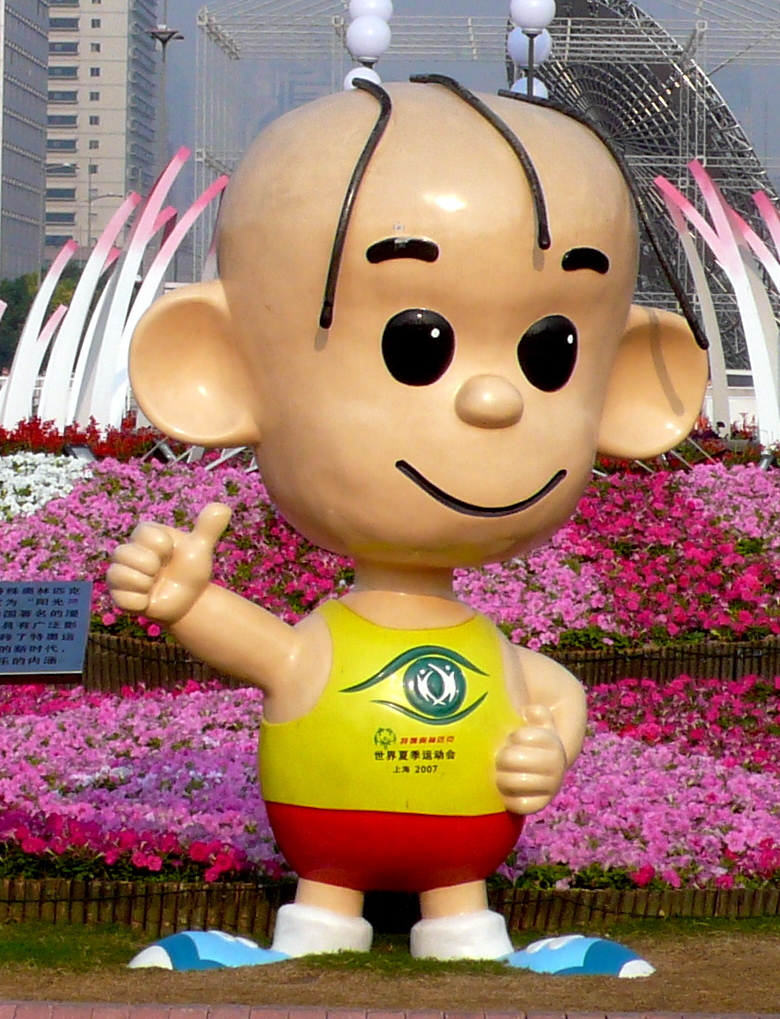
A statue of Sanmao in Shanghai honoring his role as the mascot of the 2007 Special Olympics World Summer Games

Most Chinese comic books prior to Sanmao featured adults and the Sanmao stories were also unusual in that they lacked dialogue and could therefore be classified as pantomime comics. When Zhang Leping created the manhua comic series, his main goal was to dramatize the confusion brought about to society by the Second Sino-Japanese War. He wanted to express his concern for the young victims of the war, particularly the orphans living on the streets. Most of the changes in the characters would come after World War II during the liberation in 1949.

Sanmao's image has evolved throughout time and in some modern continuation of the comics, he is depicted as a healthy, normal student. The character has also been portrayed as living through some of the most important periods in Chinese history and during futuristic space explorations.

Sanmao was chosen as the mascot of the 2007 Special Olympics World Summer Games, which were held in Shanghai.

== Adaptations ==
The character made his first appearance in comics and was later adapted into different formats.

Chinese title	English title	Year	Type	Location	Studio
三毛欢乐派		2006	Online game	China	
三毛流浪记	Wanderings of Sanmao	2006	Cartoon	China; Thailand	Shanghai Animation Film Studio
三毛从军记		2005	Stage production	China	
虚拟导游三毛		2005	3D	China	
三毛救孤记		2004	Film	China	
三毛太空漫游		2000	Theatrical	Hong Kong	
三毛新传		1999	TV series	China	
三毛流浪记	Adventures of Sanmao	1997	Stage production	Hong Kong	
三毛流浪记	Adventures of Sanmao	1996; 1998	TV series	China; Thailand	Shanghai Film Studio
三毛从军记	San Mao Joins the Army	1992	Film	China	
三毛流浪记	Adventures of Sanmao	1990	Drama	China	
三毛流浪记	Adventures of Sanmao	1984	Cartoon	China	
三毛学生意		1958	Film	China	
三毛流浪记	Adventures of Sanmao	1958	Animated film	China	
三毛流浪记	The Adventures of Sanmao the Waif	1949	Live-action film	China	Kunlun Film Company

== Influence and legacy ==
- The renowned Taiwanese writer Chen Mao Ping (1943–91) chose "Sanmao" as her pen name in reference to the character.
- The Hong Kong movie star Sammo Hung Kam-Bo was given the name Sammo because of his supposed resemblance to Sanmao.
