= Flirting with Fate (1916 film) =

1916 film by Christy Cabanne

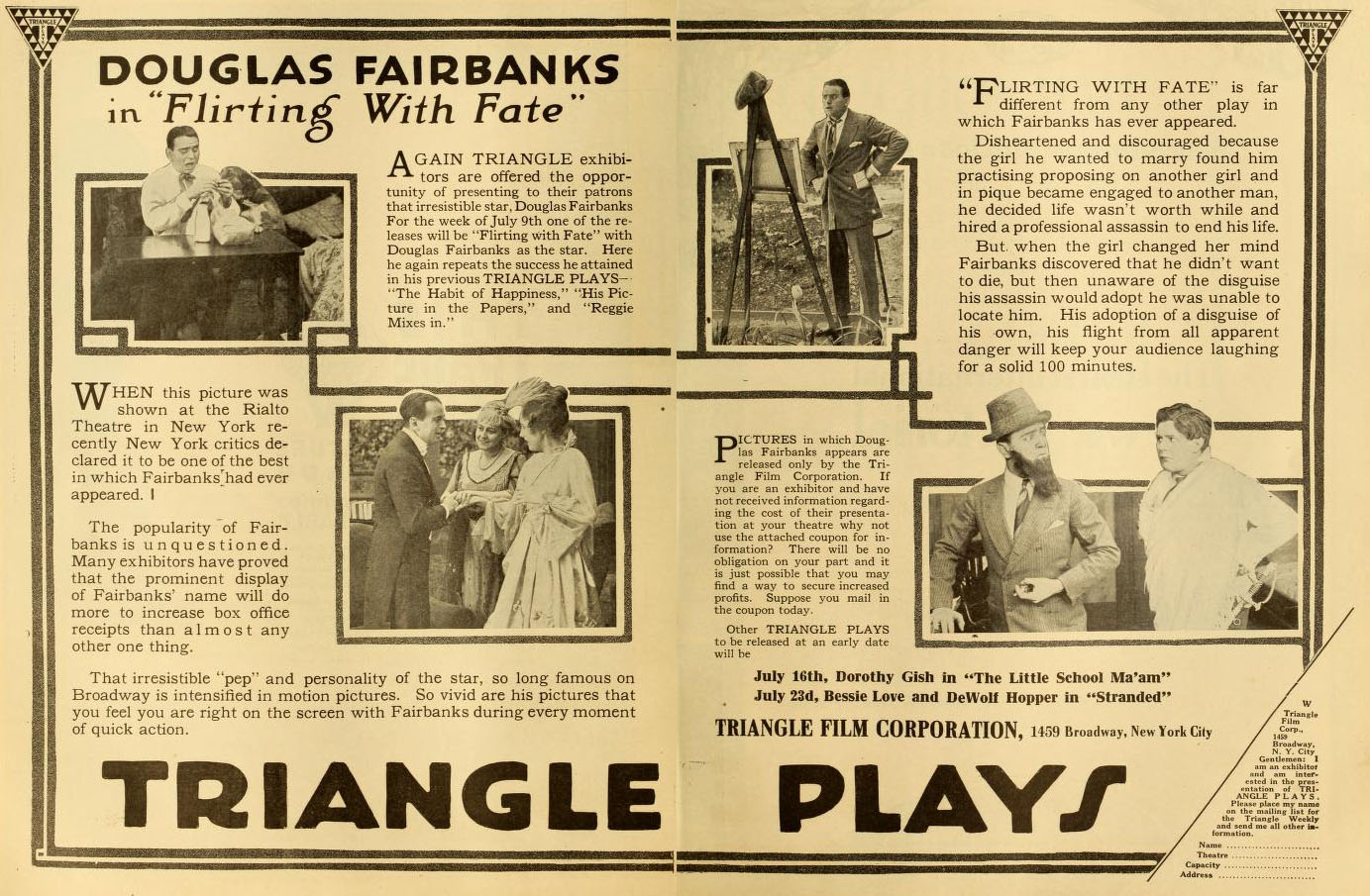
- Directed by: Christy Cabanne
- Written by: Robert M. Baker
- Produced by: Fine Arts Film Company
- Starring: See below
- Cinematography: William Fildew
- Distributed by: Triangle Film Corporation
- Release date: July 9, 1916
- Running time: 57 minutes 50 minutes (USA)
- Country: US
- Language: Silent..(English intertitles)

Flirting with Fate is a 1916 American film directed by Christy Cabanne and starring Douglas Fairbanks. It was produced by the Fine Arts Film Company and distributed by Triangle Film Corporation.

== Synopsis ==
In a desperate, but not-too-courageous, attempt to end his life, a man hires a murderer to do the job for him. Soon, though, things are looking better and he must now avoid the hit.

== Cast ==
- Douglas Fairbanks as Augy Holliday
- W.E. Lawrence as Harry, Augy's Friend
- Jewel Carmen as Gladys, the Girl
- Dorothy Haydel as Phyllis, Her Chum
- George Beranger as Automatic Joe
- J.P. McCarty as The Detective
