= Tulips (film) =

- Film poster
- Directed by: Rex Bromfield; Mark Warren; Al Waxman
- Written by: Gabe Kaplan; Henry Olek; Al Waxman
- Produced by: John B. Bennett; Don Carmody
- Starring: Gabe Kaplan; Bernadette Peters; Henry Gibson; Al Waxman
- Cinematography: François Protat
- Edited by: Alan Collins, Yurij Luhovy
- Music by: Edward Karam
- Distributed by: United States; AVCO Embassy Pictures; Canada; Astral Films
- Release date: October 1981
- Running time: 93 min.
- Countries: Canada; United States
- Language: English

Tulips is a 1981 Canadian-American comedy-drama film starring Gabe Kaplan and Bernadette Peters. The director was officially credited as "Stan Ferris", but the film was actually directed by Rex Bromfield, Mark Warren and Al Waxman.

== Plot ==
Leland Irving (Gabe Kaplan) is depressed and lonely. He survives suicide attempts, and hires a professional hit man, Maurice Avocado (Henry Gibson) to kill him; Avocado will use the code word "Tulips" when the time is at hand. While awaiting his fate, Leland comes across a woman—Rutanya Wallace (Bernadette Peters)—who is attempting suicide, and saves her. Rutanya is suffering from being rejected by a lover, but is charmingly unconventional and outgoing, the opposite of Leland's introvert. Their lives become intertwined, and although wary and battling initially, they fall in love and marry.

However, now that they have found each other, they must call off the hit by Avocado, and complications arise. When Avocado will not agree to calling off the hit, Leland and Rutanya desperately try to obtain guns, etc., to attempt to kill the killer. In the end, no one dies.

In one of the early scenes of their courtship, Leland plays the tuba while Rutanya sings "The Sidewalks of New York".

== Cast ==
- Gabe Kaplan as Leland Irving
- Bernadette Peters as Rutanya Wallace
- Henry Gibson as Maurice Avocado
- Al Waxman as Bert Irving
- Dave Boxer as Dr. Carl Walburn
- Howard Urley as Bouncer
