= Wu Yigong =

Chinese film director and producer (1938–2019)

- Born: 1 December 1938; Hangzhou, Zhejiang, China
- Died: 14 September 2019 (aged 80); Shanghai, China
- Occupations: Film director, film producer
- Years active: 1980–2019
- Political party: Chinese Communist Party
- Awards: Golden Rooster Awards – Best Director; 1983 My Memories of Old Beijing

Chinese name
- Traditional Chinese: 吳貽弓
- Simplified Chinese: 吴贻弓
Transcriptions
Standard Mandarin
- Hanyu Pinyin: Wú Yígōng

Wu Yigong (Chinese: 吴贻弓; 1 December 1938 – 14 September 2019) was a Chinese film director and producer.

== Biography ==
Born in Hangzhou, Zhejiang Province, Wu Yigong enrolled in the directing department of the Beijing Film Academy in 1956. After graduation in 1960, he was appointed as an assistant director at Shanghai Haiyan Film Factory.

His first solo film, My Memories of Old Beijing (城南旧事), won the 3rd Golden Rooster Award for best director. His other films include Evening Rain (巴山夜雨) (1st Golden Rooster Award for best motion picture) (co-directed with Wu Yonggang), The Tribulations of a Young Master (少爷的磨难), and A Confucius Family (阙里人家), among others.

Wu served as president of the Shanghai Film Studio, general manager of the General Shanghai Film Corporation, and president of the Shanghai Film Bureau.

He joined Chinese Communist Party in June 1985, and was an alternate member of 14th and 15th Central Committee of the Chinese Communist Party.

Wu died on 14 September 2019 in Ruijin Hospital, Shanghai. He was 80 years old.

== Filmography (as director) ==
Year	English Title	Chinese Title	Notes
1980	Evening Rain	巴山夜雨	Co-directed with Wu Yonggang
1980	Our Little Cat	我们的小花猫	Short film (35 mins) co-directed with Zhang Yuqiang
1983	My Memories of Old Beijing	城南旧事	
1984	Sister	姐姐	
1985	University in Exile	流亡大学	
1987	The Tribulations of a Young Master	少爷的磨难	Co-produced with West Germany and also known as Ein Chinese sucht seinen Mörder
1988	18 Years Old Man	十八岁男子汉	Two-part TV film.
1990	Return with the Moon	月随人归	
1992	A Confucius Family	阙里人家	
1997	The Soul of the Sea	海之魂	
1998	Anna Chennault	陈香梅	18-episode TV series about Anna Chennault
2002		风帆	8-episode TV series.
2018	Goddesses in the Flames of War	那些女人	Co-directed with Jiang Ping and Li Zuonan
