= Shanghai Film Studio =

Chinese film studio

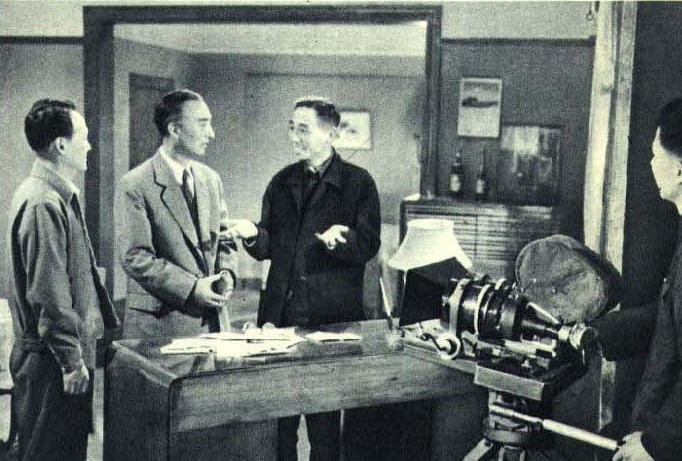
In 1962, the Shanghai Tianma Film Studio producing The Magician's Adventure.

Shanghai Film Studio (simplified Chinese: 上海电影制片厂; traditional Chinese: 上海電影製片廠), one of the three biggest film studios in China, is the film division of the Shanghai Film Group Corporation in Shanghai, China. It is responsible for the production of Chinese films and TV programs.

== History ==
Shanghai is the birthplace of Chinese cinema. As the first open trading port as well as the most prosperous city before the 20th century, Shanghai possessed sufficient resources for the development of Chinese movies. At that time, many of the earliest and most influential film workshops were situated there. Before 1949, most Chinese films were produced in Shanghai, which equipped Shanghai with abundant experience, talents and physical solutions in film production. All these served as the basis for the establishment of the Shanghai Film Studio.

The Shanghai Film Studio was founded on November 16, 1949, the first director being Linren Yu. In 1953, it merged with some private film studios and was reformed into the Shanghai Joint Film Studio, during which time the Joint Studio produced a series of exceptional films featuring the unique characteristic of that era. In the short period from 1949 to 1959, Shanghai Film Studio prospered and emerged as the largest film studio in mainland China, exerting a profound influence on the Chinese cinema. At that time, film talents from all over China flooded into the city and many distinguished films were made. What is more, the Shanghai Film Joint Studio under Linren Yu went on to establish licence trading with foreign film production studios, among them such large multinationals as Universal Pictures, Paramount Pictures, Warner Bros., Walt Disney Pictures, Columbia Pictures, RKO Radio Pictures (from 1949 to 1959, when it became bankrupted), United Artists, Metro-Goldwyn-Mayer, 20th Century Fox and others. Following the reform and opening up in 1978, the Shanghai Film Studio eventually lost its monopoly to the Chinese commercial film studios in mainland China.

In 1996, the Shanghai Film and TV Group was founded, consisting of "Shanghai Studio", "Shanghai Film Lab", "Shanghai Film Development Company" and "Holiday Inn Crown Plaza Shanghai". In 1999, under the direction of General Manager Zhu Yongde, a new 62 acre modern-equipped facility outside Shanghai for tourists and film production was opened.

== Present ==
It is currently known as one of the three largest film studios in China. Since then, the studio has been a key component in revitalizing the nation's animation industry. In 2001 it became part of the Shanghai Film Group Corporation.

== See also ==
- History of Chinese animation
- Chinese animation
