= Nancy Valentine =

American actress (1928–2017)

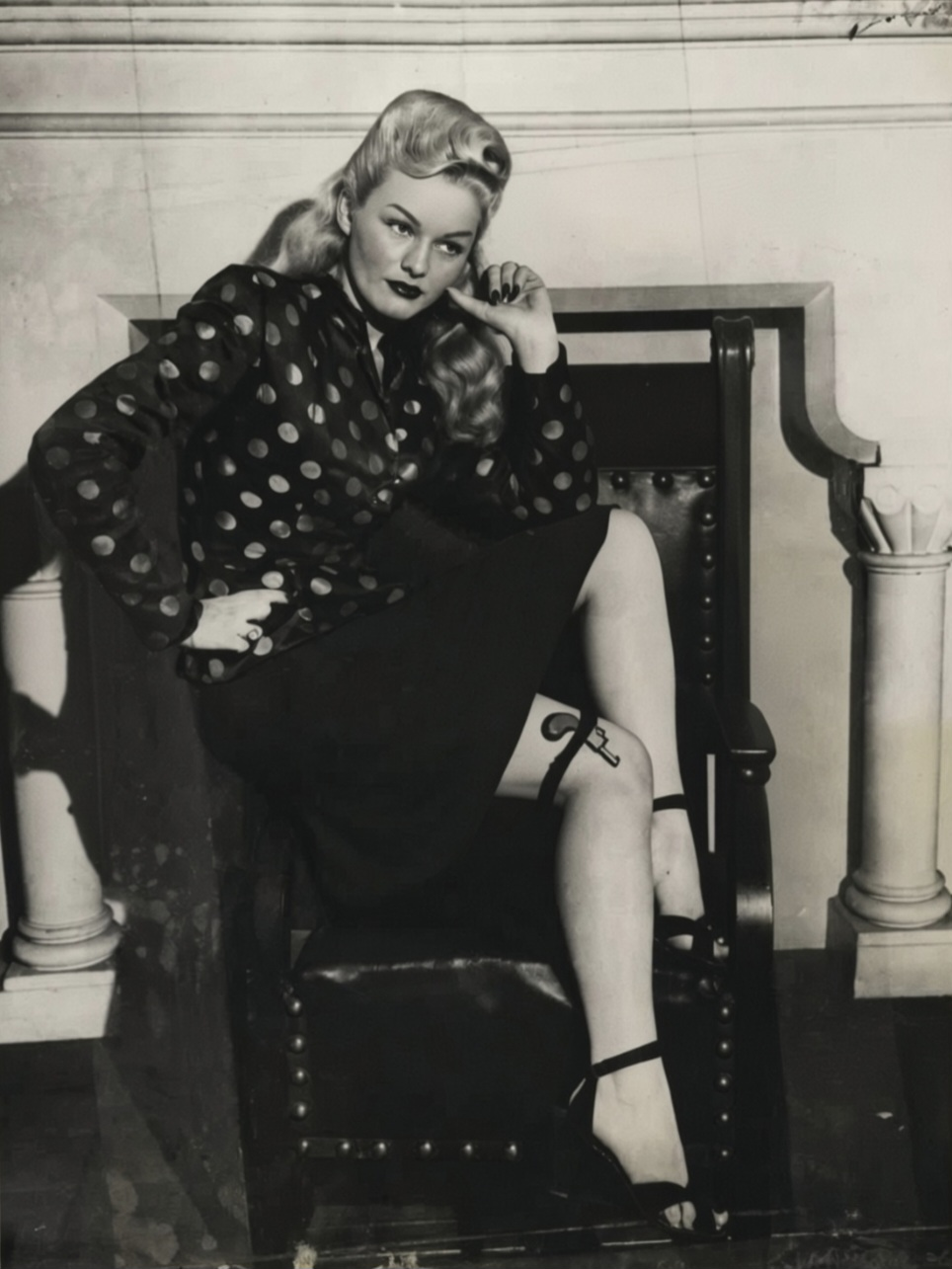
- Valentine in 1945
- Born: Annette Valentine; January 21, 1928; Queens, New York City, U.S.
- Died: July 31, 2017 (aged 89); Malibu, California, U.S.
- Occupations: Model, actress
- Years active: 1945–1973
- Spouses: Jagaddipendra Narayan (m. 1949; ann. 1952); Frederick Tillinghast III (m. 1956; div. 1958); Everett Chambers (m. 1961; div. 1975)
- Children: 3

Nancy Valentine (born Annette Valentine; January 21, 1928 – July 31, 2017) was an American model and actress, better known for her marriage to the Indian Maharaja Jagaddipendra Narayan than for her modeling or early film roles. She later had more success in American television, performing in over thirty different series.

== Biography ==
=== Early years ===
According to her obituary, Valentine was born in St. Albans, Queens, New York City. She was the middle child of five for Richard and Bertha Valentine. Her father had his own sign painting business in Queens.

Her mother said in 1952 that she was born at Smithtown, New York and attended school in East Rockaway, New York. Valentine herself told columnist Earl Wilson she was from Smithtown and had been raised as a Baptist. Her mother said she was never interested in school; instead she had brief jobs working as a store stock clerk and as a nightclub cigarette and camera girl, before becoming a model.

=== Modeling ===
Valentine started as a Conover model but didn't get many assignments until she switched to the Powers agency. Powers corrected her attempt to look glamorous in favor of a natural appearance. She first came to public notice in June 1945 at age 17, in newspaper photos distributed through International News Service. Her modeling career reached its height with the cover of Parade in February 1946. She was reportedly earning $750 a week modeling in New York.

Valentine had just turned eighteen when a candid photo appeared in newspapers, showing her in a New York nightclub with Orson Welles, who was then married to Rita Hayworth. Earl Wilson reported that Welles took Valentine to "Toots Shor's, the Stork Club and even to his radio program", while Dorothy Kilgallen had her going back and forth between Welles and Macoco at El Morocco. Howard Hughes dated her, and later paid for Valentine to travel to Hollywood for a movie tryout.

After arriving in Hollywood with her older sister Betty, Valentine never heard from Hughes again. Valentine was signed to a personal contract by Mervyn LeRoy in May 1946. He advised her to turn down a contract offer from Lou Schrieber at 20th Century Fox, a decision she soon regretted. Instead, LeRoy sold her contract to David O. Selznick at Vanguard Films.

=== Early film career ===
At Vanguard Films she started at $150 a week while taking acting classes. She continued doing highly-paid modeling jobs, but the money now went to the studio, not her. She received a new contract from Vanguard Films in July 1947, but Erskine Johnson reported in April 1948 that "She just checked out of an acting contract at Selznick's". Despite two years at Vanguard she had yet to appear in a film. Within a month of leaving, she landed a bit part in Warner's The Girl from Jones Beach. Her next part came in October 1948 with a Columbia film, The Crime Doctor's Diary. She then appeared in a succession of uncredited bit parts for various studios, culminating in three MGM films: Father of the Bride, Father's Little Dividend, and Million Dollar Mermaid. Her first screen credit came in 1952 with Universal's The Black Castle. This was followed by Small Town Girl, her last film for six years.

=== Maharaja romance ===
From late September 1947, she was linked in newspapers with Jagaddipendra Narayan, Maharaja of Cooch-Behar, in India. Narayan's mother, the Dowager Maharanee, suggested he should come home to India as the political situation was volatile, while a public relations representative tried to convince newspaper readers that Narayan's mission in America was industrial research. A photo of Narayan and Valentine at the El Morocco nightclub in New York made the papers shortly before he had to leave the states.

Five months later Valentine announced her engagement to Howard Darrin Jr, but broke it off within a few weeks. She next announced her engagement to Omar Dejany, an Arab diplomat and businessman, to which Mrs. Lilli Dejany objected while her husband declined comment.

Sheilah Graham reported in early January 1949 on Valentine's forthcoming trip to India to see Narayan. By April 1949, Valentine was back in New York City, making the rounds of night spots. She again visited Narayan, arriving in India on November 16, 1951, after telling columnists they had been secretly married in Cooch Behar in 1949 "by two traveling priests". Arriving in Britain from India on January 1, 1952, she was pictured in the London papers, which described her as wearing a platinum and diamond wedding ring.

Though the government of India didn't approve of the marriage, Valentine was convinced she was married. However, while Valentine was sailing to New York, American newspapers reported the Indian government was now refusing to recognize the marriage. The Star Tribune reported in March 1952 that "sources in India" said the ceremony she underwent in 1949 was a "betrothal ritual" not a wedding, and that Valentine herself was now uncertain as to her marital status. The widespread coverage of her situation in newspapers continued throughout the year. She received her first featured film role and screen credit with the November release of The Black Castle, while columnist Mike Connolly reported she had signed an endorsement deal with the Puritan Dress Company in December. The latter led to a lawsuit in April 1953 as Valentine claimed she wasn't receiving the money promised by Puritan for their "Nancy Valentine Original" line.

=== Hiatus ===
Valentine announced during May 1953 she was leaving acting to enter the Self-Realization Fellowship convent in Los Angeles, following what she later described as a "nervous breakdown". While in the convent she gave an extensive interview to Los Angeles Mirror that ran in four installments from June 30, 1953, through July 3, 1953. She recounted details of her modeling, encounters with celebrities and the film industry, and her trips to India. In the last installment, she revealed the public hounding by columnists and photographers over her romance with Naranyan, and that she had become pregnant by him, but had lost the baby.

Valentine remained at Self-Realization Fellowship for several years as a novitiate. She left before taking final vows, but credited meditation with restoring her mental equilibrium.

Valentine married Frederick Tillinghast III, an oilman from Beverly Hills, during July 1956, after obtaining an annulment of her marriage to Naranyan. They had a daughter who was six months old when Valentine filed for divorce on November 5, 1957, charging mental cruelty. She asked only for $100 monthly child support and $1 token alimony, which was granted on January 29, 1958, in Santa Monica Superior Court. Following her divorce Valentine began working on a memoir, originally titled Broken Valentine, later Fame, Fortune and Folly. Several years later she threatened to sue Tillinghast over $3000 in unpaid child support.

=== Television and later films ===
Valentine's first television work came in 1952 with an episode of Racket Squad, followed by Mr. & Mrs. North the following year. Her performing work ceased while in the convent, but resumed in 1956 with a supporting role in the anthology series Fireside Theatre. Following her divorce, her television work picked up with episodes of Love That Jill and Matinee Theatre and as the first guest on George Fisher's local talk show. She then took over as occasional co-host for Tom Duggan's nightly live talk show on KCOP-TV starting in April 1958.

After doing two episodes of Dragnet, producer Jack Webb gave Valentine her largest film role with -30-. One columnist expressed surprise at her performance, while critic Philip K. Scheuer thought her not convincing as either society girl or would-be reporter. She had a much better received role in Tess of the Storm Country the following year, and played uncredited bits in Portrait of a Mobster and Too Late Blues during 1961.

From 1959 through 1961 Valentine was active on television, playing guest star and supporting roles on episodes of series such as Tales of Wells Fargo, The Texan, Man with a Camera, 77 Sunset Strip, Lawman, The Real McCoys, Hawaiian Eye, Thriller, and Surfside 6.

=== Later life ===
Valentine married actor-director Everett Chambers in October 1961, at the Self-Realization Fellowship Center in Santa Barbara, California. Columnist Sidney Skolsky said the couple met on the set of Too Late Blues. They had a daughter before divorcing in 1975. Valentine died at her home in Malibu, California on July 31, 2017.

== Filmography ==
Film (by year of first release)
Year	Title	Role	Notes & Cites
1949	The Crime Doctor's Diary	Operator	Uncredited. This was Valentine's second film, but the first released.
1949	Make Believe Ballroom	Car Hop	Uncredited.
1949	The Girl from Jones Beach	Margot	Uncredited. Valentine's first film role was as one of a dozen women (Note: Besides Valentine, this group included Lola Albright, Joy Lansing, Joan Vohs, Myrna Dell, and Carol Brewster, all unknown at the time.) serving as inspiration for Ronald Reagan's character.
1949	Strange Bargain	Lucille Gosler	Uncredited.
1949	A Dangerous Profession	Dawson's Secretary	Uncredited.
1950	Whirlpool	Taffy Lou	Uncredited.
1950	Father of the Bride	Fliss	Uncredited.
1951	Father's Little Dividend	Baby Shower Guest	Uncredited, and described as "an extra role".
1952	The Black Castle	Therese Van Wilk	Her first credited role.
1952	Million Dollar Mermaid	Harper's Secretary	Uncredited.
1953	Small Town Girl	Mary	
1959	-30-	Jan Price	Valentine plays society woman determined to break into journalism.
1960	Tess of the Storm Country	Teola Graves	She plays a Mennonite woman, sister to Peter Graves (Jack Ging).
1961	Portrait of a Mobster	Alice Diamond	Uncredited. She played wife to Legs Diamond (Ray Danton).
1961	Too Late Blues	Jazzy Guest	Uncredited.
1971	Private Duty Nurses	Waitress	

== Television ==
Television performances in original broadcast order
Year	Series	Episode	Role	Notes & Cites
1952	Racket Squad	Anyone Can Be a Sucker	Vivian	
1953	Mr. & Mrs. North	Trained for Murder	Edna Diaz	
1956	Fireside Theatre	An Echo Out of the Past	Marjorie Ewing	Valentine plays an English war bride whose injured husband is missing.
1957	Official Detective	Muggers	Miss Grant	
1958	Love That Jill	The Mating Machine		Her appearance on this series is known only from a newspaper article.
1958	Matinee Theater	Wednesday's Child		Valentine had supporting role in story of divorcing couple.
1958	George Fisher Show	(1958-03-17)	Herself	Premiere of George Fisher's daily show on KHJ-TV.
1958	Tom Duggan Show	Unknown episodes	Herself	Valentine was an occasional co-host for this live talk show.
1958	You Bet Your Life	(1958-11-27)	Herself	
1958	Steve Canyon	Operation Towline	Nurse Cluney	Uncredited
1959	Ad Lib (Note: Hour-long local late night talk show on KTLA-TV had no host, just guests who were expected to entertain with spontaneous conversation.)	(1959-01-28)	Herself	Valentine guested with Mischa Auer, George O'Hanlon and Alfred Gottschalk.
1959	Mike Hammer	Baubles, Bangles and Blood	Linda	
1959	The D.A.'s Man	Find Ezra Kane	Spangles	
1959	Tales of Wells Fargo	Kid Curry	Jeannie Nolan	Saloon girl role for Valentine.
1959	M Squad	The Outsider	Connie Lyman	She plays a nightclub hostess misled by a murderous boyfriend.
1959	The Texan	The Gunfighter	Helen	
1959	Dragnet	The Big Operator		She plays a blind actress in a studio murder.
1959	Dragnet	The Big Counterfeit	Elsie Macken	
1959	Have Gun – Will Travel	The Golden Toad	Beverly	
1959	Richard Diamond, Private Detective	The Adjuster	Nancy Porter	Valentine's character winds up dead in insurance scam.
1960	Man with a Camera	Touch-off	Hazel Britt	
1960	Johnny Staccato	The Only Witness	Millie Kloch / Sugar Cane	Valentine does a funny turn as a shy stripper with a Jersey City accent.
1960	77 Sunset Strip	The Starlet	Rhonda Saxon	She plays an actress who won a minor award.
1960	U.S. Marshal	Kill or Be Killed	Vera Andrews	
1960	Bourbon Street Beat	Neon Nightmare	Ruby	
1960	The Deputy	The Lucifer Urge	Alva Wagner	
1960	The Dennis O'Keefe Show	Marriage, Anyone?	Kristine Walsh	
1960	Lawman	The Parting	Jennie Jennings	
1960	Bachelor Father	Bentley's Birthday Gift	Ruth Martin	
1960	New Comedy Showcase	You're Only Young Twice		Grandparents George Murphy and Martha Scott decide to explore life.
1960	The Real McCoys	That Was No Lady	Miss Simpson	
1960	Richard Diamond, Private Detective	Accent on Murder	Lilia Bradley	Her character is killed after hiring Diamond (David Janssen) to protect a poodle.
1960	Zane Grey Theatre	A Gun for Willie	Lilly	
1961	Hawaiian Eye	The Humuhumu* Kid (Note: The full title was The Humuhumunukunukuapuaa Kid, which the episode explained meant an angler who keeps even the littlest of fishes he catches.)	Pat	Valentine plays a bartender who alibis a killer.
1961	Thriller	Yours Truly, Jack the Ripper	Arlene	
1961	Whispering Smith (Note: This series was filmed in 1959-1960 but wasn't aired until 1961.)	Stain of Justice	Stella Dean	She has a brief scene as a jilted mistress who refuses to be bought off.
1961	Sea Hunt	Hit and Run	Virgie Bryant	
1961	Target: The Corruptors!	Bite of a Tiger		
1962	Surfside 6	Find Leroy Burdette	Wilma Argus	Her final series role was as a gangster's woman.
1970	Night Slaves	(TV Movie)	May	
1973	The Girl Most Likely to...	(TV Movie)	2nd Nurse	
