= The Corpse Came C.O.D. =

1947 film by Henry Levin

- "The Corpse Came C.O.D." poster
- Directed by: Henry Levin
- Written by: Dwight V. Babcock; George Bricker
- Screenplay by: Dorothy B. Hughes; Jack Henley
- Based on: The Corpse Came C.O.D. 1944 novel by Jimmy Starr
- Produced by: Samuel Bischoff
- Starring: George Brent; Joan Blondell; Adele Jergens
- Cinematography: Lucien N. Andriot
- Edited by: Jerome Thoms
- Music by: George Duning
- Production company: Columbia Pictures
- Distributed by: Columbia Pictures
- Release date: June 2, 1947
- Running time: 87 minutes
- Country: United States
- Language: English

The Corpse Came C.O.D. is a 1947 American comedy mystery film directed by Henry Levin, produced by Samuel Bischoff and starring George Brent, Joan Blondell and Adele Jergens. The comedic mystery is notable for featuring cameos by Hollywood gossip columnists appearing as themselves: Harrison Carroll, Jimmy Fidler, George Fisher, Hedda Hopper, Erskine Johnson, Louella Parsons, and Sidney Skolsky. The movie is based on a novel by columnist Jimmy Starr, who also appears in the movie. The title makes reference to the practice of cash on delivery. It was produced and distributed by Columbia Pictures.

== Plot ==
Two reporters who are in love (Brent and Blondell) compete with each other when covering the story about the discovery of a corpse found at the mansion of a famous Hollywood movie actress, Mona Harrison. Mona asks Joe Medford, an old friend, to help.

== Cast ==
- George Brent as Joe Medford
- Joan Blondell as Rosemary Durant
- Adele Jergens as Mona Harrison
- Jim Bannon as Det. Lt. Mark Wilson
- Leslie Brooks as Peggy Holmes
- John Berkes as Larry Massey, Photographer
- Fred F. Sears as Det. Dave Short
- William Trenk as Fields
- Grant Mitchell as Mitchell Edwards
- Una O'Connor as Nora
- Marvin Miller as Rudy Frasso
- Mary Field as Felice
- Cliff Clark as Emmett Willard
- Wilton Graff as Maxwell Kenyon
- William Forrest as Lance Fowler
- Cosmo Sardo as Hector Rose
- Charles Wagenheim as Claude
- Lane Chandler as Prison Guard
- Gregory Gaye as Movie Studio Director
- Pat O'Malley as Truck Driver
- George Fisher as Himself
- Harrison Carroll as Himself
- Jimmy Fidler as Himself
- Hedda Hopper as Herself
- Erskine Johnson as Himself
- Louella Parsons as Herself
- Sidney Skolsky as Himself
- Jimmy Starr as Himself

== Production ==
The film was based on a 1944 novel by Hollywood columnist Jimmy Starr. It was his first novel. The Los Angeles Times called it "a swiftmoving tale of murder."

In July 1946 it was announced that producer Sam Bischoff would make the film for Columbia and that George Brent would star. In November it was announced Henry Levin would direct.

Filming look place in late 1946.

== Reception ==
Variety wrote "Henry Levin's direction points up fast pace and light touch to balance melodramatics. Audience interest is sustained... Dialog is light and niftily handled by the cast."

Filmink called it "gloriously fun."
