= Tess of the Storm Country =

Tess of the Storm Country may refer to:

- Tess of the Storm Country (novel), 1909 American romance by Grace Miller White
- Tess of the Storm Country (1914 film), starring Mary Pickford and directed by Edwin S. Porter
- Tess of the Storm Country (1922 film), starring Mary Pickford and directed by John S. Robertson
- Tess of the Storm Country (1932 film), starring Janet Gaynor and directed by Alfred Santell
- Tess of the Storm Country (1960 film), starring Diane Baker and directed by Paul Guilfoyle
