= Harrison Carroll =

American journalist

Harrison Carroll (June 23, 1901 – August 2, 1972) was a Hollywood gossip columnist who worked at the Los Angeles Herald-Express, and whom John Wayne credited with being not only a mentor to him but helping him come up with a moniker to replace his birth name Marion Morrison. He was born in Waco, Texas at the turn of the twentieth century. After graduating from Waco High School, Carroll attended the Rice Institute before moving on to Columbia University, where he took his Bachelor of Arts degree in 1922. That same year, he moved to Los Angeles, California and began working as a reporter for the Los Angeles Times for $25 a week.

In 1925, he was hired as the drama editor of the Los Angeles Evening Herald (an afternoon newspaper that was a precursor to the Herald-Examiner and the merged Herald-Express that continued to employ him until he retired). The following year, he created his gossip column. He eventually had a feature called "Today's Puzzle" that gave clues to a star, never mentioning them by name. He tried not to hurt any of the stars he covered, which made him popular with the denizens of Hollywood.

He covered the film industry for 43 years, writing his last column in 1969, after which he retired. His column was syndicated by the Central Press Association to 48 newspapers. He had feuds with the leading gossip columnists of the day, including Hedda Hopper, Louella Parsons and his fellow Herald columnist Jimmy Starr; all of them appeared as themselves in the 1947 crime movie The Corpse Came C.O.D..

Beginning in 1967 until he retired, Carroll's main place of business was the private, members-only Beverly Hills discotheque-cum-restaurant Daisy, a hang-out for the younger, hipper stars like Paul Newman when he was in L.A. He created the Harrison Carroll Cinema Reporting Prize in 1971, the year before he died. John Wayne was the chairman of the foundation that awarded the prize. In addition to Wayne, Carroll was close to Clara Bow and Clark Gable. Reportedly, 1,000 subscribers cancelled their subscriptions to the Herald after he retired.

He was married twice, to Corrinne Carroll, by whom he had a son and whom he divorced, and to Maria Carroll, whom he lived with for 47 years.

Army Archerd, who would establish himself as a famous entertainment industry gossip columnist, worked as a "leg man" for Carroll.
