= Margaret Herrick =

American librarian (1902–1976)

- Born: Margaret Florence Buck; September 27, 1902; Spokane, Washington, U.S.
- Died: June 21, 1976 (aged 73); Woodland Hills, California, U.S.
- Other name: Margaret Gledhill
- Education: University of Washington
- Occupation: Librarian
- Years active: 1929–1971
- Known for: Academy Librarian (1936–1943); Executive Director, Academy of Motion Picture Arts and Sciences (1945–1971)
- Spouses: Donald Gledhill (m. 1931; div. 1945) Philip A. Herrick (m. 1946; div. 1951)

Margaret Florence Herrick (née Buck, later Gledhill; September 27, 1902 – June 21, 1976) was an American librarian and the executive director of the Academy of Motion Picture Arts and Sciences. In 1971, the academy's library was named the Margaret Herrick Library in her honor.

== Early life ==
She was born Margaret Buck in Spokane, Washington, to Nathan K. Buck, an attorney, and Adda M. Buck (née Morie).

In 1929, Herrick graduated from the University of Washington with a degree in library science.

== Career ==
In 1929, Herrick became head librarian at the Yakima Public Library in Yakima, Washington. She moved to Hollywood, California, with her husband and became the academy's first librarian. She served in that capacity until 1943, during the war, when she became the interim executive director of the academy, replacing her husband. In 1945, she was offered the executive director position permanently and held that position until her retirement in January 1971.

In the mid-1960s, Herrick went on international tours to promote the tenth anniversary of the Oscar for Best Foreign Language Film. Between 1963 and 1968, she visited many international film institutions.

The Academy's extensive library in Beverly Hills, California, of material on films is named in her honor.

=== Oscar moniker ===
Herrick is generally credited with naming the Academy Award an "Oscar", declaring the statuettes "looked just like my Uncle Oscar". However, others, including Academy President Bette Davis and Hollywood gossip columnist Sidney Skolsky, have claimed they invented the name.

Bette Davis said that the statue reminded her of her husband Harmon Nelson's derrière. Nelson's middle name was Oscar. However, Davis later relinquished this claim.

Columnist Sidney Skolsky, who had a syndicated column for over 50 years, referred to the nickname, "Oscar," in his March 17, 1934, column, which is believed to be the first time the award was called the Oscar in print.

== Personal life ==
In 1931, Herrick married Donald Gledhill, an assistant to the executive secretary of the academy. She and Gledhill divorced in 1945. She married Philip A. Herrick in 1946, and continued to use his name professionally following their divorce in 1951.

On June 21, 1976, Herrick died at the Motion Picture & Television Country House and Hospital in Woodland Hills, California, after a lengthy illness.

== Works and publications ==
- Gledhill, Margaret Buck; Christeson, Frances Mary (1941). Classification Scheme for Motion Picture Collections. Hollywood, Calif: Academy of Motion Picture Arts and Sciences Library. hdl:2027/uc1.b3926458. OCLC 613712320.
- Academy of Motion Picture Arts and Sciences; University of California, Los Angeles; Gledhill, Margaret (1944). A Series of Papers on University Training for Motion Picture Work. A Project of the Academy of Motion Picture Arts and Sciences in Collaboration with the University of California at Los Angeles. Hollywood, Calif: Academy of Motion Picture Arts and Sciences, University of California, Los Angeles. OCLC 7851448. "University training for motion picture work; assembled by Margaret Gledhill"
