= Schwab's Pharmacy =

Drugstore in Hollywood, California, 1932–1983

Coordinates: 34.098°N 118.365°W

- Type: Private
- Industry: Pharmacy
- Founded: 1932
- Founders: Bernard Schwab; Leon Schwab; Jack Schwab; Martin Schwab; Lena Schwab; Yetta Schwab
- Defunct: 1983
- Headquarters: 8024 Sunset Boulevard; Hollywood, California, U.S.

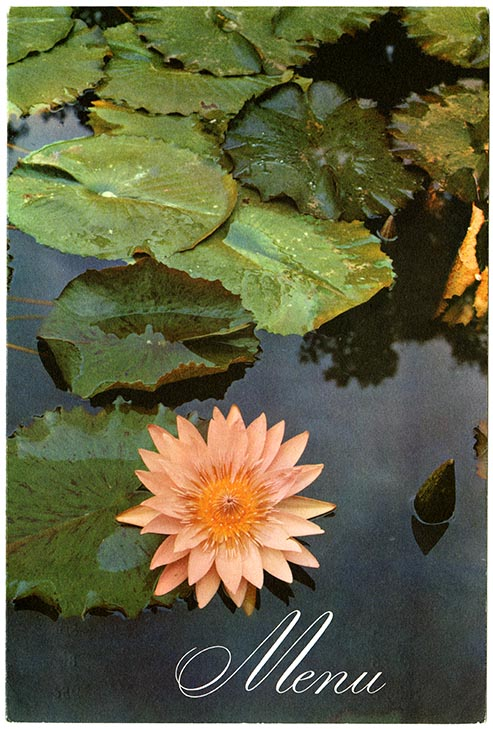
Schwab's menu from 1955

Schwab's Pharmacy was a drugstore located at 8024 Sunset Boulevard in Hollywood, California, and was a popular hangout for movie actors and movie industry dealmakers from the 1930s through the 1950s.

== History ==
Opened in 1932 by the Schwab brothers, Schwab's Pharmacy in Hollywood became the most famous and longest-operating outlet of their small retail chain. Like many drug stores in the United States during the mid-twentieth century, Schwab's sold medicines and had a counter serving ice cream dishes and light meals. In the 1930s, Schwab's was the inspiration for songwriter Harold Arlen to write the music for the song "Over the Rainbow" for the 1939 film The Wizard of Oz.

Schwab's closed in October 1983. Five years later, on October 6, 1988, the building was demolished to make way for a shopping complex and multiplex theater.

Sidney Skolsky, a syndicated Hollywood gossip columnist for the New York Daily News who was the first journalist to use the nickname "Oscar" for the Academy Award in print, made Schwab's famous in the 1930s. He used the drugstore as his office and called his column in Photoplay, the premier movie magazine in the United States at the time, "From a Stool at Schwab's."

A persistent Hollywood legend has it that actress Lana Turner was "discovered" by director Mervyn LeRoy while at the soda counter at Schwab's. While the 16-year-old Turner was discovered at a soda counter, the location was not Schwab's but another establishment, the Top Hat Café, farther east on Sunset Boulevard at McCadden Place, directly across the street from Hollywood High School, where she was still a student. The person who discovered her was not LeRoy, but Hollywood Reporter publisher William Wilkerson.

Today, there is a replica of the establishment at Universal Studios in Florida and Japan, the latter themed around Super Mario.

== In popular media ==
Schwab's was recreated at Paramount studios as a set for the 1950 film Sunset Boulevard.

Schwab's Pharmacy appears in the Netflix limited series, Hollywood. Jack Castello's wife, Henrietta, is shown to work at the store, alongside coworker Erwin Kaye.

Dead Man's Curve by Jan and Dean references Schwab's. The song describes a race down Sunset Boulevard, with the drugstore being one of the landmarks the characters race past.

Invitation to the Blues by Tom Waits also references Schwab's in its lyrics.
