= Diane Baker =

American actress (born 1938)

- Baker in 2023
- Born: February 25, 1938 (age 88); Los Angeles, California, U.S.
- Occupations: Actress; producer
- Years active: 1959–2013
- Known for: The Diary of Anne Frank; Journey to the Center of the Earth; The Prize; Marnie; Mirage; The Silence of the Lambs

Diane Baker (born February 25, 1938) is an American actress, producer, and educator.

== Early life ==
Baker was born February 25, 1938 at Hollywood Presbyterian Hospital and raised in the Los Angeles neighborhoods of North Hollywood and Studio City. She is the daughter of businessman Clyde Lucius Baker and Dorothy Helen Harrington, who Diane claims was "always used" to sit on the knee of one of the Marx Brothers in some of their early films but "hated it" and "quit as soon as she married". Baker has two younger sisters, Patricia and Cheryl.

== Career ==
After securing a seven-year contract with 20th Century Fox in 1958, Baker made her film debut when she was chosen by director George Stevens to play Margot Frank in the 1959 motion picture The Diary of Anne Frank. In the same year, she starred in Journey to the Center of the Earth with James Mason and Pat Boone; and in The Best of Everything with Hope Lange and Joan Crawford.

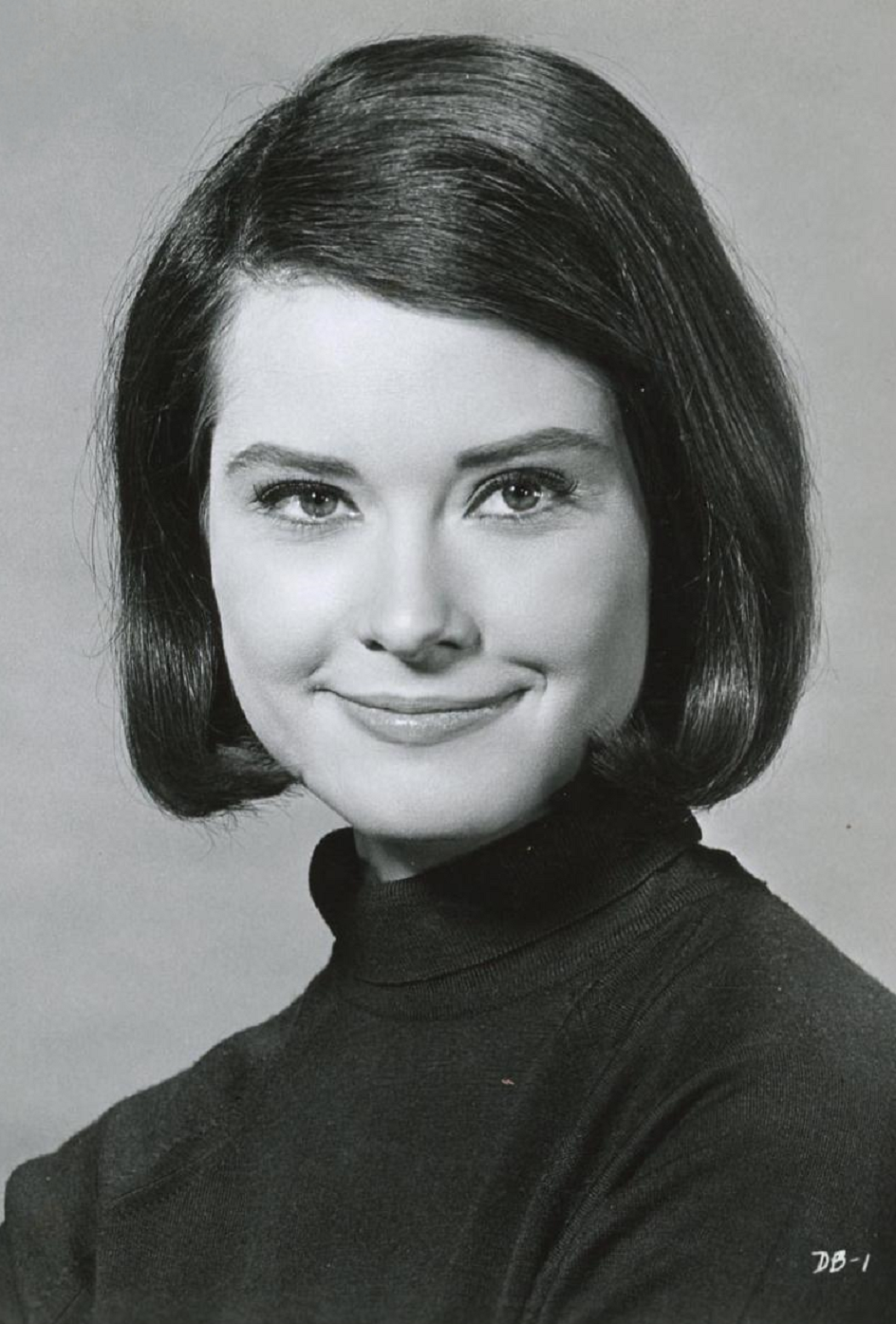
Publicity photo for Marnie (1964)

Other Fox films in which Baker appeared include the assassination thriller Nine Hours to Rama, Hemingway's Adventures of a Young Man, and The 300 Spartans. Her television work, which began in the 1960s, includes appearances on Follow the Sun, Bus Stop, Adventures in Paradise, The Lloyd Bridges Show, The Nurses, The Invaders (in the first episode), and two episodes of Route 66.

Finally out of her contract with Fox after starring in the fourth screen version of Grace Miller White's novel Tess of the Storm Country and The 300 Spartans (1962), Baker appeared in Stolen Hours, a 1963 remake of Dark Victory (Mirisch Corp. and United Artists), and, the same year, opposite Paul Newman and Elke Sommer in The Prize (MGM). From 1963 to 1966, Baker had a recurring role on the medical drama Dr. Kildare.

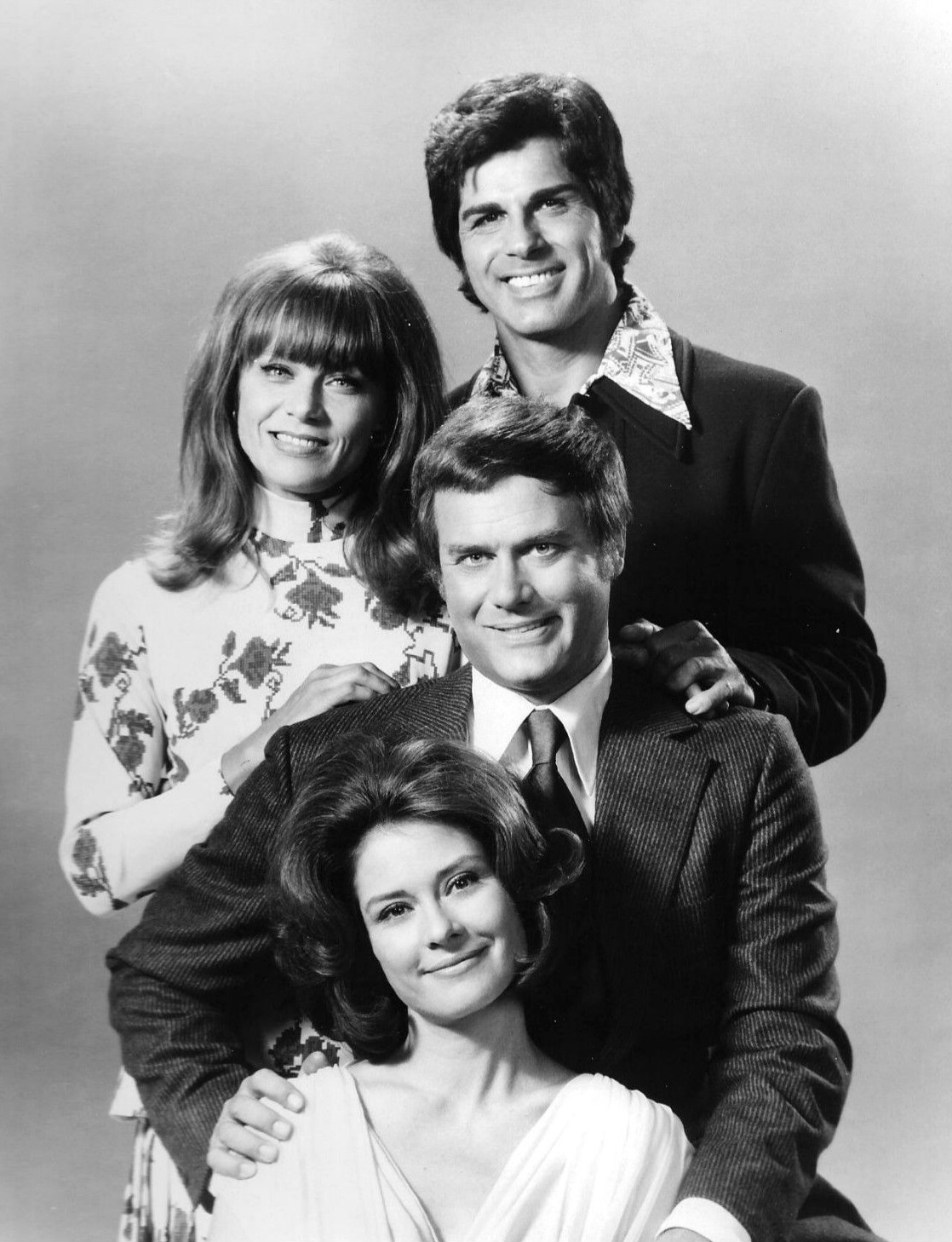
Cast of TV's Here We Go Again, from top: Dick Gautier, Nita Talbot, Larry Hagman and Diane Baker (1973)

In 1964, she co-starred with Joan Crawford in both Strait-Jacket, William Castle's thriller about an axe murderess, and an unsold television pilot Royal Bay, released to theaters as Della. Alfred Hitchcock cast her in his film Marnie (1964) as Lil Mainwaring, the sister-in-law of Mark Rutland (Sean Connery). She co-starred with Gregory Peck and Walter Matthau in the thriller Mirage (1965), directed by Edward Dmytryk, and in Krakatoa, East of Java (1969) with Maximilian Schell. In the TV movie Western The Dangerous Days of Kiowa Jones (1966), she played the role of a woman who falls in love with a drifter (Robert Horton) who is deputized by a dying marshal to take two killers (one of whom is played by Sal Mineo) to a distant jail.

In August 1967, Baker played David Janssen's love interest in the two-part finale of The Fugitive, which became the most-watched show in the history of episodic television up until that time. In 1968, she co-starred with Dean Jones in the Disney film The Horse in the Gray Flannel Suit. In January 1970, she had the lead guest-starring female role as Princess Francesca in the only three-episode mission of Mission: Impossible. In 1973, Baker co-starred in ABC sitcom Here We Go Again. The series was canceled after one season. In 1976, she played the frequently drunken daughter of the title character of the Columbo episode "Last Salute to the Commodore".

In the decades after Mirage, she appeared frequently on television and began producing films, including the drama film Never Never Land (1980) and the miniseries A Woman of Substance (1985), in which she played Laura. She reemerged on the big screen in The Silence of the Lambs (1991) as Senator Ruth Martin. Baker also appeared in the films The Joy Luck Club, The Cable Guy, The Net and A Mighty Wind. She guest-starred in four episodes of House in 2005, 2008, and twice in 2012 as Blythe House, the mother of the title character.

Baker spent more than a decade teaching acting at the Academy of Art University in San Francisco. She was formerly the executive director of the School of Motion Pictures-Television and the School of Acting.

== Personal life ==
Baker has dated Warren Beatty, Gardner McKay, Frank Langella, Michael Lerner and John Saxon.

== Selected TV and filmography ==
Year	Title	Role	Notes
1959	The Diary of Anne Frank	Margot Frank	
1959	Journey to the Center of the Earth	Jenny Lindenbrook	
1959	The Best of Everything	April Morrison	
1960	The Wizard of Baghdad	Princess Yasmin	
1960	Tess of the Storm Country	Tess MacLean	
1962	Hemingway's Adventures of a Young Man	Carolyn	
1962	The 300 Spartans	Ellas	
1963	Nine Hours to Rama	Sheila	
1963	The Prize	Emily Stratman	
1963	Stolen Hours	Ellen	
1964	Strait-Jacket	Carol Harbin	
1964	Marnie	Lil Mainwaring	
1965	Mirage	Shela	
1966	Sands of Beersheba	Susan	Alternative title: Thunder Over Israel
1968	The Horse in the Gray Flannel Suit	Suzie "S.J." Clemens	
1969	Krakatoa, East of Java	Laura Travis	
1976	Baker's Hawk	Jenny Baker	
1980	The Pilot	Pat Simpson	
1990	The Closer	Beatrice Grant	
1991	The Silence of the Lambs	Senator Ruth Martin	
1993	Twenty Bucks	Ruth Adams	
1993	The Joy Luck Club	Mrs. Jordan	
1994	Imaginary Crimes	Abigail Tate	
1996	Courage Under Fire	Louise Boylar	
1997	Murder at 1600	Kitty Neil	
2001	Harrison's Flowers	Mary Francis	
2002	On the Roof	Mrs. Arnott	
2003	A Mighty Wind	Supreme Folk Defense Lawyer	Credited last but no face-time
2005	The Keeper: The Legend of Omar Khayyam	Miss Taylor	Alternative title: Empire Rising
2008	Harrison Montgomery	Mrs. Cutsworth	
2012	Hemingway & Gellhorn	Mrs. Gellhorn	

== Television ==
Year	Title	Role	Notes
1959	Playhouse 90	Shelia Cass	Episode: "In Lonely Expectation"
1960	The DuPont Show of the Month	Nurse Leora Tozer	Episode: "Arrowsmith"
1961	Follow the Sun	Helen Henderson	Episode: "Journey Into Darkness"
1961	Adventures in Paradise	Veronica Sanders	Episode: "Vendetta"
1963	The Doctors and the Nurses	Marjorie Ford	Episode: "Field of Battle"
1963	Mr. Novak	Mrs. Chase	Episode: "A Feeling for Friday"
1963	Route 66	Elisa/Marie Duplessis	2 episodes
1964	Della	Jenny Chappell	Television film
1964	Wagon Train	Alice Whitetree	Episode: "The Alice Whitetree Story"
1964	The Ghost of Sierra de Cobre	Vivia Mandour	Television film
1965	Inherit the Wind	Rachel Brown	Television film
1965	The Big Valley	Hester	Episode: "By Fires Unseen"
1966-1970	The Virginian	Various	3 episodes
1966	Hawk	Mary Wheelis	Episode: "The Longleat Chronicles"
1966	The F.B.I.	Elyse Colton	Episode: "The Camel's Nose"
1966	The Dangerous Days of Kiowa Jones	Amilia Rathmore	Television film
1967	The Fugitive	Jean Carlisle	Episodes: "The Judgment" (Parts 1 & 2)
1967	The Invaders	Kathy Adams	Episode: "Beachhead"
1967	Bob Hope Presents the Chrysler Theatre	Laney	Episode: "Free of Charge"
1967, 1971	Bonanza	Mary Wharton / Norma O'Casey	2 episodes
1969	Trial Run	Carole Trenet	Television film
1969	The Name of the Game	Elaine Brennan	Episode: "Give Till It Hurts"
1969	The D.A.: Murder One	Mary Brokaw	Television film
1970	Mission: Impossible	Francesca	Episodes: "The Falcon" (Parts 1, 2, & 3)
1970	The Interns	Sheila Carmichael	Episode: "The Quality of Mercy"
1970	The Old Man Who Cried Wolf	Peggy Pulska	Television film
1971	Sarge	Carol Swanson	Episode: "The Badge or the Cross"
1971	Congratulations, It's a Boy!	Edye	Television film
1971	A Little Game	Elaine Hamilton	Television film
1971	Night Gallery	Lynn Allcott	Segment: "They're Tearing Down Tim Riley's Bar"
1972	Killer by Night	Tracey Morrow	Television film
1972	Love, American Style	Wendy	Segment: "Love and the Small Wedding"
1973	Love Story	Angie Burnett	Episode: "The Youngest Lovers"
1973	Here We Go Again	Susan Evans	13 episodes
1974	A Tree Grows in Brooklyn	Katie Nolan	Television film
1974	Medical Center	Three-Cornered Cage	Episode: "Three-Cornered Cage"
1974	The ABC Afternoon Playbreak	Diana	Episode: "Can I Save My Children?"
1975	Lucas Tanner	Jessica Atkins	Episode: "Why Not a Happy Ending?"
1975	Marcus Welby, M.D.	Sister Anne	Episode: "The Medea Factor"
1975	The Streets of San Francisco	Inspector Irene Martin	Episode: "The Cat's Paw"
1975	The Dream Makers	Mary Stone	Television film
1976	Police Woman	Cynthia Lambert	Episode: "The Pawn Shop"
1976	Columbo	Joanna Clay	Episode: "Last Salute to the Commodore"
1977	Barnaby Jones	Pat Halston	Episode: "The Wife Beater"
1977	Kojak	Irene Van Patten	2 episodes
1978	The Love Boat	Ruth Newman	Episode: "Pacific Princess Overtures..."
1978	ABC Afterschool Special	Carrie Wilson	Episode: "One of a Kind"
1980	Fugitive Family	Ellen 'Ellie' Roberts	Television film
1981	Trapper John, M.D.	Mrs. Forsyte	Episode: "The Albatross"
1982	The Blue and the Gray	Evelyn Hale	Miniseries
1983	Fantasy Island	Fran Woods	Episode: "Saturday's Child..."
1985	A Woman of Substance	Laura O'Neill	Miniseries
1987	CBS Schoolbreak Special	Helen Welker-Summers	Episode: "Little Miss Perfect"
1990, 1992	Murder, She Wrote	Eleanor Thane/Anna Louisa Barlow/Mary Forsythe	3 episodes
1991	The Haunted	Lorraine Warren	Television film
1992	Mann & Machine	Delores Peterson	Episode: "Water, Water, Everywhere"
1992	Perry Mason: The Case of the Heartbroken Bride	Laura Parris	Television film
1995	A Walton Wedding	Charlotte Gilchrist	Television film
1996	Chicago Hope	Mrs. Kovacs	Episode: "Rise from the Dead"
1998	About Sarah	Lila Hollingsworth	Television film
1998	The Nanny	Roberta	Episode: "Sara's Parents"
2000	ER	Louise Duffy	Episode: "The Domino Heart"
2000	Jackie Bouvier Kennedy Onassis	Rose Kennedy	Television film
2001	Law & Order: Special Victims Unit	Margo Nelson	Episode: "Inheritance"
2002	First Monday	Arlene Braken	3 episodes
2003	Dragnet	Rebecca Barton	Episode: "The Brass Ring"
2005	Unscripted	Diane	5 episodes
2005, 2008, 2012	House	Blythe House	4 episodes
2010	Lie to Me	Judge Quinn	Episode: "The Whole Truth"
2013	The Surrogate	Louise	Television film

== Awards and nominations ==
=== Golden Globe Awards ===
Year	Category	Nominated work	Result
1960	Most Promising Newcomer – Female	The Diary of Anne Frank	Nominated
1964	Best Supporting Actress – Motion Picture	The Prize	Nominated

=== Primetime Emmy Award ===
Year	Category	Nominated work	Result
1966	Outstanding Supporting Actress in a Drama Series	Inherit the Wind	Nominated
1985	Outstanding Limited Series	A Woman of Substance	Nominated

=== Daytime Emmy Award ===
Year	Category	Nominated work	Result
1975	Outstanding Actress in a Daytime Drama Special	The ABC Afternoon Playbreak: "Can I Save My Children?"	Nominated
