= Erskine Johnson =

American journalist

Erskine Johnson (December 14, 1910 – June 14, 1984) was a Hollywood gossip columnist who worked for the Hearst newspaper chain and appeared on the radio and in motion pictures.

== Career ==
His column "Hollywood Notes" was syndicated by the Newspaper Enterprise Association.

Johnson was the source of Groucho Marx's famous quote, “I don’t want to belong to any club that would accept me as one of its members.” Johnson published the remark in his column of 20 October 1949, claiming it came from Marx's resignation letter to the Friars Club. In the late 1940s and early 1950s, Johnson hosted a TV series about Hollywood called Erskine Johnson's Hollywood Reel which aired on Paramount Television Network's flagship station KTLA. It was syndicated to other markets, including Washington, D. C., and Buffalo. On November 14, 1949, Johnson began a program on WOR radio three afternoons per week.

Between 1937 and 1960, Johnson appeared in eight movies and two TV series, mostly as himself or as a reporter. His most memorable screen appearance was in the 1947 comedic mystery The Corpse Came C.O.D. in which he had a cameo as himself with many of his rival gossip columnists.
