= Alfred Sweeney =

American art director

- Born: December 18, 1914; Maine, United States
- Died: December 13, 1984 (aged 69); Santa Barbara, California, United States
- Other names: Alfred Sweeney Jr. Al Sweeney
- Occupation: Art director
- Years active: 1952-1981 (film)

Alfred Sweeney (/swiːniː/; December 18, 1914 - December 13, 1984) was an American art director. He worked on set design on around sixty films during his career. These included the 1959 biblical epic Solomon and Sheba. He spent the earlier stages of his career employed by Universal Pictures, but later freelanced between different studios.

== Selected filmography ==
- The Black Castle (1952)
- The Great Sioux Uprising (1953)
- Destry (1954)
- The Square Jungle (1955)
- The Unguarded Moment (1956)
- The Kettles in the Ozarks (1956)
- Gun for a Coward (1956)
- Star in the Dust (1956)
- The Tarnished Angels (1957)
- A Time to Love and a Time to Die (1958)
- Day of the Badman (1958)
- Solomon and Sheba (1959)
- The Last Sunset (1961)
- Tammy Tell Me True (1961)
- Captain Newman, M.D. (1963)
- Shenandoah (1965)
- Love Has Many Faces (1965)
- Harper (1966)
- Moment to Moment (1966)
- The Appaloosa (1966)
- The War Wagon (1967)
- The Devil's Brigade (1968)
- Bandolero! (1968)
- The Bridge at Remagen (1969)
- Rabbit, Run (1970)
- Fools' Parade (1971)
- Cisco Pike (1972)
- The Carey Treatment (1972)
- The Train Robbers (1973)
- Oklahoma Crude (1973)
- Uptown Saturday Night (1974)
- Silver Streak (1976)
- A Piece of the Action (1977)
- North Dallas Forty (1979)

== Bibliography ==
- Smith, Gary Allen. Epic Films: Casts, Credits and Commentary on More Than 350 Historical Spectacle Movies. McFarland, 2015.
