= Judy of Rogue's Harbor =

1920 film by William Desmond Taylor

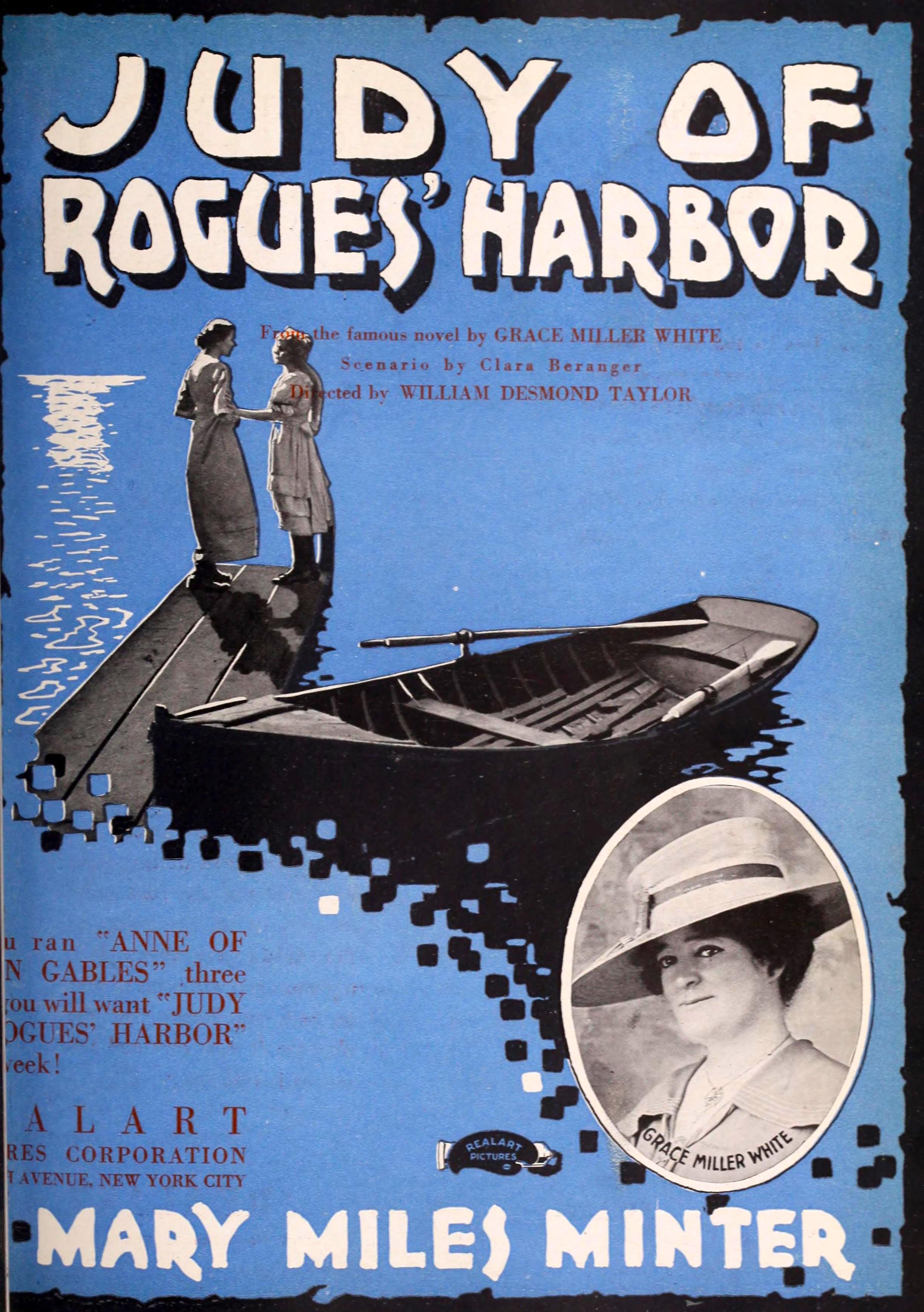
- Advertisement for film
- Directed by: William Desmond Taylor
- Written by: Clara Beranger (scenario)
- Based on: Judy of Rogue's Harbor by Grace Miller White
- Starring: Mary Miles Minter
- Cinematography: James Van Trees
- Production company: Realart Pictures Corporation
- Distributed by: Realart Pictures Corporation
- Release date: February 14, 1920 (United States)
- Running time: 6 reels
- Country: United States
- Language: Silent (English intertitles)

Judy of Rogue's Harbor is a 1920 American silent drama film directed by William Desmond Taylor and starring Mary Miles Minter. The film is based on the novel of the same name by Grace Miller White, with a scenario by Clara Beranger. It was produced by Famous Players–Lasky and distributed through Realart and Paramount Pictures.

== Plot ==
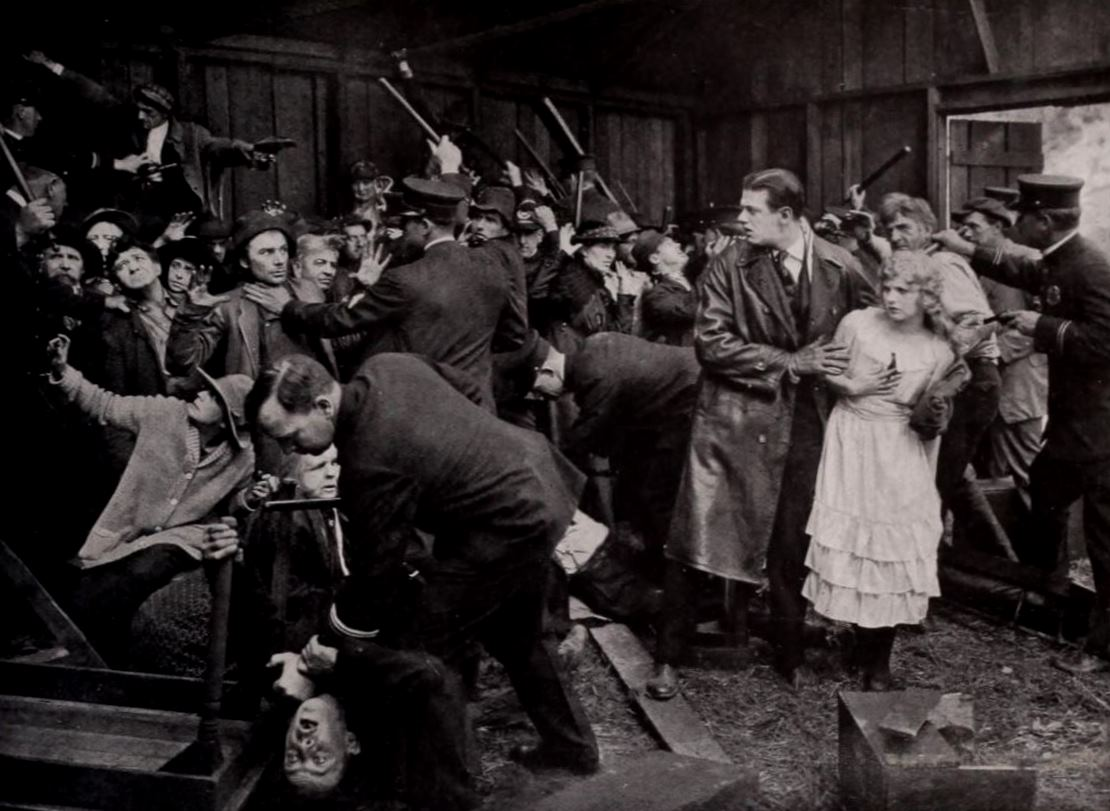
A scene from "Judy of Rogue's Harbor" (1920)

As described in various film magazine reviews, Judy, is a young girl living in poverty in Rogue's Harbor with her "Grandpap" Ketchel, Olive and Denny, whom she believes to be her sister and cousin respectively. "Grandpap" is consistently cruel, to Denny especially, and he is aided in this cruelty by Jim Schuckles, who hopes to wed Judy. Judy's confidante is the mysterious "Lady of the Roses", to whom she eventually brings Denny to keep him safe from "Grandpap" and Jim.

Meanwhile, Governor Kingsland comes to visit the area, along with his grandson Teddy, who falls in love with Judy. Through Olive, who is now pregnant with Jim Shuckles' child, Judy finds out that Jim is plotting to throw a bomb at Governor Kingsland. She saves the Governor's life, and brings him to the house of the Lady of the Roses to keep him safe.

Here it transpires that Judy is in fact the daughter of the Governor's deceased friend, and the heiress to a fortune; not only that, but the Lady of the Roses is her mother. The Governor had lied in an attempt to keep Judy's fortune to himself, telling the Lady of the Roses that the child was dead and placing her with "Grandpap" Ketchel. Judy is happily reunited with her real family and, once she has arranged the marriage of Jim and Olive, she is free to wed Teddy Kingsland.

The April–May 1920 edition of "Motion Picture Classic" features a detailed fiction adaptation of the film, complete with several stills from the picture. The March 27th, 1920 edition of Motion Picture News lists a musical cue sheet for the film.

== Cast ==
- Mary Miles Minter as Judy
- Charles Meredith as Lt. Teddy Kingsland
- Herbert Standing as Governor Kingsland
- Theodore Roberts as Grandpap Ketchel
- Clo King as Lady of the Roses
- Fritzi Ridgeway as Olive Ketchel
- Allan Sears as Jim Shuckles
- Frankie Lee as Denny
- George Periolat as Peter Kingsland

== Preservation ==
With no prints of Judy of Rogue's Harbor located in any film archives, it is considered a lost film.
