= -30- (film) =

1959 film by Jack Webb

- Film poster
- Directed by: Jack Webb
- Written by: William Bowers
- Produced by: Jack Webb
- Starring: Jack Webb; William Conrad; Whitney Blake
- Cinematography: Edward Colman
- Edited by: Robert M. Leeds
- Music by: Ray Heindorf
- Production company: Mark VII Limited
- Distributed by: Warner Bros. Pictures
- Release date: November 11, 1959 (New York City)
- Running time: 88 minutes
- Country: United States
- Language: English

-30- (released as Deadline Midnight in the UK) is a 1959 film directed by Jack Webb and starring Webb and William Conrad as night managing editor and night city editor, respectively, of a fictional Los Angeles newspaper, loosely based on the real-life (and now defunct) Los Angeles Herald-Examiner.

The title is a reference to -30-, a notation used in journalism to indicate the end of a story or article.

== Plot ==
Managing editor Sam Gatlin and his staff assemble the early edition of the Examiner, a morning newspaper in Los Angeles. During a particularly active news night, Gatlin and his wife Peggy disagree about adopting a child, as Peggy is infertile. Gatlin is hesitant to adopt because his young son from his first marriage had been killed several years before by a drunk driver.

Longtime reporter Lady Wilson's grandson pilots a military bomber from Honolulu to New York, intending to set a speed record. A child is lost and feared drowned in the L.A. sewers during a torrential rainstorm, and Gatlin composes a provocative headline for the news story. Copy boy Earl Collins considers quitting after failing to place a $1 bet for city editor Jim Bathgate about how many babies a pregnant Italian actress will birth. Bathgate would have won $50, so he demands an IOU from Collins but then tears it into pieces, smiling to himself on his way out of the newsroom.

== Cast ==
- Jack Webb as Sam Gatlin
- William Conrad as Jim Bathgate
- David Nelson as Earl Collins
- Louise Lorimer as Lady Wilson
- Nancy Valentine as Jan Price
- Whitney Blake as Peggy Gatlin
- James Bell as Ben Quinn
- Joe Flynn as Hy Shapiro
- Richard Bakalyan as Carl Thompson
- Dick Whittinghill as Fred Kendall
- John Nolan as Ron Danton
- Richard Deacon as Chapman
- Howard Culver as Walt Ashton
- Fay McKenzie as Mrs. Jason
- Ronnie Dapo as Billy
- William Tracy as Unnamed Writer
- Phil Gordon as unnamed character
- Mark Scott as unnamed character
- Olan Soule as Vince
- Dick Cathcart as unnamed character
- Marshall Kent as Mr. Jason
- Alan Reynolds as Newspaper Employee
- Donna Sue Needham as Lucille Greghauser
- John Truax as Newspaper Employee

== Reception ==
In a contemporary review for The New York Times, critic Howard Thompson wrote: "[T]he picture sorely lacks the pounding, graphic drive of Mr. Webb's previous directional efforts. Even worse, about 80 per cent of the dialogue is a wearying exchange of stale wise-cracking—the kind of sophomoric newspaper lingo that went out with prohibition. It is Mr. Webb who outcracks everyone. And somehow, with all the crass yammering, a paper actually emerges, headlining a child's rescue from a sewer. ... Mr. Webb has used for his title the traditional newsman's sign-off symbol. But his picture, crammed with so much smart-alec nonsense, is rarely as authentic."

== See also ==
- List of American films of 1959
