= A Time to Love and a Time to Die =

1958 film

- Film poster
- Directed by: Douglas Sirk
- Written by: Orin Jannings; Erich Maria Remarque (uncredited)
- Based on: novel by Erich Maria Remarque
- Produced by: Robert Arthur
- Starring: John Gavin; Liselotte Pulver
- Cinematography: Russell Metty
- Edited by: Ted J. Kent
- Music by: Miklós Rózsa
- Production company: Universal Pictures
- Distributed by: Universal Pictures
- Release dates: July 5, 1958 (Berlin); July 9, 1958
- Running time: 132 minutes
- Countries: United States; West Germany
- Language: English
- Box office: $1.6 million (US/Canada) rentals 2.8 million admissions (France)

A Time to Love and a Time to Die is a 1958 Eastmancolor CinemaScope drama war film directed by Douglas Sirk and starring John Gavin and Liselotte Pulver. Based on the book by German author Erich Maria Remarque and set on the Eastern Front and in Nazi Germany, it tells the story of a young German soldier who is revolted by the conduct of the German army in the Soviet Union and actions of the Nazi Party on the homefront.

According to Variety magazine, the film "was regarded by the company's exec echelon, at the outset, as fine drama and [a] wham money-maker but the box office disappointment is now ascribed to [an] absence of names".

== Plot ==
As a German infantry unit retreats across Russia in the spring of 1944, Ernst Graeber's conscience is revolted by the execution of captured civilians. Given his first furlough for over two years, he returns to find his family home bombed and his parents gone. Calling at the house of the family doctor for information, the daughter Elizabeth tells him her father is in a concentration camp because of an unwise remark. Allied bombing continues by day and by night.

Oscar Binding, old school friend who is now the local head of the Nazi Party, offers Ernst accommodation, food, drink, and women, but Ernst prefers to stay with fellow soldiers billeted in a hospital and to get closer to Elizabeth. With the help of another soldier, Ernst takes Elizabeth to a restaurant secretly open despite the wartime ban on luxuries. That night, the restaurant is destroyed during a bombing.

Each alone in the world, they agree to an immediate marriage, but Elizabeth's family home is flattened by bombs and they take refuge in a ruined church. Elizabeth gets a summon to Gestapo headquarters, which Ernst intercepts and attends as her husband. He is given her father's ashes, which he secretly buries in the churchyard, though he later confesses to Elizabeth of her father's death. Ernst visits Professor Pohlmann, his former teacher, and meets Joseph, a Jew on the run whom Pohlmann is hiding. Pohlmann tells Ernst that there is no excuse for the Wehrmacht's war crimes against Russians and of the German state against its own citizens. Later, Pohlmann is arrested after distracting the police to help Joseph escape. Ernst requests an extended leave from the army to stay with Elizabeth, but his request is denied. On their last night together, the city is bombed again. At Elizabeth's request, they spend the night together in their lodgings instead of taking refuge in a bomb shelter.

Returning to the front, Ernst finds a fellow soldier who is an ardent Nazi about to shoot captured civilians. As the two are alone, he kills the other soldier and tells the civilians to flee. One of them picks up the dead man's rifle and shoots Ernst dead. He had not finished reading a letter from Elizabeth, saying that she was expecting their child.

== Cast ==
- John Gavin as Ernst Graeber
- Liselotte Pulver as Elizabeth Kruse, later Graeber
- Jock Mahoney as Immerman
- Don DeFore as Hermann Boettcher
- Keenan Wynn as Reuter
- Erich Maria Remarque as Professor Pohlmann
- Dieter Borsche as Captain Rahe
- Barbara Rütting as Woman Guerrilla
- Thayer David as Oscar Binding
- Charles Régnier as Joseph
- Dorothea Wieck as Frau Lieser
- Kurt Meisel as Heini
- Agnes Windeck as Frau Witte
- Clancy Cooper as Sauer
- John van Dreelen as Political Officer
- Klaus Kinski as Gestapo Lieutenant
- Alice Treff as Frau Langer
- Alexander Engel as Mad Air Raid Warden
- Jim Hutton as Hirschland (as Dana J. Hutton)
- Bengt Lindström as Steinbrenner

== Production ==
Remarque met Sirk in 1954 and the director persuaded the writer to adapt his own novel for the screen. ("I found him an extraordinarily understanding and capable man", said Remarque. "He knew what he wanted to do with my book.") Sirk's son, actor Klaus Detlef Sierck (1925–1944), died in Ukraine as a soldier of the Panzer-Grenadier-Division Großdeutschland when he was 18 years old.

Universal decided to cast two relative unknowns in the lead. As studio executive Al Daff said:

We could have put two well-known personalities in it and proceeded on the basis of making a star vehicle. Or we could, as we decided to do, cast the story for inevitability and put into the lead roles talented, fresh performers who would not have to overcome the handicap of personality identification and could be accepted as a young Nazi officer and his sweetheart.

At one stage Ann Harding was going to play a role.

Filming took place in West Berlin, which Sirk had fled over 20 years before and the US Army Europe training area at Grafenwöhr. Interiors were shot at CCC Film's Spandau Studios in Berlin. The film's sets were designed by the art directors Alexander Golitzen and Alfred Sweeney. Gavin was accompanied by his new wife, treating the production as their honeymoon.

The movie was the screen debut of Jim Hutton, who was serving in the American army in Berlin at the time.

The musical score was composed by Miklós Rózsa on loanout from M-G-M, where he had been the primary composer for over a decade. It is unknown why Universal sought this unusual loanout. Frank Skinner, the studio's lead composer, had scored most of Douglas Sirk's previous picutures.

Universal sent a screen test of Gavin to critics in advance of the film's release. Hedda Hopper saw a preview and predicted that Gavin will "take the public by storm and so will the picture, which should also put its co-star, Lilo Pulver in the top ten."

Universal publicly claimed that the film cost $5 million but Universal president Milton Rackmil denied that they had ever spent that amount on a film.

== Reception ==
The Los Angeles Times wrote the film wasn't as good as All Quiet on the Western Front but was "vivid, sometimes brutally shocking and, less often, emotionally moving."

The film is recognized by American Film Institute in these lists:

- 2002: AFI's 100 Years...100 Passions – Nominated

=== Box office ===
The film was expected to be Universal's biggest film of the year and was, with theatrical rentals of $1.6 million in the United States and Canada. The film was one of the most popular of the year in France. Kinematograph Weekly listed it as being "in the money" at the British box office in 1958.

== Awards ==
Nominated

- Academy Award: Best Sound Recording (Leslie I. Carey) (1959)
- Berlin Film Festival: Golden Bear (1958)
