= Della (film) =

- Written by: Richard Alan Simmons
- Directed by: Robert Gist
- Starring: Joan Crawford; Paul Burke; Charles Bickford; Diane Baker
- Music by: Fred Steiner
- Country of origin: United States
- Original language: English

Production
- Producers: Stanley M. Kallis; Joan Crawford (uncredited)
- Cinematography: Wilfrid M. Cline
- Editor: Bernard Burton
- Running time: 70 minutes
- Production company: Four Star Television

Original release
- Network: NBC
- Release: August 8, 1964

Della is a 1964 American made-for-television drama film starring Joan Crawford, Paul Burke, Charles Bickford and Diane Baker. Directed by Robert Gist, the film was originally produced by Four Star Television as a television pilot for a proposed NBC series named Royal Bay which was to star Burke as a lawyer and Bickford as his cantankerous, righteous father.

Following the successful film-to-television progressions of movie stars such as Lucille Ball and Barbara Stanwyck, Crawford attempted the same maneuver with Royal Bay, a soap opera in a fictional seaside town where she was the wealthy matriarch and daughter of the town's founder. However, the pilot centered on the two characters that would most likely not reprise their role for the series, mother and daughter Della and Jenny Chappell. This may have been one of the reasons the pilot was released as a standalone film instead of the start of a series.

== Plot ==
Della Chappell (Joan Crawford) is a reclusive wealthy woman, consumed by power and dedicated to protecting the future of her daughter Jenny (Diane Baker). Her father founded the town of Royal Bay and she still owns most of it. An outside company wants to buy parts of the town for development but Della refuses to consider the option. Barney Stafford (Paul Burke), a lawyer representing the developers' interests, butts heads with Della frequently.

She invites him to her home for a meeting at 2:00 AM. Barney, eager to settle the matter, heads over to Della's estate and instead he meets Jenny. Barney notices strange happenings at the house, such as everyone sleeping during the day and all business is conducted in the middle of the night. He comes to learn that Jenny has a skin condition that prevents her from being in the light and keeps her inside the home at all times. At a particularly tense meeting, Della attempts to employ Barney in a veiled attempt to buy his company for Jenny.

After a discussion with his father, Barney goes to apologize to Della. After all is revealed (why Jenny must never leave) Barney leaves, presumably for good. Angry and upset, Jenny then leaves the house and ultimately crashes her car because she is disoriented and is killed.

== Cast ==
- Joan Crawford as Della Chappell
- Paul Burke as Barney Stafford
- Charles Bickford as Hugh Stafford
- Diane Baker as Jenny Chappell
- Richard Carlson as David Stafford
- Robert Sampson as Joel Stafford
- Otto Kruger as Walter Garrick
- James Noah as Chris Stafford
- Marianna Case as Addie Stafford
- Sara Taft as Mrs. Kyle
- Walter Woolf King as Sam Jordon
- Barney Phillips as Eric Kline
- Voltaire Perkins as Herb Foster
- Richard Bull as Mark Nodella
- Jan Shepard as Secretary

== Notes ==
Joan Crawford and Diane Baker played mother and daughter for the second time in only a few months, following the horror classic, Strait-Jacket earlier that year.

== Home video releases ==
Following years of obscurity, the film was finally released on videocassette under the title Fatal Confinement by a company called International Film Forum in 1988.

On January 31, 2012, Della was released as an exclusive manufacture-on-demand DVD-R through the TCM Shop.
