= Ted Casablanca =

Gossip columnist

- Born: Bruce Wallace Bibby; November 20, 1960 (age 65); Dallas, Texas, U.S.
- Occupations: Gallery owner, gossip columnist, journalist

Ted Casablanca (born Bruce Wallace Bibby; November 20, 1960) is an American entertainment journalist and gossip columnist. He had an E! Online column called The Awful Truth, which ran for sixteen years, ending in July 2012.

== Biography ==
=== Career ===
Casablanca’s early career included roles at Esquire and Rolling Stone, where he worked in research and editorial positions. These roles shaped the writing of "The Awful Truth". This column not only attracted a loyal readership but also paved the way for future celebrity bloggers and gossip websites. Casablanca began writing for Première magazine in 1987, where he originally conceived his gossip column "The Awful Truth" before transferring it to E! in 1996 as a weekly (later daily) column. He regularly presented it on E! Television and sometimes appeared as a correspondent and commentator for various E! Television events. Casablanca earned notoriety for delving into the personal lives and relationships of celebrities in "The Awful Truth"; Casablanca often attributed pseudonyms to the subjects of his pieces, and garnered attention with his satirical speculation on the secret sexuality of particular celebrities. As Bruce Bibby, he has written for a number of entertainment magazines and has been a contributor to the television magazine Hard Copy. Casablanca was also the gallery owner of Ted Casablanca Gallery in Palm Springs, California.

=== Television and film appearances ===
Casablanca appeared on several television series, usually as a commentator, but he has also appeared as himself on Grosse Pointe and, more recently, in an episode of General Hospital in February 2007. In October 2023 during an interview, Casablanca discussed his decision to step away from the public eye and celebrity journalism, reflecting on the increasing commercialisation and sensationalism in the industry.

=== Personal life ===
Casablanca was born Bruce Wallace Bibby on November 20, 1960, in Dallas County, Texas, to Robert and Alice Wallace Bibby. Casablanca earned a degree in sculpture from the California Institute of the Arts before turning to journalism.

According to his own column, Casablanca married Jon Powell in Hawaii in May 2008. But on September 16, 2009, Casablanca announced that he and Powell had, after a separation, decided to end their union. Casablanca was also notably paired with actor Harvey Fierstein from 1987 to 1992.
