= Tess of the Storm Country (1960 film) =

1960 film by Paul Guilfoyle

- Theatrical release poster
- Directed by: Paul Guilfoyle
- Screenplay by: Charles Lang; Rupert Hughes
- Based on: Tess of the Storm Country by Grace Miller White
- Produced by: Everett Chambers
- Starring: Diane Baker; Jack Ging; Lee Philips; Archie Duncan; Nancy Valentine; Bert Remsen
- Cinematography: James Wong Howe
- Music by: Paul Sawtell; Bert Shefter
- Production company: Associated Producers Inc
- Distributed by: 20th Century-Fox
- Release date: December 8, 1960
- Running time: 84 minutes
- Country: United States
- Language: English

Tess of the Storm Country is a 1960 American drama film directed by Paul Guilfoyle, written by Charles Lang and starring Diane Baker, Jack Ging, Lee Philips, Archie Duncan, Nancy Valentine and Bert Remsen. It is based on the novel with the same title by Grace Miller White and its adaptation for the stage by Rupert Hughes. The film was released on December 8, 1960, by 20th Century-Fox.

== Plot ==
The movie starts in a rural town in Pennsylvania, where a feud simmers between farmer Fred Thorson and the Graveses. The latter are a Mennonite family who sold their mill to the Foley chemical company that is now contaminating the river with toxic wastes. Tess MacLean, accompanied by her uncle Capt. Hamish MacLean, arrives from Scotland to marry John Faulkner.

Tess arrives in Pennsylvania and is told that her fiancé is dead. Peter Graves, a resident of the town, tells Tess that his family did not kill Faulkner; however, Eric Thorson, a member of the rival family and a close friend of John, tells her that Peter's dad killed John. Tess also learns that John has left his farm to her. However, due to the poisoned water the farm starts dying. When one of the newborn calves dies from poisoning on Tess's farm, she lashes out at Peter, telling him to close down the mill. Realizing that they can drive the mill out of business with a dam, Eric's father Fred petitions the Graveses to build a dam, but they refuse because only the government can petition a dam.

The Graveses invite the MacLeans to dinner, where Tess comments on the strange Mennonite customs. However, dinner comes to an end when Fred arrives and says his prize Angus steer has fallen ill and vows vengeance if the animal dies. Eric goes to ask Foley to shut down the mill and when refused gets drunk. While drunk, he kisses Tess, who retaliates because he is being too forward. A day after this, Tess rides her bike to the river that crosses the Graveses’ land. When a bull attacks her, Peter saves her. Tess kisses him and admits she respects him.

After Fred's bull dies, he and Captain McLean plot to blow up the plant. Tess arrives at the plant just after Fred plants the bomb, and it explodes. The guards thinks that Tess blew up the plant, but Peter accepts responsibility. After Peter is arrested, Tess visits him in prison and kisses him. Then Eric, Captain MacLean, and Foley arrive. Foley lies and says the exploded due to a faulty steam boiler, freeing Peter. Peter asks MacLean for Tess's hand in marriage. He consents but refuses to attend the wedding when he learns it will be held in a Mennonite church and Tess will like a life of a Mennonite wife. As Tess and Peter repeat their vows, MacLean and Fred peer through the church window. When the newlyweds go outside, MacLean gives his blessing.

== Cast ==
- Diane Baker as Tess MacLean
- Jack Ging as Peter Graves
- Lee Philips as Eric Thorson
- Archie Duncan as Hamish MacLean
- Nancy Valentine as Teola Graves
- Bert Remsen as Mike Foley
- Wallace Ford as Fred Thorson
- Grandon Rhodes as Mr. Foley
- Robert F. Simon as Mr. Graves

== Production ==
The film was produced by Robert L. Lippert's outfit Associated Producers Inc.

In August 1960, Millie Perkins was suspended by 20th Century-Fox for refusing to play the lead, and Diane Baker took the role.
