= The Black Castle =

1952 film by Nathan H. Juran

- Original film poster
- Directed by: Nathan H. Juran
- Screenplay by: Jerry Sackheim
- Story by: Jerry Sackheim
- Produced by: William Alland
- Starring: Richard Greene; Boris Karloff; Stephen McNally; Rita Corday; Lon Chaney Jr.
- Cinematography: Irving Glassberg
- Edited by: Russel F. Schoengarth
- Color process: Black and white
- Production company: Universal Pictures
- Distributed by: Universal Pictures
- Release dates: October 31, 1952 (Los Angeles); December 25, 1952 (New York)
- Running time: 82 minutes
- Country: United States
- Language: English

The Black Castle is a 1952 American historical gothic horror film directed by Nathan H. Juran, produced by William Alland and starring Richard Greene, Boris Karloff, Stephen McNally, Rita Corday and Lon Chaney Jr.

== Plot ==
British gentleman Sir Ronald Burton investigates the disappearance of his two friends at the Austrian estate of the sinister Count von Bruno, who secretly seeks revenge against the leaders of a British force who set the natives against him in colonial Africa. Burton's missing friends are among Bruno's victims, and Burton is now also in the trap. Burton plans to escape with Bruno's abused countess, but the count's henchmen bar the way.

== Cast ==
- Richard Greene as Sir Ronald Burton, alias Richard Beckett
- Boris Karloff as Dr. Meissen
- Stephen McNally as Count Carl von Bruno
- Rita Corday as Countess Elga von Bruno (as Paula Corday)
- Lon Chaney Jr. as Gargon
- John Hoyt as Count Steiken
- Michael Pate as Count Ernst von Melcher
- Nancy Valentine as Therese von Wilk
- Tudor Owen as Romley
- Henry Corden as Fender
- Otto Waldis as Krantz the Innkeeper
- Leslie Denison as Sir David Layton

== Production ==
The film was scheduled to be directed by Joseph Pevney, with Nathan Juran as the art director, but Pevney became unhappy with the script. When Universal-International Pictures refused to adopt the changes that he wanted, Pevney withdrew and Juran was named director two weeks before filming commenced. The film was shot over the course of 20 days. Its sets were designed by the art directors Bernard Herzbrun and Alfred Sweeney.

Juran later said that he had been greatly helped by the cast, particularly Karloff, and Juran's assistant director William Holland. Universal was impressed with Juran's work and offered him a one-year contract as a director.

== Release ==
Universal-International Pictures released The Black Castle as a special prerelease Halloween night showing in Los Angeles on October 31, 1952. The film was afforded a general release the following week, but only in cities and towns with populations under 50,000 before reaching larger cities later in 1953.

== Reception ==
In a contemporary review, Harrison's Reports declared the film "a good program horror melodrama, the kind that gives one the chills" and noted: "The three principals do good work, and so does Boris Karloff".

The Hollywood Reporter wrote that the film "stacks up as excellent program fare".

Time commented that the film "tries hard to chill the moviegoer's spine. Most of the time, however, this boy-meets-ghoul melodrama is only tepid theatrics."

== Home media ==
The film, along with Night Key, Tower of London, The Climax and The Strange Door, was released on DVD in 2006 by Universal Studios as part of The Boris Karloff Collection. In 2020, Scream Factory included the film in its four-film set Universal Horror Collection: Volume 6.
