= George Fisher (journalist) =

George Fisher (18 December 1909 – 9 December 1987) was a Hollywood gossip columnist and radio personality who worked for the Los Angeles Evening News and radio stations KCMJ, KFI, KFWB and KNX in his career. He also had columns in the movie magazines Modern Screen and Radio Mirror. He started his career in the newspaper business as a 15-year-old copy boy at the San Francisco Examiner, becoming a radio reporter broadcasting stories from the Examiner for radio station KYA. Both the newspaper and the radio station were owned by William Randolph Hearst. He continued as a radio broadcaster for 33 years.

Beginning March 17, 1958 he had his own eponymous quarter-hour daily talk show at 5:30 pm on KHJ-TV. He has a star memorializing his radio career on the Hollywood Walk of Fame.
