= Margaret Herrick Library =

Library in Beverly Hills, California

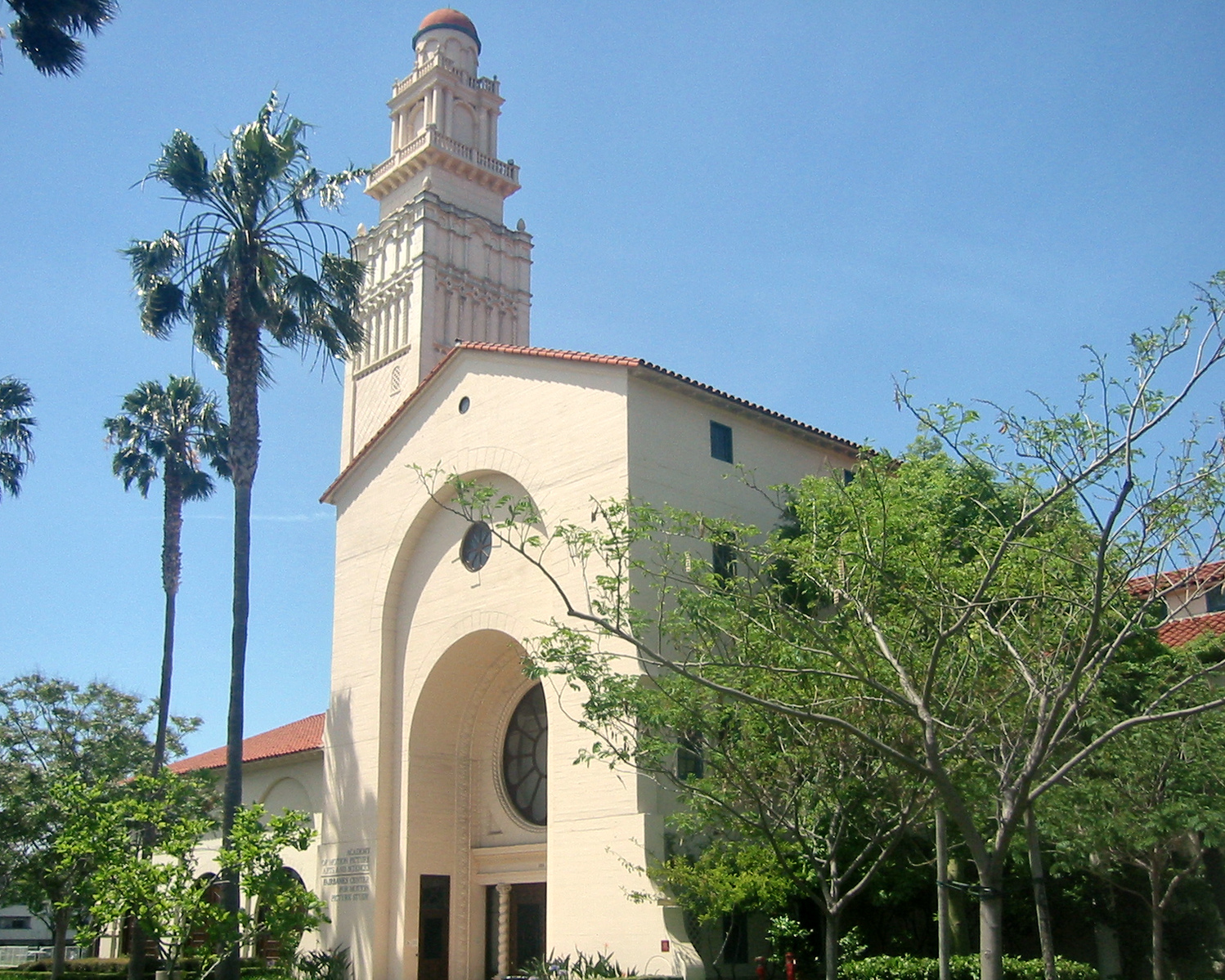
- Fairbanks Center for Motion Picture Study, where the library is housed
- 34.0605°N 118.3767°W
- Location: 333 S. La Cienega Boulevard; Beverly Hills, California, U.S., United States
- Type: Research library
- Established: 1928

Collection
- Items collected: Books, screenplays, periodicals, photographs, production records, correspondence letters, drawings, and advertising materials

Access and use
- Access requirements: Core Collection Reading Room – no appointment required; Special Collections Reading Room – appointment required
- Circulation: On-site use only
- Population served: Students, film historians, and industry professionals

Other information
- Budget: $24.6 million (2024)
- Director: Matt Severson
- Employees: 70 (2021)
- Website: oscars.org/library

The Margaret Herrick Library (also known as the Academy Library) is the main repository of print, graphic and research materials of the Academy of Motion Picture Arts and Sciences (AMPAS). It is located in Beverly Hills, California. The library is governed by the Academy Foundation Board.

== Collection ==
The Margaret Herrick Library is one of the primary homes of AMPAS's Academy Collection, the world’s largest film-related collection. It contains more than 52 million items – photographs, films, posters, animation cels, screenplays, costumes, props, etc. - and spans from cinema’s pre-history to the present, including movie production records, correspondence and other materials pertaining to film studios, production companies, individuals, and professional organizations. The library holds books, screenplays, and files of clippings, posters, photographs, copies of periodicals, costume and production and costume sketches, sheet music and musical scores, and advertising materials, including press books and lobby cards. The Academy Collection site includes a portion of the Academy Collection that is searchable for the public and can be seen on-site, either by walk-in or by an appointment.

== History ==
The original research library (named the Academy Library) was established in 1928, a year after the founding of AMPAS.

In 1936, Margaret Herrick began serving as the head librarian, holding her position until 1943. Dedicated to AMPAS' mission of broadening the film industry's educational and cultural outreach, Herrick was responsible for establishing the library as a world-class research institution. In 1947, Herrick was responsible for the first acquisition of an archival collection: the William Selig collection. In 1952, Herrick negotiated to have the Academy Awards televise their broadcast, which allowed for the awards ceremony and the library to become financially independent from the major Hollywood studios. She was promoted to executive director in 1945, which she served until her retirement in 1971. At her retirement ceremony, the institution was renamed the Margaret Herrick Library.

Since its inception, the Academy library had offices in the Roosevelt Hotel. In 1975, after occupying rented space across the city, the Academy moved its office spaces and its library to a seven-story building in the Beverly Hills business district. However, the library's collection began to outgrow its storage place. A year later, the city of Beverly Hills abandoned its namesake Waterworks building in favor of obtaining its water supply from the Los Angeles Metropolitan Water District.

By 1987, the building had suffered structural damage and was vandalized with graffiti. The building was targeted for demolition by the City Council, but was spared when a Superior Court judge ordered the city to prepare an environmental impact report. Meanwhile, members of the Academy toured the derelict building, and considered it as a potential new site of the library.

In 1988, the Academy and the city of Beverly Hills signed a 55-year lease agreement to renovate the building into a new location for the library, on a rehabilitation budget of $6 million. Frances Offenhauser, an architect, led the restoration project. The open-spaced interior was left almost intact while the vandalism on the building's exterior was removed. In January 1991, the library reopened at its current location, the Fairbanks Center for Motion Picture Study.. The nearby La Cienega Metro station will serve the area once open on May 8, 2026.

== See also ==
- Margaret Herrick
- Academy of Motion Picture Arts and Sciences
