= Jimmie Fidler =

American columnist (1898–1988)

- Fidler in a scene from Personality Parade (1938)
- Born: August 26, 1898; St. Louis, Missouri, US
- Died: August 9, 1988 (aged 89)
- Occupations: columnist journalist radio and television personality
- Honours: Hollywood Walk of Fame

Jimmie Fidler (August 26, 1898 – August 9, 1988) was an American columnist, journalist and radio and television personality. He wrote a Hollywood gossip column and was sometimes billed as Jimmy Fidler.

Born James Marion Fidler in St. Louis, Missouri, Fidler was a Hollywood publicist and advertising man who became a highly successful syndicated columnist with his "Jimmie Fidler in Hollywood" column in 187 outlets, including the New York Post and the Los Angeles Times. In 1933–34, his 15-minute NBC radio show, Hollywood on the Air, sponsored by Tangee lipstick, was broadcast from the Hollywood Roosevelt Hotel. He was regarded in Hollywood as a genuine threat to gossip queen Louella Parsons, especially after he scooped her in November 1935 on a major story about Clark Gable, an incident so embarrassing to Parsons that she lied about it in her autobiography.

== Films ==
Fidler had brief experience in movies before he became a columnist. Winning first prize in a contest in Memphis, Tennessee, took him to Hollywood. Once there, he was an extra before he "worked his way to semi-important roles".

Fidler interviewed film personalities for the Hollywood segments of Fox Movietone News. Such was Fidler's influence that a negative comment by him could affect the box office drawing power of a star. According to Time, in January 1938 he was sued for libel by Constance Bennett for $250,000 (equal to $5,718,085 today) after he reported she snubbed Patsy Kelly on a Hal Roach movie set and that studio workmen bought flowers for Kelly but none for Bennett.

Fidler won the case, with the judge ruling that remarks against a public character, even if false, are not libelous if made without malice.

In 1938, Fidler made a short MGM documentary film, Personality Parade, about actors making the change from silent films to talkies. It featured clips of more than 60 performers whose careers began in silent films.

== Television ==
By 1950, Fidler was earning more than $250,000 a year (equal to $3,345,436 today) and was heard by 40 million listeners over 486 radio stations. During 1952–53, he hosted the live television drama series, Hollywood Opening Night on NBC.

Fidler continued his radio program in independent syndication until his retirement in late 1983, at the age of 85. For his contribution to the radio industry, Fidler has a star on the Hollywood Walk of Fame at 6128 Hollywood Blvd.

== See also ==
- Hedda Hopper
- Louella Parsons
- Walter Winchell
