= Sidney Skolsky =

Actor, gossip columnist, radio personality, screenwriter

- Sidney Skolsky as himself in The Corpse Came C.O.D. (1947)
- Born: May 2, 1905; New York, New York, U.S.
- Died: May 3, 1983 (aged 78); Los Angeles, California, U.S.
- Occupations: Gossip columnist Screenwriter; Movie actor Movie producer Radio personality
- Spouse(s): Estelle Lorenz (1928-1983; his death)
- Children: 2

Sidney Skolsky (May 2, 1905 – May 3, 1983) was an American writer best known as a Hollywood gossip columnist. He ranked with Hedda Hopper (with whom he shared a birthday) and Louella Parsons as the premier Hollywood gossip columnists of the first three decades of the sound picture era.

Skolsky was a radio personality in addition to having his own syndicated newspaper column, he was a screenwriter and movie producer who occasionally acted in radio and films. Skolsky claimed to be the person who gave the nickname "Oscar" to the Academy Award and was credited for the introduction of the use of the word beefcake.

== Biography ==
Skolsky was born to a Jewish family, the son of dry goods store proprietor Louis Skolsky and his wife Mildred in New York City. He studied journalism at New York University before becoming a Broadway press agent for the theatrical impresarios Earl Carroll, Sam Harris, and George White. When he became the New York Daily News gossip columnist in 1928, the 23-year-old Skolsky was the youngest Broadway gossip columnist plying his trade on the Great White Way. He also had a Sunday column, "Tintypes", profiles of actors, directors and other production personnel and Hollywood creative types, that continued in print for 52 years, until a couple years before his death.

He moved to Hollywood in 1933, where he moonlighted as a story editor for Darryl F. Zanuck's Twentieth Century Pictures. The New York Daily Mirror hired him away from the Daily News in 1937, and he moved to the New York Post in 1943. United Features syndicated his column to other newspapers. He also had a regular column titled "Sounds Off" in Photoplay, the country's premiere movie magazine. His Photoplay column was bylined "From a Stool at Schwab’s", the Hollywood drugstore he made famous. He helped promulgate the myth Lana Turner had been discovered there, when it actually had been another Sunset Boulevard establishment, The Top Hat Cafe, which was closer to Lana's alma mater, Hollywood High. He helped champion and was very close to Marilyn Monroe.

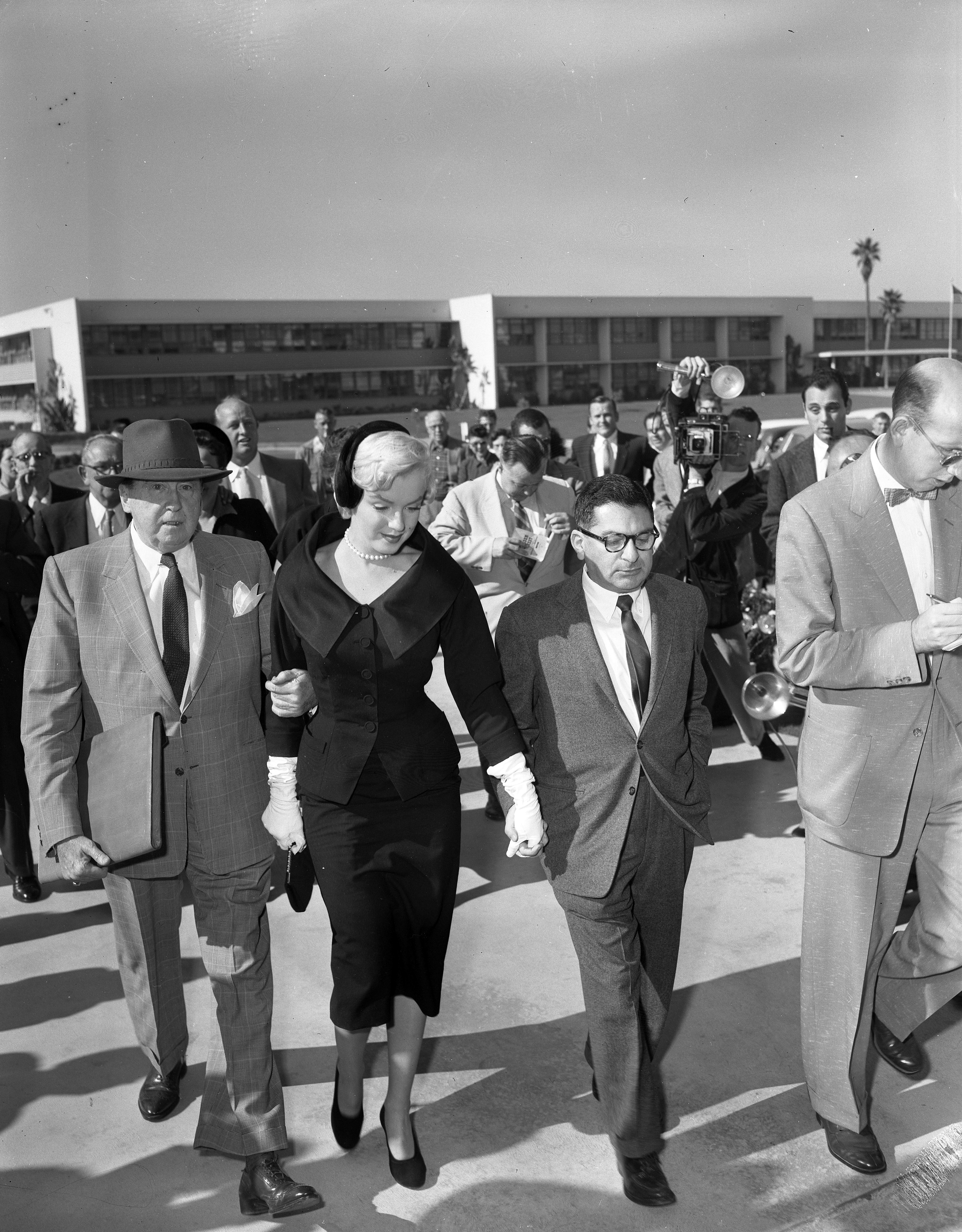
Jerry Giesler, Marilyn Monroe, and Sidney Skolsky

While Skolsky might not have created the nickname "Oscar" for the Academy Award, he is the first person to use the nickname in print for Hollywood's premier award, in his 17 March 1934 column. In 1946, he became a movie producer with The Jolson Story (1946), which was nominated for several Academy Awards. He followed it up with 1953 bio The Eddie Cantor Story. Starting in 1954, KABC-TV Los Angeles featured him in his own TV show, Sidney Skolsky’s Hollywood. He wrote five books about Hollywood and the movies, including a 1975 autobiography, Don’t Get Me Wrong, I Love Hollywood.

Skolsky died in 1983 from complications due to Parkinson's disease and atherosclerosis. He was married for 54 years to the former Estelle Lorenz, with whom he had had two daughters. His writings are part of the permanent collection at the Academy of Motion Picture Arts and Sciences' Margaret Herrick Library.

== Filmography ==
Year	Title	Role	Notes
1932	The Sport Parade	Newsman Sid	Uncredited
1933	Hallelujah, I'm a Bum	Minor Role	Uncredited
1934	Hi Nellie!	Skolsky	Uncredited
1934	Gift of Gab	Movie Magazine Columnist	Uncredited
1941	Tom, Dick and Harry	Photographer	Uncredited
1947	The Corpse Came C.O.D.	Himself	
1950	Sunset Boulevard	Himself	
1958	Teacher's Pet	Himself	
1961	The Right Approach	Newspaper Columnist	Uncredited
1967	Don't Make Waves	Reporter	Uncredited
1968	The Legend of Lylah Clare	Himself	
