= Grace Miller White =

American novelist

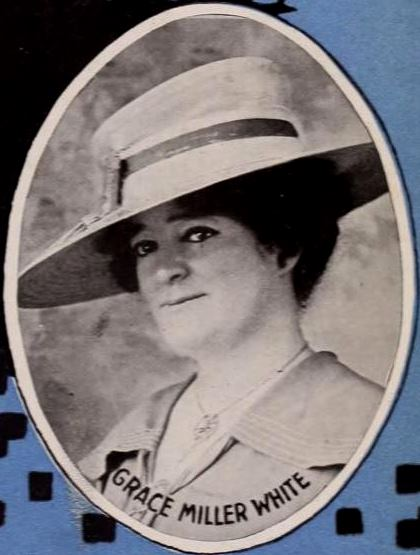
From an advertisement for the film Judy of Rogue's Harbor (1920)

Grace Miller White (1868–1957) was an American writer. She began her writing career novelizing plays, before turning her hand to novels in 1909. Several of her books were adapted for the big screen, most notably Tess of the Storm Country, which was filmed on four occasions between 1914 and 1960. She adopted the name Grace around 1897, in memory of a younger sister who had died before reaching her first birthday.

== Biography ==
Mary Esther Miller was born in 1868, in Ithaca, New York.

As a child, White was lame and walked with crutches, so she could not be sent to school. Although she was later cured, she was married at the age of 15 and never had any regular schooling. By the age of 23, she had given birth to five children. At 23, she became a widow in Butte, Montana, with four children. Although one of her children was blind and died later, she brought up her three other children and eventually sent her oldest child through college. She married twice, first to Homer White, and then to Friend H. Miller.

At some point in her life, White began traveling for a drug firm. She took her sample case through the Midwest, Virginias, and Carolinas, receiving US$100 a month and her expenses. Although she made enough money, White gave up her job as she wanted to find something else that would allow her to be at home with her children. With this idea, White came to New York City in 1899 and received employment in secretarial work with the Paris exposition commission. However, in less than a year, the Paris exposition ended, and White was left without a job. At this time, White had also been studying by attending a private evening school. After two years of night study, she took the regents’ exam which qualified her to enter college. However, she declined to pursue further education.

One day, White went to lunch with a stenographer she knew who was working at a paper called the American Commerce and Industry. The paper was run by George Casey and was published in the interests of the McKinley political campaign. The stenographer was able to introduce her to Mr. Casey, and eventually, after writing a sample letter, White was hired by the publication to write matter that would appeal to the women of the United States promoting the election of McKinley. After some time, White was also hired to make public political speeches supporting McKinley. For several years afterwards, White regularly participated in the republican campaign committee of New York to speak in every campaign both within the city and the surrounding country.

In 1902, she was matron of honor at the wedding of the writer Zoe Anderson Norris and the illustrator J. K. "Jack" Bryans.

Although White first began her writing career novelizing plays, she eventually began working on novels and wrote her first big seller, Tess of the Storm Country in 1909. This book received many favorable reviews and was made into four different film adaptations.

== Selected bibliography ==
- Deserted at the Altar (1905) (made into the film of the same name in 1922)
- The House of Mystery (1905) (novelization of the play of the same name by Langdon McCormick)
- Tess of the Storm Country (1909)
- From the Valley of the Missing (1911)
- When Tragedy Grins (1912)
- Rose o' Paradise (1915)
- The Secret of the Storm Country (1917)
- Judy of Rogues' Harbor (1918) (made into the film of the same name in 1920)
- The Shadows of the Sheltering Pines (1919)
- Storm Country Polly (with Frank Tenney Johnson, 1920) (made into the film of the same name in same year)
- The Marriage of Patricia Pepperday (1922)
- The Ghost of Glen Gorge (1925)
- Susan of the Storm (1927)
