= Jimmy Starr =

American screenwriter

Jimmy Starr (February 3, 1904 – August 13, 1990) was an American screenwriter and columnist.

Starr began his career in Hollywood at 15 as an office boy at MGM. In 1923, Starr was hired as motion-picture editor of the now defunct Los Angeles Evening Post-Record, to which he contributed the “Cinematters” column through 1930. Starr worked as a screenwriter in Hollywood during the 1930s. In the 1940s he worked as a film writer and columnist, providing reviews and insights into the film world, and occasionally appeared in cameo film roles. His novel The Corpse Came C.O.D. was made into a 1947 film.

After retirement from the Hollywood scene, Starr moved to Phoenix, Arizona, where he worked for many years as Director of Advertising and Public Relations for Ramada Inn, then headquartered in Phoenix.

He gave many of his papers and photographs to Arizona State University in the 1970s.
