= Gossip columnist =

Someone who writes a gossip column in a newspaper or magazine

A gossip columnist is someone who writes a gossip column in a newspaper or magazine, especially in a gossip magazine. Gossip columns are written in a light, informal style, and relate opinions about the personal lives or conduct of celebrities from show business (motion picture movie stars, theater, and television actors), politicians, professional sports stars, and other wealthy people or public figures. Some gossip columnists broadcast segments on radio and television.

The columns mix factual material on arrests, divorces, marriages and pregnancies, which are obtained from official records, with more speculative gossip stories, rumors, and innuendo about romantic relationships, affairs, and purported personal problems.

Gossip columnists have a reciprocal relationship with the celebrities whose private lives are splashed about in the gossip column's pages. While gossip columnists sometimes engage in (borderline) defamatory conduct, spreading innuendo about alleged immoral or illegal conduct that can injure celebrities' reputations, they also serve as an important part of the publicity machine that turns actors and musicians into celebrities and superstars that are the objects of the public's obsessive attention and interest. The publicity agents of celebrities often provide or "leak" information or rumors to gossip columnists to publicize the celebrity or their projects, or to counteract "bad press" that has recently surfaced about their conduct.

== Libel and defamation ==
While gossip columnists' "bread and butter" is rumor, innuendo, and allegations of scandalous behavior, there is a fine line between the legally-acceptable spreading of rumors and the making of defamatory statements, the latter of which can provoke a lawsuit. Newspaper and magazine editorial policies normally require gossip columnists to have a source for all of their allegations to protect the publisher from lawsuits for defamation (libel).

In the United States, celebrities or public figures can sue for libel if their private lives are revealed in a gossip column and they believe that their reputation has been defamed – that is, exposed to hatred, contempt, ridicule, or pecuniary loss. Gossip columnists cannot defend against libel claims by arguing that they merely repeated but did not originate the defaming rumor or claim. Instead, a columnist must prove that the allegedly defaming statement was truthful or that it was based on a reasonably reliable source.

In the mid-1960s, rulings by the United States Supreme Court made it harder for the media to be sued for libel in the US. The Court ruled that libel occurs only if a publication prints falsehoods about a celebrity with "reckless disregard" for the truth. A celebrity suing a newspaper for libel must prove that the paper published the falsehood with actual malice or with deliberate knowledge that the statement was both incorrect and defamatory.

Moreover, the Court ruled that only factual misrepresentation, not expression of opinion, is libel. Thus, if gossip columnists write that they "think that Celebrity X is an idiot", the columnist does not face a risk of being sued for libel. On the other hand, if columnists invent an allegation that "Celebrity X is a wife beater" with no supporting source or evidence, the celebrity can sue for libel on the grounds that their reputation was defamed.

In some circumstances, however, gossip columnists do not fact-check the information that they receive from their sources before they publish their stories. Also, some gossip columnists who are not themselves reputable post articles about celebrities. As a result, there is a chance of published stories leading to the defamation of celebrities.

== History ==
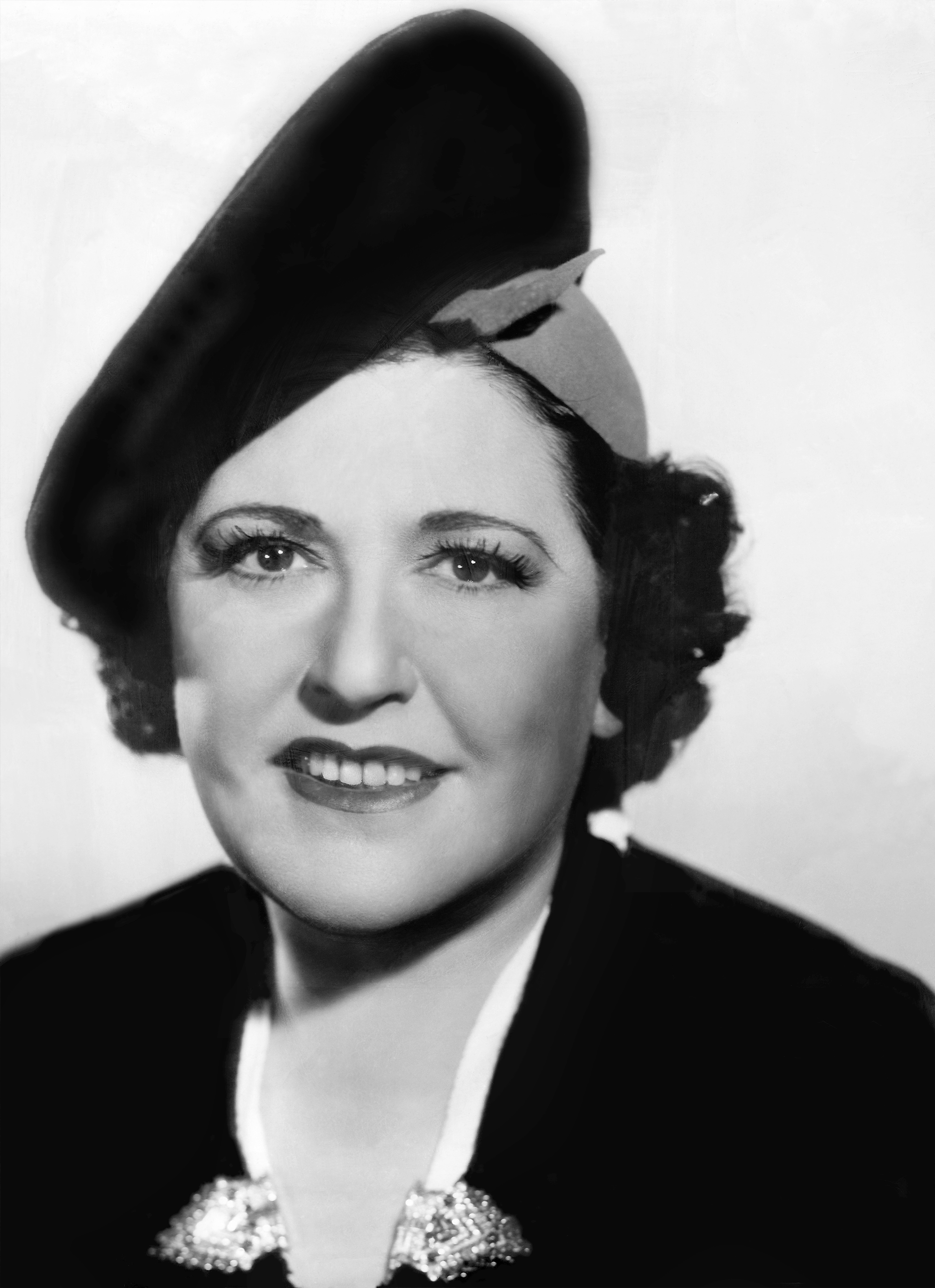
Louella Parsons (1937)

The precursors to gossip columns were the society columns of the 19th and early 20th centuries. James Gordon Bennett Sr. is credited with first creating this position at the New York Herald in 1840.

Walter Winchell, a gossip columnist famous in the 1930s and 1940s, was the first writer to have a syndicated gossip column. Winchell used his political, entertainment, and social connections to mine information and rumors, which he either published in his column On Broadway or traded to accumulate more power. He has been referred to as "the most feared journalist" of his era. From the 1930s to the 1950s, the two best-known Hollywood gossip columnists were the competing Hedda Hopper and Louella Parsons.

In Hollywood's "Golden Age" in the 1930s and 1940s, gossip columnists were courted by the movie studios so that the studios could use gossip columns as a powerful publicity tool. During that period, the major film studios had "stables" of contractually-obligated actors, and controlled nearly all aspects of the lives of their movie stars. Well-timed leaks about a star's purported romantic adventures helped movie studios to create and sustain public interest in their star actors. The studios' publicity agents also acted as unnamed "well-informed inside sources." In this capacity, agents could counteract whispers about celebrity secrets, such as homosexuality or an out-of-wedlock child, which could severely damage both the individual reputation of a movie star and their greater box office viability.

Having fallen into ill-repute after the heyday of Hopper and Parsons, gossip columnists saw a comeback in the 1980s. Many mainstream magazines such as Time, which once considered the hiring of gossip columnists as beneath their stature, now have sections titled "People" or "Entertainment". Such mainstream gossip columns provide a light, chatty glimpse into the private lives and misadventures of the rich and famous.

At the other end of the journalism spectrum, there are entire publications that deal primarily in gossip, rumor, and innuendo about celebrities, such as the British 'red-top' tabloids and the celebrity 'tell-all' magazines.

== Notable gossip columnists ==
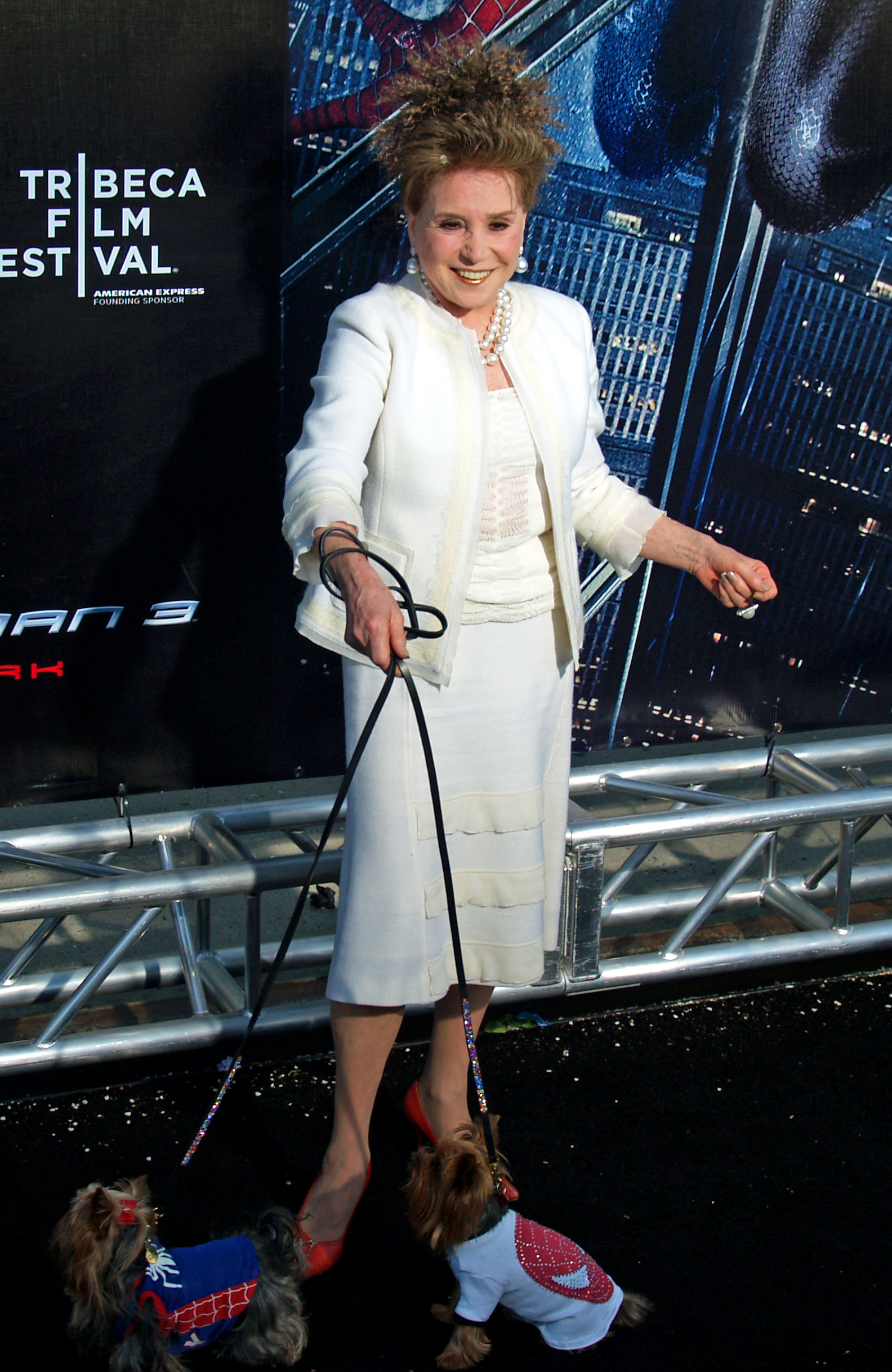
Cindy Adams (April 2007)

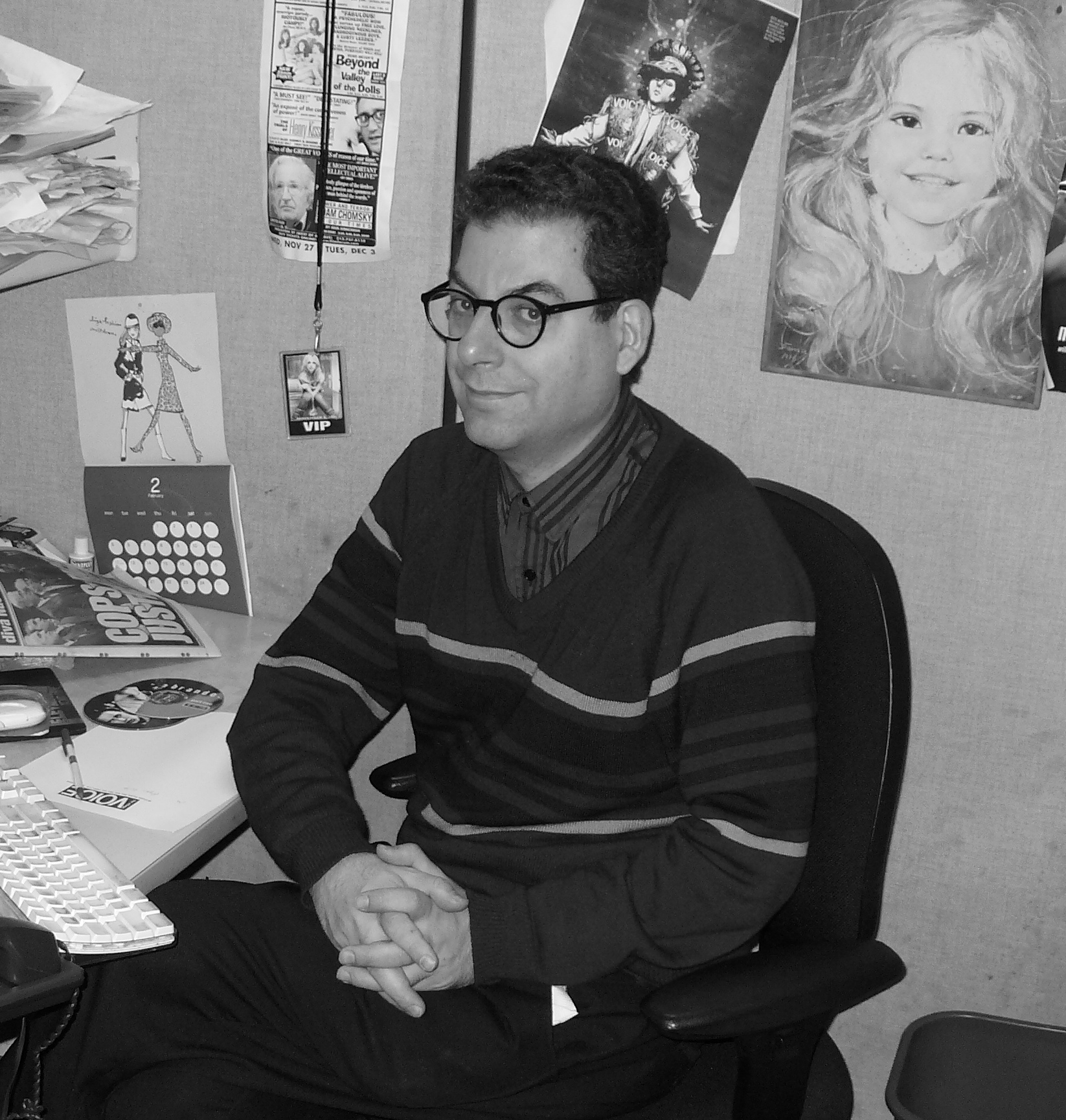
Michael Musto (March 2007)

Notable gossip columnists include:

- Cindy Adams
- Jani Allan
- Flo Anthony
- Army Archerd
- Rona Barrett
- Marilyn Beck
- A.J. Benza
- Jamie Foster Brown
- Ted Casablanca
- Claudia Cohen
- Mike Connolly
- Giles Coren
- Ana Marie Cox
- Nigel Dempster
- Matt Drudge
- Jinx Falkenburg
- Jimmy Fidler
- Luke Ford
- Sheilah Graham
- Charles Graves
- Lloyd Grove
- Ian Halperin
- Tanya Hart
- David Hartnell
- Courtney Hazlett
- Perez Hilton
- Hedda Hopper
- Arianna Huffington
- Micah Jesse
- Dorothy Kilgallen
- Irv Kupcinet
- Frances Lynn
- Isabel Mallon as "Bab" (1880s–90s)
- Elsa Maxwell
- Florabel Muir
- Michael Musto
- Louella Parsons
- Drew Pearson
- Rex Reed
- Michelangelo Signorile
- Sidney Skolsky
- Liz Smith
- Adela Rogers St. Johns
- Jimmy Starr
- Ed Sullivan
- Mike Walker
- Jeannette Walls
- Earl Wilson
- Walter Winchell
- Mila Ximénez

== Columns not named for a columnist ==
Gossip columns that are not named after a specific columnist, along with the media source, include:

- 3am — Daily Mirror, a British newspaper.
- Access Hollywood — a syndicated television program
- Bizarre — The Sun, a London newspaper
- Page Six — New York Post, a New York City newspaper
- Inside New York, in New York Post, New York City newspaper
- Inside the Beltway — The Washington Times, a Washington, D.C. newspaper
- Off the Record — The New York Observer, a New York newspaper
- Vegas Confidential — Las Vegas Review-Journal, a Las Vegas newspaper

== See also ==
- Blind item
- Defamation
- Gossip
- Innuendo
- Roman à clef
